= 2014–15 UD Las Palmas season =

UD Las Palmas
2014–15 season
- Chairman: Miguel Ángel Ramírez
- Manager: Paco Herrera
- Stadium: Estadio Gran Canaria
- Segunda División: 4th (promoted)
- Copa del Rey: Round of 32
- Top goalscorer: League: Sergio Araujo (25); All: Sergio Araujo (25)
Home colours	Away colours

The 2014–15 UD Las Palmas season was UD Las Palmas' ninth season consecutive in second division of the Spanish football league, the Segunda División, and the 65th as a football club. Besides the Segunda División, the club also competed in the 2014–15 Copa del Rey, losing in the round of 32 to La Liga side Celta Vigo.

== Players ==
=== First-team squad ===
Note: Flags indicate national team as defined under FIFA eligibility rules; some limited exceptions apply. Players may hold more than one non-FIFA nationality.

No.	Pos.	Nation	Player
1	GK	ESP	Raúl Lizoain
2	DF	ESP	David Simón
3	DF	ESP	Christian Fernández
4	MF	ESP	Vicente Gómez
5	DF	ESP	David García (captain)
6	DF	ESP	Ángel López
7	MF	ESP	Nauzet Alemán
8	FW	ESP	Alfredo Ortuño (on loan from Granada)
9	MF	ESP	Asdrúbal Hernández
10	FW	ARG	Sergio Araujo
11	MF	ESP	Momo
12	DF	URU	Marcelo Silva
13	GK	ESP	Casto

No.	Pos.	Nation	Player
14	MF	ESP	Hernán
15	MF	ESP	Roque Mesa
16	DF	ESP	Aythami Artiles
17	FW	ESP	Guzmán
18	MF	ESP	Javi Castellano
19	MF	ARG	Emmanuel Culio
20	FW	ESP	Jonathan Viera
21	MF	ESP	Juan Carlos Valerón
22	FW	ESP	Héctor Figueroa
23	DF	ESP	Dani Castellano
24	FW	ESP	Tana
25	DF	ESP	Jesús

=== Youth players ===
Note: Flags indicate national team as defined under FIFA eligibility rules; some limited exceptions apply. Players may hold more than one non-FIFA nationality.

No.	Pos.	Nation	Player
27	MF	ESP	Leo
28	FW	ESP	Artiles
30	GK	ESP	Ale Martín

=== Out on loan ===
Note: Flags indicate national team as defined under FIFA eligibility rules; some limited exceptions apply. Players may hold more than one non-FIFA nationality.

No.	Pos.	Nation	Player
—	DF	ESP	Carlos Gutiérrez (at Leganés)
—	FW	ESP	Benja (at Sabadell)
—	FW	ESP	Tyronne del Pino (at Huesca)

== Competitions ==
=== Overview ===
Competition	First match	Last match	Starting round	Final position	Record							
Competition	First match	Last match	Starting round	Final position	Pld	W	D	L	GF	GA	GD	Win %
Segunda División	23 August 2014	7 June 2015	Matchday 1	4th	42	22	12	8	73	47	+26	52.38
Segunda División promotion play-offs	10 June 2015	21 June 2015	Semi-finals	Winners	4	1	2	1	4	4	+0	25.00
Copa del Rey	10 September 2014	16 December 2014	Second round	Round of 32	4	3	0	1	7	4	+3	75.00
Total					50	26	14	10	84	55	+29	52.00

Source: Soccerway

=== Segunda División ===
==== League table ====
Pos	Team	Pld	W	D	L	GF	GA	GD	Pts	Promotion, qualification or relegation
2	Sporting Gijón (P)	42	21	19	2	57	27	+30	82 (Note: Sporting Gijón finished ahead of Girona on goal difference; Sporting de Gijón +30, Girona +28)	Promotion to La Liga
3	Girona	42	24	10	8	63	35	+28	82	Qualification to promotion play-offs
4	Las Palmas (O, P)	42	22	12	8	73	47	+26	78	Qualification to promotion play-offs
5	Valladolid	42	21	9	12	65	40	+25	72	Qualification to promotion play-offs
6	Zaragoza	42	15	16	11	61	58	+3	61	Qualification to promotion play-offs

Source: LFP - Liga Adelante
Rules for classification: 1) points; 2) head-to-head points; 3) head-to-head goal difference; 4) goal difference; 5) number of goals scored
(O) Play-off winners; (P) Promoted

==== Results summary ====
Overall								Home						Away					
Pld	W	D	L	GF	GA	GD	Pts	W	D	L	GF	GA	GD	W	D	L	GF	GA	GD
42	22	12	8	73	47	+26	78	15	4	2	44	21	+23	7	8	6	29	26	+3

==== Results by round ====
Round	1	2	3	4	5	6	7	8	9	10	11	12	13	14	15	16	17	18	19	20	21	22	23	24	25	26	27	28	29	30	31	32	33	34	35	36	37	38	39	40	41	42
Ground	H	A	H	A	H	A	H	A	H	A	H	A	H	A	A	H	A	H	A	H	A	A	H	A	H	A	H	A	H	A	H	A	H	A	H	H	A	H	A	H	A	H
Result	W	D	W	W	W	L	D	D	W	D	W	W	D	W	D	W	W	L	W	W	D	D	W	L	W	D	D	D	L	L	W	L	W	L	D	W	L	W	W	W	W	W
Position	2	5	2	1	1	1	1	4	2	4	3	1	1	1	1	1	1	1	1	1	1	1	1	1	1	1	1	1	4	4	3	4	2	4	4	4	5	4	4	4	4	4

A = Away; H = Home; W = Win; D = Draw; L = Loss

==== Matches ====
23 August 2014 1	Las Palmas	2–0	Llagostera	Las Palmas
21:00 CEST (UTC+2)

31 August 2014 2	Mallorca	1–1	Las Palmas	Palma
21:00 CEST (UTC+2)

7 September 2014 3	Las Palmas	3–0	Lugo	Las Palmas
21:00 CEST (UTC+2)

13 September 2014 4	Racing Santander	1–2	Las Palmas	Santander
20:00 CEST (UTC+2)

20 September 2014 5	Las Palmas	4–1	Alcorcón	Las Palmas
20:00 CEST (UTC+2)

28 September 2014 6	Tenerife	2–1	Las Palmas	Santa Cruz de Tenerife
12:00 CEST (UTC+2)

4 October 2014 7	Las Palmas	1–1	Sporting Gijón	Las Palmas
20:00 CEST (UTC+2)

12 October 2014 8	Real Betis	0–0	Las Palmas	Seville
12:00 CEST (UTC+2)

19 October 2014 9	Las Palmas	2–0	Numancia	Las Palmas
19:00 CEST (UTC+2)

25 October 2014 10	Ponferradina	2–2	Las Palmas	Ponferrada
20:00 CEST (UTC+2)

1 November 2014 11	Las Palmas	2–1	Albacete	Las Palmas
20:00 CET (UTC+1)

8 November 2014 12	Girona	1–2	Las Palmas	Girona
20:00 CET (UTC+1)

15 November 2014 13	Las Palmas	0–0	Mirandés	Las Palmas
18:30 CET (UTC+1)

23 November 2014 14	Valladolid	1–2	Las Palmas	Valladolid
12:00 CET (UTC+1)

6 December 2014 16	Las Palmas	1–0	Leganés	Las Palmas
20:00 CET (UTC+1)

10 December 2014 15	Sabadell	2–2	Las Palmas	Sabadell
20:00 CET (UTC+1)

13 December 2014 17	Recreativo	2–4	Las Palmas	Huelva
20:00 CET (UTC+1)

21 December 2014 18	Las Palmas	1–2	Osasuna	Las Palmas
19:00 CET (UTC+1)

3 January 2015 19	Barcelona B	0–2	Las Palmas	Barcelona
20:00 CET (UTC+1)				Stadium: Mini Estadi

11 January 2015 20	Las Palmas	5–3	Zaragoza	Las Palmas
12:00 CET (UTC+1)

17 January 2015 21	Alavés	1–1	Las Palmas	Vitoria-Gasteiz
20:00 CET (UTC+1)

25 January 2015 22	Llagostera	0–0	Las Palmas	Llagostera
19:00 CET (UTC+1)

31 January 2015 23	Las Palmas	2–1	Mallorca	Las Palmas
21:00 CET (UTC+1)

8 February 2015 24	Lugo	2–1	Las Palmas	Lugo
12:00 CET (UTC+1)

15 February 2015 25	Las Palmas	1–0	Racing Santander	Las Palmas
19:00 CET (UTC+1)

21 February 2015 26	Alcorcón	0–0	Las Palmas	Alcorcón
19:00 CET (UTC+1)

1 March 2015 27	Las Palmas	1–1	Tenerife	Las Palmas
13:00 CET (UTC+1)

8 March 2015 28	Sporting Gijón	1–1	Las Palmas	Gijón
19:00 CET (UTC+1)

15 March 2015 29	Las Palmas	0–3	Real Betis	Las Palmas
12:00 CET (UTC+1)

21 March 2015 30	Numancia	4–2	Las Palmas	Soria
20:00 CET (UTC+1)

28 March 2015 31	Las Palmas	4–2	Ponferradina	Las Palmas
CET (UTC+1)

4 April 2015 32	Albacete	1–0	Las Palmas	Albacete
CET (UTC+1)

12 April 2015 33	Las Palmas	2–0	Girona	Las Palmas
CET (UTC+1)

18 April 2015 34	Mirandés	2–1	Las Palmas	Miranda de Ebro
CET (UTC+1)

26 April 2015 35	Las Palmas	1–1	Valladolid	Las Palmas
CET (UTC+1)

2 May 2015 36	Las Palmas	2–0	Sabadell	Las Palmas
CET (UTC+1)

9 May 2015 37	Leganés	2–1	Las Palmas	Leganés
CET (UTC+1)

16 May 2015 38	Las Palmas	3–0	Recreativo	Las Palmas
CET (UTC+1)

19 May 2015 39	Osasuna	1–2	Las Palmas	Pamplona
CET (UTC+1)

23 May 2015 40	Las Palmas	4–3	Barcelona B	Las Palmas
CET (UTC+1)

31 May 2015 41	Zaragoza	0–2	Las Palmas	Zaragoza
CET (UTC+1)

7 June 2015 42	Las Palmas	3–2	Alavés	Las Palmas
CET (UTC+1)

=== Copa del Rey ===
10 September 2014 Second round	Mallorca	0–2	Las Palmas	Palma
CEST (UTC+2)

16 October 2014 Third round	Las Palmas	2–0	Numancia	Las Palmas
CEST (UTC+2)

2 December 2014 Round of 32; First leg	Las Palmas	2–1	Celta Vigo	Las Palmas
CET (UTC+1)

16 December 2014 Round of 32; Second leg	Celta Vigo	3–1 (4–3 agg.)	Las Palmas	Vigo
CET (UTC+1)
