= 2015–16 UD Las Palmas season =

Las Palmas
2015–16 season
- President: Miguel Ángel Ramírez
- Manager: Paco Herrera
- Stadium: Estadio Gran Canaria
- La Liga: 11th
- Copa del Rey: Quarter-finals
- Top goalscorer: League: Jonathan Viera (10); All: Jonathan Viera; Willian José (10)
Home colours	Away colours

The 2015–16 season was UD Las Palmas's 32nd season in La Liga, after promotion from the Segunda División in the previous season.

== Players ==
=== First-team squad ===
Note: Flags indicate national team as defined under FIFA eligibility rules; some limited exceptions apply. Players may hold more than one non-FIFA nationality.

No.	Pos.	Nation	Player
1	GK	ESP	Raúl Lizoain
2	DF	ESP	David Simón
3	DF	PAR	Antolín Alcaraz
4	MF	ESP	Vicente Gómez
5	DF	ESP	David García (captain)
6	DF	ESP	Ángel
7	MF	ESP	Nauzet
8	FW	BRA	Willian José
9	MF	ESP	Asdrúbal Hernández
10	FW	ARG	Sergio Araujo
11	MF	ESP	Momo
12	MF	GHA	Mubarak Wakaso (on loan from Rubin Kazan)
13	GK	ESP	Javi Varas

No.	Pos.	Nation	Player
14	MF	ESP	Hernán
15	MF	ESP	Roque Mesa
16	DF	ESP	Aythami
17	DF	ESP	Pedro Bigas
18	MF	ESP	Javi Castellano
19	MF	ARG	Emmanuel Culio
20	MF	ESP	Jonathan Viera
21	MF	ESP	Juan Carlos Valerón
22	DF	ESP	Javier Garrido
23	DF	ESP	Dani Castellano
24	MF	ESP	Tana
25	MF	MAR	Nabil El Zhar
—	DF	ESP	Carlos Gutiérrez

=== Youth players ===
Note: Flags indicate national team as defined under FIFA eligibility rules; some limited exceptions apply. Players may hold more than one non-FIFA nationality.

No.	Pos.	Nation	Player
29	MF	ESP	Nili
30	GK	ESP	Ale Martín

=== Out on loan ===
Note: Flags indicate national team as defined under FIFA eligibility rules; some limited exceptions apply. Players may hold more than one non-FIFA nationality.

No.	Pos.	Nation	Player
—	DF	ESP	Christian Fernández (on loan at Huesca)
—	DF	ESP	Jesús Valentín (on loan at Huesca)
—	MF	ESP	Leo (on loan at Cacereño)
—	FW	ESP	Artiles (on loan at Racing Santander)

No.	Pos.	Nation	Player
—	FW	ESP	Alfredo Ortuño (on loan at Zaragoza)
—	FW	ESP	Héctor Figueroa (on loan at Huesca)
—	FW	ESP	Tyronne del Pino (on loan at Huesca)

== Competitions ==
=== Overall ===
Competition	Started round	Final position / round	First match	Last match
La Liga	–	38	Atlético Madrid	Málaga
Copa del Rey	Round of 32	Round 8	Real Sociedad	Valencia

Updated to match played 8 September 2015
Source: Competitions

=== Overview ===
Competition	Record							
Competition	Pld	W	D	L	GF	GA	GD	Win %
La Liga	38	12	8	18	45	53	−8	31.58
Copa del Rey	6	3	2	1	10	8	+2	50.00
Total	44	15	10	19	55	61	−6	34.09

Last updated: 16 May 2016
Source: Competitions

=== La Liga ===
==== League table ====
Pos	Team	Pld	W	D	L	GF	GA	GD	Pts
9	Real Sociedad	38	13	9	16	45	48	−3	48 (Note: Málaga finished ahead of Real Sociedad on head-to-head record; Málaga 3–1 Real Sociedad, Real Sociedad 1–1 Málaga.)
10	Real Betis	38	11	12	15	34	52	−18	45
11	Las Palmas	38	12	8	18	45	53	−8	44 (Note: Las Palmas finished ahead of Valencia on head-to-head record; Valencia 1–1 Las Palmas, Las Palmas 2–1 Valencia.)
12	Valencia	38	11	11	16	46	48	−2	44
13	Espanyol	38	12	7	19	40	74	−34	43 (Note: Espanyol finished ahead of Eibar on head-to-head goal difference; Eibar 2–1 Espanyol, Espanyol 4–2 Eibar.)

Source: La Liga, Soccerway
Rules for classification: 1) Points; 2) Head-to-head points; 3) Head-to-head goal difference; 4) Goal difference; 5) Goals scored; 6) Fair-play points; 7) Play-off.

==== Results summary ====
Overall								Home						Away					
Pld	W	D	L	GF	GA	GD	Pts	W	D	L	GF	GA	GD	W	D	L	GF	GA	GD
38	12	8	18	45	53	−8	44	8	5	6	25	17	+8	4	3	12	20	36	−16

Last updated: 16 May 2016.

==== Result round by round ====
Round	1	2	3	4	5	6	7	8	9	10	11	12	13	14	15	16	17	18	19	20	21	22	23	24	25	26	27	28	29	30	31	32	33	34	35	36	37	38
Ground	A	H	A	H	A	H	A	H	A	H	A	H	A	H	A	H	H	A	H	H	A	H	A	H	A	H	A	H	A	H	A	H	A	H	A	A	H	A
Result	L	D	D	L	W	L	L	L	D	L	W	D	L	L	W	L	W	D	D	L	L	W	L	L	L	W	W	W	L	W	W	W	D	L	W	L	D	L
Position	19	14	13	16	12	14	19	19	18	19	18	18	19	20	19	19	16	16	16	16	18	16	18	18	18	17	15	15	15	15	12	10	11	13	9	10	10	11

Updated to match(es) played on 16 May 2016. Source:
A = Away; H = Home; W = Win; D = Draw; L = Loss

==== Matches ====
Win Draw Loss

22 August 2015 1	Atlético Madrid	1–0	Las Palmas	Madrid
20:30 (UTC+2)	Griezmann 16'; Juanfran (yellow card) 57'; Torres (yellow card) 84'	Report		Stadium: Vicente Calderón; Attendance: 45,107; Referee: Eduardo Prieto Iglesias

30 August 2015 2	Las Palmas	0–0	Levante	Las Palmas
22:30 (UTC+2)	Culio (yellow card) 65'; Mesa (yellow card) 86'	Report	Deyverson (yellow card) 50'; Rubén (yellow card) 61'; Juanfran; I. López	Stadium: Gran Canaria; Attendance: 18,832; Referee: Pedro Pérez Montero

13 September 2015 3	Celta Vigo	3–3	Las Palmas	Vigo
18:15 (UTC+2)	Orellana 13' (pen.); Wass 18'; Nolito 48'	Report	Varas (red card) 11'; Araujo 23', (yellow card) 90'; Alcaraz (yellow card) 57'; Hernández 60' (o.g.); David Simón 74'; Aythami (yellow card) 90'	Stadium: Balaídos; Attendance: 19,044; Referee: Xavier Estrada Fernández

20 September 2015 4	Las Palmas	0–1	Rayo Vallecano	Las Palmas
20:30 (UTC+2)	Hernán (yellow card) 43'; Wakaso (yellow card) 62'; Araujo (yellow card) 75'	Report	Baena (yellow card) 24'; Embarba (yellow card) 28'; Amaya (yellow card) 33'; Guerra 42'; Nacho (yellow card) 60'; Raț (yellow card) 71'	Stadium: Gran Canaria; Attendance: 19,350; Referee: José González González

23 September 2015 5	Las Palmas	2–0	Sevilla	Las Palmas
22:00 (UTC+2)	Wakaso (yellow card) 9'; Mesa 30'; Aythami (yellow card) 44'; Bigas (yellow card) 57'; Alcaraz 76'	Report	Llorente (yellow card) 19'; Iborra (yellow card) 51'; Krohn-Dehli (yellow card) 67'; Reyes (yellow card) 90+3'	Stadium: Gran Canaria; Attendance: 19,942; Referee: Carlos del Cerro Grande

26 September 2015 6	Barcelona	2–1	Las Palmas	Barcelona
16:00 (UTC+2)	Suárez 25', 54', (yellow card) 90+2'; Mascherano (yellow card) 79'	Report	Hernán (yellow card) 36'; David Simón (yellow card) 56'; Wakaso (yellow card) 58'; Alcaraz (yellow card) 66'; Viera 88'	Stadium: Camp Nou; Attendance: 74,916; Referee: Ricardo de Burgos Bengoetxea

3 October 2015 7	Las Palmas	0–2	Eibar	Las Palmas
22:00 (UTC+2)	Wakaso (yellow card) 46'; Mesa (yellow card) 68'	Report	Saúl 7'; Adrián (yellow card) 36'; Escalante (yellow card) 51'; Borja 62'	Stadium: Gran Canaria; Attendance: 18,506; Referee: Antonio Mateu Lahoz

18 October 2015 8	Getafe	4–0	Las Palmas	Getafe
18:15 (UTC+2)	V. Rodríguez 3'; Sarabia 11', (yellow card) 56'; Vergini (yellow card) 49'; Šćepović 86', 90+3'	Report	Wakaso (yellow card) 22'; Culio (red card) 80'	Stadium: Coliseum Alfonso Pérez; Attendance: 5,797; Referee: David Fernández Borbalán

25 October 2015 9	Las Palmas	0–0	Villarreal	Las Palmas
16:00 (UTC+2)	Bigas (yellow card) 63'	Report	Samu (yellow card) 86'; Rukavina (yellow card) 90+2'	Stadium: Gran Canaria; Attendance: 18,284; Referee: Xavier Estrada Fernández

31 October 2015 10	Real Madrid	3–1	Las Palmas	Madrid
15:00	Isco 4'; Ronaldo 14'; Jesé 43'	Report	Hernán (yellow card) 30', (goal) 38'; Gómez (yellow card) 51'; Aythami (yellow card) 90+3'	Stadium: Santiago Bernabéu; Attendance: 69,822; Referee: Santiago Jaime Latre

6 November 2015 11	Las Palmas	2–0	Real Sociedad	Las Palmas
20:30	Bigas (yellow card) 9'; Viera 28'; Araujo 51'	Report	Illarramendi (yellow card) 36'; Vela (yellow card) 39'; I. Martínez (yellow card) 69'; Berchiche (yellow card) 85'	Stadium: Gran Canaria; Attendance: 17,796; Referee: Carlos Velasco Carballo

22 November 2015 12	Valencia	1–1	Las Palmas	Valencia
21:00 CET (UTC+01:00)	Alcácer 8'; Mustafi (yellow card) 26'; Cancelo (yellow card) 56'; Pérez (yellow card) 65'	Report	Viera 57'; Momo (yellow card) 16'; El Zhar (yellow card) 81'; David Simón (yellow card) 89'	Stadium: Mestalla; Attendance: 32,125; Referee: Pedro Pérez Montero

28 November 2015 13	Las Palmas	0–2	Deportivo	Las Palmas
22:00 (UTC+1)	David Simón (yellow card) 16'; Araujo (yellow card) 39'; Aythami (yellow card) 66'; Culio (yellow card) 90+3'	Report	David Simón 19' (o.g.); Mosquera (yellow card) 25'; Arribas (yellow card) 67'; Juanfran (yellow card) 79'; Lucas 90+1'	Stadium: Gran Canaria; Attendance: 19,148; Referee: Carlos Clos Gómez

6 December 2015 14	Sporting Gijón	3–1	Las Palmas	Gijón
18:15	Sanabria 17', 78', 84'; Hernández (yellow card) 41'; Bernardo (yellow card) 50'	Report	El Zhar 38'; Aythami (red card) 71'; David Simón (yellow card) 41'	Stadium: El Molinón; Attendance: 22,665; Referee: Alberto Undiano Mallenco

12 December 2015 15	Las Palmas	1–0	Real Betis	Las Palmas
22:05	Mesa (yellow card) 52'; Viera (yellow card) 62'; Castellano (yellow card) 64'; Willian José 90+3'	Report		Stadium: Gran Canaria; Attendance: 16,701; Referee: Jesús Gil Manzano

19 December 2015 16	Espanyol	1–0	Las Palmas	Barcelona
18:15 CET (UTC+01:00)	Diop (yellow card) 19'; Gerard (yellow card) 51'; Caicedo 67'; Pérez (yellow card) 78'; Sevilla (yellow card) 90+1'	Report	Hernán (yellow card) 34'; Aythami (yellow card) 56'; Mesa (yellow card) 60'; Willian José (yellow card) 90+4'	Stadium: Cornellà-El Prat; Attendance: 17,121; Referee: Mario Melero López

30 December 2015 17	Las Palmas	4–1	Granada	Las Palmas
21:00 CET (UTC+01:00)	Tana 32'; Araujo 50'; Mesa (yellow card) 63'; Gómez (yellow card) 72'; Viera 80' (pen.); Wakaso (yellow card) 87'	Report	Peñaranda (yellow card) 41', (goal) 56'; Márquez (yellow card) 63'; Biraghi (yellow card) 67' (yellow-red card) 86'; Ibáñez (yellow card) 78'; Rochina (yellow card) 85'	Stadium: Gran Canaria; Attendance: 18,932; Referee: Santiago Jaime Latre

3 January 2016 18	Athletic Bilbao	2–2	Las Palmas	Bilbao
18:15 CET (UTC+01:00)	Aduriz 17' (pen.); Balenziaga (yellow card) 43'; Iturraspe (yellow card) 59'; Williams 66'; De Marcos (yellow card) 80'	Report	García (yellow card) 16'; Gómez (yellow card) 22', (goal) 62'; Tana 81'; Aythami (yellow card) 84'; El Zhar (yellow card) 88'	Stadium: San Mamés; Attendance: 41,474; Referee: Carlos del Cerro Grande

10 January 2016 19	Las Palmas	1–1	Málaga	Las Palmas
18:15 CET (UTC+01:00)	Simón (yellow card) 10'; Mesa (yellow card) 43'; Tana 51'; Araujo (yellow card) 58'; Castellano (yellow card) 61'; Wakaso (yellow card) 84'	Report	Camacho (yellow card) 41'; Boka (yellow card) 56'; Santa Cruz 72'; Recio (yellow card) 75'; Duda (yellow card) 90+3'	Stadium: Gran Canaria; Attendance: 21,760; Referee: Ignacio Iglesias Villanueva

17 January 2016 20	Las Palmas	0–3	Atlético Madrid	Las Palmas
18:15 CET (UTC+01:00)		Report	Filipe Luís 17'; Fernández (yellow card) 40'; Griezmann 68', 89'; Giménez (yellow card) 70'	Stadium: Gran Canaria; Attendance: 28,515; Referee: Iñaki Vicandi Garrido

25 January 2016 21	Levante	3–2	Las Palmas	Valencia
20:30 CET (UTC+01:00)	Morales 25', 63'; Toño (yellow card) 43'; Deyverson 47', (yellow card) 57' (yellow-red card) 90+3'; Xumetra (yellow card) 74'	Report	Mesa (yellow card) 24'; Willian José 49', 66'; Varas (yellow card) 57'; Aythami (yellow card) 62'; Wakaso (yellow card) 89'	Stadium: Ciutat de València; Attendance: 13,155; Referee: Carlos Velasco Carballo

30 January 2016 22	Las Palmas	2–1	Celta Vigo	Las Palmas
20:30 CET (UTC+01:00)	David Simón (yellow card) 16'; Viera 33' (pen.); Artiles (yellow card) 42'; Willian José (yellow card) 45+1', (goal) 90'; Wakaso (yellow card) 56'; Mesa (yellow card) 66'; Momo (yellow card) 81'	Report	Bongonda 5', (yellow card) 90+2'; Mallo (yellow card) 29'; Orellana (yellow card) 32' (yellow-red card) 74'	Stadium: Gran Canaria; Attendance: 18,473; Referee: José María Sánchez Martínez

7 February 2016 23	Rayo Vallecano	2–0	Las Palmas	Madrid
18:15 (UTC+1)	Miku 3', (yellow card) 84'; Llorente (yellow card) 28'; Baena (yellow card) 39'; Bebé 74'	Report	Castellano (yellow card) 45'	Stadium: Vallecas; Attendance: 11,565; Referee: Ignacio Iglesias Villanueva

14 February 2016 24	Sevilla	2–0	Las Palmas	Sevilla
16:00 CET (UTC+01:00)	Kolodziejczak (yellow card) 64'; Banega 69'; Gameiro 75'	Report	Garrido (yellow card) 36'; Willian José (yellow card) 82'; Wakaso (yellow card) 87'	Stadium: Ramón Sánchez Pizjuán; Attendance: 34,448; Referee: Eduardo Prieto Iglesias

20 February 2016 25	Las Palmas	1–2	Barcelona	Las Palmas
16:00 CET (UTC+01:00)	Willian José 10'; Mesa (yellow card) 84'	Report	Suárez 6'; Turan (yellow card) 33'; Neymar 39'; Alves (yellow card) 86'	Stadium: Gran Canaria; Attendance: 26,951; Referee: Carlos del Cerro Grande

26 February 2016 26	Eibar	0–1	Las Palmas	Eibar
20:30 CET (UTC+01:00)	Enrich (yellow card) 54'; García (yellow card) 63'; Juncà (yellow card) 71'; Capa (yellow card) 86'	Report	Bigas 45+1'; El Zhar (yellow card) 64'	Stadium: Ipurua; Attendance: 5,115; Referee: Pedro Pérez Montero

1 March 2016 27	Las Palmas	4–0	Getafe	Las Palmas
22:00 CET (UTC+01:00)	Willian José 7', (yellow card) 90'; Bigas (yellow card) 25'; Viera 28' (pen.); Aythami (yellow card) 42'; Tana 49', 83'; Mesa (yellow card) 82'	Report	Lacen (yellow card) 27'; Pereira (yellow card) 30' (yellow-red card) 65'; Vázquez (yellow card) 77'	Stadium: Gran Canaria; Attendance: 15,819; Referee: Mario Melero López

5 March 2016 28	Villarreal	0–1	Las Palmas	Vilarreal
20:30 CET (UTC+01:00)	Soldado (yellow card) 31'	Report	García 30'; Lemos (yellow card) 53'; Montoro (yellow card) 60'	Stadium: El Madrigal; Attendance: 15,790; Referee: Carlos Clos Gómez

13 March 2016 29	Las Palmas	1–2	Real Madrid	Las Palmas
20:30 CET (UTC+01:00)	Montoro (yellow card) 38'; Lemos (yellow card) 56'; Bigas (yellow card) 60'; Viera (yellow card) 75'; Willian José 87'	Report	Casemiro (yellow card) 16', (goal) 89'; Ramos 24', (yellow card) 55' (yellow-red card) 90'; Isco (yellow card) 55'; Pepe (yellow card) 61'	Stadium: Gran Canaria; Attendance: 25,846; Referee: David Fernández Borbalán

20 March 2016 30	Real Sociedad	0–1	Las Palmas	San Sebastián
CET (UTC+01:00)	Illarramendi (yellow card) 16'; Martínez (yellow card) 28'; Elustondo (yellow card) 73'; Zurutuza (yellow card) 81'	Report	Garrido (yellow card) 20'; García (yellow card) 31'; Willian José 39'; Lemos (yellow card) 55'; Tana (yellow card) 74'; Mesa (yellow card) 90'	Stadium: Anoeta; Attendance: 18,952; Referee: Antonio Mateu Lahoz

3 April 2016 31	Las Palmas	2–1	Valencia	Las Palmas
18:15 CEST (UTC+02:00)	Willian José (yellow card) 33'; Mesa (yellow card) 36'; Viera 50' (pen.); Mustafi 63' (o.g.)	Report	Rodrigo 3'; Barragán (yellow card) 33'; Piatti (yellow card) 37'; Fuego (yellow card) 45'; Mustafi (yellow card) 68'	Stadium: Gran Canaria; Attendance: 26,950; Referee: Pedro Pérez Montero

10 April 2016 32	Deportivo	1–3	Las Palmas	A Coruña
20:30 CET (UTC+01:00)	Lucas 47'; Borges (yellow card) 77'	Report	Castellano (yellow card) 36'; Araujo 58', 90+3'; García 79'	Stadium: Riazor; Attendance: 21,686; Referee: Alfonso Álvarez Izquierdo

16 April 2016 33	Las Palmas	1–1	Sporting Gijón	Las Palmas
18:15 CET (UTC+01:00)	Bigas 3'; Lemos (yellow card) 12'; Viera (yellow card) 67'	Report	Pérez (yellow card) 2'; Mascarell (yellow card) 35'; Jony 48', (yellow card) 50'; Meré (yellow card) 55'; López (yellow card) 79'	Stadium: Gran Canaria; Attendance: 25,052; Referee: Alberto Undiano Mallenco

19 April 2016 34	Real Betis	1–0	Las Palmas	Seville
21:00 (UTC+1)	Cejudo (yellow card) 80'; Van Wolfswinkel 83', (yellow card) 86'	Report	Aythami (yellow card) 32' (yellow-red card) 41'; Willian José (yellow card) 68'	Stadium: Benito Villamarín; Attendance: 30,634; Referee: Iñaki Vicandi Garrido

22 April 2016 35	Las Palmas	4–0	Espanyol	Las Palmas
21:00 CET (UTC+01:00)	David Simón (yellow card) 11'; Gómez (yellow card) 28'; El Zhar 45+1', (yellow card) 90+2'; Viera 49'; Bigas 56'; Wakaso 75'; Castellano (yellow card) 85'	Report	Diop (yellow card) 9'; López (yellow card) 55'; Sylla (yellow card) 58'; Roco (yellow card) 69'	Stadium: Gran Canaria; Attendance: 19,358; Referee: Mario Melero López

30 April 2016 36	Granada	3–2	Las Palmas	Granada
22:05 (UTC+1)	Rochina 13'; El-Arabi 22'; Peñaranda (yellow card) 52'; Costa 70', (yellow card) 72'; Pérez (yellow card) 75'	Report	Viera 3', 12'; Wakaso (yellow card) 20'; Tana (yellow card) 85'	Stadium: Los Cármenes; Attendance: 21,291; Referee: José González González

8 May 2016 37	Las Palmas	0–0	Athletic Bilbao	Las Palmas
17:00 CET (UTC+01:00)				Stadium: Gran Canaria; Attendance: 27,410; Referee: Pedro Pérez Montero

15 May 2016 38	Málaga	4–1	Las Palmas	Málaga
13:00 CET (UTC+02:00)	Čop 26'; Charles 45' (pen.), 86'; Torres (yellow card) 82'; Atsu 84'		Willian José 31'; Lemos (yellow card) 45'	Stadium: La Rosaleda; Attendance: 17,913; Referee: Ricardo de Burgos Bengoetxea

== See also ==
- 2015–16 La Liga
