= 2016–17 UD Las Palmas season =

Las Palmas
2016–17 season
- Chairman: Miguel Ángel Ramírez
- Manager: Quique Setién
- Stadium: Estadio Gran Canaria
- La Liga: 11th
- Copa del Rey: Round of 16
- Top goalscorer: League: Kevin-Prince Boateng (10); All: Kevin-Prince Boateng (10)
Home colours	Away colours

The 2016–17 season was UD Las Palmas 49th season in existence . It covered a period from 1 July 2016 to 30 June 2017.

== Squad ==
As of 31 August 2016

Note: Flags indicate national team as defined under FIFA eligibility rules; some limited exceptions apply. Players may hold more than one non-FIFA nationality.

No.	Pos.	Nation	Player
1	GK	ESP	Raúl Lizoain
2	DF	ESP	David Simón
3	DF	URU	Mauricio Lemos
4	MF	ESP	Vicente Gómez
5	DF	ESP	David García (captain)
6	MF	ESP	Ángel Montoro
7	MF	GHA	Kevin-Prince Boateng
8	FW	MAR	Nabil El Zhar
9	FW	CRO	Marko Livaja
10	FW	ARG	Sergio Araujo
11	MF	ESP	Momo
12	DF	BRA	Michel Macedo
13	GK	ESP	Javi Varas
14	MF	ESP	Hernán

No.	Pos.	Nation	Player
15	MF	ESP	Roque Mesa
16	DF	ESP	Aythami Artiles (4th captain)
17	DF	ESP	Pedro Bigas
18	MF	ESP	Javi Castellano
19	MF	ARG	Mateo García
20	MF	CRO	Alen Halilović
21	MF	ESP	Jonathan Viera
22	DF	POR	Hélder Lopes
23	DF	ESP	Dani Castellano
24	MF	ESP	Tana
25	FW	ESP	Asdrúbal
31	GK	ESP	David Ramírez
—	FW	ESP	José Artiles

== Transfers ==
=== In ===
==== Summer ====
No.	Pos	Player	Transferred From	Fee	Date	Source
23	CF	(Ghana) Kevin-Prince	A.C. Milan			
		(Spain) Tyronne del Pino				
		(Argentina) Mateo García				
		(Spain) Asdrúbal Padrón				
		(Croatia) Marko Livaja				
		(Portugal) Hélder Lopes				
		(Brazil) Michel Macedo				

=== Loan in ===
==== Winter ====
No.	Pos	Player	From	Start	End	Source
	ATM	(Croatia) Alen Halilović	(Germany) Hamburger SV			
	FW	(Spain) Jesé	(France) Paris Saint-Germain			

== Statistics ==
=== Squad statistics ===
	League	Cup	Total Stats
Games played	38	4	0
Games won	10		
Games drawn			
Games lost			
Goals scored			
Goals conceded			
Goal difference			
Clean sheets			
Goal by Substitute			
Total shots	–	–	
Shots on target	–	–	–
Corners	–	–	–
Players used	–	–	–
Offsides	–	–	–
Fouls suffered	–	–	–
Fouls committed	–	–	–
Yellow cards			
Red cards			

=== Goalscorers ===
No.	Pos.	Nation	Name	La Liga	Copa del Rey	Total
		(Ghana)	Kevin-Prince Boateng	0	0	10
		(Spain)	Jonathan Viera	0	0	7
		(Spain)	Mauricio Lemos	0	0	0
		(Croatia)	Marko Livaja	0	0	0
		(Croatia)	Marko Livaja	0	0	7
		(Spain)	Pedro Bigas	0	0	3
		(Spain)	Pedro Bigas	0	0	0
		(Morocco)	Nabil El Zhar	0	0	0
		(Spain)	Momo	0	0	0
		(Spain)	Jesé	0	0	0
		(Argentina)	Sergio Araujo	0	0	3
		(Spain)	Mateo García	0	0	0
		(Spain)	Vicente Gómez Umpiérrez	0	0	0
		(Spain)	Tana	0	0	2
		(Spain)	Dominguez Tanausu	0	0	2
		(Spain)	David García	0	0	1
		(Spain)	Roque Mesa	0	0	1

=== Clean sheets ===
Rank	Name	La Liga	Copa del Rey	Total	Played Games
1	(Spain) Javi Varas	0	0	3	13
1	(Spain) Raúl Lizoain	0	0	2	25
Total		0	0	5	38

== Competitions ==
=== Overview ===
Competition	First match	Last match	Starting round	Final position	Record							
Competition	First match	Last match	Starting round	Final position	Pld	W	D	L	GF	GA	GD	Win %
La Liga	22 August 2016	20 May 2017	Matchday 1	14th	0	0	0	0	—	—		
Copa del Rey	1 December 2016	10 January 2017	Round of 32	Round of 16	4	2	1	1	7	5	+2	50.00
Total					4	2	1	1	7	5	+2	50.00

Last updated: 10 July 2017.
Source: Competitions

=== La Liga ===
==== League table ====
Pos	Team	Pld	W	D	L	GF	GA	GD	Pts
12	Valencia	38	13	7	18	56	65	−9	46 (Note: Málaga ahead of Valencia on head-to-head points: Valencia–Málaga 2–2, Málaga–Valencia 2–0)
13	Celta Vigo	38	13	6	19	53	69	−16	45
14	Las Palmas	38	10	9	19	53	74	−21	39 (Note: Las Palmas ahead of Real Betis on head-to-head goal difference: Las Palmas–Real Betis 4–1, Real Betis–Las Palmas 2–0)
15	Real Betis	38	10	9	19	41	64	−23	39
16	Deportivo La Coruña	38	8	12	18	43	61	−18	36

Source: La Liga, Soccerway
Rules for classification: 1) Points; 2) Head-to-head points; 3) Head-to-head goal difference; 4) Goal difference; 5) Goals scored; 6) Fair-play points; 7) Play-off.

==== Result round by round ====
Matchday	1	2	3	4	5	6	7	8	9	10	11	12	13	14	15	16	17	18	19	20	21	22	23	24	25	26	27	28	29	30	31	32	33	34	35	36	37	38
Ground	A	H	A																		A	H	H	A													H	A
Result	W	W	L	W	L	D	D	D	L	D	W	L	W	D	D	W	L	D	W	-	L	L	L	L	D	W	L	W	W	L	W	L	D	L	L	L	L	L
Position	4	1	4	3	5	7																																

Updated to match(es) played on 21 May 2017. Source:
A = Away; H = Home; W = Win; D = Draw; L = Loss

==== Matches ====
Win Draw Loss Postponed

22 August 2016 1	Valencia	2–4	Las Palmas	Valencia
22:00 CEST (UTC+02:00)	Mina 6', 34', (yellow card) 29'; Medrán (yellow card) 71'	Report	Livaja 16', 88', (yellow card) 90'; Viera 24' (pen.); Boateng 31', (yellow card) 45'	Stadium: Mestalla; Attendance: 37,144; Referee: Iñaki Vicandi Garrido

28 August 2016 2	Las Palmas	5–1	Granada	Las Palmas
18:15 CEST (UTC+2)	Livaja (yellow card) 22'; El Zhar 23', 69', (yellow card) 67'; Boateng (yellow card) 41', (goal) 51'; Momo 72'; Castellano (yellow card) 77'; Mesa (yellow card) 79'; Araujo 85'	Report	Boga 45'; Gas.Silva (yellow card) 63'	Stadium: Gran Canaria; Attendance: 18,529; Referee: Daniel Ocón Arráiz

10 September 2016 3	Sevilla	2–1	Las Palmas	Seville
18:15 (UTC+02:00)	Vázquez (yellow card) 9'; Pareja (yellow card) 54'; Sarabia 89' (pen.); Fernández 90+4'	Report	Tana 16'; Livaja (yellow card) 45'; Mesa (yellow card) 54'; Bigas (yellow card) 56' (yellow-red card) 88'; Araujo (yellow card) 81'; García (yellow card) 90+4'	Stadium: Ramón Sánchez Pizjuán; Attendance: 34,112; Referee: Juan Martínez Munuera

17 September 2016 4	Las Palmas	1–0	Málaga	Las Palmas
20:45 CEST	Momo 10'; Gómez (yellow card) 49'; Michel (yellow card) 59'; Lemos (yellow card) 71'	Report	Recio (yellow card) 9'	Stadium: Estadio Gran Canaria; Attendance: 18,904; Referee: José María Sánchez Martínez

21 September 2016 5	Real Sociedad	4–1	Las Palmas	San Sebastián
22:00 CEST	Willian José 1', 53' (pen.); Vela 22' (pen.); Zurutuza 35'; I. Martínez (yellow card) 61'	Report	Boateng (red card) 21'; David Simón (yellow card) 52'; Tana 56'; Araujo (yellow card) 80'	Stadium: Anoeta; Attendance: 10,927; Referee: José Luis Munuera Montero

24 September 2016 6	Las Palmas	2–2	Real Madrid	Las Palmas
20:45	Mesa (yellow card) 23'; Tana 38', (yellow card) 90+1'; D. García (yellow card) 54'; Araujo 85'	Report	Asensio 33'; Kroos (yellow card) 58'; Benzema 67'; Carvajal (yellow card) 77'	Stadium: Gran Canaria; Attendance: 22,364; Referee: Xavier Estrada Fernández

1 October 2016 7	Osasuna	2–2	Las Palmas	Pamplona
18:30 CEST	Torres 7' (pen.); León 45+2'; U. García (yellow card) 71'; Fausto (yellow card) 78'; Nauzet (yellow card) 90'	Report	Aythami (yellow card) 34'; Gómez 57'; Livaja (yellow card) 71'; Michel (yellow card) 74'; Tana (yellow card) 83'; D. García 90+1'	Stadium: El Sadar; Attendance: 15,208; Referee: Ignacio Iglesias Villanueva

14 October 2016 8	Las Palmas	0–0	Espanyol	Las Palmas
20:45 CEST	Livaja (yellow card) 54'; Aythami (yellow card) 85'	Summary	Fuego (yellow card) 35'; Sánchez (yellow card) 60'; Roca (yellow card) 88'	Stadium: Gran Canaria; Attendance: 20,542; Referee: David Fernández Borbalán

23 October 2016 9	Villarreal	2–1	Las Palmas	Vilarreal
18:30 CEST	Bakambu (yellow card) 48', (goal) 90+2'; Soriano (yellow card) 56'; Sansone 64' (pen.)	Report	Boateng 31', (yellow card) 79'; Mesa (yellow card) 62'; Tyronne (yellow card) 87'	Stadium: El Madrigal; Attendance: 18,312; Referee: Santiago Jaime Latre

30 October 2016 10	Las Palmas	3–3	Celta Vigo	Las Palmas
20:45 CEST	Boateng (yellow card) 50', (goal) 68'; Bigas 52'; Viera 66' (pen.); Momo (yellow card) 88'		Wass 6', (yellow card) 74'; Mallo (yellow card) 11'; Aspas 14', 21', (yellow card) 43'; Radoja (yellow card) 27'; Gómez (yellow card) 40' (yellow-red card) 65'; Hernández (yellow card) 60'; Díaz (yellow card) 90'	Stadium: Estadio Gran Canaria; Attendance: 21,194; Referee: Mario Melero López

5 November 2016 11	Las Palmas	1–0	SD Eibar	Las Palmas
20:45 CEST				Stadium: Estadio Gran Canaria; Attendance: 19,361; Referee: Carlos del Cerro Grande

18 November 2016 12	Real Betis	2–0	Las Palmas	Las Palmas
18:30 CET (UTC+01:00)	González 27'; Mandi 45+2'	Report	Gómez (yellow card) 88'	Stadium: Gran Canaria; Attendance: 34,114; Referee: José González González

28 November 2016 13	Las Palmas	3–1	Athletic Bilbao	Las Palmas
20:45 CET (UTC+01:00)	Boateng 40'; Momo 50'; Mesa (yellow card) 55'; Livaja (yellow card) 58'; Viera (yellow card) 85' (goal) 90'	Report	Laporte (yellow card) 31'; Beñat (yellow card) 38'; Yeray (yellow card) 65'; Aduriz (yellow card) 74' (yellow-red card) 74'; García 79' (pen.) (yellow card) 87'	Stadium: Gran Canaria; Attendance: 20,717; Referee: Alfonso Álvarez (Catalonia)

4 December 2016 14	Alavés	1–1	Las Palmas	Vitoria-Gasteiz
18:30 CET (UTC+01:00)	Alexis 4', (yellow card) 76'; Hernandez (yellow card) 66'; M. García (yellow card) 66'	Report	Lopes (yellow card) 9'; Livaja (yellow card) 26', (goal) 57'; Michel (yellow card) 54'	Stadium: Mendizorrotza; Attendance: 18,724; Referee: David Fernández Borbalán

10 December 2016 15	Las Palmas	1–1	Leganés	Las Palmas
18:30 CET	Livaja 21', (yellow card) 82'; Michel (yellow card) 68'; D. García (yellow card) 75'	Report	Bustinza (yellow card) 8'; Mantovani (yellow card) 22'; Díaz (yellow card) 36'; Guerrero 76' (pen.)	Stadium: Gran Canaria; Attendance: 19,131; Referee: Jesús Gil Manzano

7 January 2017 17	Las Palmas	1–0	Sporting Gijón	Las Palmas
18:30	El Zhar 55'; Momo (yellow card) 74'; Tana (yellow card) 84'	Report	Xavi Torres (yellow card) 60'; Meré (yellow card) 85'; Lillo (yellow card) 88'	Stadium: Gran Canaria; Attendance: 21,663; Referee: José Luis Munuera Montero

14 January 2017 18	Barcelona	5–0	Las Palmas	Barcelona
16:15 CET	Suárez 14', 57'; Rafinha (yellow card) 25'; Mascherano (yellow card) 29'; André Gomes (yellow card) 32'; Messi 52'; Arda 59'; Aleix Vidal 80'	Report	Roque Mesa (yellow card) 2'; Hélder Lopes (yellow card) 41'; Prince (yellow card) 54'; Livaja (yellow card) 77'	Stadium: Camp Nou; Attendance: 81,480; Referee: Alberto Undiano Mallenco

20 January 2017 19	Las Palmas	1–1	Deportivo La Coruña	Las Palmas
20:45 CET	M. García 13'; Aythami (yellow card) 72' (yellow-red card) 77'	Report	Andone 69'; Joselu (yellow card) 90+1'	Stadium: Gran Canaria; Attendance: 18,051; Referee: David Fernández Borbalán

29 January 2017 20	Las Palmas	3–1	Valencia	Las Palmas
20:45 CET	Viera 42'; Lemos 57'; Boateng 61'; Mesa (yellow card) 82'	Report	Mina 21'; Nani (yellow card) 27'; Pérez (yellow card) 44'; Munir (yellow card) 48' (yellow-red card) 51'; Parejo (yellow card) 64'	Stadium: Gran Canaria; Attendance: 20,427; Referee: Santiago Jaime Latre

6 February 2017 21	Granada	1–0	Las Palmas	Granada
20:45 CET (UTC+1)	Pereira 17', (yellow card) 31'; Uche (yellow card) 52'; Ramos (yellow card) 73'; Saunier (yellow card) 77'; Gas.Silva (yellow card) 89'	Report	Boateng (yellow card) 66'; Bigas (yellow card) 71'; Lemos (yellow card) 90+4'	Stadium: Los Cármenes; Attendance: 14,001; Referee: Carlos del Cerro Grande

12 February 2017 22	Las Palmas	0–1	Sevilla	Las Palmas
18:30 (UTC+01:00)	Lemos (yellow card) 84'; Mesa (yellow card) 87'	Report	Kranevitter (yellow card) 17'; Sarabia (yellow card) 28'; Iborra (yellow card) 77'; Correa 80', (yellow card) 80'	Stadium: Gran Canaria; Attendance: 27,843; Referee: Ricardo de Burgos Bengoetxea

20 February 2017 23	Málaga	2–1	Las Palmas	Málaga
20:45 CET	Charles (yellow card) 20', (goal) 35'; Rodríguez (yellow card) 23' (yellow-red card) 70'; Fornals 26'; Camacho (yellow card) 56'; Keko (yellow card) 69'	Report	Lemos 19'; Boateng (yellow card) 60'; Jesé (yellow card) 64'; Aythami (yellow card) 84'	Stadium: La Rosaleda; Attendance: 20,787; Referee: José María Sánchez Martínez

26 February 2017 24	Las Palmas	0–1	Real Sociedad	Las Palmas
20:45 CET	Bigas (yellow card) 11'; Aythami (yellow card) 30'	Report	Prieto (yellow card) 32', (goal) 74'; Illarramendi (yellow card) 69'	Stadium: Gran Canaria; Attendance: 19,085; Referee: Juan Martínez Munuera

1 March 2017 24	Real Madrid	3–3	Las Palmas	Madrid
21:30	Isco 8'; Carvajal (yellow card) 29'; Bale (yellow card) 47' (yellow-red card) 47'; Ramos (yellow card) 55'; Morata (yellow card) 70'; Ronaldo (yellow card) 81', (goal) 86' (pen.), 89'	Report	Tana 10'; David Simón (yellow card) 44'; Viera 56' (pen.); Boateng (yellow card) 53', (goal) 59'; Halilović (yellow card) 90+2'	Stadium: Santiago Bernabéu; Attendance: 59,575; Referee: David Fernández Borbalán

5 March 2017 26	Las Palmas	5–2	Osasuna	Las Palmas
18:30 CET	Jesé 7', 87'; Livaja (yellow card) 18', (goal) 55'; Boateng (yellow card) 19'; Mesa (yellow card) 22' (goal) 76'; Castellano (yellow card) 43'; U. García 70' (o.g.)	Report	D. García (yellow card) 11'; Kenan Kodro 31', 37', (yellow card) 63'; Mérida (yellow card) 75'; Loé (yellow card) 82'	Stadium: Gran Canaria; Referee: Carlos del Cerro Grande

10 March 2017 27	Espanyol	4–3	Las Palmas	Barcelona
20:45 CET	David López 1', (yellow card) 49'; Gerard 45+1'; Piatti (yellow card) 51', (goal) 53' (pen.); Jurado 74'	Report	Lemos 31', 49', (yellow card) 80'; Lizoain (yellow card) 51'; Bigas (yellow card) 80'; M. García 84'; Jesé (yellow card) 87'	Stadium: RCDE Stadium; Attendance: 17,669; Referee: José Luis Munuera Montero

19 March 2017 28	Las Palmas	1–0	Villarreal	Las Palmas
20:45 CET	Boateng 10'; Viera (yellow card) 70'; Lemos (yellow card) 74'; Lizoain (yellow card) 90+3'	Report	Ruiz (red card) 19'; Sansone (yellow card) 23'; Costa (yellow card) 76'	Stadium: Gran Canaria; Attendance: 18,717; Referee: Iñaki Vicandi Garrido

3 April 2017 29	Celta Vigo	3–1	Las Palmas	Vigo
20:45 CET	Rossi 12', 36', 57'; Roncaglia (yellow card) 24'; Jonny (yellow card) 45'; Cheikh (yellow card) 90+4'	Report	Bigas (yellow card) 17', (goal) 80'; Jesé (yellow card) 52'; Viera (yellow card) 90+4'	Stadium: Balaídos; Attendance: 14,212; Referee: Carlos Clos Gómez

6 April 2017 30	Eibar	3–1	Las Palmas	Ipurua Municipal Stadium
19:30 CET	Bebé 14', Artiles 24' (o.g.), Adrián 66' (pen.)			Attendance: 5,204; Referee: Ignacio Iglesias Villanueva

9 April 2017 31	Las Palmas	4–1	Real Betis	Las Palmas
20:45 CEST	Boateng (yellow card) 29', (goal) 49'; Lemos (yellow card) 30'; Gómez (yellow card) 38', (goal) 44'; Viera 62'; Jesé 83' (pen.)	Report	Toșca (yellow card) 58'; Mandi (yellow card) 65'; Pezzella (yellow card) 74'; Navarro 88', (yellow card) 90+3'	Stadium: Gran Canaria; Attendance: 19,769; Referee: José María Sánchez Martínez

14 April 2017 32	Athletic Bilbao	5–1	Las Palmas	Bilbao
20:45 CEST (UTC+02:00)	San José 7' (yellow card) 66'; Muniain 9', 58'; Aduriz 18', 59'	Report	Bigas 12'; Viera (yellow card) 60'; Livaja (yellow card) 89'	Stadium: San Mamés; Attendance: 36,502; Referee: Javier Estrada (Catalonia)

23 April 2017 33	Las Palmas	1–1	Alavés	Las Palmas
18:30 CEST	Mesa (yellow card) 22'; Boateng 44'; Michel (yellow card) 73'; D. García (yellow card) 77'; Livaja (red card) 86'; Montoro (yellow card) 90+3'	Report	Deyverson (yellow card) 56'; Ibai 61'	Stadium: Gran Canaria; Attendance: 16,007; Referee: José Luis Munuera Montero

26 April 2017 34	Leganés	3–0	Las Palmas	Leganés
	Timor (yellow card) 41'; Luciano 55', 61' (pen.); Guerrero 59'	Report		Stadium: Butarque; Attendance: 9,193; Referee: Iñaki Vicandi Garrido

29 April 2017 35	Las Palmas	0–5	Atlético Madrid	Las Palmas
18:30 CEST (UTC+02:00)	Boateng (yellow card) 6' (yellow-red card) 65'; Jesé (yellow card) 32'; Halilović (yellow card) 56'	Report	Gameiro 2', 18'; Saúl (yellow card) 14', (goal) 17'; Savić (yellow card) 31'; Gaitán (yellow card) 61'; Thomas 72', (yellow card) 89'; Torres 90+1'	Stadium: Gran Canaria; Attendance: 23,523; Referee: Ricardo de Burgos Bengoetxea; Man of the Match: Saúl

6 May 2017 36	Sporting Gijón	1–0	Las Palmas	Gijón
13:00	Sergio Álvarez 32'; Douglas (yellow card) 49'; Carmona 67'; Čop (yellow card) 71'; Canella (yellow card) 80'	Report	Roque Mesa (yellow card) 41'; Hernán (yellow card) 90+1'; Hélder (yellow card) 90+3'	Stadium: El Molinón; Attendance: 20,942; Referee: Jaime Latre

14 May 2017 37	Las Palmas	1–4	Barcelona	Las Palmas
20:00 CEST	Bigas 63'	Report	Digne (yellow card) 6'; Neymar Jr 25', 67', 71'; Suárez 27'	Stadium: Gran Canaria; Attendance: 22,204; Referee: José Luis González González

20 May 2017 38	Deportivo La Coruña	3–0	Las Palmas	A Coruña
19:00 CEST	Andone 4', 28'; Navarro (yellow card) 25'; Gil 39', (yellow card) 44'; Mosquera (yellow card) 48'; Çolak (yellow card) 54'	Summary	Mesa (yellow card) 38'; Hernán (yellow card) 51' (yellow-red card) 79'; Momo (yellow card) 54'	Stadium: Riazor; Attendance: 21,764; Referee: Mario Melero López

=== Copa del Rey ===
==== Round of 32 ====
1 December 2016	Huesca	2–2	Las Palmas	Huesca
21:00	Camacho 65'; Aguilera 71'	Report	Asdrúbal 11' (pen.); Hernán 53'	Stadium: El Alcoraz; Attendance: 2,246; Referee: I. Iglesias Villanueva

20 December 2016	Las Palmas	2–1 (4–3 agg.)	Huesca	Las Palmas
22:00	M. García 14'; Asdrúbal 60'	Report	Kilian 90'	Stadium: Gran Canaria; Attendance: 10,195; Referee: Mateu Lahoz

==== Round of 16 ====
3 January 2017 First leg	Las Palmas	0–2	Atlético Madrid	Las Palmas
21:15 CET (UTC+01:00)	Boateng (yellow card) 81'; D. García (yellow card) 81'	Report	Koke 45', (yellow card) 30'; Gabi (yellow card) 47'; Griezmann 51'; Vrsaljko (yellow card) 47'	Stadium: Gran Canaria; Attendance: 26,032; Referee: Juan Martínez Munuera

10 January 2017 Second leg	Atlético Madrid	2–3 (4–3 agg.)	Las Palmas	Madrid
21:15 CET (UTC+01:00)	Correa (yellow card) 35', (goal) 61'; Hernandez (yellow card) 45'; Griezmann 49'; Gabi (yellow card) 81'	Report	Momo (yellow card) 50'; Livaja 57', 89'; M. García 90+3'	Stadium: Vicente Calderón; Attendance: 21,357; Referee: José María Sánchez Martínez

=== Out on loan ===
Note: Flags indicate national team as defined under FIFA eligibility rules; some limited exceptions apply. Players may hold more than one non-FIFA nationality.

No.	Pos.	Nation	Player
—	MF	ESP	Leo (at Arandina until 30 June 2017)
—	FW	ESP	Jefté Betancor (at Arandina until 30 June 2017)

No.	Pos.	Nation	Player
—	FW	ESP	Héctor Figueroa (at Ponferradina until 30 June 2017)
—	FW	ESP	Alfredo Ortuño (at Cádiz until 30 June 2017)

== Player transfers ==
No.	Pos.	Nation	Player
7	MF	ESP	Nauzet Alemán (to TBD)
6	DF	ESP	Ángel (to TBD)
8	FW	BRA	Willian José (loan return to Deportivo Maldonado, later signed by Real Sociedad)
12	MF	GHA	Wakaso Mubarak (loan return to Rubin Kazan, later signed by Panathinaikos)
29	DF	ESP	Nili (to Barcelona B)
21	MF	ESP	Juan Carlos Valerón (to Unión Abrisajac)

== Awards ==
=== Manager ===
Manager	Award	Month	Source
(Spain) Quique Setién	La Liga Manager of the Month	August	
