= 2017–18 UD Las Palmas season =

UD Las Palmas
2017–18 season
- Chairman: Miguel Ángel Ramírez
- Manager: Manolo Márquez (until 26 September); Pako Ayestarán (from 27 September to 30 November); Paquito Ortiz (interim, from 30 November to 21 December); Paco Jémez (from 21 December to 25 May)
- Stadium: Gran Canaria
- La Liga: 19th (relegated)
- Copa del Rey: Round of 16
- Top goalscorer: League: Jonathan Calleri (9); All: Jonathan Calleri (12)
Home colours

During the 2017–18 season, UD Las Palmas participated in La Liga and the Copa del Rey.

== Players ==
=== First-team squad ===
As of 1 September 2017.

Note: Flags indicate national team as defined under FIFA eligibility rules; some limited exceptions apply. Players may hold more than one non-FIFA nationality.

No.	Pos.	Nation	Player
1	GK	ESP	Raúl Lizoain
2	DF	ESP	David Simón
3	DF	URU	Mauricio Lemos
4	MF	ESP	Vicente Gómez (3rd captain)
5	DF	ESP	David García (captain)
6	MF	ESP	Sergi Samper (on loan from Barcelona)
7	FW	FRA	Loïc Rémy
8	MF	CRO	Alen Halilović (on loan from Hamburger SV)
9	FW	ARG	Jonathan Calleri (on loan from Deportivo Maldonado)
10	FW	MAR	Oussama Tannane (on loan from Saint-Étienne)
11	MF	ESP	Momo
12	DF	BRA	Michel
13	GK	ARG	Leandro Chichizola

No.	Pos.	Nation	Player
14	MF	ESP	Hernán
15	DF	ESP	Borja Herrera
16	DF	ESP	Aythami (vice-captain)
17	DF	ESP	Pedro Bigas
18	MF	ESP	Javi Castellano
19	MF	ARG	Hernán Toledo (on loan from Deportivo Maldonado)
20	MF	ESP	Vitolo (on loan from Atlético Madrid)
21	MF	ESP	Jonathan Viera (4th captain)
22	DF	ESP	Ximo Navarro
23	DF	ESP	Dani Castellano
24	MF	ESP	Tana
25	MF	ITA	Alberto Aquilani
—	MF	ARG	Gabriel Peñalba

=== Reserve team ===
Note: Flags indicate national team as defined under FIFA eligibility rules; some limited exceptions apply. Players may hold more than one non-FIFA nationality.

No.	Pos.	Nation	Player
27	MF	ESP	Fabio González
28	MF	ESP	Benito
29	FW	ESP	Erik Expósito

== Transfers ==
=== In ===
Date	Player	From	Type	Fee	Ref
19 June 2017	(Spain) Ximo Navarro	(Spain) Almería	Transfer	Free	
29 June 2017	(Argentina) Leandro Chichizola	(Italy) Spezia	Transfer	Free	
30 June 2017	(Argentina) Sergio Araujo	(Greece) AEK Athens	Loan return	Free	
30 June 2017	(Spain) Héctor Figueroa	(Spain) Ponferradina	Loan return	Free	
30 June 2017	(Spain) Tyronne	(Spain) Tenerife	Loan return	Free	
30 June 2017	(Spain) Alfredo Ortuño	(Spain) Cádiz	Loan return	Free	
1 July 2017	(Spain) Borja Herrera	(Spain) Las Palmas B	Promoted		
11 July 2017	(Argentina) Jonathan Calleri	(Uruguay) Deportivo Maldonado	Loan	Free	
11 July 2017	(Argentina) Hernán Toledo	(Uruguay) Deportivo Maldonado	Loan	Free	
13 July 2017	(Spain) Vitolo	(Spain) Atlético Madrid	Loan	Undisclosed	
24 August 2017	(Spain) Sergi Samper	(Spain) Barcelona	Loan	Free	
25 August 2017	(Italy) Alberto Aquilani	(Italy) Pescara	Transfer	Free	
1 January 2018	(Argentina) Gabriel Peñalba	(Mexico) Cruz Azul	Transfer	Undisclosed	

=== Out ===
Date	Player	To	Type	Fee	Ref
13 June 2017	(Spain) Javi Varas	(Spain) Granada	Transfer	Free	
21 June 2017	(Portugal) Hélder Lopes	(Greece) AEK Athens	Transfer	Free	
30 June 2017	(Spain) Jesé	(France) Paris Saint-Germain	Loan return	Free	
1 July 2017	(Croatia) Marko Livaja	(Greece) AEK Athens	Loan	Free	
6 July 2017	(Spain) Roque Mesa	(Wales) Swansea City	Transfer	€12,500,000	
8 July 2017	(Spain) Héctor Figueroa	(Spain) Toledo	Transfer	Free	
13 July 2017	(Argentina) Mateo García	(Spain) Osasuna	Loan	Free	
15 July 2017	(Spain) Ángel Montoro	(Spain) Granada	Transfer	Free	
15 July 2017	(Spain) Tyronne	(Spain) Tenerife	Transfer	Free	
16 August 2017	(Ghana) Kevin-Prince Boateng	TBD			

== Competitions ==
=== Overall ===
Competition	Final position
La Liga	-
Copa del Rey	-

=== Liga ===
==== League table ====
Pos	Team	Pld	W	D	L	GF	GA	GD	Pts	Qualification or relegation
16	Athletic Bilbao	38	10	13	15	41	49	−8	43 (Note: Athletic Bilbao finished ahead of Leganés on head-to-head goal difference: Athletic Bilbao 2–0 Leganés, Leganés 1–0 Athletic Bilbao.)	
17	Leganés	38	12	7	19	34	51	−17	43	
18	Deportivo La Coruña (R)	38	6	11	21	38	76	−38	29	Relegation to Segunda División
19	Las Palmas (R)	38	5	7	26	24	74	−50	22	Relegation to Segunda División
20	Málaga (R)	38	5	5	28	24	61	−37	20	Relegation to Segunda División

Source: La Liga, Soccerway
Rules for classification: 1) Points; 2) Head-to-head points; 3) Head-to-head goal difference; 4) Goal difference; 5) Goals scored; 6) Fair-play points (Note: Head-to-head record is used only after all the matches between the teams in question have been played)
(R) Relegated

==== Matches ====
Win Draw Loss Fixtures

18 August 2017 1	Valencia	1–0	Las Palmas	Valencia
22:15 CEST (UTC+02:00)	Zaza (yellow card) 9', (goal) 22'; Parejo (yellow card) 40'; Gayà (yellow card) 71'	Report	Halilović (red card) 33'; Navarro (yellow card) 47'; Bigas (yellow card) 67'; David Simón (yellow card) 80'	Stadium: Mestalla; Attendance: 36,019; Referee: Jesús Gil Manzano

26 August 2017 2	Las Palmas	1–5	Atlético Madrid	Las Palmas
22:15 CEST (UTC+02:00)	Calleri 58'; Hernán (yellow card) 14'; Bigas (yellow card) 24'; González (yellow card) 39'; Viera (yellow card) 62'	Report	Correa 3'; Carrasco 5'; Koke 62', 75'; Thomas 88'; Vietto (yellow card) 39'	Stadium: Gran Canaria; Attendance: 20,310; Referee: Ignacio Iglesias Villanueva

11 September 2017 3	Málaga	1–3	Las Palmas	Málaga
21:00 CEST (UTC+02:00)	Adrián (yellow card) 23'; González 48'; Recio (yellow card) 61'; Borja Bastón (yellow card) 65'; Ontiveros (yellow card) 82'	Report	Viera 45'; D. Castellano (yellow card) 67'; Calleri 69'; Michel (yellow card) 80'; Rémy 88'	Stadium: La Rosaleda; Attendance: 22,697; Referee: Xavier Estrada Fernández

17 September 2017 4	Las Palmas	1–0	Athletic Bilbao	Las Palmas
18:30 CEST (UTC+02:00)	Calleri (yellow card) 58'; Tannane (yellow card) 63'; Rémy 87'	Report	Laporte (yellow card) 60'; Aduriz (yellow card) 64'; Vesga (yellow card) 77'	Stadium: Gran Canaria; Attendance: 19,213; Referee: Pablo González Fuertes

20 September 2017 5	Sevilla	1–0	Las Palmas	Seville
22:00 CEST (UTC+02:00)	Mercado (yellow card) 44'; Navas 84', (yellow card) 89'	Report	García (yellow card) 1'; Momo (yellow card) 76'	Stadium: Ramón Sánchez Pizjuán; Attendance: 35,317; Referee: José González González

24 September 2017 6	Las Palmas	0–2	Leganés	Las Palmas
18:30 CEST (UTC+02:00)	Lemos (yellow card) 66'	Report	Beauvue 47'; Eraso 90+6'; García (yellow card) 16'; Brašanac (yellow card) 58'; Zaldua (yellow card) 86'	Stadium: Gran Canaria; Attendance: 17,560; Referee: Javier Alberola Rojas

1 October 2017 7	Barcelona	3–0	Las Palmas	Barcelona
16:15 CEST (UTC+2:00)	Paulinho (yellow card) 33'; Piqué (yellow card) 35'; Busquets (yellow card) 45', (goal) 49'; Alba (yellow card) 46'; L. Suárez (yellow card) 51'; Messi 70', 77'	Report	Navarro (yellow card) 59'	Stadium: Camp Nou; Attendance: 0 Referee: José Luis Munuera Montero

16 October 2017 8	Las Palmas	2–5	Celta Vigo	Las Palmas
21:00 CEST (UTC+02:00)	Bigas (yellow card) 51'; Aquilani (yellow card) 61'; Vitolo 90'; Rémy 90+3'	Report	Mor 16'; Aspas 20', 49', 76'; Jozabed (yellow card) 27'; Blanco (red card) 52'; Hernández 71'	Stadium: Gran Canaria; Attendance: 15,799; Referee: David Medié Jiménez

22 October 2017 9	Villarreal	4–0	Las Palmas	Villarreal
12:00 CEST (UTC+02:00)	Ruiz (yellow card) 30'; Bakambu 48'; Mario Gaspar 65'; Navarro 67' (o.g.); Sansone 90+3'	Report	Lemos (yellow card) 24'; Gómez (yellow card) 40'; Navarro (yellow card) 73'; Viera (yellow card) 75'; Michel (yellow card) 86'	Stadium: La Cerámica; Attendance: 16,709; Referee: David Fernández Borbalán

30 October 2017 10	Las Palmas	1–3	Deportivo La Coruña	Las Palmas
21:00 CEST (UTC+02:00)	Rémy 7'; Michel (yellow card) 45'	Report	Borges 36', 54'; Pérez 69' (pen.); Juanfran (yellow card) 90+4'	Stadium: Gran Canaria; Attendance: 14,769; Referee: Carlos del Cerro Grande

5 November 2017 11	Real Madrid	3–0	Las Palmas	Madrid
20:45	Casemiro 41'; Isco (yellow card) 45', (goal) 74'; Asensio 56'; Kroos (yellow card) 64'	Report	Navarro (yellow card) 79'	Stadium: Santiago Bernabéu; Attendance: 63,326; Referee: José María Sánchez Martínez

19 November 2017 12	Las Palmas	0–2	Levante	Las Palmas
18:30 CET (UTC+01:00)	Lemos (yellow card) 57'	Report	Campaña (yellow card) 18'; Doukouré 71'; Oier (yellow card) 73'; Jason 79'; Toño (yellow card) 81'; Morales (yellow card) 89'	Stadium: Gran Canaria; Referee: Mario Melero López

26 November 2017 13	Real Sociedad	2–2	Las Palmas	San Sebastián
16:15 CET (UTC+01:00)	Willian José 31'; Januzaj 62', (yellow card) 64'; Odriozola (yellow card) 83' (yellow-red card) 90+4'; Llorente (yellow card) 90+2'	Report	Tana 20'; D. Castellano (yellow card) 40'; Viera 67'; Aquilani (yellow card) 69'; Rémy (yellow card) 72'	Stadium: Anoeta; Attendance: 19,745; Referee: Pablo González Fuertes

3 December 2017 14	Las Palmas	1–0	Real Betis	Las Palmas
20:45 CET (UTC+01:00)	Calleri 19'; Lemos (yellow card) 33'	Report	Joaquín (yellow card) 32'; Camarasa (yellow card) 39'; Barragán (yellow card) 61'; Amat (yellow card) 63' (yellow-red card) 90+2'; Feddal (yellow card) 68'; Guardado (yellow card) 70'	Stadium: Gran Canaria; Attendance: 16,215; Referee: Xavier Estrada Fernández

8 December 2017 15	Alavés	2–0	Las Palmas	Vitoria-Gasteiz
21:00 CET (UTC+01:00)	Ibai 23'; Munir 55', (yellow card) 69'; Pina (yellow card) 57'	Report		Stadium: Mendizorrotza; Attendance: 18,567; Referee: David Medié Jiménez

17 December 2017 16	Las Palmas	2–2	Espanyol	Las Palmas
18:30 CET (UTC+01:00)	Lemos (yellow card) 20'; Tana (yellow card) 39'; J. Castellano (yellow card) 58'; Rémy 80'; Calleri 89'	Report	Gerard 19', 41', (yellow card) 34'; V. Sánchez (yellow card) 37'; Granero (yellow card) 78'	Stadium: Gran Canaria; Attendance: 13,976; Referee: José María Sánchez Martínez

20 December 2017 17	Getafe	2–0	Las Palmas	Getafe
19:30 CET (UTC+01:00)	Cala 6', (yellow card) 60'; Amath 15'; Suárez (yellow card) 21'; Antunes (yellow card) 56'	Report	David Simón (yellow card) 68'	Stadium: Coliseum Alfonso Pérez; Attendance: 9,231; Referee: Ricardo de Burgos Bengoetxea

6 January 2018 18	Las Palmas	1–2	Eibar	Las Palmas
18:30 CET (UTC+01:00)	Viera 32' (pen.); D. Castellano (yellow card) 42'; Toledo (yellow card) 57'; Lemos (yellow card) 63'	Report	Enrich (yellow card) 18', (goal) 77'; Arbilla (yellow card) 31'; Orellana 73'; Inui (yellow card) 84'	Stadium: Gran Canaria; Attendance: 11,987; Referee: José González González

13 January 2018 19	Girona	6–0	Las Palmas	Girona
13:00 CET (UTC+01:00)	Stuani 25' (pen.); Granell (yellow card) 52'; Pons (yellow card) 54'; Olunga 57', 70', 79'; B. García 64'; Portu 74'	Report	J. Castellano (yellow card) 24'; Peñalba (yellow card) 53'; Viera (yellow card) 53'; Calleri (yellow card) 54'; D. García (yellow card) 57'	Stadium: Montilivi; Attendance: 10,037; Referee: Mario Melero López

20 January 2018 20	Las Palmas	2–1	Valencia	Las Palmas
20:45 CET (UTC+01:00)	Viera 20'; Calleri 53' (pen.); Jairo (yellow card) 73'; Halilović (yellow card) 76'	Report	Mina 5'; Lato (yellow card) 21'; Vezo (yellow card) 26' (yellow-red card) 87'; Gabriel (yellow card) 52' (yellow-red card) 52'; Montoya (yellow card) 62'; Zaza (yellow card) 70'; Neto (yellow card) 72'	Stadium: Gran Canaria; Attendance: 20,242; Referee: José Luis Munuera Montero

28 January 2018 21	Atlético Madrid	3–0	Las Palmas	Madrid
16:15 CET (UTC+01:00)	Griezmann 61'; Torres 73'; Saúl (yellow card) 82'; Thomas 88'	Report	Navarro (yellow card) 67'; Gálvez (yellow card) 85'	Stadium: Wanda Metropolitano; Attendance: 55,241; Referee: Alfonso Álvarez Izquierdo

5 February 2018 22	Las Palmas	1–0	Málaga	Las Palmas
21:00 CET (UTC+01:00)	Peñalba (yellow card) 35'; Halilović 90'; Tana (yellow card) 90+3'	Report	Miquel (yellow card) 35'; Recio (yellow card) 40'; Keko (yellow card) 76'	Stadium: Gran Canaria; Attendance: 17,331; Referee: Ricardo de Burgos Bengoetxea

9 February 2018 23	Athletic Bilbao	0–0	Las Palmas	Bilbao
21:00 CET (UTC+01:00)	Aduriz (yellow card) 12'; Saborit (yellow card) 51'; Kepa (yellow card) 52'; García (yellow card) 77'	Report	Navarro (yellow card) 12'; Calleri (yellow card) 41'; Michel (yellow card) 59'; Chichizola (yellow card) 79'	Stadium: San Mamés; Attendance: 33,839; Referee: Xavier Estrada Fernández

17 February 2018 24	Las Palmas	1–2	Sevilla	Las Palmas
13:00 CET (UTC+01:00)	Peñalba (yellow card) 24'; Calleri 82' (pen.); Viera (yellow card) 90+4'	Report	Pizarro (yellow card) 29'; Ben Yedder 35'; Sarabia 50'; Lenglet (yellow card) 72'; Mesa (yellow card) 90'	Stadium: Gran Canaria; Attendance: 19,120; Referee: Ignacio Iglesias Villanueva

24 February 2018 25	Leganés	0–0	Las Palmas	Leganés
18:30 CET (UTC+01:00)	Gabriel (yellow card) 66'; Guerrero (yellow card) 74'; Pérez (yellow card) 90+2'; Siovas (yellow card) 90+3'	Report	Navarro (yellow card) 38'; Toledo (yellow card) 87'; Aquilani (yellow card) 89'; Chichizola (yellow card) 90+2'; Calleri (yellow card) 90+3'	Stadium: Butarque; Attendance: 8,817; Referee: Santiago Jaime Latre

1 March 2018 26	Las Palmas	1–1	Barcelona	Las Palmas
21:00 CET (UTC+01:00)	Aguirregaray (yellow card) 5'; D. Castellano (yellow card) 10'; Navarro (yellow card) 20'; Calleri 48' (pen.), (yellow card) 90+4'; Etebo (yellow card) 66'; Gámez (yellow card) 68'	Report	Messi 21'; Digne (yellow card) 24'; Roberto (yellow card) 41'; Umtiti (yellow card) 52'	Stadium: Gran Canaria; Attendance: 23,778; Referee: Antonio Mateu Lahoz

5 March 2018 27	Celta Vigo	2–1	Las Palmas	Vigo
21:00 CET (UTC+01:00)	Jonny 62'; Lobotka (yellow card) 81'; Hernández 89'	Report	Aquilani (yellow card) 18'; Expósito 53'; Navarro (yellow card) 72'	Stadium: Balaídos; Attendance: 11,458; Referee: Ricardo de Burgos Bengoetxea

11 March 2018 28	Las Palmas	0–2	Villarreal	Las Palmas
18:30 CET (UTC+01:00)	Navarro (yellow card) 61'; Gálvez (red card) 90+1'	Report	Costa (yellow card) 17'; Bacca 67'; Sansone 90+2' (pen.)	Stadium: Gran Canaria; Attendance: 18,855; Referee: David Medié Jiménez

17 March 2018 29	Deportivo La Coruña	1–1	Las Palmas	A Coruña
13:00 CEST (UTC+02:00)	Albentosa 22'; Navarro (yellow card) 27'; Muntari (yellow card) 47'; Guilherme (yellow card) 84'	Report	Halilović 3'; Momo (yellow card) 20'; J. Castellano (yellow card) 53'; David Simón (yellow card) 65'	Stadium: Riazor; Attendance: 18,966; Referee: Juan Martínez Munuera

31 March 2018 30	Las Palmas	0–3	Real Madrid	Las Palmas
18:30 CEST (UTC+02:00)	Momo (yellow card) 36'; Gálvez (yellow card) 45+2'; Navarro (yellow card) 51'	Report	Bale 26', 51' (pen.); Benzema 39' (pen.)	Stadium: Gran Canaria; Attendance: 22,785; Referee: Pablo González Fuertes

8 April 2018 31	Levante	2–1	Las Palmas	Valencia
12:00 CEST (UTC+02:00)	Morales (yellow card) 25'; Coke 35', (yellow card) 61' (yellow-red card) 86'; Lerma (yellow card) 42'; Róber (yellow card) 54'; Campaña 90+2', (yellow card) 90+3'; Rochina (red card) 90+3'	Summary	J. Castellano (yellow card) 12'; Aguirregaray (yellow card) 35'; García 50'; Gálvez (yellow card) 68'	Stadium: Ciutat de València; Attendance: 17,895; Referee: David Fernández Borbalán

14 April 2018 32	Las Palmas	0–1	Real Sociedad	Las Palmas
18:30 CEST (UTC+02:00)		Summary	Oyarzabal 21'; Canales (yellow card) 79'; Illarramendi (yellow card) 82'	Stadium: Gran Canaria; Attendance: 10,480; Referee: Alfonso Álvarez Izquierdo

19 April 2018 33	Betis	1–0	Las Palmas	Seville
21:30 CEST (UTC+02:00)	León (yellow card) 65'; Mandi (yellow card) 77'; Firpo 90+4', (yellow card) 90+5'	Summary	Calleri (yellow card) 32'; Gil (yellow card) 35'; Michel (yellow card) 68' (yellow-red card) 86'; Navarro (yellow card) 87'	Stadium: Benito Villamarín; Attendance: 45,210; Referee: José María Sánchez Martínez

22 April 2018 34	Las Palmas	0–4	Alavés	Las Palmas
18:30 CEST (UTC+02:00)	Aguirregaray (yellow card) 26'; Gálvez (yellow card) 90'	Summary	Duarte (yellow card) 39'; Ely (yellow card) 49'; Munir 51', 73'; Medrán 79'; Sobrino 90+1'	Stadium: Gran Canaria; Attendance: 7,083; Referee: Mario Melero López

28 April 2018 35	Espanyol	1–1	Las Palmas	Cornellà de Llobregat
13:00 CEST (UTC+02:00)	V. Sánchez (yellow card) 22'; Vilà (yellow card) 25'; Gerard 76'	Summary	Calleri (yellow card) 27', (goal) 29' (pen.); Etebo (yellow card) 35'; Gómez (yellow card) 79'; D. Castellano (yellow card) 90+2'	Stadium: RCDE Stadium; Attendance: 13,375; Referee: Pablo González Fuertes

6 May 2018 36	Las Palmas	0–1	Getafe	Las Palmas
18:30 CEST (UTC+02:00)		Summary	Rémy (yellow card) 44'; Ndockyt (yellow card) 85'; Ángel 88'	Stadium: Gran Canaria; Attendance: 4,624; Referee: Alberto Undiano Mallenco

12 May 2018 37	Eibar	1–0	Las Palmas	Eibar
18:30 CEST (UTC+02:00)	Charles 5'; Escalante (yellow card) 33'; García (yellow card) 42'; Inui (yellow card) 90+4'	Summary	Gómez (yellow card) 37'	Stadium: Ipurua; Attendance: 5,107; Referee: Antonio Mateu Lahoz

19 May 2018 38	Las Palmas	1–2	Girona	Las Palmas
18:30 CEST (UTC+02:00)	Calleri 14' (pen.); Etebo (yellow card) 59'	Summary	Stuani 5', 42'; Pons (yellow card) 13' Aday (yellow card) 21'	Stadium: Gran Canaria; Attendance: 6,368; Referee: Santiago Jaime Latre

=== Copa del Rey ===
==== Round of 32 ====
26 October 2017	Deportivo La Coruña	1–4	Las Palmas	A Coruña
20:30	Pérez 59'	Report	Momo 8', 16'; Calleri 81', 90'	Stadium: Abanca-Riazor; Attendance: 26,735; Referee: Antonio Mateu Lahoz

29 November 2017	Las Palmas	2–3 (6–4 agg.)	Deportivo La Coruña	Las Palmas
21:30	Toledo 58'; Rémy 90+4'	Report	Çolak 42'; Valle 53', 80'	Stadium: Gran Canaria; Attendance: 7,558

==== Round of 16 ====
3 January 2018	Las Palmas	1–1	Valencia	Las Palmas
21:00	Calleri 36', (yellow card) 90+3'; Gálvez (yellow card) 62'; Navarro (yellow card) 78'	Report	Zaza (yellow card) 76'; Rodrigo 85'	Stadium: Gran Canaria; Attendance: 16,685; Referee: Alberto Undiano Mallenco

9 January 2018	Valencia	4–0 (5–1 agg.)	Las Palmas	Valencia
21:30	Vietto 30', 48', 66'; Maksimović 54'; Lato (yellow card) 81'	Report	García (yellow card) 90'	Stadium: Mestalla; Attendance: 27,869; Referee: Carlos del Cerro Grande

== Statistics ==
=== Appearances and goals ===
No.	Pos	Nat	Player	Total		La Liga		Copa del Rey	
No.	Pos	Nat	Player	Apps	Goals	Apps	Goals	Apps	Goals
Goalkeepers
1	GK	(Spain) ESP	Raúl Lizoain	13	0	11	0	2	0
13	GK	(Argentina) ARG	Leandro Chichizola	29	0	27	0	2	0
Defenders
2	DF	(Spain) ESP	David Simón	15	0	6+5	0	4	0
3	DF	(Uruguay) URU	Matías Aguirregaray	15	0	14+1	0	0	0
5	DF	(Spain) ESP	David García	12	1	9+2	1	1	0
12	DF	(Brazil) BRA	Michel	28	0	26+2	0	0	0
16	DF	(Spain) ESP	Aythami	4	0	2+1	0	1	0
17	DF	(Spain) ESP	Pedro Bigas	14	0	11+1	0	2	0
20	DF	(Spain) ESP	Álex Gálvez	19	0	18	0	1	0
22	DF	(Spain) ESP	Ximo Navarro	33	0	29+2	0	1+1	0
23	DF	(Spain) ESP	Dani Castellano	26	0	23+1	0	2	0
Midfielders
4	MF	(Spain) ESP	Vicente Gómez	28	0	17+8	0	3	0
6	MF	(Nigeria) NGR	Peter Etebo	14	0	14	0	0	0
7	MF	(Argentina) ARG	Gabriel Peñalba	7	0	7	0	0	0
8	MF	(Croatia) CRO	Alen Halilović	21	2	16+4	2	1	0
11	MF	(Spain) ESP	Momo	15	2	8+5	0	2	2
15	MF	(Spain) ESP	Nacho Gil	14	0	8+6	0	0	0
18	MF	(Spain) ESP	Javi Castellano	27	0	17+6	0	2+2	0
19	MF	(Argentina) ARG	Hernán Toledo	17	1	6+9	0	1+1	1
20	MF	(Spain) ESP	Vitolo	11	1	8+1	1	2	0
21	MF	(Spain) ESP	Jonathan Viera	25	4	23	4	2	0
24	MF	(Spain) ESP	Tana	27	1	16+8	1	2+1	0
25	MF	(Italy) ITA	Alberto Aquilani	23	0	15+6	0	1+1	0
27	MF	(Spain) ESP	Fabio González	1	0	1	0	0	0
—	MF	(Spain) ESP	Sergi Samper	5	0	2	0	2+1	0
Forwards
9	FW	(Argentina) ARG	Jonathan Calleri	41	12	34+3	9	3+1	3
10	FW	(Morocco) MAR	Oussama Tannane	11	0	7+3	0	0+1	0
14	FW	(Nigeria) NGR	Imoh Ezekiel	10	0	5+5	0	0	0
16	FW	(Spain) ESP	Jairo	12	0	6+5	0	1	0
28	FW	(Spain) ESP	Benito	4	0	1+3	0	0	0
29	FW	(Spain) ESP	Erik Expósito	10	1	4+6	1	0	0
—	FW	(Nigeria) NGR	Emmanuel Emenike	0	0	0	0	0	0
Players transferred out during the season
3	DF	(Uruguay) URU	Mauricio Lemos	18	0	14+2	0	2	0
7	FW	(France) FRA	Loïc Rémy	13	6	6+6	5	0+1	1
10	FW	(Argentina) ARG	Sergio Araujo	2	0	0+2	0	0	0
14	MF	(Spain) ESP	Hernán	10	0	4+3	0	2+1	0
15	DF	(Spain) ESP	Borja Herrera	6	0	3	0	2+1	0

Last updated: 30 May 2018
Source: BDFutbol

=== Cards ===
Accounts for all competitions. Last updated on 22 December 2017.

No.	Pos.	Name	Yellow card	Red card
2	DF	(Spain) David Simón	3	0
3	DF	(Uruguay) Mauricio Lemos	5	0
4	MF	(Spain) Vicente Gómez	2	0
5	DF	(Spain) David García	1	0
6	MF	(Spain) Sergi Samper	1	0
7	FW	(France) Loïc Rémy	1	0
8	MF	(Croatia) Alen Halilović	0	1
9	FW	(Argentina) Jonathan Calleri	1	0
10	FW	(Morocco) Oussama Tannane	2	0
11	MF	(Spain) Momo	1	0
12	DF	(Brazil) Michel Macedo	3	0
14	MF	(Spain) Hernán	1	0
17	DF	(Spain) Pedro Bigas	3	0
18	DF	(Spain) Javi Castellano	1	0
21	MF	(Spain) Jonathan Viera	3	0
22	DF	(Spain) Ximo Navarro	4	0
23	DF	(Spain) Dani Castellano	2	0
24	MF	(Spain) Tana	2	0
25	MF	(Italy) Alberto Aquilani	2	0
27	MF	(Spain) Fabio González	1	0

=== Clean sheets ===
Last updated on 22 December 2017.

Number	Nation	Name	Matches Played	La Liga	Copa del Rey	Total
1	(Spain)	Raúl Lizoain	9	1	0	1
13	(Argentina)	Leandro Chichizola	10	1	0	1
TOTALS				2	0	2
