= Pedro Bigas =

Spanish footballer

Personal information
- Full name: Pedro Bigas Rigo
- Date of birth: 15 May 1990 (age 36)
- Place of birth: Palma, Spain
- Height: 1.81 m (5 ft 11 in)
- Positions: Defender; midfielder

Team information
- Current team: Elche
- Number: 6

Youth career
- La Salle
- Mallorca

Senior career*
Years	Team	Apps	(Gls)
2009–2010	Montuïri	33	(11)
2010–2011	Atlético Baleares	26	(1)
2011–2012	Mallorca B	11	(1)
2011–2015	Mallorca	99	(4)
2015–2019	Las Palmas	71	(7)
2018–2019	→ Eibar (loan)	10	(0)
2019–2021	Eibar	44	(3)
2021–	Elche	146	(5)
- * Club domestic league appearances and goals as of 27 May 2026

Pedro Bigas Rigo (born 15 May 1990) is a Spanish professional footballer who plays as a defender or a midfielder for La Liga club Elche.

== Club career ==
=== Mallorca ===
Born in Palma de Mallorca, Balearic Islands, Bigas made his debut as a senior with CD Montuïri in 2009, in the Tercera División. On 9 July 2010, he signed for Segunda División B club CD Atlético Baleares.

Bigas joined RCD Mallorca on 20 June 2011, being initially assigned to the reserves also in the third division. He made his first-team – and La Liga – debut on 1 October, starting in a 2–2 away draw against CA Osasuna as a left-back.

On 28 August 2012, Bigas renewed his contract until 2015, being definitely promoted to the main squad and given the number 17 jersey. On 22 October he scored his first professional goal, opening the 3–2 loss at Sevilla FC. He was occasionally used as a defensive midfielder during the season, as his side suffered relegation.

=== Las Palmas and Eibar ===
On 13 July 2015, Bigas agreed to a two-year deal at UD Las Palmas, newly promoted to the top flight. He scored a career-best four times in the 2016–17 campaign, in a 14th-place finish.

On 31 July 2018, after being relegated, Bigas was loaned to SD Eibar of the same tier, with a buyout clause. The following May, he joined them permanently.

=== Elche ===
On 7 July 2021, Elche CF reached an agreement with Eibar for the transfer of Bigas, who joined the former on a two-year contract.

== Career statistics ==
As of match played 1 June 2025

Appearances and goals by club, season and competition
Club	Season	League			National cup		Other		Total	
Club	Season	Division	Apps	Goals	Apps	Goals	Apps	Goals	Apps	Goals
Atlético Baleares	2010–11	Segunda División B	26	1	1	0	—		27	1
Mallorca B	2011–12	Segunda División B	11	1	—		—		11	1
Mallorca	2011–12	La Liga	16	0	4	0	—		20	0
Mallorca	2012–13	La Liga	24	1	3	0	—		27	1
Mallorca	2013–14	Segunda División	31	2	1	0	—		32	2
Mallorca	2014–15	Segunda División	28	1	0	0	—		28	1
Mallorca	Total		99	4	8	0	—		107	4
Las Palmas	2015–16	La Liga	27	3	1	0	—		28	3
Las Palmas	2016–17	La Liga	32	4	1	0	—		33	4
Las Palmas	2017–18	La Liga	12	0	2	0	—		14	0
Las Palmas	Total		71	7	4	0	—		75	7
Eibar (loan)	2018–19	La Liga	10	0	2	0	—		12	0
Eibar	2019–20	La Liga	23	3	1	0	—		24	3
Eibar	2020–21	La Liga	21	0	1	0	—		22	0
Eibar	Total		44	3	2	0	—		46	3
Elche	2021–22	La Liga	19	1	0	0	—		19	1
Elche	2022–23	La Liga	28	0	1	0	—		29	0
Elche	2023–24	Segunda División	38	1	1	0	—		39	1
Elche	2024–25	Segunda División	33	2	2	0	—		35	2
Elche	Total		118	4	4	0	—		122	4
Career total			379	20	20	0	0	0	400	20
