= Hernán Toledo =

Argentine footballer

Personal information
- Full name: Hernán Darío Toledo
- Date of birth: 17 January 1996 (age 30)
- Place of birth: Sastre, Santa Fe, Argentina
- Height: 1.80 m (5 ft 11 in)
- Position: Winger

Team information
- Current team: Deportivo Maldonado
- Number: 11

Youth career
- Atlético Sastre
- 2011: Sportivo Belgrano
- 2011–2015: Vélez Sarsfield

Senior career*
Years	Team	Apps	(Gls)
2015–2016	Vélez Sarsfield	19	(1)
2016–	Deportivo Maldonado	79	(4)
2016–2017	→ Fiorentina (loan)	0	(0)
2017	→ Lanús (loan)	9	(1)
2017–2018	→ Las Palmas (loan)	15	(0)
2018–2019	→ Argentinos Juniors (loan)	7	(0)
2019	→ Banfield (loan)	0	(0)
2022–	→ Estudiantes (loan)	10	(0)
- * Club domestic league appearances and goals as of 15 September 2024

Hernán Darío Toledo (born 17 January 1996) is an Argentine footballer who plays as a winger for Uruguayan club Deportivo Maldonado.

== Club career ==
Toledo debuted professionally for Vélez Sarsfield in the 2015 Argentine Primera División season, entering the field in a 0–1 defeat to Estudiantes de La Plata. He scored his first goal in the first division in a 3–0 victory against Argentinos Juniors, for the 2016 Argentine Primera División.

In July 2016, Toledo's federative rights were assigned to Deportivo Maldonado for a reported US$ 7.5 million fee, and he was loaned to Serie A side ACF Fiorentina for one year. After failing to make a single appearance for the side, he moved to Lanús the following 17 February until the end of the season.

On 11 July 2017, Toledo joined La Liga side UD Las Palmas on a one-year loan deal. In August 2018, he was then loaned out to Argentinos Juniors. After appointment of new manager Diego Dabove in January 2019, Toledo wasn't a part of the new managers plans, and was therefore sent back home to Maldonado.

In January 2022, Toledo returned to Argentina, signing a one-year loan deal with Estudiantes, including a purchase option.

== Career statistics ==
As of 25 September 2022

Appearances and goals by club, season and competition
Club	Division	League			Cup		Continental		Total	
Club	Division	Season	Apps	Goals	Apps	Goals	Apps	Goals	Apps	Goals
Vélez Sarsfield	Argentine Primera División	2015	6	0	0	0	—		6	0
Vélez Sarsfield	Argentine Primera División	2016	13	1	0	0	—		13	1
Vélez Sarsfield	Total		19	1	0	0	0	0	19	1
Fiorentina	Serie A	2016-17	0	0	0	0	0	0	0	0
Lanús	Argentine Primera División	2016-17	9	1	—		2	0	11	1
Las Palmas	La Liga	2017-18	15	0	2	1	—		17	1
Argentinos Juniors	Argentine Primera División	2018-19	7	0	1	0	—		8	0
Banfield	Argentine Primera División	2019-20	0	0	0	0	—		0	0
Deportivo Maldonado	Uruguayan Primera División	2020-21	28	1	0	0	—		28	1
Estudiantes	Argentine Primera División	2022	4	0	6	0	1	0	11	0
Career total			98	4	9	1	3	0	110	5
