= Jesé =

Spanish footballer (born 1993)

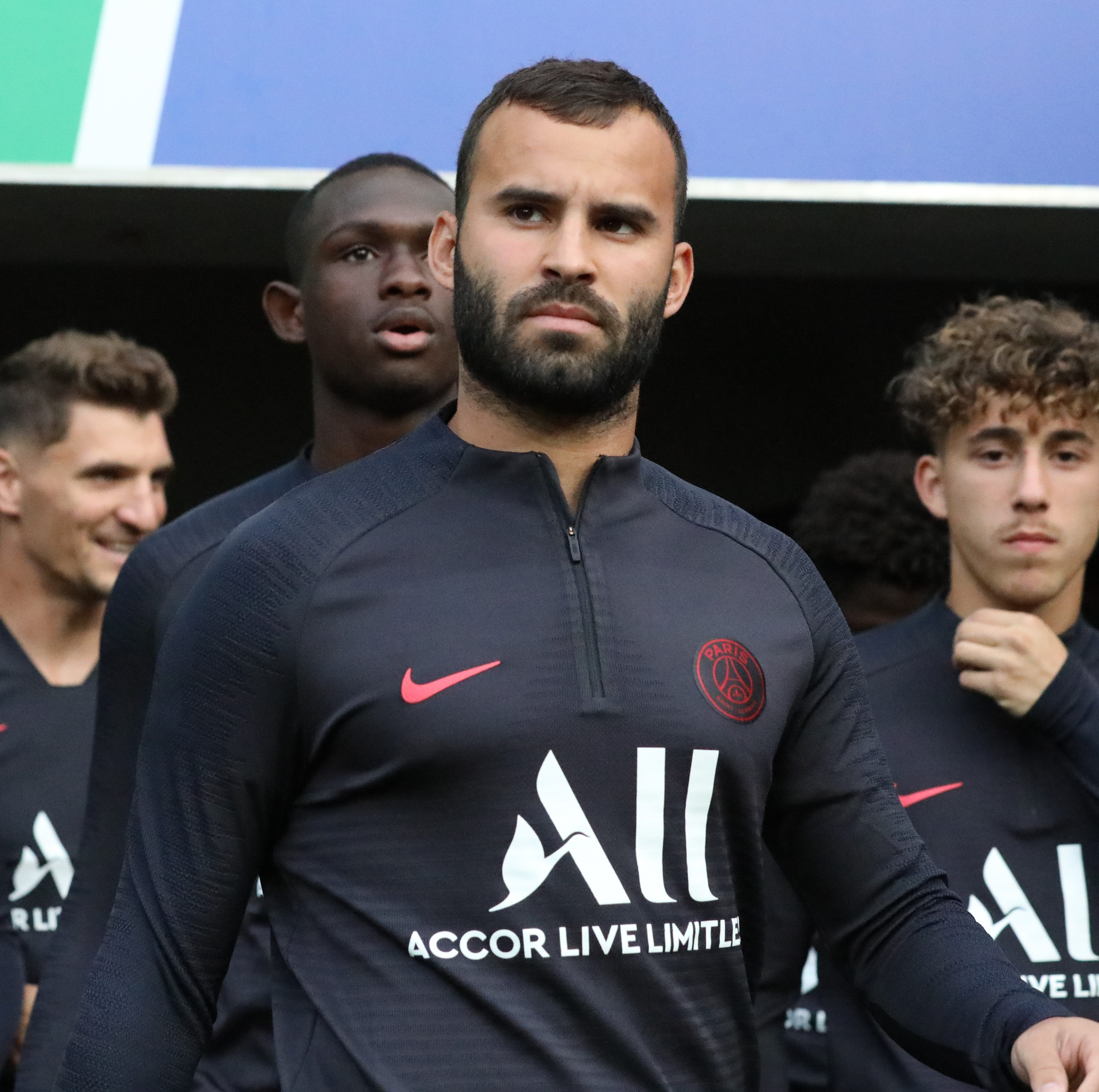
- Jesé with Paris Saint-Germain in 2019

Personal information
- Full name: Jesé Rodríguez Ruiz
- Date of birth: 26 February 1993 (age 33)
- Place of birth: Las Palmas, Spain
- Height: 1.78 m (5 ft 10 in)
- Positions: Winger; forward

Team information
- Current team: Las Palmas
- Number: 10

Youth career
- 2003–2005: El Pilar
- 2005–2007: Huracán
- 2007–2011: Real Madrid

Senior career*
Years	Team	Apps	(Gls)
2011–2013	Real Madrid B	77	(31)
2011–2016	Real Madrid	63	(13)
2016–2020	Paris Saint-Germain	12	(1)
2017	→ Las Palmas (loan)	16	(3)
2017–2018	→ Stoke City (loan)	13	(1)
2019	→ Real Betis (loan)	14	(2)
2019–2020	→ Sporting CP (loan)	12	(1)
2021–2022	Las Palmas	57	(13)
2022–2023	Ankaragücü	14	(2)
2023	Sampdoria	11	(1)
2023	Coritiba	6	(1)
2024–2025	Johor Darul Ta'zim	7	(2)
2025–	Las Palmas	33	(10)

International career
2009	Spain U16	3	(1)
2010	Spain U17	7	(1)
2011	Spain U18	2	(1)
2010–2012	Spain U19	11	(6)
2013	Spain U20	8	(5)
2013–2014	Spain U21	5	(2)
Medal record
Men's Football
Representing Spain
European Under-19 Championship
Winner	2012 Estonia
European Under-17 Championship
Runner-up	2010 Liechtenstein
- * Club domestic league appearances and goals as of 3 June 2026

Jesé Rodríguez Ruiz (Spanish pronunciation: [xeˈse roˈðɾiɣeθ ˈrwiθ]; born 26 February 1993) is a Spanish professional footballer who plays as winger or forward for Segunda División club Las Palmas.

An academy graduate of La Liga side Real Madrid, Jesé debuted for the senior team in 2011, making 94 appearances across all competitions for the club and scoring eighteen goals. During his time in Madrid, which was disrupted by a serious knee injury in 2014, he won two Champions League medals, as well as a title in each of La Liga, the FIFA Club World Cup and the Copa del Rey.

Jesé left the club in 2016 to join Ligue 1 side Paris Saint-Germain for a reported fee of €25 million, before returning to Spain six months later to join hometown club Las Palmas on loan for the remainder of the season. Jesé then joined Premier League side Stoke City on loan for the 2017–18 season, and later Real Betis for the second half of the 2018–19 La Liga campaign. After a brief loan spell with Primeira Liga club Sporting CP, Jesé left PSG to rejoin Las Palmas on a permanent deal.

On the international stage, Jesé earned 36 caps at youth level for Spain from under-16 to under-21 level, scoring sixteen goals overall. He was part of the Spain U19 side which won the 2012 UEFA European Under-19 Championship and claimed the Golden Boot award for ending as the tournament's top goalscorer.

Jesé is also a musician and goes by the stage name Jey M. He was previously part of a two-man reggaeton band which was formed in March 2014 and disbanded later that year.

== Club career ==
=== Real Madrid ===
==== Early career ====
Born in Las Palmas, Canary Islands, Jesé began his football career with local team Huracán in 2005, whom he joined from amateur side El Pilar. His form at youth level for the club saw him attract interest from La Liga sides Espanyol, Mallorca and Barcelona, but he opted to sign for Real Madrid's youth system in 2007, aged 14. Jesé made his senior debut for the Real Madrid Castilla side on 16 January 2011 in a 5–0 Segunda División B home win over Universidad de Las Palmas. His performance throughout the match, which included an assist for Dani Carvajal, drew early comparisons to fellow Real Madrid teammate and multiple Ballon d'Or winner, Cristiano Ronaldo. Jesé spent most of the season with Real Madrid's Juvenil A team, however, and enjoyed a successful 2010–11 campaign which earned him a permanent promotion to the Castilla side.

==== 2011–13: Youth and entrance to the first team squad ====
In July 2011, Jesé was selected by first-team manager José Mourinho for the club's pre-season tour of the United States and made his non-competitive debut for Real Madrid in a friendly against Los Angeles Galaxy, coming on as a 64th minute substitute for José Callejón and scoring in a 5–1 win. He returned to the Castilla for the start of the season and scored his first goal on 2 October 2011 against La Roda, finishing an assist from Álvaro Morata in a 4–2 away loss. Having impressed with the reserve side during the first half of the season, Jesé was handed his senior debut on 12 December in the first round of the Copa del Rey, replacing Ronaldo for the final fifteen minutes of a 2–0 away triumph over SD Ponferradina. After the match Jesé dedicated his debut to his family who had supported him in fulfilling his dream. He made his first La Liga appearance on 24 March 2012, once again replacing Ronaldo for the last ten minutes of a 5–1 home win over Real Sociedad. Aside from his two senior appearances, Jesé made 39 appearances and scored 10 goals for Castilla as the club was crowned Segunda División B champions. The senior side were also crowned champions of La Liga, having claimed the title with two games to spare in early May.

The following season, after criticism that players from the Castilla were not being given a fair chance, Mourinho stated that it was difficult to do so as the senior side played a different style to the reserves. He also highlighted the position Jesé was being played in as one that did not exist in the main squad. Jesé's lack of opportunity prompted agent Ginés Carvajal to publicly state that they would need to study options for the player's future if he was not permanently promoted to the first team the following year with the guarantee he would receive more playing time. In February 2013, in an interview with Marca, Jesé spoke out against his lack of senior game, stating that he was confident he was doing well enough to be granted an opportunity and, while he tried to learn as much as he could from Mourinho, he was a manager who surrounded himself with players who had already made their name. Club chairman Florentino Pérez and B-side coach Alberto Toril both defended Jesé for his comments, although the latter advised that he should learn to control his emotions.

In spite of his struggles in breaking into the first-team, Jesé continued to excel for the Castilla and on 2 June he broke the record for most goals scored in a single season for the reserve side, netting a solo goal in a 4–0 home win over AD Alcorcón to surpass the record of 21 goals set by Emilio Butragueño in 1983–84. Jesé's success drew praise from Pérez who described him as the jewel in the crown of Los Blancos' academy. He ended the season with 22 goals to his name in 38 appearances, earning the Zarra Trophy for the top Spanish goalscorer in the league, and on 18 June reiterated his desire to stay at Real Madrid in order to fight for a place in the first team.

==== 2013–16: Rising influence, injury and decline ====
While at the 2013 FIFA U-20 World Cup with Spain, Jesé was the subject of mass media speculation that he could be leaving Real Madrid following his lack of game-time with the first team the season before. The club's technical director, Miguel Pardeza, categorically stated on 13 July that the player would remain at the club, however, and Jesé extended his contract for a further four years later in the same month, signing a deal worth more than €1 million a year and which contained a €200 million release clause.

Jesé was handed his Champions League debut on 2 October 2013 by new club manager Carlo Ancelotti, coming on as an 81st-minute substitute for Karim Benzema in a 4–0 group stage victory over Copenhagen. He scored his first competitive goal for Real Madrid in his first El Clásico appearance on 26 October, netting in injury-time from a Ronaldo assist in a 2–1 loss at Barcelona. On 23 November, Jesé came on as a second-half substitute against UD Almería and contributed with his first two assists for the first team in a 5–0 away win. He enjoyed a fine run of form between the back end of 2013 and March 2014, where he netted a late winner at Valencia, scored his first Copa del Rey goal in a 2–0 win over CA Osasuna and netted in league encounters against Athletic Bilbao, Villarreal and Getafe. On 18 March, however, just two minutes into Real Madrid's Champions League's round-of-16 second leg game against Schalke, Jesé suffered a complete tear of the anterior cruciate ligament in his right knee following a challenge from Sead Kolašinac and was sidelined for the remainder of the season. He ended the season with 5 goals and 4 assists to his name in 18 league appearances, and 8 goals in 31 matches across all competitions as Real Madrid went on to lift the Copa Del Rey and Champions League trophies.

After spending nine months on the sidelines, Jesé returned from injury for the second leg of Real Madrid's tie against UE Cornellà in the Copa del Rey round of 32 on 2 December 2014, replacing Sami Khedira after 57 minutes and scoring the last goal of a 9–1 aggregate victory. On his injury, Jesé stated: "I had a very tough time, but I think that things in life happen for a reason. Maybe I had the injury because I needed to learn and become a more mature footballer." Later that month he was included in the club's squad which won the 2014 FIFA Club World Cup in Japan, making a substitute appearance in a 4–0 win over Cruz Azul in the semi-finals. He scored the first of his three La Liga goals for the season on 4 February 2015 in a 2–1 victory over Sevilla. Jesé struggled to break back into the first team following his injury though, starting only 3 of his 23 appearances for the season, and by the end of the campaign it was reported that he had grown frustrated at the club and was looking to leave in the summer.

Jesé opted to remain in Madrid for the 2015–16 season as he sought to break into the first team under new club manager Rafa Benítez. However, he found competition for places tough and was limited to just 1252 minutes of football across all competitions under Benítez and his successor, Zinedine Zidane. In spite of his lack of game time, Jesé still managed to contribute 6 goals and 8 assists for the season and was regularly used as a back-up in the team's triumphant 2015–16 UEFA Champions League campaign.

It would ultimately be Jesé's final season at the club as at the end of the season, with one year remaining on his contract, he agreed to sign for reigning Ligue 1 champions Paris Saint-Germain. He made 63 La Liga appearances for Real Madrid during his ten-year stay at the Santiago Bernabeu, of which 49 were substitute appearances, and scored 13 goals. In total, across all competitions, Jesé amassed 96 appearances and 18 goals for the club, departing with two Champions League titles and one apiece in La Liga, the Copa Del Rey and the Club World Cup to his name.

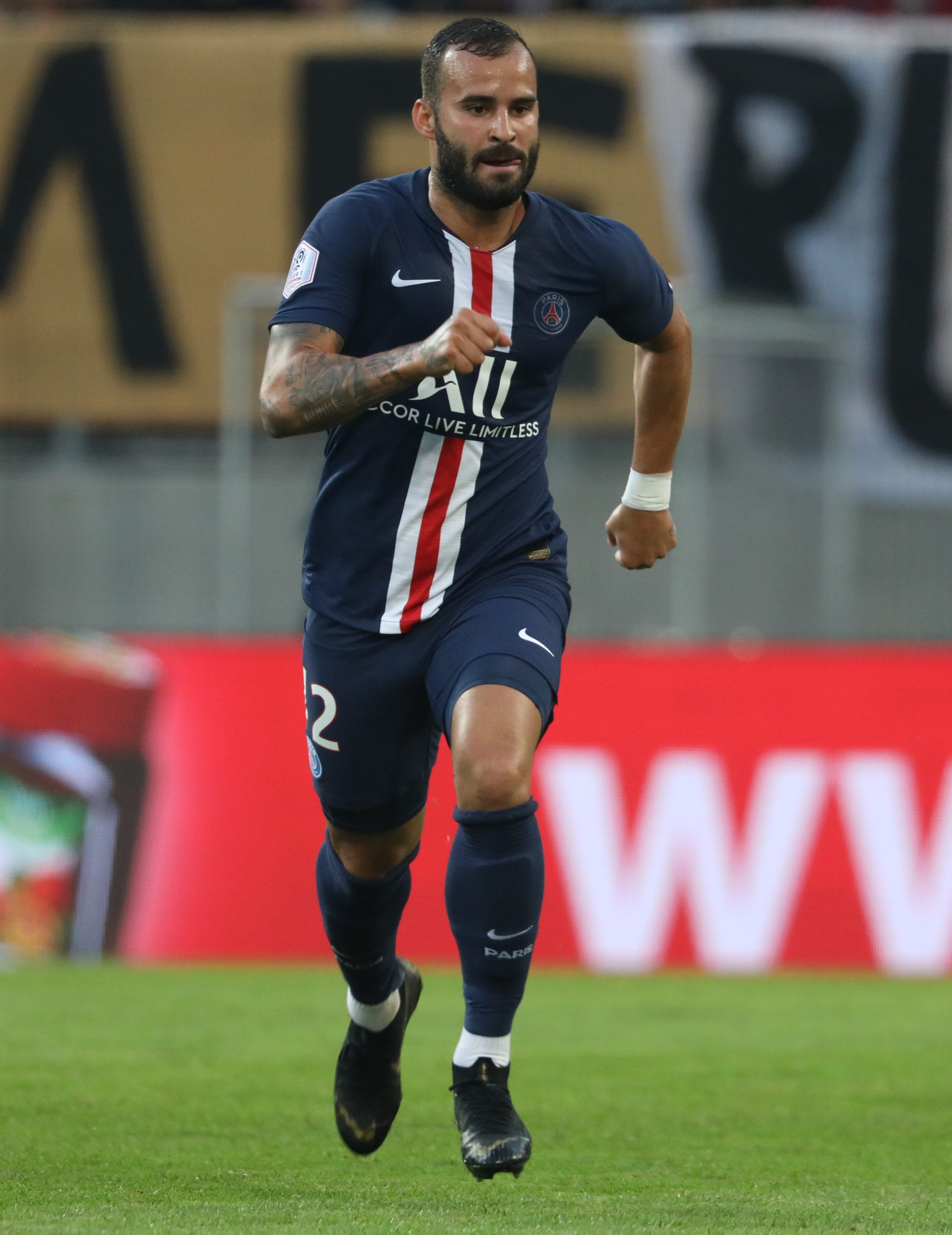
Jesé playing for Paris Saint-Germain in 2019

=== Paris Saint-Germain ===
On 8 August 2016, Jesé joined French side Paris Saint-Germain on a five-year deal for a reported transfer fee of €25 million. The deal included an 'anti-Barcelona' clause which prevented PSG from selling Jesé to Real Madrid's fierce La Liga rivals Barcelona in the future. He made his debut on 13 August, coming on as a substitute for Hatem Ben Arfa in a 1–0 away win over Bastia. Jesé was ruled out for a short period soon thereafter as a result of him suffering from appendicitis. Following his return, he scored his first goal for the club on 19 November, netting from the penalty-spot in a 2–0 win over Nantes. He made his Coupe de la Ligue debut on 14 December and scored the third goal in a 3–1 win over Lille.

Jesé struggled to settle in Paris, however, and by the end of the year he had only started in one of his nine league appearances for the club. His lack of form and infrequent game time, which totaled 358 minutes, prompted manager Unai Emery to suggest that he would be leaving the club during the January transfer window in order to rediscover his form.

==== 2017: Loan to Las Palmas ====
On 31 January 2017, Jesé signed for Las Palmas on loan until the end of the season. Club chairman Miguel Ángel Ramírez revealed that he had taken a massive pay cut in order to join his hometown club. The next day, he was presented in front of 9,000 fans at the Estadio de Gran Canaria, and pledged to do all he could to help the club qualify for European football. He debuted for the club on 6 February, coming on as a second-half substitute for Vicente Gómez in a 1–0 loss away to Granada, and made his first start the following week in a loss to Sevilla by the same scoreline.

On 1 March, Jesé returned to the Santiago Bernabéu for the first time ahead of Las Palmas' La Liga encounter with Real Madrid. During the build-up to the match, he revealed that he owed a debt to Real Madrid for welcoming him at the club and blamed the cruciate ligament injury he suffered as the reason for him not becoming a star with them. He also defended his previous criticism of former manager José Mourinho, stating that he has no regrets over his actions. Jesé started in the match between the two sides which ultimately ended in a 3–3 draw. He scored his first goals for the club four days later, netting a brace in a 5–2 league win over Osasuna. The result was Jesé's first win with Las Palmas, after the club failed to record a victory in its previous five matches following his arrival. He ultimately made 16 appearances for the campaign, scoring three goals and registering an assist as the side dropped to end the season in fourteenth position. Upon the conclusion of Jesé's loan agreement, Las Palmas elected not to attempt to sign him permanently, with his poor overall performance, high salary demands and off-field behaviour ultimately contributing to the club's decision.

==== 2017–18: Loan to Stoke City ====
On 16 August 2017, Jesé joined Premier League club Stoke City on loan for the 2017–18 season. Despite having only trained once with the team following his arrival, he made his debut on 19 August and scored the only goal in a 1–0 win over Arsenal. In December 2017, Jesé left the stadium early during Stoke's match against Swansea City after manager Mark Hughes made all of his substitutes and left him on the bench. He was subsequently disciplined by the club. In unrelated circumstances, he missed the next match against Tottenham Hotspur and a number of subsequent matches as he had been granted compassionate leave to visit his prematurely born son in the Canary Islands.

He made his return on 10 February 2018 in Stoke's 1–1 draw with Brighton and in the final minutes of the match won a penalty after being fouled by Dale Stephens. Teammate, and regular Stoke penalty-taker, Charlie Adam denied a visibly angered Jesé the opportunity the take the penalty but saw his effort saved by Brighton goalkeeper Mathew Ryan. New club manager Paul Lambert later denied that there was any rift between the players following the match. The following month, Jesé was again afforded compassionate leave after his son underwent a second operation. However, he failed to return to training thereafter which sparked speculation that Stoke would look to terminate his loan contract. His loan spell ended on 1 May when the club confirmed that he had been given unpaid compassionate leave until the end of the season. He scored one goal in 13 appearances during his time with Stoke and the club ultimately suffered relegation from the Premier League.

==== 2018–19: Return to PSG and loan to Betis ====
Upon his return to PSG, Jesé indicated his eagerness to fight for a spot in the team but he and teammate Gonçalo Guedes were later excluded from new manager Thomas Tuchel's pre-season tour of Asia. He continued to be excluded as the season commenced and was also made to train alone by Tuchel alongside Jean-Christophe Bahebeck. At the turn of the year, with Jesé having not played a single match for the season, it was revealed that he had lost 7 kg after appointing a personal trainer as he looked to reintegrate himself into the team. He then made his first, and only appearance for the club for the season on 23 January 2019, coming on as a last minute substitute in a Coupe de France win over Strasbourg.

On 29 January, Jesé signed for Betis on loan until the end of the season where he reunited with former Las Palmas manager, Quique Setién. He made his debut for the club on 7 February, coming on as a second-half substitute in a 2–2 Copa del Rey draw with Valencia. The following week, he made his Europa League debut as a second-half substitute and assisted Diego Lainez for an injury-time equalizer in a 3–3 draw with Rennes. His first goal followed on 10 March, when he scored the only goal in a 1–0 league win over Celta Vigo. He ultimately scored twice in eighteen appearances but Betis elected not to sign him permanently at the end of the season.

==== 2019–20: Loan to Sporting CP ====
On 2 September 2019, Jesé joined Portuguese club Sporting CP on loan for the 2019–20 season. He scored his first goal for the club towards the end of the following month, opening the scoring in a 3–1 win over Vitória de Guimarães.

At the end of the 2019–20 season, Jesé received a Ligue 1 medal for his contributions at PSG, where he played one minute the whole season in an away match against Metz.

==== 2020–21: Contract termination ====
Jesé did not complete a permanent transfer to Sporting CP after the end of his loan deal; instead, he headed back to PSG. On 10 September 2020, Jesé made his return to play for the Parisian club in a 1–0 loss to Lens. He made his final appearance for PSG as a substitute in a 4–0 win against Nîmes on 16 October.

On 6 December, Paris Saint-Germain announced the termination of his contract by mutual agreement.

=== Second stint at Las Palmas ===
On 1 February 2021, Jesé returned to Las Palmas for the remainder of the season. He put up a 'man of the match' performance where he scored a goal and also assisted in the 6–1 victory over Lugo on 1 April.

=== Ankaragücü ===
Jesé joined Turkish Süper Lig club Ankaragücü on 4 August 2022, signing a one-year deal with the club. He made his competitive debut four days later, coming on as a substitute for Giorgi Beridze in the 61st minute of a 0–0 home draw against Konyaspor. On 8 November, Jesé scored a brace during the 2022–23 Turkish Cup in a 6–2 win over Amed Sportif. However, his contract was terminated early by mutual consent on 13 January 2023.

=== Sampdoria ===
On 10 February 2023, Jesé joined Serie A club Sampdoria on a contract until the end of the season, with the option of a further year. He scored his first goal for the Italian side on 16 April, in a 1–1 league draw against Lecce.

=== Coritiba ===
On 6 September 2023, Jesé joined Campeonato Brasileiro Série A club Coritiba on a free transfer, signing a contract until the end of the year. He scored his first goal for the club in a 2–1 lost against Fluminense on 26 November.

=== Johor Darul Ta'zim ===
After 10 months without a club, Jesé joined Malaysia Super League club Johor Darul Ta'zim on 5 October 2024. He make his club debut on 22 October in the 2024–25 AFC Champions League Elite against Korean club Gwangju. Jesé then made his league debut on 1 November in a 4–0 away win against Negeri Sembilan. On 30 November, he scored his first goal for the club during the 2024–25 Malaysia Cup round of 16 tie against Kuala Lumpur Rovers. On 5 February 2025, he scored his first league goal by scoring the third goal in a 4–0 home win against PDRM. On 18 February, Jesé then scored his first AFC Champions League Elite goal in the stoppage time against Korean club Pohang Steelers which his club went on to win 5–2 thus qualifying to the round of 16. He then won the league title and the league cup in his first season with JDT.

=== Third stint at Las Palmas ===
On 24 July 2025, Jesé returned to Las Palmas on a one-year contract. On 25 June of the following year, after being regularly used, he renewed his link until 2028.

== International career ==
=== Spain national youth teams ===
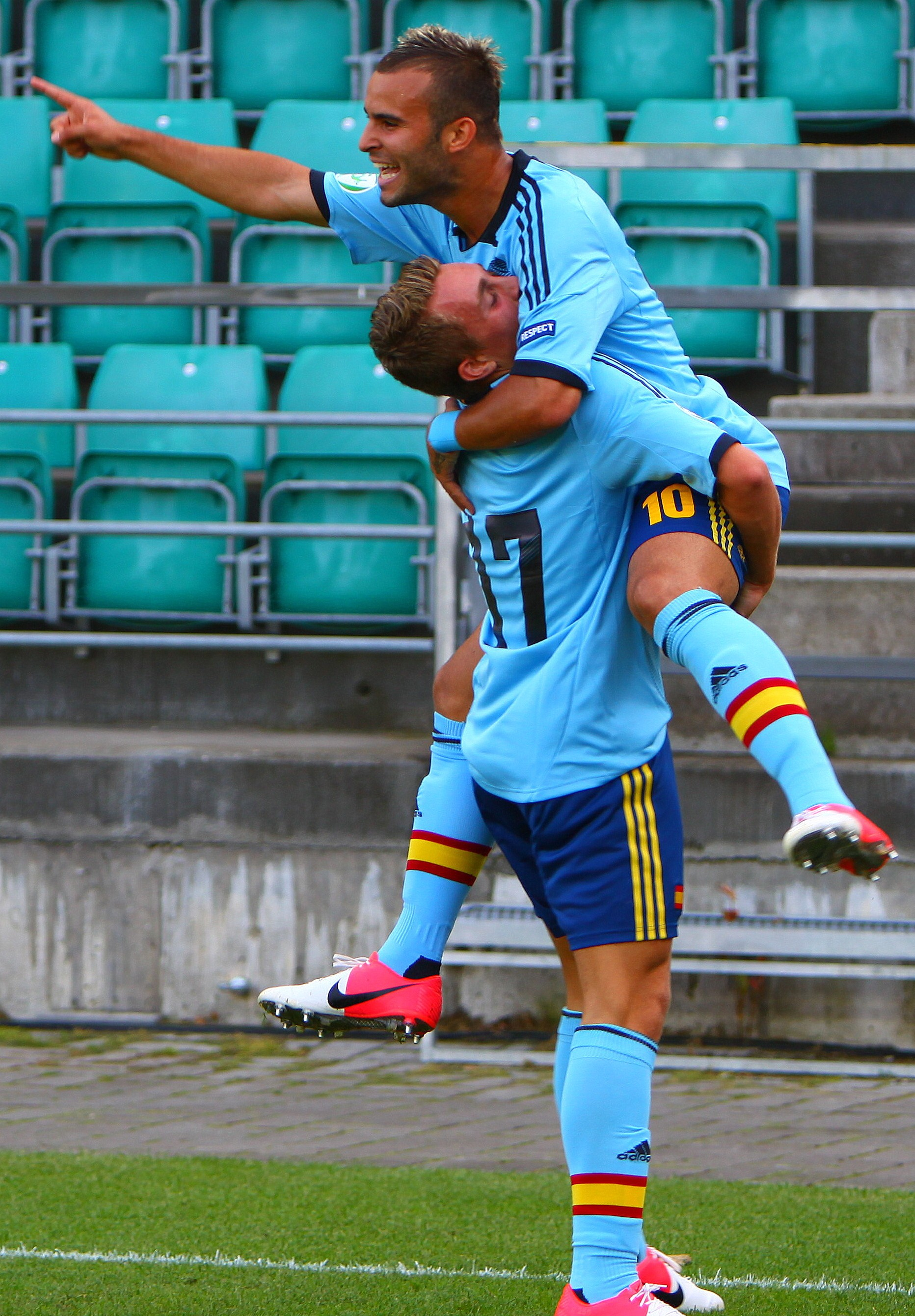
Jesé with Gerard Deulofeu at the European Under-19 Championship in 2012.

Jesé is a former Spanish youth international, having represented the nation at all levels from the under-16s to the under-21s between 2009 and 2014.

In 2010, he traveled to Liechtenstein with the Spain under-17 side for the 2010 UEFA European Football Championship in which Spain ended as runners-up to England. Jesé scored one goal at the tournament, netting the opener in Spain's 3–1 semi-final win over Turkey. Two years later, Jesé netted five goals during Spain's victorious 2012 European Under-19 Championship campaign in Estonia, including a hat trick against Portugal and the winning goal against Greece in the final. Jesé also received the Golden Boot award for ending as the competition's top goalscorer. The following year, Jesé scored a further five goals and assisted another for the Spain under-20 team at the 2013 FIFA U-20 World Cup in Turkey. Spain were ultimately eliminated at hands of Uruguay in the quarter-finals but the nation's early exit from the competition did not prevent Jesé from earning the Bronze Boot award for ending as the tournament's third top goalscorer. His form at the tournament drew praise from Spanish journalist Guillem Balagué who claimed he was better than Real Madrid's new world-record signing Gareth Bale was at the same age.

On 6 February 2014, although he was still eligible to play for the under-21s, Spain manager Vicente del Bosque revealed that Jesé was in his plans ahead of the 2014 FIFA World Cup in Brazil. However, his chances of taking part at the tournament were ended in March when he ruptured his anterior cruciate ligament while playing for Real Madrid, with Del Bosque describing the situation as "a blow". Due to his eight-month spell on the sidelines, Jesé also missed Spain's qualification play-off against Serbia for the 2015 European U-21 Championship. Spain ultimately lost the match 2–1 and thereby also failed to qualify for the 2016 Summer Olympics.

== Style of play ==
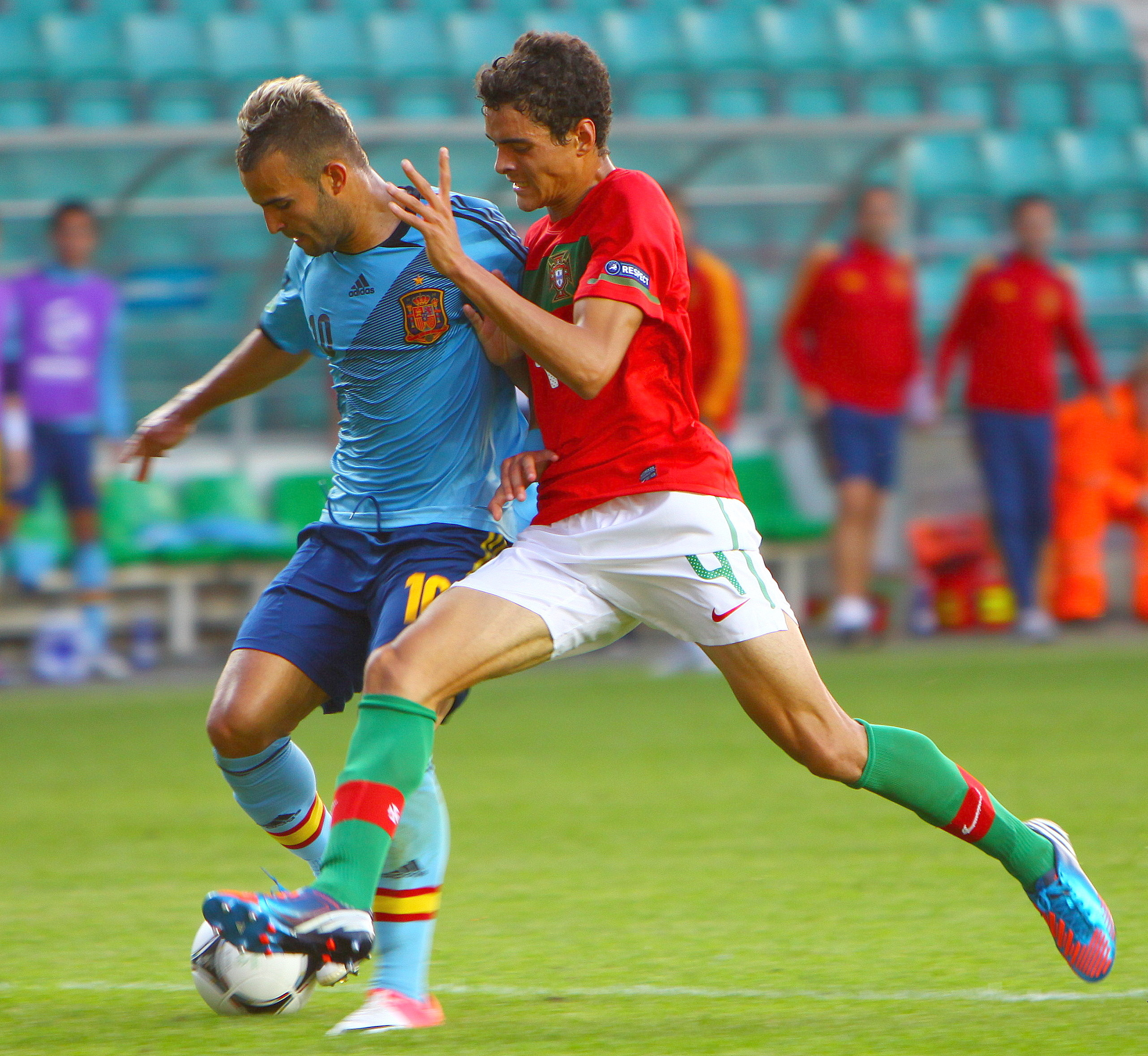
Jesé guarding the ball from Tiago Ilori. His ability to retain possession has led to comparisons with Cristiano Ronaldo.

Jesé is able to play across the front line, operating either as an attacking midfielder, second striker or centre-forward, or in his favoured position out on the wing. During his time at the Castilla, Jesé was often deployed in a false 9 role in the team's 4–3–3 formation, and regularly switched flanks due to his ability to use both feet. In 2013, in his role as the club's sporting director at the time, Zinedine Zidane declared himself an admirer of Jesé's direct style of football and goal scoring ability. Following Jesé's promotion to Real Madrid's first team in 2013, manager Carlo Ancelotti played him in a winger position, where he could cut inside from the wing both with the ball and without, to create chances and score goals. His progression with Real Madrid's senior side often saw him compared to teammate Cristiano Ronaldo due to the similarities in their style as well as Jesé's technical ability, close control, pace and dribbling abilities. Jesé welcomed the comparison to Ronaldo and in a 2013 interview with Marca named the Portuguese as his favourite player, ahead of Brazilian namesake, Ronaldo, and Ronaldinho.

== Personal life ==
Jesé was born to Pascual Rodríguez, a pharmacy worker, and María Ruiz. When he joined Real Madrid at the age of 14, he made a promise to his father that he would help him retire by pursuing a career in football. The day after he signed his first professional contract with Real Madrid, Jesé's father was able to retire from the pharmacy at which he worked. He has the names of his parents tattooed on the back of his hands and in 2014 bought them a house in Gran Canaria.

Jesé has four sons, Jesé Jr. (born 2012), Neizan (born 2016), Nyan (born 2017), Kenai (born 2019) and one daughter, Aylén (2020). He learned of the birth of his second son over social media platform Instagram after the mother of the child claimed that he was the father in a post in November 2016. A DNA test was conducted soon after which confirmed Jesé to be the father. Jesé's third son, Nyan was born prematurely in 2017 and suffered from a number of medical conditions from birth. The following year, he went through a public and acrimonious breakup with Nyan's mother, Aurah Ruiz, which culminated in Ruiz taking Jesé to court where she accused him of neglecting his duties as a father. He responded with a counter-suit against Ruiz for slander in which he allegedly asked that she pay "one Euro and be sentenced to three to five years in prison."

In 2014, just a week after suffering a cruciate ligament injury with Real Madrid, Jesé had to be rescued when a suspected gas explosion set fire to the luxury apartment block in which he was staying at the time.

Aside from football, Jesé is also a musician and formed a Spanish reggaeton band called Big Flow with close friend DJ Nuno in March 2014. Together, the pair released two singles on YouTube, the first of which was titled La Mano Arriba. In November the same year, the group disbanded with Jesé announcing he would be pursuing a solo career in 2015 under the name 'Jey M.' In 2018, he released a single titled La Prueba – The Proof - from which he sought to donate proceeds for research towards diseases such congenital hyperinsulinism.

In December 2020, Jesé ended his contract early with Paris Saint-Germain. He had reportedly broken COVID-19 regulations while being on a trip to the Canary Islands, and was involved in a sex scandal having supposedly cheated on his partner with her friend Rocio Amar earlier in the year. Both events contributed to PSG terminating his contract.

== Career statistics ==
As of match played 8 March 2026

Appearances and goals by club, season and competition
Club	Season	League			National Cup (Note: Includes Copa del Rey, Coupe de France, FA Cup, Taça de Portugal, Turkish Cup, Malaysia Cup)		League Cup (Note: Includes Coupe de la Ligue, EFL Cup, Taça da Liga)		Continental		Other		Total	
Club	Season	Division	Apps	Goals	Apps	Goals	Apps	Goals	Apps	Goals	Apps	Goals	Apps	Goals
Real Madrid Castilla	2010–11	Segunda División B	3	0	—		—		—		—		3	0
Real Madrid Castilla	2011–12	Segunda División B	36	9	—		—		—		3	2	39	11
Real Madrid Castilla	2012–13	Segunda División	38	22	—		—		—		—		38	22
Real Madrid Castilla	Total		77	31	—		—		—		3 (Note: Appearances in promotion play-offs)	2	80	33
Real Madrid	2011–12	La Liga	1	0	1	0	—		0	0	0	0	2	0
Real Madrid	2013–14	La Liga	18	5	8	3	—		5 (Note: Appearance(s) in UEFA Champions League)	0	0	0	31	8
Real Madrid	2014–15	La Liga	16	3	3	1	—		3	0	1 (Note: Appearance(s) in FIFA Club World Cup)	0	23	4
Real Madrid	2015–16	La Liga	28	5	1	0	—		9	1	—		38	6
Real Madrid	Total		63	13	13	4	—		17	1	1	0	94	18
Paris Saint-Germain	2016–17	Ligue 1	9	1	0	0	1	1	4	0	0	0	14	2
Paris Saint-Germain	2018–19	Ligue 1	0	0	1	0	0	0	0	0	0	0	1	0
Paris Saint-Germain	2019–20	Ligue 1	1	0	0	0	0	0	0	0	0	0	1	0
Paris Saint-Germain	2020–21	Ligue 1	2	0	0	0	—		0	0	0	0	2	0
Paris Saint-Germain	Total		12	1	1	0	1	1	4	0	0	0	18	2
Las Palmas (loan)	2016–17	La Liga	16	3	0	0	—		—		—		16	3
Stoke City (loan)	2017–18	Premier League	13	1	0	0	0	0	—		—		13	1
Real Betis (loan)	2018–19	La Liga	14	2	2	0	—		2 (Note: Appearance(s) in UEFA Europa League)	0	0	0	18	2
Sporting CP (loan)	2019–20	Primeira Liga	12	1	1	0	2	0	2	0	0	0	17	1
Las Palmas	2020–21	Segunda División	16	2	0	0	—		—		0	0	16	2
Las Palmas	2021–22	Segunda División	41	11	0	0	—		—		0	0	41	11
Las Palmas	Total		57	13	0	0	—		—		0	0	57	13
Ankaragücü	2022–23	Süper Lig	14	2	2	3	—		—		—		16	5
Sampdoria	2022–23	Serie A	11	1	—		—		—		—		11	1
Coritiba	2023	Série A	6	1	—		—		—		—		6	1
Johor Darul Ta'zim	2024–25	Malaysia Super League	7	2	3	1	—		3 (Note: Appearances in AFC Champions League Elite)	1	—		13	4
Las Palmas	2025–26	Segunda División	20	6	0	0	—		—		—		20	6
Career total			322	77	22	8	3	1	24	2	1	0	378	88

== Honours ==
Real Madrid

- La Liga: 2011–12
- Copa del Rey: 2013–14
- UEFA Champions League: 2013–14, 2015–16
- FIFA Club World Cup: 2014

Real Madrid Castilla

- Segunda División B: 2011–12

Paris Saint-Germain

- Ligue 1: 2019–20
- Coupe de la Ligue: 2016–17
- Coupe de France runner-up: 2018–19

Johor Darul Ta'zim

- Malaysia Super League: 2024–25
- Malaysia Cup: 2024–25

Spain U19

- UEFA European Under-19 Championship: 2012

Spain U17

- UEFA European Under-17 Championship: Runner-up 2010

Individual

- UEFA European Under-17 Championship Team of the Tournament: 2010
- UEFA European Under-19 Championship: Golden Boot 2012
- UEFA European Under-19 Championship: 2012
- Segunda División: Zarra Trophy 2013
- FIFA U-20 World Cup: Bronze Boot 2013
