= AD Huracán =

Spanish football team

Huracán
- Full name: Asociación Deportiva Huracán
- Founded: 1980
- Ground: Pepe Gonçalvez, Las Palmas, Canary Islands, Spain
- Capacity: 3,000
- Chairman: (Spain) Carlos Nadur
- Manager: (Spain) Diego Cocca
Home colours	Away colours

Asociación Deportiva Huracán is a Spanish football team based in Las Palmas, in the Canary Islands. Founded in 1980, it is focused mainly on youth football, holding home games at Estadio Pepe Gonçalvez, with a capacity of 3,000 seats.

== History ==
Huracán first reached the fourth division of Spanish football in 2002–03, being immediately relegated back. In late June 2011, before the start of what would be its eighth season in the category, the club gave up its berth, citing poor finances as the main reason; it subsequently returned to the regional championships, before closing their senior team in 2018.

Notable Huracán youth products include former Real Madrid winger Jesé and current Villarreal CF forward Yeremy Pino.

== Season to season ==
Season	Tier	Division	Place	Copa del Rey
1988–89	7	2ª Reg.	11th	
1989–90	7	2ª Reg.	1st	
1990–91	6	1ª Reg.	4th	
1991–1999	DNP			
1999–2000	7	2ª Reg.	1st	
2000–01	6	1ª Reg.	1st	
2001–02	5	Int. Pref.	1st	
2002–03	4	3ª	20th	
2003–04	5	Int. Pref.	1st	
2004–05	4	3ª	12th	
2005–06	4	3ª	16th	
2006–07	4	3ª	18th	

Season	Tier	Division	Place	Copa del Rey
2007–08	5	Int. Pref.	1st	
2008–09	4	3ª	17th	
2009–10	4	3ª	9th	
2010–11	4	3ª	14th	
2011–12	5	Int. Pref.	14th	
2012–13	5	Int. Pref.	17th	
2013–14	6	1ª Afic.	2nd	
2014–15	5	Int. Pref.	16th	
2015–16	6	1ª Afic.	5th	
2016–17	6	1ª Afic.	4th	
2017–18	6	1ª Afic.	3rd	

- 7 seasons in Tercera División
