= Vicente Gómez (footballer, born 1988) =

Spanish footballer

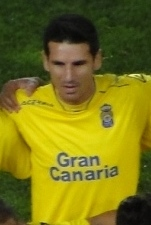
- Gómez with Las Palmas in 2015

Personal information
- Full name: José Vicente Gómez Umpiérrez
- Date of birth: 31 August 1988 (age 38)
- Place of birth: Las Palmas, Spain
- Height: 1.87 m (6 ft 2 in)
- Position: Defensive midfielder

Youth career
- Huracán

Senior career*
Years	Team	Apps	(Gls)
2007–2009	Huracán		
2009–2010	Las Palmas B	28	(1)
2010–2018	Las Palmas	223	(13)
2018–2020	Deportivo La Coruña	59	(0)
2020–2021	Kerala Blasters	19	(2)
2021–2022	Xanthi	28	(4)
Total		357	(20)
- * Club domestic league appearances and goals

José Vicente Gómez Umpiérrez (born 31 August 1988) is a Spanish former professional footballer who played as a defensive midfielder.

== Club career ==
=== Las Palmas ===
Born in Las Palmas, Canary Islands, Gómez made his debut as a senior with AD Huracán in 2007. In the summer of 2009, he moved to UD Las Palmas; initially assigned to the C team, he spent the entire season with the reserves in the Tercera División.

On 22 June 2010, Gómez was definitely promoted to the main squad. He made his professional debut on 1 September, starting and scoring his side's second goal in a 5–3 away loss against Real Valladolid in the second round of the Copa del Rey. He first appeared in the Segunda División three days later, coming on as a second-half substitute for David González in the 0–0 draw at SD Huesca.

On 24 September 2011, Gómez scored his first goals at that level, netting a brace in a 4–2 defeat at Girona FC – he was also sent off later in the same match. On 8 June 2012, he signed a new four-year contract running until 2016.

Gómez appeared in 31 games and scored three goals during the 2014–15 campaign, as the club returned to La Liga after 13 years. He made his debut in the Spanish top flight on 22 August 2015, replacing Hernán in a 1–0 away loss to Atlético Madrid. He scored his first goal the following 3 January, in a 2–2 draw against Athletic Bilbao at the San Mamés Stadium.

=== Deportivo ===
On 17 August 2018, Gómez signed a three-year contract with second-tier Deportivo de La Coruña. During his spell at the Estadio Riazor he made 60 appearances across all competitions, being relegated in 2020.

=== Kerala Blasters ===
On 23 September 2020, aged 32, Gómez joined Indian Super League club Kerala Blasters FC on a three-year deal. He scored his first goal on 6 December, in the last minute of the 3–1 home win over FC Goa.

Gómez left the Jawaharlal Nehru Stadium on 12 June 2021.

=== Later career ===
On 20 August 2021, Gómez agreed to a contract at Xanthi F.C. in the Super League Greece 2. After retiring, he returned to Las Palmas to work as a scout.

== Career statistics ==
Appearances and goals by club, season and competition
Club	Season	League			Cup		Other		Total	
Club	Season	Division	Apps	Goals	Apps	Goals	Apps	Goals	Apps	Goals
Las Palmas	2010–11	Segunda División	26	0	1	1	0	0	27	1
Las Palmas	2011–12	Segunda División	29	2	1	0	0	0	30	2
Las Palmas	2012–13	Segunda División	24	0	5	1	0	0	29	1
Las Palmas	2013–14	Segunda División	38	5	1	0	0	0	39	5
Las Palmas	2014–15	Segunda División	31	3	2	0	0	0	33	3
Las Palmas	2015–16	La Liga	21	1	5	0	0	0	26	1
Las Palmas	2016–17	La Liga	29	2	1	0	0	0	30	2
Las Palmas	2017–18	La Liga	25	0	3	0	0	0	28	0
Las Palmas	Las Palmas total		223	13	19	2	0	0	242	15
Deportivo	2018–19	Segunda División	34	0	0	0	0	0	34	0
Deportivo	2019–20	Segunda División	25	0	1	0	0	0	26	0
Deportivo	Deportivo total		59	0	1	0	0	0	60	0
Kerala Blasters	2020–21	Indian Super League	19	2	0	0	0	0	19	2
Xanthi	2021–22	Super League Greece 2	28	4	1	0	0	0	29	4
Career totals			329	19	21	2	0	0	350	21
