= Asdrúbal Padrón =

Spanish footballer (born 1991)

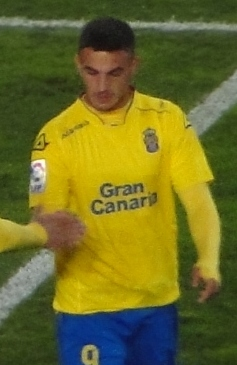
- Asdrúbal with Las Palmas in 2015

Personal information
- Full name: Félix Asdrúbal Padrón Hernández
- Date of birth: 13 March 1991 (age 35)
- Place of birth: Las Palmas, Spain
- Height: 1.75 m (5 ft 9 in)
- Positions: Winger; forward

Team information
- Current team: Arucas

Youth career
- Las Palmas

Senior career*
Years	Team	Apps	(Gls)
2010–2013	Las Palmas B	77	(26)
2013–2017	Las Palmas	55	(11)
2016	→ Leganés (loan)	8	(1)
2017	Port	0	(0)
2017–2018	Central Coast Mariners	11	(2)
2018–2019	Alcorcón	11	(1)
2019	→ Salamanca (loan)	16	(1)
2019–2023	Tamaraceite	101	(27)
2023–	Arucas	37	(9)
- * Club domestic league appearances and goals as of 12 October 2024

Félix Asdrúbal Padrón Hernández (born 13 March 1991), simply known as Asdrúbal, is a Spanish professional footballer who plays as either a winger or a forward for Arucas.

== Football career ==
Born in Las Palmas, Canary Islands, Asdrúbal finished his formation with UD Las Palmas, and made his senior debuts with the reserves in 2010–11 season.

On 3 July 2013 Asdrúbal renewed his link with the club, until 2015. On 31 August he made his debut as a professional, coming on as a second half substitute and scoring the last in 1–1 home draw against SD Eibar.

In August 2014, after appearing in 34 matches and scoring five goals in the 2013–14 campaign, Asdrúbal was definitely promoted to the main squad and was handed the number 9 jersey. On 15 July of the following year, after winning promotion to La Liga, he signed a new three-year deal with the club.

On 24 January 2016, after making no league appearances during the season, Asdrúbal was loaned to second level's CD Leganés until June. After another top level promotion he returned to his parent club, and was handed the number 25 jersey after a loan to Elche CF fell through.

Asdrúbal made his debut in the main category of Spanish football on 1 October 2016, replacing Aythami Artiles in a 2–2 away draw against CA Osasuna. The following 3 January he rescinded his contract, and joined Thai Premier League side Port F.C. the following day.

On 28 July 2017, Asdrúbal joined Australian club Central Coast Mariners FC on a one-year contract. He scored his first goal for the club on debut in the first round of the 2017–18 A-League season against rivals Newcastle Jets FC, but in a 1–5 loss; after 11 appearances, he was released.

On 20 January 2018, Asdrúbal signed a two-and-a-half-year contract with AD Alcorcón in the second division. Roughly one year later, he moved to third division side Salamanca CF on loan until June.

On 9 July 2019, after returning from loan, Asdrúbal terminated his contract with the Alfareros.
