= José Artiles =

Spanish footballer

Personal information
- Full name: José Manuel Artiles Romero
- Date of birth: 10 June 1993 (age 33)
- Place of birth: Sardina del Sur, Spain
- Height: 1.67 m (5 ft 5 1/2 in)
- Positions: Winger; forward

Team information
- Current team: Nea Salamina Famagusta FC
- Number: 8

Youth career
- Las Palmas

Senior career*
Years	Team	Apps	(Gls)
2011–2018	Las Palmas B	166	(30)
2011–2018	Las Palmas	8	(0)
2015–2016	→ Racing Santander (loan)	32	(3)
2017	→ Cartagena (loan)	12	(0)
2018–2019	Lleida Esportiu	17	(0)
2019	El Ejido	14	(1)
2019–2021	Don Benito	47	(3)
2021–2023	Mérida AD	46	(5)
2023–2025	Hércules	66	(4)
2025–	Nea Salamina Famagusta FC	29	(3)
- * Club domestic league appearances and goals as of 3 May 2026

José Manuel Artiles Romero (born 10 June 1993) is a Spanish professional footballer who plays for Cypriot Second Division club Nea Salamis Famagusta as a winger or forward.

== Football career ==
Born in Sardina del Sur, Province of Las Palmas, Canary Islands, Artiles finished his formation with UD Las Palmas, and made his senior debuts with the reserves in 2009–10 season, in the Tercera División.

On 25 September 2011 Artiles made his debut as a professional, playing the entire second half of a 0–1 home loss against Córdoba CF in the Segunda División. On 26 August 2015, after appearing mainly with the B-side, he was loaned to Racing de Santander of the Segunda División B for a year.

On 20 January 2017, Artiles was loaned to fellow third-tier club FC Cartagena, until June. On 9 August of the following year, after spending the previous campaign exclusively with Las Palmas' B-team, he signed a two-year contract with Lleida Esportiu in the third division.

In January 2023, Artiles signed for Hércules.
