= Leo Ramírez =

Spanish footballer

Personal information
- Full name: Leonardo del Cristo Ramírez Rodríguez
- Date of birth: 20 June 1992 (age 34)
- Place of birth: Las Palmas, Spain
- Height: 1.95 m (6 ft 5 in)
- Position: Midfielder

Team information
- Current team: Alzira

Youth career
- Las Palmas

Senior career*
Years	Team	Apps	(Gls)
2011–2013	Las Palmas C		
2013–2015	Las Palmas B	63	(6)
2013–2018	Las Palmas	3	(0)
2015–2016	→ Cacereño (loan)	34	(0)
2016–2017	→ Arandina (loan)	33	(2)
2017–2018	→ Llagostera (loan)	34	(6)
2018–2020	Cornellà	44	(11)
2020–2021	El Ejido	8	(1)
2021	Tarazona	17	(2)
2021–2022	Tamaraceite	27	(3)
2022–2023	Saguntino	15	(1)
2023–2024	Atzeneta	44	(5)
2024–2025	La Nucía	33	(3)
2025–	Alzira	9	(3)
- * Club domestic league appearances and goals as of 9 November 2025

Leonardo 'Leo' del Cristo Ramírez Rodríguez (born 20 June 1992) is a Spanish footballer who plays for Tercera Federación club Alzira as a midfielder.

== Football career ==
Born in Las Palmas, Canary Islands, Ramírez finished his graduation with UD Las Palmas' youth setup, and made senior debuts with the C-team in the 2011–12 campaign. In January 2013 he was promoted to the reserves in Tercera División.

On 11 September 2013 Ramírez played his first match as a professional, coming on as a second-half substitute in a 3–1 win at CE Sabadell FC, for the season's Copa del Rey. He made his league debut on 14 December, starting and playing the full 90 minutes in a 0–2 home loss against Real Madrid Castilla.

On 30 August 2015 Ramírez was loaned to Segunda División B side CP Cacereño, in a season-long deal. Roughly one year later, he moved to fellow league team Arandina CF also in a temporary deal.

On 15 July 2017, Ramírez moved to UE Llagostera also in the third division, on a one-year loan deal.
