= David Simón =

Spanish footballer

Personal information
- Full name: David Simón Rodríguez Santana
- Date of birth: 16 December 1988 (age 37)
- Place of birth: Las Palmas, Spain
- Height: 1.78 m (5 ft 10 in)
- Position: Right-back

Youth career
- Atlético Feria
- Unión Viera

Senior career*
Years	Team	Apps	(Gls)
2008–2010	Unión Viera	31	(0)
2010–2014	Las Palmas B	109	(11)
2011–2012	→ Vecindario (loan)	33	(2)
2014–2018	Las Palmas	95	(3)
2018–2020	Deportivo La Coruña	38	(1)
2020–2022	Cartagena	30	(0)
2022–2024	Lamia	70	(1)
2024–2026	A.E. Kifisia	49	(3)
- * Club domestic league appearances and goals as of 14 June 2026

David Simón Rodríguez Santana (born 16 December 1988), known as David Simón, is a Spanish professional footballer who plays as a right-back.

== Club career ==
=== Las Palmas ===
Born in Las Palmas, Canary Islands, David Simón started playing as a senior with local CF Unión Viera. In 2010, he moved to UD Las Palmas, being assigned to the reserves in the Tercera División.

In the summer of 2011, David Simón was loaned to Segunda División B's UD Vecindario. He featured regularly for the club, which was relegated to the fourth tier.

In June 2012, David Simón renewed his contract with Las Palmas until 2015, but remained with the reserves, however. In August 2014, he was definitely promoted to the main squad.

On 23 August 2014, David Simón played his first match as a professional by starting the 2–0 home win against UE Llagostera in the Segunda División. He scored his first goal in the competition on 21 March of the following year, but in a 4–2 away loss to CD Numancia.

David Simón was an undisputed starter during the campaign, appearing in 41 games and scoring twice as his team returned to La Liga after a 13-year absence. He made his debut in the competition on 22 August 2015, playing the full 90 minutes in a 1–0 defeat at Atlético Madrid.

=== Deportivo ===
On 24 July 2018, after suffering relegation, David Simón terminated his contract with Las Palmas, and signed a two-year deal with fellow second division side Deportivo de La Coruña the following day. He made only ten league appearances in 2019–20 due to a pubis injury, scoring once in an eventual relegation.

=== Cartagena ===
David Simón agreed to a one-year contract with FC Cartagena on 2 September 2020.
