= Dani Castellano =

Spanish footballer (born 1987)

Personal information
- Full name: Daniel Castellano Betancor
- Date of birth: 2 November 1987 (age 38)
- Place of birth: Las Palmas, Spain
- Height: 1.78 m (5 ft 10 in)
- Positions: Midfielder; left-back

Youth career
- Las Palmas

Senior career*
Years	Team	Apps	(Gls)
2006–2008	Las Palmas B	33	(5)
2007	Las Palmas	1	(0)
2008–2011	Mallorca B	46	(5)
2009–2011	Mallorca	0	(0)
2009	→ Alavés (loan)	7	(0)
2011	→ Ceuta (loan)	14	(3)
2011–2021	Las Palmas	204	(0)
2021–2022	Atromitos	31	(0)
2023–2024	Tamaraceite	11	(0)
Total		347	(13)
- * Club domestic league appearances and goals

Daniel 'Dani' Castellano Betancor (born 2 November 1987) is a Spanish former professional footballer who played as a midfielder or a left-back.

== Club career ==
Born in Las Palmas, Canary Islands, Castellano graduated from UD Las Palmas' academy, and made his senior debut with the reserves in 2006, in the Tercera División. He appeared in his first game as a professional on 15 December 2007, starting in a 3–1 Segunda División away loss against Polideportivo Ejido.

On 31 January 2008, Castellano moved to another reserve team, RCD Mallorca B also in the fourth tier. He first appeared with the main squad on 8 January of the following year, coming on as a late substitute in a 3–1 home win over UD Almería in the Copa del Rey. Eight days later, he was loaned to Segunda División B club Deportivo Alavés until June.

After another loan stint at AD Ceuta, Castellano terminated his contract with the Balearic Islands side in June 2011. Later that month, he returned to his first club Las Palmas agreeing to a three-year deal.

Castellano played 12 games in the 2014–15 campaign, helping to a return to La Liga after 13 years. He made his debut in the competition on 22 August 2015, starting and featuring 80 minutes in a 1–0 defeat at Atlético Madrid.

== Personal life ==
Castellano's twin brother, Javier, was also a footballer and a midfielder. He too represented Las Palmas.
