= 2022–23 Burgos CF season =

Burgos CF
2022–23 season
- President: Rodrigo Santidrián
- Head coach: Julián Calero
- Stadium: Estadio El Plantío
- Segunda División: 7th
- Copa del Rey: First round
- Top goalscorer: League: Gaspar Campos; Curro Sánchez (4 each); All: Gaspar Campos; Curro Sánchez (4 each)
Home colours	Away colours	Third colours
- All statistics correct as of 5 December 2022.

The 2022–23 season is the 38th season in the history of Burgos CF and their second consecutive season in the second division. The club are participating in Segunda División and the Copa del Rey.

== Players ==
As of 2 September 2022.

Note: Flags indicate national team as defined under FIFA eligibility rules; some limited exceptions apply. Players may hold more than one non-FIFA nationality.

No.	Pos.	Nation	Player
1	GK	ESP	Dani Barrio
2	DF	ESP	Borja González
3	DF	ESP	Fran García
4	DF	ESP	Míchel Zabaco
5	MF	ESP	Miguel Atienza
6	DF	ESP	Raúl Navarro
7	FW	ESP	Juan Artola (on loan from Athletic Bilbao)
8	FW	ESP	Pablo Valcarce
9	FW	MAR	Mourad El Ghezouani (on loan from Elche)
10	FW	ESP	Álex Bermejo
11	MF	ESP	Gaspar Campos (on loan from Sporting Gijón)
13	GK	ESP	José Antonio Caro

No.	Pos.	Nation	Player
14	DF	ESP	Unai Elgezabal (captain)
15	FW	ESP	Juan Hernández
16	MF	ESP	Curro Sánchez
17	MF	ESP	Andy Rodríguez
18	DF	ESP	Aitor Córdoba
19	DF	ESP	Jesús Areso (on loan from Osasuna)
20	DF	ESP	Grego Sierra
21	FW	ESP	Saúl Berjón
22	MF	ESP	Miki Muñoz
23	DF	ESP	José Matos
24	MF	ESP	Javi Pérez
25	GK	FRA	Loïc Badiashile

=== Reserve team ===
Note: Flags indicate national team as defined under FIFA eligibility rules; some limited exceptions apply. Players may hold more than one non-FIFA nationality.

No.	Pos.	Nation	Player
27	MF	ESP	Javi López-Pinto
28	DF	ESP	Saúl del Cerro

No.	Pos.	Nation	Player
29	MF	ESP	Marcos Gil
35	GK	ESP	Javi Moral

=== Out on loan ===
Note: Flags indicate national team as defined under FIFA eligibility rules; some limited exceptions apply. Players may hold more than one non-FIFA nationality.

No.	Pos.	Nation	Player
—	DF	ESP	Iván Serrano (at Linares until 30 June 2023)

== Transfers ==
=== In ===
Date	Player	From	Type	Fee	Ref
23 June 2022	(Spain) Borja González	Rayo Majadahonda	Transfer	Undisclosed	
30 June 2022	(France) Loïc Badiashile	Inter de Madrid	Transfer	Free	
30 June 2022	(Spain) Dani Barrio	Málaga	Transfer	Free	
7 July 2022	(Spain) Juan Artola	Athletic Bilbao	Loan		
8 July 2022	(Spain) Miguel Atienza	Eibar	Transfer	Undisclosed	
13 July 2022	(Spain) Churripi	Valladolid	Transfer	Undisclosed	
21 July 2022	(Spain) Álex Bermejo	Tenerife	Transfer	Free	
18 August 2022	(Spain) Gaspar Campos	Sporting Gijón	Loan		
23 August 2022	(Spain) Jesús Areso	Osasuna	Loan		
30 August 2022	(Spain) Javi Pérez	Ibiza	Transfer	Free	
1 September 2022	(Morocco) Mourad Daoudi	Elche	Loan		
1 September 2022	(Spain) Juan Hernández	Ponferradina	Transfer	Free	
3 September 2022	(Spain) Curro Sánchez	Almería	Transfer	Free	

=== Out ===
Date	Player	To	Type	Fee	Ref
1 July 2022	(Spain) Eneko Undabarrena	Intercity	Transfer	Free	
19 July 2022	(Spain) Álvaro Rodríguez	Albacete	Transfer	Undisclosed	
23 July 2022	(Spain) Juanma	Albacete	Transfer	Undisclosed	
26 July 2022	(Serbia) Filip Malbašić	Released			
23 August 2022	(Spain) Iván Serrano	Linares	Loan		

== Pre-season and friendlies ==
Win Draw Loss Fixtures

16 July 2022 Trofeo Ciudad de Medina	Burgos	1–1 (2–4 p)	Alavés	Medina de Pomar
19:00 CEST (UTC+2)				Stadium: Campo de Fútbol Jesús María Pereda

20 July 2022 Friendly	Lugo	1–3	Burgos
CEST (UTC+2)

23 July 2022 Friendly	Burgos	0–0	Valladolid
CEST (UTC+2)

27 July 2022 Friendly	Oviedo	0–1	Burgos
CEST (UTC+2)

30 July 2022 Friendly	Burgos	2–1	Racing Santander
CEST (UTC+2)

5 August 2022 Friendly	Osasuna	1–0	Burgos
CEST (UTC+2)

15 December 2022 Friendly	Burgos	0–3	Athletic Bilbao	Burgos
19:30 CET (UTC+1)		Report	Guruzeta 3', 50'; R. García 58'	Stadium: El Plantío; Referee: Valentín Pizarro Gómez

== Competitions ==
=== Overall record ===
Competition	First match	Last match	Starting round	Record							
Competition	First match	Last match	Starting round	Pld	W	D	L	GF	GA	GD	Win %
Segunda División	13 August 2022		Matchday 1	18	9	7	2	17	7	+10	50.00
Copa del Rey	13 November 2022		First round	1	0	1	0	0	0	+0	0.00
Total				19	9	8	2	17	7	+10	47.37

Last updated: 5 December 2022
Source: Soccerway

=== Segunda División ===
==== League table ====
Pos	Team	Pld	W	D	L	GF	GA	GD	Pts
9	Cartagena	42	16	10	16	47	49	−2	58
10	Tenerife	42	14	15	13	42	37	+5	57
11	Burgos	42	13	15	14	33	35	−2	54 (Note: Burgos finished ahead of Racing Santander on head-to-head points: Racing Santander 0–1 Burgos, Burgos 2–1 Racing Santander.)
12	Racing Santander	42	14	12	16	39	40	−1	54
13	Zaragoza	42	12	17	13	40	39	+1	53 (Note: Zaragoza finished ahead of Leganés on head-to-head goal difference: Leganés 2–1 Zaragoza, Zaragoza 3–0 Leganés.)

Source: LaLiga SmartBank
Rules for classification: 1) points; 2) head-to-head points; 3) head-to-head goal difference; 4) goal difference; 5) number of goals scored
Notes:

Notes

1. Reserve teams are not eligible for promotion to the same league as the first team.

==== Results summary ====
Overall								Home						Away					
Pld	W	D	L	GF	GA	GD	Pts	W	D	L	GF	GA	GD	W	D	L	GF	GA	GD
0	0	0	0	0	0	0	0	0	0	0	0	0	0	0	0	0	0	0	0

Last updated: November 2022.
Source: LaLiga SmartBank

==== Results by round ====
Round	1
Ground	
Result	
Position	

Updated to match(es) played on November 2022. Source: LaLiga SmartBank
A = Away; H = Home; W = Win; D = Draw; L = Loss

==== Matches ====
The league fixtures were announced on 23 June 2022.
