= 2021–22 Burgos CF season =

Burgos CF
2021–22 season
- President: Francisco Caselli
- Head coach: Julián Calero
- Stadium: Estadio El Plantío
- Segunda División: 11th
- Copa del Rey: Second round
- Top goalscorer: League: Pablo Valcarce (10); All: Pablo Valcarce (10)
| Home colours | Away colours | Third colours |

The 2021–22 season was the 37th season in the existence of Burgos CF and the club's first season back in the second division of Spanish football since 2002. In addition to the domestic league, Burgos participated in this season's edition of the Copa del Rey.

== Players ==
=== First-team squad ===
As of 1 February 2022

Note: Flags indicate national team as defined under FIFA eligibility rules; some limited exceptions apply. Players may hold more than one non-FIFA nationality.

| No. | Pos. | Nation | Player |
|---|---|---|---|
| 1 | GK | ESP | Alfonso Herrero |
| 2 | DF | ESP | Álvaro Rodríguez |
| 3 | DF | ESP | Fran García |
| 4 | DF | ESP | Míchel Zabaco |
| 5 | MF | ESP | Eneko Undabarrena (captain) |
| 6 | DF | ESP | Raúl Navarro |
| 7 | FW | ESP | Juanma García (vice-captain) |
| 8 | FW | ESP | Pablo Valcarce |
| 9 | FW | ESP | Guillermo |
| 11 | FW | ESP | Roberto Alarcón |
| 12 | DF | ESP | Miguel Ángel (on loan from Getafe) |
| 13 | GK | ESP | José Antonio Caro (on loan from Valladolid) |

| No. | Pos. | Nation | Player |
|---|---|---|---|
| 14 | DF | ESP | Unai Elgezabal |
| 15 | FW | ESP | Álex Alegría (on loan from Mallorca) |
| 16 | FW | SRB | Filip Malbašić |
| 17 | MF | ESP | Andy Rodríguez |
| 18 | DF | ESP | Aitor Córdoba |
| 19 | FW | ESP | Claudio Medina |
| 20 | DF | ESP | Grego Sierra |
| 21 | FW | ESP | Saúl Berjón |
| 22 | MF | ESP | Miki Muñoz |
| 23 | DF | ESP | José Matos |
| 24 | MF | ESP | Ernesto Gómez |
| 26 | GK | ESP | Óscar López |

=== Reserve team ===
Note: Flags indicate national team as defined under FIFA eligibility rules; some limited exceptions apply. Players may hold more than one non-FIFA nationality.

| No. | Pos. | Nation | Player |
|---|---|---|---|
| 27 | DF | ESP | Saúl del Cerro |
| 28 | FW | ESP | Raúl Pesca |

| No. | Pos. | Nation | Player |
|---|---|---|---|
| 30 | DF | ESP | Iván Serrano |

== Pre-season and friendlies ==
Win Draw Loss

| 17 July 2021 Friendly | Burgos | 0–0 | Lugo | Astorga, Spain |
| 19:00 CEST (UTC+2) | | | | Stadium: Estadio La Eragudina |

| 31 July 2021 Friendly | Real Sociedad B | 0–0 | Burgos | Lasarte-Oria, Spain |
| 19:00 CEST (UTC+2) | | | | Stadium: Zubieta Facilities |

== Competitions ==
=== Overall record ===
| Competition | First match | Last match | Starting round | Final position | Record | | | | | | | |
| Competition | First match | Last match | Starting round | Final position | Pld | W | D | L | GF | GA | GD | Win % |
|---|---|---|---|---|---|---|---|---|---|---|---|---|
| Segunda División | 15 August 2021 | 29 May 2022 | Matchday 1 | 11th | 42 | 15 | 10 | 17 | 41 | 41 | +0 | 35.71 |
| Copa del Rey | 30 November 2021 | 14 December 2021 | First round | Second round | 2 | 1 | 0 | 1 | 1 | 2 | −1 | 50.00 |
| Total | | | | | 44 | 16 | 10 | 18 | 42 | 43 | −1 | 36.36 |

Source: Soccerway

=== Segunda División ===
==== League table ====
| Pos | Team | Pld | W | D | L | GF | GA | GD | Pts |
|---|---|---|---|---|---|---|---|---|---|
| 9 | Cartagena | 42 | 18 | 6 | 18 | 63 | 57 | +6 | 60 |
| 10 | Zaragoza | 42 | 12 | 20 | 10 | 39 | 46 | −7 | 56 |
| 11 | Burgos | 42 | 15 | 10 | 17 | 41 | 41 | 0 | 55 |
| 12 | Leganés | 42 | 13 | 15 | 14 | 50 | 51 | −1 | 54 (Note: Leganés finished ahead of Huesca on head-to-head points: Leganés 2–1 Huesca, Huesca 0–2 Leganés.) |
| 13 | Huesca | 42 | 13 | 15 | 14 | 49 | 44 | +5 | 54 |

Source: LaLiga SmartBank
Rules for classification: 1) points; 2) head-to-head points; 3) head-to-head goal difference; 4) goal difference; 5) number of goals scored

==== Results summary ====
| Overall | | | | | | | | Home | | | | | | Away | | | | | |
| Pld | W | D | L | GF | GA | GD | Pts | W | D | L | GF | GA | GD | W | D | L | GF | GA | GD |
|---|---|---|---|---|---|---|---|---|---|---|---|---|---|---|---|---|---|---|---|
| 42 | 15 | 10 | 17 | 41 | 41 | 0 | 55 | 10 | 7 | 4 | 27 | 12 | +15 | 5 | 3 | 13 | 14 | 29 | −15 |

Source: La Liga SmartBank

==== Results by round ====
| Round | 1 | 2 | 3 | 4 | 5 | 6 | 7 | 8 | 9 | 10 | 11 | 12 | 13 | 14 | 15 | 16 | 17 | 18 | 19 | 20 | 21 | 22 | 23 | 24 | 25 | 26 | 27 | 28 | 29 | 30 | 31 | 32 | 33 | 34 | 35 | 36 | 37 | 38 | 39 | 40 | 41 | 42 |
|---|---|---|---|---|---|---|---|---|---|---|---|---|---|---|---|---|---|---|---|---|---|---|---|---|---|---|---|---|---|---|---|---|---|---|---|---|---|---|---|---|---|---|
| Ground | A | A | H | H | A | H | A | H | A | H | A | H | A | H | A | H | A | H | A | H | A | H | A | H | A | H | A | H | A | A | H | A | H | H | A | H | A | H | A | H | A | H |
| Result | L | D | L | W | D | D | L | W | L | D | W | W | L | L | L | W | L | W | W | W | L | D | L | W | L | W | W | D | L | W | D | L | W | D | L | W | D | L | L | D | W | D |
| Position | 18 | 16 | 20 | 15 | 16 | 16 | 19 | 15 | 17 | 17 | 14 | 10 | 14 | 17 | 18 | 16 | 17 | 15 | 13 | 9 | 10 | 11 | 14 | 11 | 12 | 11 | 9 | 10 | 11 | 9 | 10 | 12 | 10 | 9 | 12 | 10 | 10 | 11 | 12 | 11 | 10 | 11 |

Source: La Liga SmartBank
A = Away; H = Home; W = Win; D = Draw; L = Loss

==== Matches ====
The league fixtures were announced on 30 June 2021.

| 15 August 2021 1 | Sporting Gijón | 1–0 | Burgos | Gijón |
| 17:00 CEST (UTC+2) | Đurđević 66' | Report | | Stadium: El Molinón; Referee: Gorka Sagués Oscoz |

| 23 August 2021 2 | Leganés | 0–0 | Burgos | Leganés |
| 22:00 CEST (UTC+2) | | Report | | Stadium: Butarque; Referee: Rafael Sánchez López |

| 29 August 2021 3 | Burgos | 0–1 | Eibar | Burgos |
| 22:00 CEST (UTC+2) | | Report | Corpas 76' | Stadium: Estadio El Plantío; Referee: David Gálvez Rascón |

| 5 September 2021 4 | Burgos | 3–0 | Valladolid | Burgos |
| 16:00 CEST (UTC+2) | García 36' (pen.), 42'; Valcarce 40' | Report | | Stadium: Estadio El Plantío; Referee: Álvaro Moreno Aragón |

| 11 September 2021 5 | Amorebieta | 2–2 | Burgos | Lezama |
| 16:00 CEST (UTC+2) | | Report | | Stadium: Lezama (field 2); Referee: Alejandro Quintero González |

| 20 September 2021 6 | Burgos | 0–0 | Las Palmas | Burgos |
| 21:00 CEST (UTC+2) | | | | Stadium: Estadio El Plantío |

| 25 September 2021 7 | Ibiza | 2–0 | Burgos | Ibiza |
| 16:00 CEST (UTC+2) | | | | Stadium: Can Misses |

| 3 October 2021 8 | Burgos | 1–0 | Mirandés | Burgos |
| CEST (UTC+2) |

| 10 October 2021 9 | Alcorcón | 1–0 | Burgos | Alcorcón |
| CEST (UTC+2) |

| 17 October 2021 10 | Burgos | 1–1 | Lugo | Burgos |
| CEST (UTC+2) |

| 21 October 2021 11 | Oviedo | 1–3 | Burgos | Oviedo |
| CEST (UTC+2) |

| 24 October 2021 12 | Burgos | 3–1 | Huesca | Burgos |
| CEST (UTC+2) |

| 1 November 2021 13 | Tenerife | 4–0 | Burgos | Santa Cruz de Tenerife |
| 21:00 WET (UTC+1) | Víctor Mollejo 5'; Shashoua 41'; Álex Bermejo (yellow card) 52' (goal) 54'; Álex Muñoz (yellow card) 71'; Enric Gallego 81'; Carlos Ruiz (yellow card) 90+2' | Report | Grego (yellow card) 26' | Stadium: Heliodoro Rodríguez López; Attendance: 12,105; Referee: (Spain) José López Toca |

| 4 November 2021 14 | Burgos | 0–1 | Zaragoza | Burgos |
| CET (UTC+1) |

| 7 November 2021 15 | Almería | 2–0 | Burgos | Almería |
| 18:15 CET | José Carlos Lazo 2'; Curro Sánchez (yellow card) 62'; César de la Hoz (yellow card) 74'; Sadiq (yellow card) 80'; Samú Costa (yellow card) 89'; Arnau Puigmal 90+5' | Report | Unai Elgezabal (yellow card) 42'; Míchel Zabaco (yellow card) 48'; Grego (yellow card) 51'; Miki Muñoz (yellow card) 63'; Caro (yellow card) 82'; Juanma (yellow card) 90+3' | Stadium: Estadio de los Juegos Mediterráneos; Attendance: 9,513; Referee: Aitor Gorostegui Fernández Ortega |

| 14 November 2021 16 | Burgos | 1–0 | Ponferradina | Burgos |
| CET (UTC+1) |

| 21 November 2021 17 | Cartagena | 1–0 | Burgos | Cartagena |
| CET (UTC+1) |

| 27 November 2021 18 | Burgos | 3–0 | Málaga | Burgos |
| CET (UTC+1) |

| 5 December 2021 19 | Real Sociedad B | 0–1 | Burgos | San Sebastián |
| 18:15 CET (UTC+2) | Pokorný (yellow card) 59'; Karrikaburu (yellow card) 90' | Report | Gómez 37'; Grego (yellow card) 90+4' | Stadium: Anoeta; Attendance: 3,586; Referee: Alejandro Quintero |

| 11 December 2021 20 | Burgos | 2–0 | Fuenlabrada | Burgos |
| CET (UTC+1) |

| 17 December 2021 21 | Girona | 3–1 | Burgos | Girona |
| CET (UTC+1) |

| 31 December 2021 22 | Burgos | 2–2 | Amorebieta | Burgos |
| CET (UTC+1) |

| 8 January 2022 23 | Valladolid | 1–0 | Burgos | Valladolid |
| CET (UTC+1) |

| 23 January 2022 24 | Burgos | 4–0 | Leganés | Burgos |
| CET (UTC+1) |

| 29 January 2022 25 | Lugo | 1–0 | Burgos | Lugo |
| CET (UTC+1) |

| 4 February 2022 26 | Burgos | 3–1 | Alcorcón | Burgos |
| CET (UTC+1) |

| 13 February 2022 27 | Las Palmas | 0–2 | Burgos | Las Palmas |
| 21:00 CET (UTC+1) | Raúl Navas (yellow card) 45+1'; Loiodice (yellow card) 63' | Report | Grego (yellow card) 7'; Aitor Córdoba 48'; Unai Elgezabal (yellow card) 56'; Andy 71' | Stadium: Estadio Gran Canaria; Attendance: 9,803; Referee: (Spain) Gorka Sagués Oscoz |

| 20 February 2022 28 | Burgos | 0–1 | Oviedo | Burgos |
| CET (UTC+1) |

| 27 February 2022 29 | Eibar | 2–0 | Burgos | Eibar |
| 14:00 CET (UTC+1) | Blanco 3'; José Corpas 57'; Rahmani (yellow card) 88' | Report | Pablo Valcarce (yellow card) 41'; Unai Elgezabal (yellow card) 71'; Grego (yellow card) 74' | Stadium: Ipurua; Attendance: 5,135; Referee: (Spain) Juan Pulido Santana |

| 5 March 2022 30 | Fuenlabrada | 1–2 | Burgos | Fuenlabrada |
| CET (UTC+1) | Bouldini 47' | | Grego 45'; Guillermo 51' (pen.) | Stadium: Estadio Fernando Torres |

| 13 March 2022 31 | Burgos | 0–0 | Real Sociedad B | Burgos |
| CET (UTC+1) |

| 18 March 2022 32 | Huesca | 1–0 | Burgos | Huesca |
| CET (UTC+1) |

| 27 March 2022 33 | Burgos | 1–0 | Tenerife | Burgos |
| 16:00 CEST (UTC+2) | Miguel Ángel 62'; Raúl Navarro (yellow card) 64'; Roberto Alarcón (yellow card) 90' | Report | Pablo Larrea (yellow card) 38'; Enric Gallego (yellow card) 51' | Stadium: Estadio El Plantío; Attendance: 8,898; Referee: (Spain) Eduardo Prieto Iglesias |

| 3 April 2022 34 | Burgos | 0–0 | Sporting Gijón | Burgos |
| CEST (UTC+2) |

| 10 April 2022 35 | Mirandés | 3–1 | Burgos | Miranda de Ebro |
| CEST (UTC+2) |

| 17 April 2022 36 | Burgos | 2–1 | Ibiza | Burgos |
| CEST (UTC+2) |

| 24 April 2022 37 | Zaragoza | 0–0 | Burgos | Zaragoza |
| 18:30 CEST (UTC+2) | | | | Stadium: La Romareda; Referee: José Antonio López Toca |

| 30 April 2022 38 | Burgos | 0–2 | Almería | Burgos |
| 20:30 CET | Grego (yellow card) 55'; Unai Elgezabal (yellow card) 81' | Report | Robertone 17' (yellow card) 53'; Grego 44' (o.g.); Arnau Puigmal (yellow card) 87' | Stadium: Estadio El Plantío; Attendance: 8,479; Referee: (Spain) Juan Pulido Santana |

| 7 May 2022 39 | Ponferradina | 3–1 | Burgos | Ponferrada |
| CEST (UTC+2) |

| 14 May 2022 40 | Burgos | 1–1 | Cartagena | Burgos |
| CEST (UTC+2) |

| 21 May 2022 41 | Málaga | 0–1 | Burgos | Málaga |
| CEST (UTC+2) | | | Miguel Ángel 41' |

| 29 May 2022 42 | Burgos | 0–0 | Girona | Burgos |
| CEST (UTC+2) |

=== Copa del Rey ===
| 30 November 2021 First round | Montijo | 0–1 | Burgos | Montijo |
| 21:00 | | Report | Riki 90+4' | Stadium: Emilio Macarro Rodríguez; Referee: Álvaro Moreno Aragón |

| 14 December 2021 Second round | Zaragoza | 2–0 | Burgos | Zaragoza |
| 20:00 | Eguaras 34'; González 51' | Report | | Stadium: La Romareda; Referee: Aitor Gorostegui Fernández |
