= 2023–24 Burgos CF season =

Burgos CF
2023–24 season
- President: Rodrigo Santidrián
- Head coach: Bolo
- Stadium: El Plantío
- Segunda División: 9th
- Copa del Rey: Round of 32
- Top goalscorer: League: Curro Sánchez (12); All: Curro Sánchez (12)
- Biggest win: Burgos 4–0 Elche
- Biggest defeat: Oviedo 5–0 Burgos
Home colours	Away colours	Third colours

The 2023–24 season was Burgos Club de Fútbol's 89th season in existence and second consecutive in the Segunda División, the second division of football in Spain. They also competed in the Copa del Rey.

== Players ==
=== First-team squad ===
As of 9 January 2024.

Note: Flags indicate national team as defined under FIFA eligibility rules; some limited exceptions apply. Players may hold more than one non-FIFA nationality.

No.	Pos.	Nation	Player
1	GK	FRA	Loïc Badiashile
2	DF	ESP	Borja González
4	DF	COL	Anderson Arroyo (on loan from Liverpool)
5	MF	ESP	Miguel Atienza
6	DF	ESP	Raúl Navarro (vice-captain)
7	FW	ESP	Dani Ojeda
8	MF	ESP	Ander Martín
9	FW	ESP	Fer Niño
10	FW	ESP	Álex Bermejo
11	FW	ESP	Álex Sancris
12	MF	MTQ	Kévin Appin

No.	Pos.	Nation	Player
13	GK	ESP	José Antonio Caro
14	DF	ESP	Unai Elgezabal (captain)
16	MF	ESP	Curro Sánchez
18	DF	ESP	Aitor Córdoba (3rd captain)
19	FW	ESP	Edu Espiau
20	DF	ESP	Grego Sierra
21	MF	ESP	Joni Montiel (on loan from Rayo Vallecano)
22	MF	ESP	Mumo Muñoz (4th captain)
23	DF	ESP	José Matos
24	DF	MNE	Esteban Saveljich

=== Reserve team ===
Note: Flags indicate national team as defined under FIFA eligibility rules; some limited exceptions apply. Players may hold more than one non-FIFA nationality.

No.	Pos.	Nation	Player
26	GK	VEN	Samuel Rodríguez
28	MF	ESP	Saúl del Cerro
29	GK	ESP	Rubén de Gea
30	FW	ESP	Lucas Ricoy

No.	Pos.	Nation	Player
31	DF	MAR	Oussama El Goumiri
33	DF	ESP	Sergio Fernández
35	FW	ESP	Antonio Molina

=== Out on loan ===
Note: Flags indicate national team as defined under FIFA eligibility rules; some limited exceptions apply. Players may hold more than one non-FIFA nationality.

No.	Pos.	Nation	Player
—	FW	ESP	Javi López (at Algeciras until 30 June 2024)

== Transfers ==
=== In ===
Pos.	Player	Transferred from	Fee	Date	Source
FW	(Spain) Edu Espiau	Ponferradina	Free	1 July 2023	
MF	(Spain) Ander Martín	Real Sociedad B	Free	1 July 2023	
MF	(Spain) Fer Niño	Villarreal B	Free	1 July 2023	
MF	(Spain) Joni Montiel	Rayo Vallecano	Loan	26 January 2024	
DF	(Colombia) Anderson Arroyo	(England) Liverpool	Loan	26 January 2024	

=== Out ===
Pos.	Player	Transferred to	Fee	Date	Source
DF	(Spain) Fran García	(Cyprus) Anorthosis Famagusta	Free	1 July 2023	
MF	(Spain) Pablo Valcarce	Released		1 July 2023	
FW	(Spain) Sergio Castel Martínez	(Cyprus) Anorthosis Famagusta	Free	1 July 2023	
MF	(Spain) Juan Hernández	Malaga CF	Free	3 August 2023	
MF	(Spain) Javi Pérez	Released		16 August 2023	
DF	(Spain) David Goldar	(Cyprus) Pafos		22 August 2023	

== Pre-season and friendlies ==
Win Draw Loss Fixtures

15 July 2023 Friendly	Burgos	0–0	Racing Santander	Burgos
19:00 UTC+2				Stadium: Campo Villarcayo Nela

22 July 2023 Friendly	Burgos	0–1	Amorebieta	Medina de Pomar
19:00 UTC+2			Martín 23' (o.g.)	Stadium: Campo de Fútbol Jesús María Pereda

26 July 2023 Friendly	Burgos	1–0	Cultural Leonesa	Siero
19:00 UTC+2	Martín 53'			Stadium: Campo Municipal de Fútbol Sergio Sánchez López Pepio

29 July 2023 Friendly	Sporting Gijón	1–1	Burgos	Gijón
18:00 UTC+2	Varane 34'		Niño 17'	Stadium: Escuela de Fútbol de Mareo

14 August 2023 Friendly	Burgos	1–1	SD Logroñés	Burgos
11:30 UTC+2	Sancris 39'	Report	Escobar 35'	Stadium: Campo Hernandez Ballesteros; Referee: Pardeiro Puente

== Competitions ==
=== Overall record ===
Competition	First match	Last match	Starting round	Final position	Record							
Competition	First match	Last match	Starting round	Final position	Pld	W	D	L	GF	GA	GD	Win %
Segunda División	13 August 2023	2 June 2024	Matchday 1		31	14	7	10	40	38	+2	45.16
Copa del Rey	1 November 2023	7 January 2024	First round	Round of 32	3	2	0	1	5	5	+0	66.67
Total					34	16	7	11	45	43	+2	47.06

Last updated: 16 March 2024
Source: Soccerway

=== Segunda División ===
==== League table ====
Pos	Team	Pld	W	D	L	GF	GA	GD	Pts
7	Racing Santander	42	18	10	14	63	55	+8	64 (Note: Oviedo finished ahead of Racing Santander on overall goal difference)
8	Levante	42	13	20	9	49	45	+4	59 (Note: Levante finished ahead of Burgos, Racing Ferrol, and Elche on head-to-head points: Levante 12 pts, Burgos 8 pts, Racing Ferrol 8 pts, Elche 4 pts. Burgos finished ahead of Racing Ferrol on head-to-head points: Racing Ferrol 1–1 Burgos, Burgos 2–0 Racing Ferrol)
9	Burgos	42	16	11	15	52	54	−2	59
10	Racing Ferrol	42	15	14	13	49	52	−3	59
11	Elche	42	16	11	15	43	46	−3	59

Updated to match(es) played on 2 Jun 2024. Source: LaLiga HyperMotion
Rules for classification: 1) Points; 2) Head-to-head points; 3) Head-to-head goal difference; 4) Goal difference; 5) Goals scored; 6) Fair-play points
(Note: Head-to-head record is used only after all the matches between the teams in question have been played)

==== Results summary ====
Overall								Home						Away					
Pld	W	D	L	GF	GA	GD	Pts	W	D	L	GF	GA	GD	W	D	L	GF	GA	GD
42	16	11	15	52	54	−2	59	12	8	1	32	14	+18	4	3	14	20	40	−20

Source: LaLiga.com

==== Results by round ====
Round	1	2	3	4	5	6	7	8	9
Ground	H	A	H	A	H	A	H	A	H
Result	D	L	W	L	W	L	W	L	W
Position	14	17	11	14	9	15	9	12	

Updated to match(es) played on 16 March 2024. Source: LaLiga.com
A = Away; H = Home; W = Win; D = Draw; L = Loss

==== Matches ====
The league fixtures were unveiled on 28 June 2023.

13 August 2023 1	Burgos	1–1	Huesca	Burgos
17:00 CEST (UTC+2)	Curro 35' (pen.); Miki (yellow card) 39'; Niño (yellow card) 41'	Report	Vilarrasa 10'; Nieto (yellow card) 35'; Kortajarena (yellow card) 41'; Balboa (yellow card) 80'; Pulido (yellow card) 90+6'	Stadium: El Plantío; Attendance: 7,358; Referee: Andrés Fuentes Molina

19 August 2023 2	Levante	3–2	Burgos	Valencia
19:30 CEST (UTC+2)	Femenías (yellow card) 45'; Lozano (yellow card) 45', (goal) 45+6'; Cantero 45+3'; Bouldini 60'; Postigo (yellow card) 70'; Muñoz (yellow card) 90+9'	Report	Elgezabal (yellow card) 10'; Curro 45'; Espiau (yellow card) 70'; Curro 71' (pen.); Miki (yellow card) 82'	Stadium: Estadi Ciutat de València; Attendance: 12,952; Referee: José Luis Guzmán Mansilla

26 August 2023 3	Burgos	1–0	Oviedo	Burgos
17:00 CEST (UTC+2)	Niño 14', (yellow card) 71'; Grego (yellow card) 45+4'; Matos (yellow card) 88'; Curro (yellow card) 90+1'	Report	Seoane (yellow card) 9' (yellow-red card) 40'; Costas (yellow card) 34'; Calvo (yellow card) 60'	Stadium: El Plantío; Attendance: 9,854; Referee: Dámaso Arcediano Monescillo

2 September 2023 4	Sporting Gijón	2–1	Burgos	Gijón
16:15 CEST (UTC+2)	Otero 18'; Queipo 90+8'	Report	Curro 59'	Stadium: El Molinón; Attendance: 16,890; Referee: Raúl Martín González Francés

9 September 2023 5	Burgos	1–0	Eibar	Burgos
16:15 CEST (UTC+2)	Curro 65' (pen.)	Report		Stadium: El Plantío; Attendance: 8,553; Referee: Rafael Sánchez López

16 September 2023 6	Albacete	2–1	Burgos	Albacete
21:00 CEST (UTC+2)	Quiles 3' (pen.); Glauder 53'	Report	Niño 60'	Stadium: Carlos Belmonte; Attendance: 10,008; Referee: Rubén Ávalos Barrera

23 September 2023 7	Burgos	4–0	Elche	Burgos
18:30 CEST (UTC+2)	Caro (yellow card) 16'; Espiau (yellow card) 23'; Curro 38' (pen.), 45+3'; Ojeda 66'; Appin (yellow card) 81'; Bermejo 88'	Report	Fernández (yellow card) 45+2'	Stadium: El Plantío; Attendance: 8,753; Referee: Adrián Cordero Vega

1 October 2023 8	Valladolid	3–0	Burgos	Valladolid
18:30 CEST (UTC+2)	Marcos André 6'; Monchu 41'; Meseguer 68'; Escudero (yellow card) 71'; Rosa (yellow card) 74'	Report	Ojeda (yellow card) 53'; Miki (yellow card) 69'	Stadium: Estadio José Zorrilla; Attendance: 20,493; Referee: José Antonio López Toca

4 October 2023 9	Burgos	1–0	Leganés	Burgos
21:30 CEST (UTC+2)	Curro 1'	Report		Stadium: El Plantío; Attendance: 8,254; Referee: Iván Caparrós Hernández

30 October 2023 13	Burgos	1–1	Zaragoza	Burgos
21:00 CET (UTC+1)				Stadium: El Plantío

5 November 2023 14	Eldense	2–0	Burgos	Elda
21:00 CET (UTC+1)

19 November 2023 16	Racing Ferrol	1–1	Burgos	Ferrol
14:00 CET (UTC+1)

25 November 2023 17	Burgos	0–0	Andorra	Burgos
16:15 CET (UTC+1)				Stadium: El Plantío

3 December 2023 18	Amorebieta	0–1	Burgos	Lezama
21:00 CET (UTC+1)				Stadium: Instalaciones de Lezama Campo 2

17 February 2024 27	Oviedo	5–0	Burgos	Oviedo
16:15	Moyano 15', 45', 50'; Seoane 43'; Bastón 88' (pen.)			Stadium: Estadio Carlos Tartiere; Referee: Saúl Ais Reig

24 March 2024 32	Huesca	v	Burgos	Huesca
16:15 CET (UTC+1)				Stadium: El Alcoraz

29 March 2024 33	Burgos	v	Espanyol	Burgos
20:30 CET (UTC+1)				Stadium: El Plantío

26 May 2024 41	Burgos	v	Tenerife	Burgos
CEST (UTC+2)				Stadium: El Plantío

=== Copa del Rey ===
2 November 2023 First round	Hércules	1–2	Burgos	Alicante
20:30 CET (UTC+1)	Grego 35' (o.g.)	Report	Niño 19'; López-Pinto 51'	Stadium: Estadio José Rico Pérez; Referee: Raúl Martín González Francés

6 December 2023 Second round	Arenteiro	1–3	Burgos	O Carballiño
16:00 CET (UTC+1)	Ramos 20'		Bermejo 8', 44'; Appin 54'	Stadium: Estadio de Espiñedo; Referee: José Antonio López Toca

7 January 2024 Round of 32	Burgos	0–3	Mallorca	Burgos
12:00 CET (UTC+1)	Sancris (yellow card) 68'	Report	Sánchez (yellow card) 58'; González 63'; Van der Heyden (yellow card) 68'; Larin 74'; Abdón 81'	Stadium: El Plantío; Attendance: 10,653; Referee: Isidro Díaz de Mera Escuderos
