= Roberto Alarcón =

Roberto Alarcón may refer to:

- Roberto Alarcón (footballer, born 1994), Spanish football winger
- Roberto Alarcón (footballer, born 1998), Spanish football defender
