= 2015–16 Sevilla FC season =

109th season in existence of Sevilla FC

Sevilla FC
2015–16 season
- President: José Castro Carmona
- Head coach: Unai Emery
- Stadium: Ramón Sánchez Pizjuán
- La Liga: 7th
- Copa del Rey: Runners-up
- UEFA Champions League: Group stage
- UEFA Europa League: Winners
- UEFA Super Cup: Runners-up
- Top goalscorer: League: Kevin Gameiro (16); All: Kevin Gameiro (29)
Home colours	Away colours	Third colours

The 2015–16 season was the 109th season in Sevilla Fútbol Club's history, and 15th consecutive season in La Liga. The team competed in La Liga, the Copa del Rey, the UEFA Champions League and the UEFA Europa League, winning the latter competition for a record third consecutive year. Sevilla did not win any away matches in La Liga.

== Players ==
=== Squad information ===
As of 16 January 2016

Note: Flags indicate national team as defined under FIFA eligibility rules; some limited exceptions apply. Players may hold more than one non-FIFA nationality.

No.	Pos.	Nation	Player
1	GK	ESP	Sergio Rico
2	DF	FRA	Benoît Trémoulinas
3	DF	FRA	Adil Rami
4	MF	POL	Grzegorz Krychowiak
5	DF	FRA	Timothée Kolodziejczak
6	DF	POR	Daniel Carriço
7	MF	DEN	Michael Krohn-Dehli
8	MF	ESP	Vicente Iborra
9	FW	FRA	Kevin Gameiro
10	MF	ESP	José Antonio Reyes (captain)
13	GK	POR	Beto
14	MF	URU	Sebastián Cristóforo

No.	Pos.	Nation	Player
15	MF	FRA	Steven Nzonzi
16	MF	ESP	Luismi
17	DF	ITA	Marco Andreolli (on loan from Internazionale)
18	DF	ESP	Sergio Escudero
19	MF	ARG	Éver Banega
20	MF	ESP	Vitolo
21	DF	ARG	Nicolás Pareja
22	MF	UKR	Yevhen Konoplyanka
23	DF	ESP	Coke (vice-captain)
24	FW	ESP	Fernando Llorente
25	DF	BRA	Mariano
31	GK	ESP	David Soria

=== Goals scored (per player) ===
As of 18 May 2016

Rank	Player	UCL	UEL	USC	La Liga	Copa del Rey	Total
1	(France) Gameiro	1	6	1	18	3	29
2	(Argentina) Banega	2	0	1	5	1	9
2	(Spain) Iborra	0	1	0	7	1	9
4	(Ukraine) Konoplyanka	2	0	1	4	1	8
5	(Spain) Llorente	1	2	0	4	0	7
6	(Spain) Coke	0	2	0	1	2	5
6	(Spain) Vitolo	1	1	0	2	1	5
8	(Italy) Immobile	0	0	0	2	2	4
8	(Denmark) Krohn-Dehli	0	0	0	1	3	4
8	(France) Nzonzi	0	0	0	2	2	4
8	(Spain) Reyes	0	0	1	1	2	4
12	(France) Rami	0	0	0	1	2	3
13	(Spain) Juan Muñoz	0	0	0	1	1	2
14	(Portugal) Carriço	0	0	0	1	0	1
14	(Spain) Escudero	0	0	0	1	0	1
14	(Spain) González	0	0	0	1	0	1
14	(France) Kakuta	0	0	0	0	1	1
14	(France) Kolodziejczak	0	1	0	0	0	1
14	(Poland) Krychowiak	0	0	0	0	1	1
14	(Brazil) Mariano	0	1	0	0	0	1
14	(France) Trémoulinas	1	0	0	0	0	1

== Pre-season & friendlies ==
31 May 2015 Friendly	Hassania Agadir	2–1	Sevilla	Agadir, Morocco
--:-- CEST (UTC+02:00)		Report		Stadium: Stade Adrar

25 July 2015 Friendly	Werder Bremen	3–1	Sevilla	Bremen, Germany
--:-- CEST (UTC+02:00)		Report		Stadium: Weserstadion

26 July 2015 Friendly	Reims	1–2	Sevilla	Reims, France
--:-- CEST (UTC+02:00)		Report		Stadium: Stade Auguste Delaune

1 August 2015 Friendly	Watford	0–1	Sevilla	Watford, England
20:45 CEST (UTC+02:00)		Report		Stadium: Vicarage Road

2 August 2015 Friendly	Brighton & Hove Albion	1–0	Sevilla	Falmer, England
16:00 CEST (UTC+02:00)		Report		Stadium: Falmer Stadium

8 August 2015 Friendly	AEK Athens	1–1	Sevilla	Athens, Greece
20:00 CEST (UTC+02:00)		Report		Stadium: Athens Olympic Stadium

14 August 2015 Friendly	Roma	6–4	Sevilla	Rome, Italy
20:00 CEST (UTC+02:00)		Report		Stadium: Stadio Olimpico

== Competitions ==
=== Overall ===
Competition	Started round	Final position / round	First match	Last match
UEFA Super Cup	Final	Runners-up	11 August 2015	
La Liga	Matchday 1	7th	21 August 2015	8 May 2016
UEFA Champions League	Group stage	Group stage	15 September 2015	8 December 2015
Copa del Rey	Round of 32	Runners-up	2 December 2015	22 May 2016
UEFA Europa League	Round of 32	Winners	18 February 2016	18 May 2016

Updated to match played 22 May 2016
Source: Competitions

=== Overview ===
Competition	Record							
Competition	Pld	W	D	L	GF	GA	GD	Win %
La Liga	38	14	10	14	51	50	+1	36.84
UEFA Champions League	6	2	0	4	8	11	−3	33.33
Copa del Rey	9	7	1	1	22	4	+18	77.78
UEFA Europa League	9	6	2	1	17	8	+9	66.67
Total	62	29	13	20	98	73	+25	46.77

Last updated: 22 May 2016
Source: Competitions

=== UEFA Super Cup ===
11 August 2015 Final	Barcelona (Spain)	5–4 (a.e.t.)	(Spain) Sevilla	Tbilisi, Georgia
20:45 CEST (UTC+02:00)	Messi 7', 16'; Rafinha 44'; Suárez 52'; Mathieu (yellow card) 71'; Pedro (yellow card) 94', (goal) 115'; Busquets (yellow card) 117'; Alves (yellow card) 120'	Report	Banega 3', (yellow card) 90+2'; Krychowiak (yellow card) 14'; Reyes 57'; Gameiro 72' (pen.); Konoplyanka 81'; Coke (yellow card) 87'; Immobile (yellow card) 92'; Krohn-Dehli (yellow card) 120'	Stadium: Boris Paichadze Dinamo Arena; Attendance: 54,550; Referee: Willie Collum (Scotland)

=== La Liga ===
==== League table ====
Pos	Team	Pld	W	D	L	GF	GA	GD	Pts	Qualification or relegation
5	Athletic Bilbao	38	18	8	12	58	45	+13	62	Qualification for the Europa League group stage (Note: Since the winners of the 2015–16 Copa del Rey, Barcelona, qualified for European competition based on league position, the spot awarded to the cup winners (Europa League group stage) was passed to the sixth-placed team and the spot awarded to the sixth-placed team (Europa League third qualifying round) was passed to the seventh-placed team.)
6	Celta Vigo	38	17	9	12	51	59	−8	60	Qualification for the Europa League group stage
7	Sevilla	38	14	10	14	51	50	+1	52	Qualification for the Champions League group stage (Note: Sevilla qualified for the Champions League group stage by winning the 2015–16 UEFA Europa League. Based on their league position (7th), they would have received the spot above to enter the Europa League third qualifying round. This spot was vacated without replacement as per UEFA regulations.)
8	Málaga	38	12	12	14	38	35	+3	48 (Note: Málaga finished ahead of Real Sociedad on head-to-head record; Málaga 3–1 Real Sociedad, Real Sociedad 1–1 Málaga.)	
9	Real Sociedad	38	13	9	16	45	48	−3	48	

Source: La Liga, Soccerway
Rules for classification: 1) Points; 2) Head-to-head points; 3) Head-to-head goal difference; 4) Goal difference; 5) Goals scored; 6) Fair-play points; 7) Play-off.

==== Results summary ====
Overall								Home						Away					
Pld	W	D	L	GF	GA	GD	Pts	W	D	L	GF	GA	GD	W	D	L	GF	GA	GD
38	14	10	14	51	50	+1	52	14	1	4	38	21	+17	0	9	10	13	29	−16

Last updated: 14 May 2016.
Source: Competitive matches

==== Results by round ====
Round	1	2	3	4	5	6	7	8	9	10	11	12	13	14	15	16	17	18	19	20	21	22	23	24	25	26	27	28	29	30	31	32	33	34	35	36	37	38
Ground	A	H	A	H	A	H	H	A	H	A	H	A	H	A	H	A	H	A	H	H	A	H	A	H	A	A	H	A	H	A	H	A	H	A	H	A	H	A
Result	D	L	D	L	L	W	W	D	W	L	W	L	W	D	W	D	W	L	W	W	D	W	D	W	D	L	W	D	W	L	L	L	D	L	W	L	L	L
Position	13	17	18	20	20	15	12	13	8	11	10	11	10	10	7	8	8	9	7	7	7	5	5	5	5	5	5	5	5	6	7	7	7	7	7	7	7	7

Updated to match(es) played on 14 May 2016. Source: Competitive matches
A = Away; H = Home; W = Win; D = Draw; L = Loss

==== Matches ====
Win Draw Loss

21 August 2015 1	Málaga	0–0	Sevilla	Málaga
20:30 CEST (UTC+02:00)	Darder (yellow card) 37'; Charles (yellow card) 42'; Boka (yellow card) 64'	Report	Rami (yellow card) 42'; Nzonzi (yellow card) 47' (yellow-red card) 69'; Mariano (yellow card) 76'; Beto (yellow card) 80'	Stadium: La Rosaleda; Attendance: 30,372; Referee: Alfonso Javier Álvarez Izquierdo (Catalonia)

30 August 2015 2	Sevilla	0–3	Atlético Madrid	Seville
20:30 CEST (UTC+02:00)	Banega (yellow card) 20'; Krychowiak (yellow card) 20'; Konoplyanka (yellow card) 77'	Report	Koke 35'; Tiago (yellow card) 43'; Godín (yellow card) 44'; Griezmann (yellow card) 46'; Gabi 78'; Juanfran (yellow card) 80'; Martínez 85'	Stadium: Ramón Sánchez Pizjuán; Attendance: 38,986; Referee: Carlos Clos Gómez (Aragon)

11 September 2015 3	Levante	1–1	Sevilla	Valencia
20:30 CEST (UTC+02:00)	Camarasa 58'; Morales (yellow card) 62'; Juanfran (yellow card) 81'; Ghilas (yellow card) 82'	Report	Kakuta (yellow card) 5'; Nzonzi 12'; Konoplyanka (yellow card) 38'; Trémoulinas (yellow card) 64'	Stadium: Estadi Ciutat de València; Attendance: 14,775; Referee: Ignacio Iglesias Villanueva (Galicia)

20 September 2015 4	Sevilla	1–2	Celta Vigo	Seville
12:00 CEST (UTC+02:00)	Banega (yellow card) 40'; Krychowiak (yellow card) 51'; Llorente 54'; Reyes (yellow card) 65'	Report	Gómez (yellow card) 6'; Nolito 15'; Wass 26'; Jonny (yellow card) 45+2' (yellow-red card) 90+1'; Aspas (yellow card) 58'; Mallo (yellow card) 72'; Orellana (yellow card) 87'; Fernández (yellow card) 87'	Stadium: Ramón Sánchez Pizjuán; Attendance: 35,744; Referee: Santiago Jaime Latre

23 September 2015 5	Las Palmas	2–0	Sevilla	Las Palmas
22:00 CEST (UTC+02:00)	Wakaso (yellow card) 9'; Mesa 30'; Aythami (yellow card) 44'; Bigas (yellow card) 57'; Alcaraz 76'	Report	Llorente (yellow card) 19'; Iborra (yellow card) 51'; Krohn-Dehli (yellow card) 67'; Reyes (yellow card) 90+3'	Stadium: Gran Canaria; Attendance: 19,733; Referee: Carlos del Cerro Grande

26 September 2015 6	Sevilla	3–2	Rayo Vallecano	Seville
20:30 CEST (UTC+02:00)	Iborra (yellow card) 16'; Gameiro 23'; Nzonzi 45+1'; Konoplyanka 86'	Report	Llorente (yellow card) 15'; Amaya (yellow card) 16' (yellow-red card) 83'; Bebé 51'; Guerra 68'; Trashorras (yellow card) 87'	Stadium: Ramón Sánchez Pizjuán; Attendance: 33,779; Referee: Alejandro José Hernández

4 October 2015 7	Sevilla	2–1	Barcelona	Seville
17:00 CEST (UTC+02:00)	Krychowiak (yellow card) 19'; Andreolli (yellow card) 22'; Kolodziejczak (yellow card) 33'; Krohn-Dehli 52'; Iborra 58'; Trémoulinas (yellow card) 73'; Llorente (yellow card) 75'	Report	Busquets (yellow card) 28'; Mathieu (yellow card) 48'; Alba (yellow card) 60'; Neymar 74' (pen.)	Stadium: Ramón Sánchez Pizjuán; Attendance: 39,374; Referee: Jesús Gil Manzano

17 October 2015 8	Eibar	1–1	Sevilla	Eibar
19:15 CEST (UTC+02:00)	Borja 8'; Juncà (yellow card) 54'; García (yellow card) 63'; Pantić (yellow card) 88'	Report	Nzonzi (yellow card) 31'; Gameiro 71'; Immobile (yellow card) 90+3'; Coke (yellow card) 90+4'	Stadium: Ipurua Municipal Stadium; Attendance: 5,462; Referee: Juan Martínez Munuera

24 October 2015 9	Sevilla	5–0	Getafe	Seville
21:30 CET (UTC+01:00)	Gameiro 35', 45', 60' (pen.); Banega 50' (pen.); Iborra (yellow card) 51'; Konoplyanka 81' (pen.)	Report	Vigaray (yellow card) 49' (yellow-red card) 59'; J. Rodríguez (yellow card) 52'	Stadium: Ramón Sánchez Pizjuán; Attendance: 34,658; Referee: Vicandi Garrido

31 October 2015 10	Villarreal	2–1	Sevilla	Villarreal
19:15 CET (UTC+01:00)	Bailly (yellow card) 10'; Mario 25'; Bakambu (yellow card) 32', (goal) 61'; Soldado (yellow card) 50'; Jaume (yellow card) 82'; Ruiz (yellow card) 90+4'	Report	Iborra (yellow card) 29'; Rami (yellow card) 63'; Llorente 76'; Konoplyanka (yellow card) 87'	Stadium: Estadio El Madrigal; Attendance: 15,918; Referee: José María Sánchez Martínez

8 November 2015 11	Sevilla	3–2	Real Madrid	Seville
20:30 CET (UTC+01:00)	Immobile 36', (yellow card) 37'; Banega 61'; Llorente 74'	Report	Nacho (yellow card) 5'; Ramos 22'; Rodríguez 90+3'	Stadium: Ramón Sánchez Pizjuán; Attendance: 40,377; Referee: José Luis González González

21 November 2015 12	Real Sociedad	2–0	Sevilla	San Sebastián
16:00 CET (UTC+01:00)	Yuri (yellow card) 40'; Agirretxe 73'; Prieto 77'; Illarramendi (yellow card) 81'	Report	Andreolli (yellow card) 7'	Stadium: Anoeta; Attendance: 19,839; Referee: Mateu Lahoz

29 November 2015 13	Sevilla	1–0	Valencia	Seville
20:30 CET (UTC+01:00)	Rami (yellow card) 17'; Escudero 50'; Mariano (yellow card) 71'; Vitolo (yellow card) 84'	Report	Cancelo (yellow card) 13' (yellow-red card) 35'; Abdennour (yellow card) 20'; Fuego (yellow card) 57' (yellow-red card) 78'	Stadium: Ramón Sánchez Pizjuán; Attendance: 34,914; Referee: Carlos Velasco Carballo

5 December 2015 14	Deportivo La Coruña	1–1	Sevilla	A Coruña
22:00 CET (UTC+01:00)	Cani (yellow card) 10'; Lucas 22'; Mosquera (yellow card) 88'	Report	Kolodziejczak (yellow card) 25'; Krychowiak (yellow card) 56'; Iborra (yellow card) 74', (goal) 76'	Stadium: Riazor; Attendance: 25,013; Referee: Ricardo de Burgos Bengoetxea

12 December 2015 15	Sevilla	2–0	Sporting Gijón	Seville
20:30 CET (UTC+01:00)	Kolodziejczak (yellow card) 30'; Banega (yellow card) 72'; Gameiro 75' (pen.), 80', (yellow card) 83'	Report	Ndi (yellow card) 32'; Hernández (yellow card) 54' (yellow-red card) 74'; Bernardo (yellow card) 69'	Stadium: Ramón Sánchez Pizjuán; Attendance: 29,211; Referee: Del Cerro Grande

19 December 2015 16	Real Betis	0–0	Sevilla	Seville
20:30 CET (UTC+01:00)	Molinero (yellow card) 4'; Westermann (yellow card) 18'; Ceballos (yellow card) 50'; Cejudo (yellow card) 62'; Joaquín (yellow card) 69'; Adán (yellow card) 79'; Digard (yellow card) 90+2'	Report	Krychowiak (yellow card) 28'; Vitolo (yellow card) 56'; Trémoulinas (yellow card) 63'; Rami (yellow card) 79'; Iborra (yellow card) 89'	Stadium: Benito Villamarín; Attendance: 50,073; Referee: Clos Gómez

30 December 2015 17	Sevilla	2–0	Espanyol	Seville
18:15 CET (UTC+01:00)	Immobile 16'; Banega 41', (yellow card) 44'; Cristóforo (yellow card) 59'; Reyes (yellow card) 75'	Report	Salva (yellow card) 25'; Roco (yellow card) 42'; Jordán (yellow card) 68'	Stadium: Ramón Sánchez Pizjuán; Attendance: 35,544; Referee: Iglesias Villanueva

3 January 2016 18	Granada	2–1	Sevilla	Granada
16:00 CET (UTC+01:00)	Success 17', (yellow card) 89'; Peñaranda 37'; Édgar (yellow card) 43'	Report	Vitolo 45+1'; Rami (yellow card) 56' (yellow-red card) 86'; Mariano (yellow card) 59'	Stadium: Los Cármenes; Attendance: 13,469; Referee: Undiano Mallenco

9 January 2016 19	Sevilla	2–0	Athletic Bilbao	Seville
18:15 CET (UTC+01:00)	Gameiro 24', 59' (pen.); Vitolo (yellow card) 54'; Krohn-Dehli (yellow card) 89'	Report	Aduriz (yellow card) 52'; Laporte (yellow card) 57'; Balenziaga (yellow card) 77'	Stadium: Ramón Sánchez Pizjuán; Attendance: 35,388; Referee: Prieto Iglesias

16 January 2016 20	Sevilla	2–1	Málaga	Seville
16:00 CET (UTC+01:00)	Coke (yellow card) 25'; Gameiro 40', 42'; Cristóforo (yellow card) 45+1'; Iborra (yellow card) 81' (yellow-red card) 83'	Report	Čop (yellow card) 29'; Camacho (yellow card) 57'; Charles 72'; Boka (yellow card) 90+1' (yellow-red card) 90+2'	Stadium: Ramón Sánchez Pizjuán; Attendance: 34,371; Referee: Estrada Fernández

24 January 2016 21	Atlético Madrid	0–0	Sevilla	Madrid
16:00 CET (UTC+01:00)	Augusto (yellow card) 5'; Carrasco (yellow card) 63'; Correa (yellow card) 86'; Filipe Luís (yellow card) 87'; Gabi (yellow card) 90+1'	Report	Vitolo (yellow card) 32' (yellow-red card) 61'; Llorente (yellow card) 35'; Carriço (yellow card) 68'; Rico (yellow card) 82'	Stadium: Vicente Calderón Stadium; Attendance: 52,793; Referee: Iglesias Villanueva

30 January 2016 22	Sevilla	3–1	Levante	Sevilla
12:00 CET (UTC+01:00)	Gameiro 1'; Iborra 47'; Cristóforo (yellow card) 73'; Konoplyanka 76'	Report	Toño (yellow card) 22'; Rossi 55'	Stadium: Ramón Sánchez Pizjuán; Attendance: 33,487; Referee: Álvarez Izquierdo

7 February 2016 23	Celta Vigo	1–1	Sevilla	Vigo
18:15 CET (UTC+01:00)	Gómez (yellow card) 8'; Bongonda (yellow card) 28'; Iago Aspas (yellow card) 41'; Beauvue 64'	Report	Fazio (yellow card) 3' (yellow-red card) 25'; Konoplyanka (yellow card) 34'; Carriço 43'; Escudero (yellow card) 72'; Rico (yellow card) 74'	Stadium: Balaídos; Attendance: 16,420; Referee: Carlos Velasco Carballo

14 February 2016 24	Sevilla	2–0	Las Palmas	Sevilla
16:00 CET (UTC+01:00)	Kolodziejczak (yellow card) 64'; Banega 69'; Gameiro 75'	Report	Garrido (yellow card) 36'; Willian José (yellow card) 82'; Wakaso (yellow card) 87'	Stadium: Ramón Sánchez Pizjuán; Attendance: 34,448; Referee: Prieto Iglesias

21 February 2016 25	Rayo Vallecano	2–2	Sevilla	Madrid
12:00 (UTC+1)	Baena (yellow card) 16'; Manucho 43'; Jozabed (yellow card) 44'; Miku (yellow card) 57', (goal) 62'; Embarba (yellow card) 64'; Llorente (yellow card) 75'; Hernández (yellow card) 90+3'	Report	Nzonzi 10'; Iborra 20'; Coke (yellow card) 59'; Banega (yellow card) 90+1'	Stadium: Vallecas; Attendance: 12,375; Referee: Javier Estrada Fernández

28 February 2016 26	Barcelona	2–1	Sevilla	Barcelona
20:30 CET (UTC+01:00)	Messi 31'; Piqué 48', (yellow card) 90'; Alves (yellow card) 71'; Roberto (yellow card) 74'	Report	Vitolo 20'; Rami (yellow card) 30'; Kolodziejczak (yellow card) 77'	Stadium: Camp Nou; Attendance: 79,684; Referee: Santiago Jaime Latre

2 March 2016 27	Sevilla	1–0	Eibar	Sevilla
20:00 CET (UTC+01:00)	Llorente 11'	Report		Stadium: Ramón Sánchez Pizjuán; Attendance: 29,627; Referee: Juan Martínez Munuera

5 March 2016 28	Getafe	1–1	Sevilla	Getafe
20:30 CET (UTC+01:00)	Emi Buendía (yellow card) 53'; Sarabia (yellow card) 71'; Velázquez (yellow card) 78', (goal) 86'; Cala (yellow card) 90+2'; Vázquez (yellow card) 90+2'	Report	Nzonzi (yellow card) 55'; Carriço (yellow card) 73'; Banega 79'	Stadium: Coliseum Alfonso Pérez; Attendance: 6,478; Referee: Eduardo Prieto Iglesias

13 March 2016 29	Sevilla	4–2	Villarreal	Seville
16:00 CET (UTC+01:00)	Banega (yellow card) 6' (yellow-red card) 79'; Iborra 23'; Ruiz 51' (o.g.); Konoplyanka 65'; Krohn-Dehli (yellow card) 74'; Reyes 90+1'	Report	Bonera (yellow card) 25'; Bakambu 29', 37'	Stadium: Ramón Sánchez Pizjuán; Attendance: 35,069; Referee: Carlos Velasco Carballo

20 March 2016 30	Real Madrid	4–0	Sevilla	Madrid
20:30 CET (UTC+01:00)	Benzema 6'; Varane (yellow card) 26'; Casemiro (yellow card) 54'; Ronaldo 64'; Bale 66'; Jesé 86'	Report	Reyes (yellow card) 57'; Krychowiak (yellow card) 62'	Stadium: Santiago Bernabéu; Attendance: 72,976; Referee: Xavier Estrada Fernández

3 April 2016 31	Sevilla	1–2	Real Sociedad	Seville
20:30 CET (UTC+01:00)	Vitolo (yellow card) 25'; Rami (yellow card) 28'; Gameiro 51' (pen.); Mariano (yellow card) 52'; Reyes (yellow card) 63'	Report	Bergara 2', (yellow card) 50' (yellow-red card) 68'; Oyarzabal (yellow card) 26'; Krychowiak 34' (o.g.); Rulli (yellow card) 75'; Berchiche (yellow card) 90+3'	Stadium: Ramón Sánchez Pizjuán; Attendance: 32,163; Referee: Carlos Clos Gómez

10 April 2016 32	Valencia	2–1	Sevilla	Valencia
16:30 CEST (UTC+02:00)	Mustafi (yellow card) 32'; Parejo 41'; Pérez (yellow card) 88'; Negredo 90+1'	Report	Llorente (yellow card) 56'; Gameiro 86'	Stadium: Mestalla; Attendance: 41,569; Referee: Iñaki Vicandi Garrido

17 April 2016 33	Sevilla	1–1	Deportivo La Coruña	Seville
16:00 CEST (UTC+02:00)	Iborra 21'; Carriço (yellow card) 68'; Curro (yellow card) 70'	Report	Lopo (yellow card) 61'; Riera 81', (yellow card) 84'	Stadium: Ramón Sánchez Pizjuán; Attendance: 30,390; Referee: Santiago Jaime Latre

20 April 2016 34	Sporting Gijón	2–1	Sevilla	Gijón
20:45	Krychowiak 22' (o.g.); Cuéllar (yellow card) 53'; Lora (yellow card) 81'; López 90+1'	Report	Iborra 8'; Cristóforo (yellow card) 61'	Stadium: El Molinón; Attendance: 22,985; Referee: González González

24 April 2016 35	Sevilla	2–0	Real Betis	Seville
16:00 CEST (UTC+02:00)	Banega (yellow card) 9'; Gameiro (yellow card) 49', (goal) 67'; Reyes (yellow card) 66'; Coke 80'; Escudero (yellow card) 82'; Mariano (yellow card) 90'	Report	Musonda (yellow card) 13'; Pezzella (yellow card) 33'; Cejudo (yellow card) 57'; Westermann (yellow card) 79'	Stadium: Ramón Sánchez Pizjuán; Attendance: 39,523; Referee: Carlos Velasco Carballo

1 May 2016 36	Espanyol	1–0	Sevilla	Barcelona
21:00 CET (UTC+01:00)	Caicedo 52'; Cañas (yellow card) 77'; Ó. Duarte (yellow card) 87'; Álvaro (yellow card) 90+2'	Report	Figueiras (yellow card) 78'; Iborra (yellow card) 90+2'	Stadium: Cornellà-El Prat; Attendance: 27,654; Referee: Juan Martínez Munuera

8 May 2016 37	Sevilla	1–4	Granada	Seville
17:00 CEST (UTC+02:00)	Curro (yellow card) 40'; Kolodziejczak (yellow card) 58'; González 73'; Carriço (yellow card) 79'; Figueiras (yellow card) 85'	Report	Doucouré (yellow card) 40'; Cuenca 45', 89'; Babin 79'; El-Arabi 86' (pen.)	Stadium: Ramón Sánchez Pizjuán; Attendance: 21,915

14 May 2016 38	Athletic Bilbao	3–1	Sevilla	Bilbao
17:00 CEST (UTC+02:00)	García (yellow card) 5', (goal) 71'; Aduriz 11', 31'; Rico (red card) 90'	Report	Cristóforo (yellow card) 39'; Muñoz 55'; Kolodziejczak (red card) 58'; Curro (yellow card) 60'	Stadium: San Mamés; Attendance: 43,876; Referee: Alfonso Javier Álvarez Izquierdo

=== Copa del Rey ===
==== Results summary ====
Overall							Home						Away					
Pld	W	D	L	GF	GA	GD	W	D	L	GF	GA	GD	W	D	L	GF	GA	GD
9	7	1	1	22	24	+20	4	0	0	12	0	+12	3	1	1	10	4	+6

==== Matches ====
Win Draw Loss

===== Round of 32 =====
2 December 2015 First leg	UD Logroñés	0–3	Sevilla	Logroño
21:00 UTC+1		Report	Coke 12'; Krohn-Dehli 37'; Immobile 57'	Stadium: Las Gaunas; Attendance: 5,314; Referee: Hernández Hernández

15 December 2015 Second leg	Sevilla	2–0 (5–0 agg.)	UD Logroñés	Sevilla
21:00 UTC+1	Immobile 15'; Reyes 40'	Report		Stadium: Ramón Sánchez Pizjuán; Attendance: 14,666; Referee: Gil Manzano

===== Round of 16 =====
6 January 2016 First leg	Real Betis	0–2	Sevilla	Sevilla
18:15 UTC+1		Report	Krohn-Dehli 13'; Krychowiak 49'	Stadium: Benito Villamarín; Attendance: 36,832; Referee: Del Cerro Grande

12 January 2016 Second leg	Sevilla	4–0 (6–0 agg.)	Real Betis	Sevilla
20:30 UTC+1	Reyes 4'; Rami 35'; Gameiro 73'; Kakuta 89'	Report		Stadium: Ramón Sánchez Pizjuán; Attendance: 36,812; Referee: Mateu Lahoz

===== Quarter-finals =====
21 January 2016 First leg	Sevilla	2–0	Mirandés	Sevilla
21:00 UTC+1	Nzonzi 20'; Vitolo 90+4'	Report		Stadium: Ramón Sánchez Pizjuán; Attendance: 25,341; Referee: Ricardo de Burgos Bengoetxea

28 January 2016 Second leg	Mirandés	0–3 (0–5 agg.)	Sevilla	Miranda de Ebro
20:00 UTC+1		Report	Iborra 9' (pen.); Muñoz 70'; Coke 90+2'	Stadium: Anduva; Attendance: 4,426; Referee: Vicandi Garrido

===== Semi-finals =====
4 February 2016 First leg	Sevilla	4–0	Celta Vigo	Sevilla
20:30 UTC+1	Rami 45'; Gameiro 60', 62'; Krohn-Dehli 87'	Report		Stadium: Ramón Sánchez Pizjuán; Attendance: 36,659; Referee: Clos Gómez

11 February 2016 Second leg	Celta Vigo	2–2 (2–6 agg.)	Sevilla	Vigo
21:00 UTC+1	Aspas 36', 55'	Report	Banega 57'; Konoplyanka 87'	Stadium: Balaídos; Referee: Juan Martínez Munuera

==== Final ====
22 May 2016 Final	Barcelona	2–0 (a.e.t.)	Sevilla	Madrid
21:30 CEST (UTC+02:00)	Mascherano (red card) 36'; Alba (yellow card) 87', (goal) 97'; Neymar (yellow card) 89', (goal) 120+2'; Alves (yellow card) 90'; Iniesta (yellow card) 90'	Report	Rami (yellow card) 73'; Vitolo (yellow card) 75'; Banega (red card) 90+2'; Iborra (yellow card) 90+5'; Krychowiak (yellow card) 92'; Konoplyanka (yellow card) 102'; Escudero (yellow card) 104'; Gameiro (yellow card) 114'; Carriço (yellow card) 120+1' (yellow-red card) 120+1'	Stadium: Vicente Calderón; Attendance: 54,907; Referee: Carlos del Cerro Grande (Community of Madrid)

=== UEFA Champions League ===
==== Group stage ====
Pos	Team	Pld	W	D	L	GF	GA	GD	Pts	Qualification	MCI	JUV	SEV	BMG
1	(England) Manchester City	6	4	0	2	12	8	+4	12	Advance to knockout phase	—	1–2	2–1	4–2
2	(Italy) Juventus	6	3	2	1	6	3	+3	11	Advance to knockout phase	1–0	—	2–0	0–0
3	(Spain) Sevilla	6	2	0	4	8	11	−3	6	Transfer to Europa League	1–3	1–0	—	3–0
4	(Germany) Borussia Mönchengladbach	6	1	2	3	8	12	−4	5		1–2	1–1	4–2	—

Source: UEFA
Rules for classification: Group stage tiebreakers

15 September 2015 1	Sevilla (Spain)	3–0	(Germany) Borussia Mönchengladbach	Seville, Spain
20:45 CEST (UTC+02:00)	Gameiro 47' (pen.); Banega 66' (pen.); Reyes (yellow card) 78'; Konoplyanka 84'; Nzonzi (yellow card) 89'	Report	Brouwers (yellow card) 49'; Sommer (yellow card) 49'; Stindl (yellow card) 52'	Stadium: Ramón Sánchez Pizjuán; Referee: Pavel Královec (Czech Republic)

30 September 2015 2	Juventus (Italy)	2–0	(Spain) Sevilla	Turin, Italy
20:45 CEST (UTC+02:00)	Morata 41'; Zaza 87'	Report	Coke (yellow card) 78'	Stadium: Juventus Stadium; Attendance: 36,499; Referee: Jonas Eriksson (Sweden)

21 October 2015 3	Manchester City (England)	2–1	(Spain) Sevilla	Manchester, England
20:45 CEST (UTC+02:00)	Rami 36' (o.g.); De Bruyne 90+1'	Report	Konoplyanka 30'	Stadium: City of Manchester Stadium; Attendance: 45,595; Referee: Bas Nijhuis (Netherlands)

3 November 2015 4	Sevilla (Spain)	1–3	(England) Manchester City	Seville, Spain
20:45 CET (UTC+01:00)	Trémoulinas 25'	Report	Sterling 8'; Fernandinho 11'; Bony 36'	Stadium: Ramón Sánchez Pizjuán; Attendance: 39,261; Referee: Svein Oddvar Moen (Norway)

25 November 2015 5	Borussia Mönchengladbach (Germany)	4–2	(Spain) Sevilla	Mönchengladbach, Germany
20:45 CET (UTC+01:00)	Stindl 29', 83'; Johnson 68'; Raffael 78'	Report	Vitolo 82'; Banega 90+1' (pen.)	Stadium: Borussia-Park; Attendance: 45,177; Referee: Damir Skomina (Slovenia)

8 December 2015 6	Sevilla (Spain)	1–0	(Italy) Juventus	Seville, Spain
20:45 CET (UTC+01:00)	Llorente 65'	Report		Stadium: Ramón Sánchez Pizjuán; Attendance: 35,583; Referee: Szymon Marciniak (Poland)

=== UEFA Europa League ===
==== Knockout phase ====
===== Round of 32 =====
18 February 2016 First leg	Sevilla (Spain)	3–0	(Norway) Molde	Seville, Spain
19:00 UTC+1	Llorente 35', 49'; Gameiro 72'	Report	Gulbrandsen (yellow card) 10'; Diouf (yellow card) 12'	Stadium: Ramón Sánchez Pizjuán; Attendance: 28,920; Referee: Gediminas Mažeika (Lithuania)

25 February 2016 Second leg	Molde (Norway)	1–0 (1–3 agg.)	(Spain) Sevilla	Molde, Norway
21:00 UTC+1	E. Hestad 43'; Forren (yellow card) 66'	Report		Stadium: Aker Stadion; Attendance: 7,284; Referee: Bobby Madden (Scotland)

===== Round of 16 =====
10 March 2016 First leg	Basel (Switzerland)	0–0	(Spain) Sevilla	Basel, Switzerland
19:00 UTC+1	Samuel (yellow card) 8'; Steffen (yellow card) 90'	Report	Banega (yellow card) 37'; Cristóforo (yellow card) 41'; Nzonzi (yellow card) 75' (yellow-red card) 87'; Trémoulinas (yellow card) 85'	Stadium: St. Jakob-Park; Attendance: 22,403; Referee: Anthony Taylor (England)

17 March 2016 Second leg	Sevilla (Spain)	3–0 (3–0 agg.)	(Switzerland) Basel	Seville, Spain
21:05 UTC+1	Kolodziejczak (yellow card) 7'; Rami 35'; Gameiro 44', 45'	Report	Steffen (yellow card) 39'; Embolo (yellow card) 90+4'	Stadium: Ramón Sánchez Pizjuán; Attendance: 35,546; Referee: Deniz Aytekin (Germany)

===== Quarter-finals =====
7 April 2016 First leg	Athletic Bilbao (Spain)	1–2	(Spain) Sevilla	Bilbao, Spain
21:05 CEST (UTC+02:00)	Aduriz 48'; Balenziaga (yellow card) 51'; De Marcos (yellow card) 72'	Report	Kolodziejczak 56'; Rami (yellow card) 68'; Banega (yellow card) 70'; Iborra 83'; Vitolo (yellow card) 88'	Stadium: San Mamés; Attendance: 40,856; Referee: Mark Clattenburg (England)

14 April 2016 Second leg	Sevilla (Spain)	1–2 (a.e.t.) (3–3 agg.) (5–4 p)	(Spain) Athletic Bilbao	Seville, Spain
21:05 CEST (UTC+02:00)	Gameiro 59'; Rami (yellow card) 86'; Nzonzi (yellow card) 105+1'; Coke (yellow card) 114'; Konoplyanka (yellow card) 116'	Report	Bóveda (yellow card) 28'; Aduriz 57'; San José (yellow card) 65'; Balenziaga (yellow card) 74'; García 80'; Viguera (yellow card) 86'; Muniain (yellow card) 95'; Iraizoz (yellow card) 98'; De Marcos (yellow card) 102'; Etxeita (yellow card) 105+1'	Stadium: Ramón Sánchez Pizjuán; Attendance: 38,567; Referee: Damir Skomina (Slovenia)
	Penalties
	Coke (penalty scored); Krychowiak (penalty scored); Konoplyanka (penalty scored); Nzonzi (penalty scored); Gameiro (penalty scored)		(penalty scored) García; (penalty scored) Viguera; (penalty scored) San José; (penalty missed) Beñat; (penalty scored) Susaeta

===== Semifinals =====
28 April 2016 First leg	Shakhtar Donetsk (Ukraine)	2–2	(Spain) Sevilla	Lviv, Ukraine
21:05 CEST (UTC+02:00)	Marlos 23'; Stepanenko 36'; Malyshev (yellow card) 89'; Srna (yellow card) 90'	Report	Vitolo 6'; Escudero (yellow card) 26'; Carriço (yellow card) 39'; Krychowiak (yellow card) 47'; Gameiro 82' (pen.)	Stadium: Arena Lviv; Attendance: 34,267; Referee: Szymon Marciniak (Poland)

5 May 2016 Second leg	Sevilla (Spain)	3–1	(Ukraine) Shakhtar Donetsk	Seville, Spain
21:05 CEST (UTC+02:00)	Gameiro 9', 47'; Banega (yellow card) 29'; Mariano 59'; Vitolo (yellow card) 87'	Report	Marlos (yellow card) 11'; Rakytskyi (yellow card) 14'; Kucher (yellow card) 20'; Eduardo 44', (yellow card) 61'; Srna (yellow card) 48'; Ismaily (yellow card) 90'	Stadium: Ramón Sánchez Pizjuán; Referee: Björn Kuipers (Netherlands)

===== Final =====
18 May 2016 Final	Liverpool (England)	1–3	(Spain) Sevilla	Basel, Switzerland
20:45 CEST (UTC+02:00)	Lovren (yellow card) 30'; Sturridge 35'; Origi (yellow card) 72'; Clyne (yellow card) 90+4'	Report	Gameiro 46'; Vitolo (yellow card) 56'; Banega (yellow card) 57'; Coke 64', 70'; Rami (yellow card) 77'; Mariano (yellow card) 84'	Stadium: St. Jakob-Park; Attendance: 34,429; Referee: Jonas Eriksson (Sweden)

== Statistics ==
=== Appearances and goals ===
Last updated on 18 May 2016

No.	Pos	Nat	Player	Total		La Liga		Copa del Rey		Champions League		Europa League		Super Cup	
No.	Pos	Nat	Player	Apps	Goals	Apps	Goals	Apps	Goals	Apps	Goals	Apps	Goals	Apps	Goals
Goalkeepers
1	GK	(Spain) ESP	Sergio Rico	45	0	34	0	5	0	6	0	0	0	0	0
13	GK	(Portugal) POR	Beto	5	0	4	0	0	0	0	0	0	0	1	0
31	GK	(Spain) ESP	David Soria	13	0	0	0	4	0	0	0	9	0	0	0
Defenders
2	DF	(France) FRA	Benoît Trémoulinas	37	1	24	0	2	0	6	1	4	0	1	0
3	DF	(France) FRA	Adil Rami	46	3	28	0	6	2	4	0	7	1	1	0
5	DF	(France) FRA	Timothée Kolodziejczak	50	1	26+3	0	6+2	0	6	0	6+1	1	0	0
6	DF	(Portugal) POR	Daniel Carriço	25	1	11+3	1	4+1	0	0	0	5+1	0	0	0
17	DF	(Italy) ITA	Marco Andreolli	9	0	7	0	0	0	2	0	0	0	0	0
18	DF	(Spain) ESP	Sergio Escudero	28	1	13+2	1	6	0	0	0	5+2	0	0	0
21	DF	(Argentina) ARG	Nicolás Pareja	2	0	1+1	0	0	0	0	0	0	0	0	0
23	DF	(Spain) ESP	Coke	42	5	20+1	1	7	2	6	0	5+2	2	1	0
25	DF	(Brazil) BRA	Mariano	37	1	18+5	0	3	0	0+4	0	6	1	0+1	0
26	DF	(Spain) ESP	David Carmona	1	0	1	0	0	0	0	0	0	0	0	0
29	DF	(Spain) ESP	José Matos	1	0	1	0	0	0	0	0	0	0	0	0
34	DF	(Spain) ESP	Diego González	4	1	1+1	1	2	0	0	0	0	0	0	0
Midfielders
4	MF	(Poland) POL	Grzegorz Krychowiak	42	0	25+1	0	2+1	0	6	0	5+1	0	1	0
7	MF	(Denmark) DEN	Michael Krohn-Dehli	47	4	16+11	1	5+1	3	2+4	0	5+2	0	1	0
8	MF	(Spain) ESP	Vicente Iborra	47	8	21+8	7	7	0	2+1	0	3+4	1	1	0
10	MF	(Spain) ESP	José Antonio Reyes	34	4	14+10	1	4+1	2	2	0	2	0	1	1
14	MF	(Uruguay) URU	Sebastián Cristóforo	33	0	17+4	0	5+1	0	0	0	3+3	0	0	0
15	MF	(France) FRA	Steven Nzonzi	46	3	22+6	3	5+1	0	3+2	0	7	0	0	0
16	MF	(Spain) ESP	Luismi	2	0	0	0	2	0	0	0	0	0	0	0
19	MF	(Argentina) ARG	Éver Banega	45	8	20+5	5	5+1	0	5	2	8	0	1	1
20	MF	(Spain) ESP	Vitolo	47	4	23+5	2	5+1	0	5	1	7	1	1	0
22	MF	(Ukraine) UKR	Yevhen Konoplyanka	52	7	15+17	4	3+4	0	5+1	2	2+4	0	0+1	1
27	MF	(Spain) ESP	Antonio Cotán	1	0	1	0	0	0	0	0	0	0	0	0
36	MF	(Spain) ESP	Curro	6	0	3+1	0	1+1	0	0	0	0	0	0	0
Forwards
9	FW	(France) FRA	Kevin Gameiro	52	29	22+9	16	4+2	3	4+1	1	7+2	8	1	1
11	FW	(Spain) ESP	Juan Muñoz	10	1	3+5	1	1	0	0+1	0	0	0	0	0
24	FW	(Spain) ESP	Fernando Llorente	36	7	14+9	4	1+5	0	2+1	1	2+2	2	0	0
28	FW	(Spain) ESP	Carlos Fernández	1	0	0+1	0	0	0	0	0	0	0	0	0
Players who have made an appearance this season but have left the club
16	DF	(Argentina) ARG	Federico Fazio	6	0	4	0	0	0	0	0	1+1	0	0	0
17	DF	(Portugal) POR	Diogo Figueiras	4	0	4	0	0	0	0	0	0	0	0	0
12	MF	(Democratic Republic of the Congo) COD	Gaël Kakuta	5	0	1+1	0	1+2	0	0	0	0	0	0	0
11	FW	(Italy) ITA	Ciro Immobile	15	4	4+4	2	3	2	0+3	0	0	0	0+1	0
