= José Joaquín Matos =

Spanish footballer

Personal information
- Full name: José Joaquín Matos García
- Date of birth: 6 May 1995 (age 31)
- Place of birth: Utrera, Spain
- Height: 1.68 m (5 ft 6 in)
- Position: Left-back

Team information
- Current team: Ceuta
- Number: 3

Youth career
- Sevilla

Senior career*
Years	Team	Apps	(Gls)
2013–2018	Sevilla B	137	(1)
2015–2016	Sevilla	1	(0)
2018–2021	Cádiz	21	(0)
2019–2020	→ Twente (loan)	2	(0)
2020–2021	→ Málaga (loan)	30	(0)
2021–2024	Burgos	99	(3)
2024–2025	Cádiz	27	(1)
2025–	Ceuta	33	(4)
- * Club domestic league appearances and goals as of 9 June 2026

José Joaquín Matos García (born 6 May 1995) is a Spanish professional footballer who plays as a left-back for AD Ceuta FC.

== Career ==
Born in Utrera, Seville, Andalusia, Matos was a Sevilla FC youth graduate. On 17 March 2013, aged only 17, he made his senior debut for the reserves by coming on as a late substitute in a 2–0 Segunda División B away loss against La Roda CF.

Despite being used sparingly, Matos was definitely promoted to the B-team only in the 2014–15 campaign. An undisputed starter, he appeared in 36 matches (all starts) as his side narrowly avoided relegation.

On 1 May 2016, Matos made his first team – and La Liga – debut, starting in a 1–0 loss at RCD Espanyol. He scored his first professional goal with the B's on 7 January 2018, in a 3–2 home defeat of Lorca FC in the Segunda División.

On 4 July 2018, free agent Matos signed a three-year contract with Cádiz CF in the second division. Roughly one year later, he extended his contract until 2022 and was loaned to Eredivisie side FC Twente for one year.

Matos returned to his parent club after having played only two league matches for Twente, and moved to Málaga CF on 16 September 2020, also in a temporary one-year deal. Upon returning, he terminated his contract with Cádiz on 15 July 2021, and signed for Burgos CF late in the month.

On 6 August 2023, during a pre-season friendly against Deportivo Alavés, Matos injured Giuliano Simeone after a tackle; the Argentine broke his fibula and also suffered an ankle injury. The following 6 July, he returned to Cádiz on a two-year deal.

On 21 July 2025, Matos terminated his link with the Yellow Submarine, and joined fellow second division side AD Ceuta FC on a two-year contract just hours later.

== Career statistics ==
As of match played on 23 November 2023

Appearances and goals by club, season and competition
Club	Season	League			National cup		Continental		Other		Total	
Club	Season	Division	Apps	Goals	Apps	Goals	Apps	Goals	Apps	Goals	Apps	Goals
Sevilla Atlético	2012–13	Segunda División B	1	0	—		—		—		1	0
Sevilla Atlético	2013–14	Segunda División B	1	0	—		—		—		1	0
Sevilla Atlético	2014–15	Segunda División B	36	0	—		—		—		36	0
Sevilla Atlético	2015–16	Segunda División B	35	0	—		—		6 (Note: Appearances in the 2016 Segunda División B playoffs)	0	41	0
Sevilla Atlético	2016–17	Segunda División	40	0	0	0	—		—		40	0
Sevilla Atlético	2017–18	Segunda División	24	1	0	0	—		—		24	1
Sevilla Atlético	Total		137	1	0	0	0	0	6	0	143	1
Sevilla	2015–16	La Liga	1	0	0	0	—		—		1	0
Cádiz	2018–19	Segunda División	21	0	2	0	—		—		23	0
FC Twente (loan)	2019–20	Eredivisie	2	0	0	0	—		—		2	0
Málaga (loan)	2020–21	Segunda División	30	0	1	0	—		—		31	0
Burgos	2021–22	Segunda División	33	0	1	0	—		—		34	0
Burgos	2022–23	Segunda División	29	0	0	0	—		—		29	0
Burgos	2023–24	Segunda División	15	2	0	0	—		—		15	2
Burgos	Total		77	2	1	0	0	0	0	0	78	2
Career total			268	3	4	0	0	0	6	0	278	3
