= Raúl Navarro (footballer) =

Spanish footballer

Personal information
- Full name: Raúl Navarro del Río
- Date of birth: 7 February 1994 (age 32)
- Place of birth: Seville, Spain
- Height: 1.85 m (6 ft 1 in)
- Position: Right back

Team information
- Current team: Sloga Doboj
- Number: 6

Youth career
- Salesianos Triana
- Utrera
- 2004–2013: Sevilla

Senior career*
Years	Team	Apps	(Gls)
2013–2016	Sevilla C	95	(4)
2016	Sevilla B	4	(0)
2016–2017	Almería B	28	(0)
2017–2020	Valladolid B	91	(2)
2020–2025	Burgos	114	(1)
2026–	Sloga Doboj	1	(0)
- * Club domestic league appearances and goals as of 8 August 2026

Raúl Navarro del Río (born 7 February 1994) is a Spanish footballer who plays as a right back or a midfielder for Bosnian Premier League club Sloga Doboj.

== Club career ==
Navarro was born in Seville, Andalusia, represented Colegio Salesianos de Triana, CD Utrera and Sevilla FC as a youth. He made his senior debut with the C-team on 17 March 2013, coming on as a second-half substitute in a 0–0 Tercera División away draw against CMD San Juan.

Navarro subsequently established himself as a regular starter for the C-side, and also appeared rarely with the reserves during the 2015–16 season, as the club achieved promotion in Segunda División B. On 17 July 2016, he signed for another reserve team, UD Almería B in the fourth tier.

On 12 July 2017, Navarro agreed to a deal with Real Valladolid, being assigned to B-team in the third level. He moved to fellow league team Burgos CF on 7 August 2020, and helped in their promotion to Segunda División after a 19-year absence in 2021.

Navarro made his professional debut on 15 August 2021, starting in a 0–1 away draw against Sporting de Gijón. On 7 June 2023, he renewed his contract until 2025.

== Career statistics ==
As of match played 8 August 2026

Appearances and goals by club, season and competition
Club	Season	League			National cup (Note: Includes Copa del Rey)		Other		Total	
Club	Season	Division	Apps	Goals	Apps	Goals	Apps	Goals	Apps	Goals
Sevilla FC C	2012–13	Tercera División	1	0	—		—		1	0
Sevilla FC C	2013–14	Tercera División	31	0	—		—		31	0
Sevilla FC C	2014–15	Tercera División	40	4	—		—		40	4
Sevilla FC C	2015–16	Tercera División	23	0	—		—		23	0
Sevilla FC C	Total		95	4	—		—		95	4
Sevilla Atlético	2015–16	Segunda División B	4	0	—		—		4	0
UD Almería B	2016–17	Tercera División	28	0	—		—		28	0
Real Valladolid Promesas	2017–18	Segunda División B	31	0	—		—		31	0
Real Valladolid Promesas	2018–19	Segunda División B	34	1	—		—		34	1
Real Valladolid Promesas	2019–20	Segunda División B	26	1	—		1 (Note: Appearance in the 2020 Segunda División B play-offs)	0	27	1
Real Valladolid Promesas	Total		91	2	—		1	0	92	2
Burgos CF	2020–21	Segunda División B	24	1	2	0	2 (Note: Appearances in the 2021 Segunda División B play-offs)	0	28	1
Burgos CF	2021–22	Segunda División	32	0	2	0	—		34	0
Burgos CF	2022–23	Segunda División	38	0	2	0	—		40	0
Burgos CF	2023–24	Segunda División	13	0	2	0	—		15	0
Burgos CF	2024–25	Segunda División	7	0	—		—		7	0
Burgos CF	Total		114	1	8	0	2	0	124	1
Sloga Doboj	2026–27	Bosnian Premier League	1	0	0	0	—		1	0
Career total			333	7	8	0	3	0	344	7
