= CD Minera =

Spanish football club

Minera
- Full name: Club Deportiva Minera
- Nickname: Águilas Rojas (Red Eagles)
- Founded: 1927
- Ground: Ángel Celdrán, Llano del Beal, Cartagena, Murcia, Spain
- Capacity: 2,000
- President: José Blaya
- Manager: Alejandro Sandroni
- League: Segunda Federación – Group 3
- 2025–26: Segunda Federación – Group 4, 2nd of 18
Home colours	Away colours

Club Deportiva Minera is a Spanish football team based in Llano del Beal, Cartagena, in the Region of Murcia. Founded in 1927 it plays in Segunda Federación – Group 3, holding home games at Estadio Municipal Ángel Celdrán, with a capacity of 2,000 seats.

== History ==
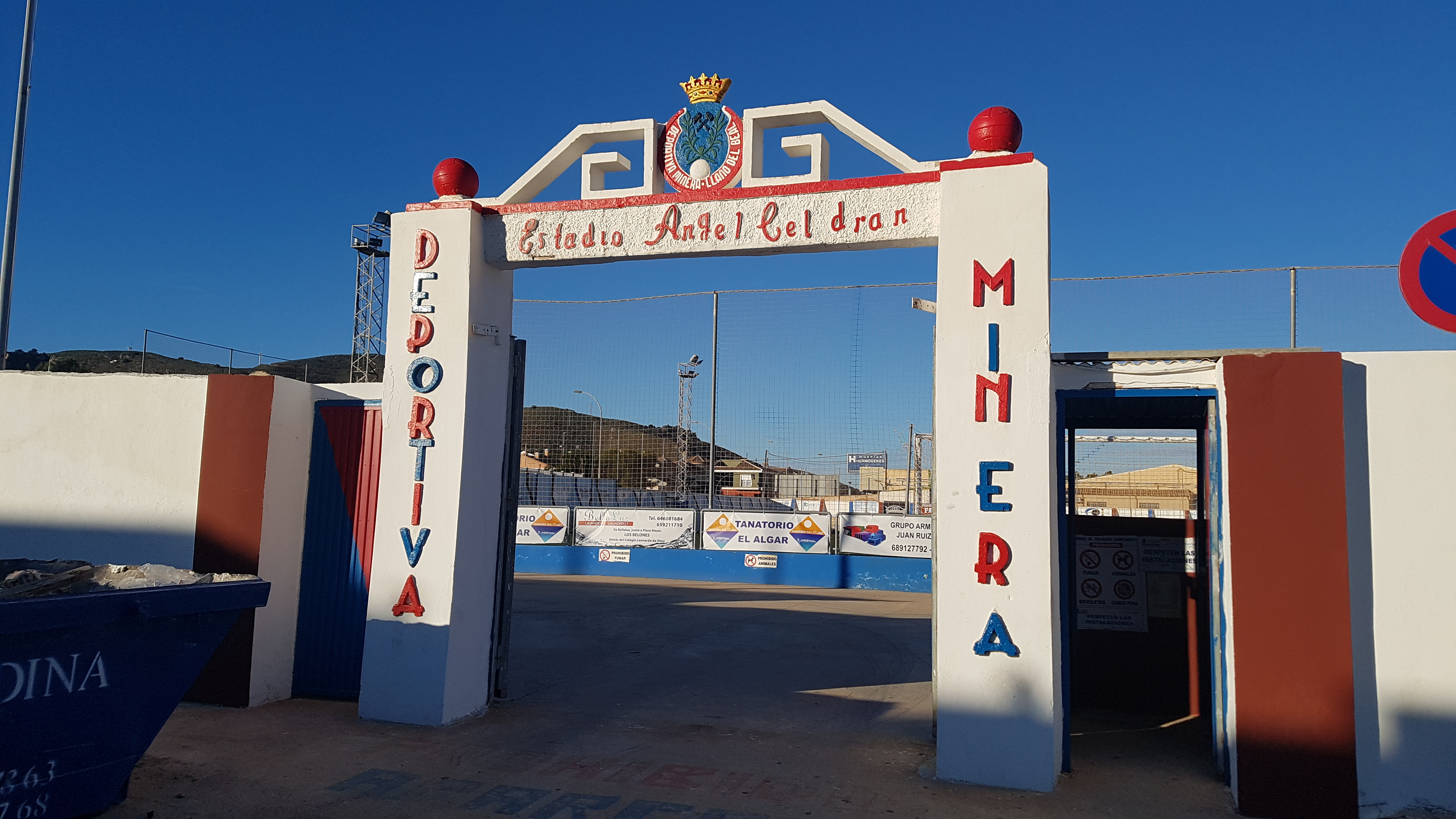
Estadio Municipal Ángel Celdrán in 2022

Founded in 1927, the club started playing in the Segunda Regional in 1952, and reached Tercera División four years later. The club ceased activities in 1961, only returning seven years later.

Minera only returned to Tercera (now the fourth tier) in 2011, after finishing third in the Preferente Autonómica. In April 2024, the club assured the first position of their group in the 2023–24 Tercera Federación, achieving a first-ever promotion to the Segunda Federación.

On 5 December 2024, Minera club knocked La Liga side Deportivo Alavés out of the Copa del Rey, after a 2–2 draw and a 4–2 win on penalties.

== Season to season ==
Season	Tier	Division	Place	Copa del Rey
1952–53	5	2ª Reg.	2nd	
1953–54	4	1ª Reg.	5th	
1954–55	4	1ª Reg.	5th	
1955–56	4	1ª Reg.	2nd	
1956–57	3	3ª	9th	
1957–58	3	3ª	16th	
1958–59	4	1ª Reg.	10th	
1959–60	4	1ª Reg.	16th	
1960–61	4	1ª Reg.	16th	
1961–1968	DNP			
1968–69	5	2ª Reg.	5th	
1969–70	5	2ª Reg.	4th	
1970–71	5	2ª Reg.	7th	
1971–72	5	1ª Reg.	17th	
1972–73	5	1ª Reg.	16th	
1973–74	5	1ª Reg.	8th	
1974–75	5	1ª Reg.	8th	
1975–76	5	1ª Reg.	12th	
1976–77	5	1ª Reg.	6th	
1977–78	6	1ª Reg.	16th	

Season	Tier	Division	Place	Copa del Rey
1978–79	7	2ª Reg.	5th	
1979–80	7	2ª Reg.	1st	
1980–81	6	1ª Reg.	2nd	
1981–82	5	Reg. Pref.	9th	
1982–83	5	Reg. Pref.	16th	
1983–84	6	1ª Reg.	8th	
1984–85	6	1ª Reg.	10th	
1985–86	6	1ª Reg.	5th	
1986–87	6	1ª Reg.	6th	
1987–88	5	Reg. Pref.	9th	
1988–89	5	Reg. Pref.	12th	
1989–90	5	Reg. Pref.	15th	
1990–91	5	Reg. Pref.	17th	
1991–92	6	1ª Reg.	5th	
1992–93	5	Reg. Pref.	15th	
1993–94	5	Reg. Pref.	17th	
1994–95	6	1ª Reg.	3rd	
1995–96	5	Reg. Pref.	7th	
1996–97	5	Terr. Pref.	15th	
1997–98	5	Terr. Pref.	10th	

Season	Tier	Division	Place	Copa del Rey
1998–99	5	Terr. Pref.	8th	
1999–2000	5	Terr. Pref.	6th	
2000–01	5	Terr. Pref.	11th	
2001–02	5	Terr. Pref.	17th	
2002–03	5	Terr. Pref.	15th	
2003–04	5	Terr. Pref.	12th	
2004–05	5	Terr. Pref.	10th	
2005–06	5	Terr. Pref.	13th	
2006–07	5	Terr. Pref.	16th	
2007–08	5	Terr. Pref.	12th	
2008–09	5	Terr. Pref.	6th	
2009–10	5	Terr. Pref.	6th	
2010–11	5	Terr. Pref.	3rd	
2011–12	4	3ª	12th	
2012–13	4	3ª	5th	
2013–14	4	3ª	8th	
2014–15	4	3ª	7th	
2015–16	4	3ª	9th	
2016–17	4	3ª	16th	
2017–18	4	3ª	12th	

Season	Tier	Division	Place	Copa del Rey
2018–19	4	3ª	9th	
2019–20	4	3ª	12th	
2020–21	4	3ª	7th / 1st	
2021–22	5	3ª RFEF	13th	
2022–23	5	3ª Fed.	13th	
2023–24	5	3ª Fed.	1st	
2024–25	4	2ª Fed.	11th	Round of 32
2025–26	4	2ª Fed.	2nd	
2026–27	4	2ª Fed.		TBD

- 3 seasons in Segunda Federación
- 12 seasons in Tercera División
- 3 seasons in Tercera Federación/Tercera División RFEF

== Current squad ==
As of 1 March 2026

Note: Flags indicate national team as defined under FIFA eligibility rules; some limited exceptions apply. Players may hold more than one non-FIFA nationality.

No.	Pos.	Nation	Player
1	GK	ESP	Ventura Gómez
2	DF	ESP	Diego Mirapeix
3	DF	ESP	Álex Macías
4	DF	ESP	Manu Galán
5	MF	ARG	Damián Petcoff
6	MF	ESP	Javi Vera
7	FW	ESP	Roberto Alarcón
8	MF	ESP	Mohamed Kamal
9	FW	ESP	Rubén Mesa
10	FW	ESP	Omar Perdomo
11	FW	ESP	Fran Viñuela

No.	Pos.	Nation	Player
13	GK	ESP	Álex Lázaro
15	DF	ESP	Sebas Holgado
16	FW	ESP	Kike Carrasco
18	FW	SEN	Babacar Fedior
19	FW	ESP	Óscar Zorrilla
20	DF	ESP	Paco Torres
21	DF	IRL	Kevin Toner
22	FW	ESP	Pitu
23	FW	ESP	Simón Moreno
26	FW	ESP	David Barceló
