= Anderson Arroyo =

Colombian footballer (born 1999)

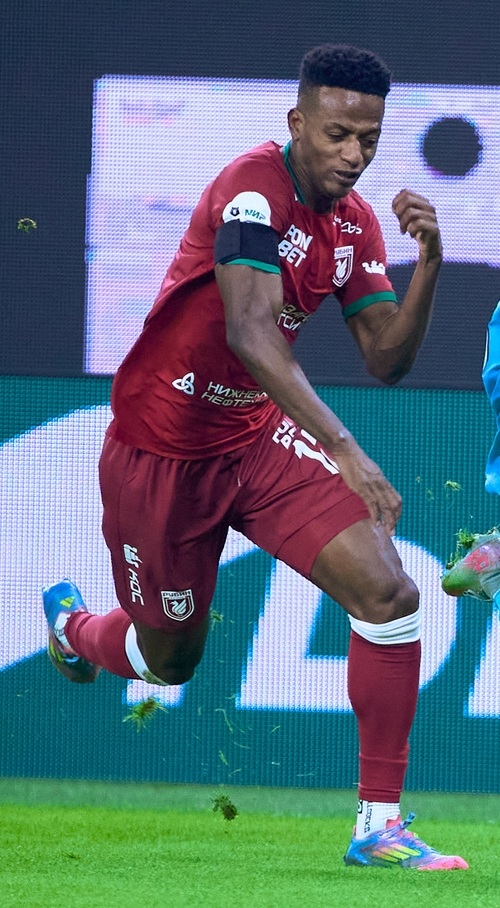
- Arroyo with Rubin Kazan in 2025

Personal information
- Full name: Anderson Arroyo Córdoba
- Date of birth: 27 September 1999 (age 27)
- Place of birth: Quibdó, Colombia
- Height: 1.76 m (5 ft 9 in)
- Positions: Right-back; centre-back

Team information
- Current team: Rubin Kazan
- Number: 12

Youth career
- Fortaleza CEIF

Senior career*
Years	Team	Apps	(Gls)
2015–2018	Fortaleza CEIF	14	(0)
2018–2024	Liverpool	0	(0)
2018	→ Mallorca B (loan)	14	(1)
2018–2019	→ Gent (loan)	0	(0)
2019–2020	→ Mladá Boleslav (loan)	2	(0)
2019–2020	→ Mladá Boleslav B (loan)	5	(0)
2020–2021	→ Salamanca (loan)	21	(0)
2021–2022	→ Mirandés (loan)	39	(0)
2022–2023	→ Alavés (loan)	17	(0)
2023–2024	→ Andorra (loan)	10	(0)
2024	→ Burgos (loan)	16	(1)
2024–2025	Burgos	39	(0)
2025–	Rubin Kazan	37	(4)

International career
2015	Colombia U17	8	(0)
2017	Colombia U20	8	(0)
2020	Colombia U23	2	(0)
- * Club domestic league appearances and goals as of 21 November 2026

Anderson Arroyo Córdoba (born 27 September 1999) is a Colombian professional footballer who plays as either a right-back or centre-back for Russian Premier League club Rubin Kazan.

== Club career ==
=== Fortaleza CEIF ===
Born in Quibdó, Arroyo finished his formation with Fortaleza C.E.I.F. He made his senior debut on 19 November 2015, coming on as a late substitute in a 3–1 Categoría Primera B home win over Deportivo Pereira, and he appeared in one more match during the year as his team achieved promotion.

Arroyo made 22 appearances during three seasons, and described his time at Fortaleza as "unforgettable".

=== Liverpool ===
In February 2018, Arroyo joined Liverpool.

==== Loans ====
Immediately after joining Liverpool, Arroyo was loaned to Mallorca on an 18-month deal. He was initially assigned to the B-team in Tercera División, and played in 12 matches for the remainder of the season. For the 2018–19 season, he was loaned to Belgian club Gent, where he joined fellow Liverpool loanee Taiwo Awoniyi.

On 24 September 2019, Arroyo joined Czech club Mladá Boleslav on loan for the 2019–20 season. He joined Salamanca on loan for the 2020–21 season.

On 9 July 2021, Arroyo joined Mirandés on loan for the season. On 9 July 2022, he joined Alavés on a season-long loan, as well as signing a contract extension with Liverpool.

On 18 July 2023, Arroyo joined Andorra on loan until the end of the season.

=== Burgos ===
On 26 January 2024, Arroyo was recalled from his loan with Andorra and was subsequently loaned out to fellow Segunda División side Burgos. On 6 July, he signed a permanent three-year deal with the club.

=== Rubin Kazan ===
On 10 September 2025, Arroyo signed a four-year contract with Russian Premier League club Rubin Kazan.

== Career statistics ==
=== Club ===
As of match played 21 November 2026.

Appearances and goals by club, season and competition
Club	Season	League			National cup		Other		Total	
Club	Season	Division	Apps	Goals	Apps	Goals	Apps	Goals	Apps	Goals
Fortaleza	2015	Primera B	2	0	—		—		2	0
Fortaleza	2016	Primera A	8	0	4	0	—		12	0
Fortaleza	2017	Primera B	4	0	4	0	—		8	0
Fortaleza	Total		14	0	8	0	0	0	22	0
Mallorca B (loan)	2017–18	Tercera División	13	0	—		—		13	0
Mallorca B (loan)	2018–19	Tercera División	1	1	—		—		1	1
Mallorca B (loan)	Total		14	1	0	0	0	0	14	1
Mladá Boleslav (loan)	2019–20	Czech First League	2	0	0	0	—		2	0
Mladá Boleslav B (loan)	2019–20	Bohemian Football League	5	0	—		—		5	0
Salamanca (loan)	2020–21	Segunda División B	21	0	—		—		21	0
Mirandes (loan)	2021–22	Segunda División	39	0	3	0	—		42	0
Alavés (loan)	2022–23	Segunda División	17	0	4	0	1 (Note: Appearance in promotion play-offs)	0	22	0
Andorra (loan)	2023–24	Segunda División	10	0	1	0	—		11	0
Burgos (loan)	2023–24	Segunda División	16	1	—		—		16	1
Burgos	2024–25	Segunda División	36	0	2	1	—		38	1
Burgos	2025–26	Segunda División	3	0	—		—		3	0
Burgos	Total		39	0	2	1	0	0	41	1
Rubin Kazan	2025–26	Russian Premier League	22	1	4	0	—		26	1
Rubin Kazan	2026–27	Russian Premier League	15	3	4	0	—		19	3
Rubin Kazan	Total		37	4	8	0	0	0	45	4
Career total			214	6	26	1	1	0	241	7

== Honours ==
Alavés

- Segunda División play-offs: 2023
