= Rubén Mesa =

Spanish footballer (born 1992)

Personal information
- Full name: Rubén Mesa Visiga
- Date of birth: 16 January 1992 (age 34)
- Place of birth: Badajoz, Spain
- Height: 1.82 m (6 ft 0 in)
- Position: Forward

Team information
- Current team: Minera
- Number: 9

Youth career
- Flecha Negrea

Senior career*
Years	Team	Apps	(Gls)
2011–2012	Badajoz	23	(5)
2012–2013	Rayo Vallecano B	10	(2)
2013	→ Alcalá (loan)	14	(1)
2013–2014	Atlético Madrid B	35	(10)
2014–2017	Recreativo	67	(8)
2017–2018	SS Reyes	19	(8)
2018–2019	Villarreal B	17	(2)
2019–2020	Rayo Majadahonda	27	(11)
2020–2021	Extremadura	37	(9)
2022	UCAM Murcia	20	(5)
2022–2023	Numancia	37	(8)
2023–2025	Estepona	47	(6)
2025–	Minera	48	(18)
- * Club domestic league appearances and goals as of 7 May 2026

Rubén Mesa Visiga (born 16 January 1992) is a Spanish footballer who plays as a forward for Segunda Federación club Minera.

== Club career ==
Born in Badajoz, Extremadura, Mesa started playing as a senior with CD Badajoz in the Segunda División B in 2011. On 27 June 2012 he moved to Rayo Vallecano, being assigned to the reserves also in the third level.

On 2 January 2013 Mesa was loaned to fellow league team RSD Alcalá, until June. After returning to Rayo he moved to neighbouring Atlético Madrid B. He scored 11 goals during the campaign, as they narrowly avoided relegation.

On 11 July 2014 Mesa signed a four-year deal with Recreativo de Huelva. On 23 August he made his professional debut, starting in a 0–0 home draw against Real Zaragoza in the Segunda División.

Mesa scored his first goal in the category on 13 December 2014, netting the last in a 2–4 home loss against UD Las Palmas. He left Recre in 2017, and subsequently represented third division sides UD San Sebastián de los Reyes, Villarreal CF B, CF Rayo Majadahonda and Extremadura UD.
