= La Palma del Condado =

- Municipality
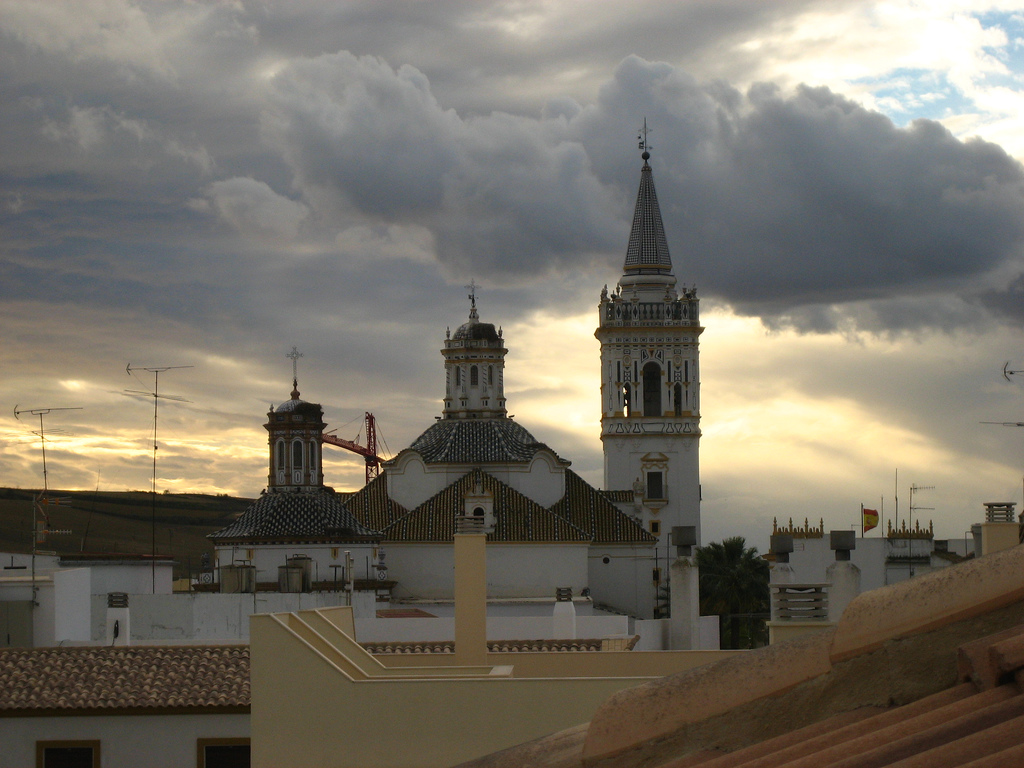

- Flag Coat of arms

- Location in Spain
- Coordinates: 37°23′3″N 6°33′6″W
- Country: Spain
- Autonomous Community: Andalusia
- Province: Huelva
- Comarca: El Condado

Government
  - Mayor: Manuel Garcia Felix

Area
  - Total: 61 km^{2} (24 sq mi)
- Elevation (AMSL): 93 m (305 ft)

Population (2025-01-01)
  - Total: 10,841
  - Density: 180/km^{2} (460/sq mi)
- Time zone: UTC+1 (CET)
  - Summer (DST): UTC+2 (CEST (GMT +2))
- Postal code: 21700
- Area code: +34 (Spain) + 959 (Huelva)
- Website: Town Hall

La Palma del Condado is a town and municipality located in the province of Huelva, Spain. According to the 2025 municipal register, it has a population of 10,841 inhabitants. Circuito Monteblanco (Monteblanco race circuit) is situated here, hosting motorsport and corporate events.

== Notable people ==
- Alejandro Alfaro, footballer
- Miguel Pardeza, footballer
- Curro Sánchez, footballer
- José Antonio Caro, footballer

== See also ==
- List of municipalities in Huelva
