= Filip Malbašić =

Serbian footballer (born 1992)

Personal information
- Date of birth: 18 November 1992 (age 33)
- Place of birth: Belgrade, FR Yugoslavia
- Height: 1.82 m (6 ft 0 in)
- Positions: Winger; forward

Youth career
- Radnički Beograd

Senior career*
Years	Team	Apps	(Gls)
2008–2010	Radnički Beograd	3	(0)
2010–2012	Rad	26	(2)
2012–2016	1899 Hoffenheim	0	(0)
2013–2014	→ Partizan (loan)	19	(2)
2014–2015	→ Lechia Gdańsk (loan)	3	(0)
2014–2015	→ Lechia Gdańsk II (loan)	6	(0)
2016–2017	Vojvodina	55	(21)
2017–2020	Tenerife	97	(19)
2020	→ Cádiz (loan)	7	(0)
2020–2021	Cádiz	28	(0)
2021–2022	Burgos	11	(0)
2022–2024	Vojvodina	49	(7)
2025	IMT	8	(1)
2025–2026	Newroz	4	(0)

International career
2010–2011	Serbia U19 (Note: Only official UEFA matches included)	7	(0)
2012–2014	Serbia U21	11	(2)
- * Club domestic league appearances and goals as of 15 June 2025

Filip Malbašić (Serbian Cyrillic: Филип Малбашић; born 18 November 1992) is a Serbian professional footballer who plays as a winger or forward.

== Club career ==
Malbašić started out at Radnički Beograd. He was promoted to the senior squad during the 2008–09 Serbian League Belgrade, as the club suffered relegation at the end of the season. In the summer of 2010, Malbašić moved to Rad, making his Serbian SuperLiga debut later that year, four days shy of his 18th birthday. He scored his first goal for Rad in a 1–4 home league loss to Partizan in March 2012.

In July 2012, Malbašić was transferred to German side 1899 Hoffenheim. He was unable to make any appearance in his debut season at the club. After failing to earn his place in the squad, Malbašić completed a season-long loan move to Partizan in June 2013. He was subsequently loaned to the Polish club Lechia Gdańsk in August 2014.

Six months before the expiration of his contract with 1899 Hoffenheim, Malbašić was transferred to Vojvodina, penning a two-and-a-half-year deal on 21 January 2016. He scored once in the league from 14 appearances until the end of the 2015–16 campaign. In the next 2016–17 season, Malbašić was the league's third-highest scorer with 16 goals, being selected in the competition's best eleven.

On 22 August 2017, Malbašić was transferred to Spanish club Tenerife on a four-year contract. On 30 January 2020, he was loaned to fellow Segunda División side Cádiz for six months, signing permanently until 2023 with the latter side on 22 July, after achieving promotion.

On 31 August 2021, Malbašić rescinded his contract with the Andalusians. The following 21 January, he moved to Burgos in the second division.

== International career ==
Malbašić represented Serbia at the 2011 UEFA European Under-19 Championship. He later played for the Serbia U21 side, between 2012 and 2014, scoring two goals.

== Career statistics ==
As of 25 February 2024

Appearances and goals by club, season and competition
Club	Season	League			National cup (Note: Includes Serbian Cup, Copa del Rey)		Continental		Total	
Club	Season	Division	Apps	Goals	Apps	Goals	Apps	Goals	Apps	Goals
Rad	2010–11	Serbian SuperLiga	4	0	0	0	—		4	0
Rad	2011–12	Serbian SuperLiga	22	2	0	0	2 (Note: Appearance(s) in UEFA Europa League)	0	24	2
Rad	Total		26	2	0	0	2	0	28	2
1899 Hoffenheim	2012–13	Bundesliga	0	0	0	0	—		0	0
Partizan (loan)	2013–14	Serbian SuperLiga	19	2	1	0	5 (Note: Three appearances in UEFA Champions League, two appearances in UEFA Europa League)	0	25	2
Lechia Gdańsk (loan)	2014–15	Ekstraklasa	3	0	0	0	—		3	0
Lechia Gdańsk II (loan)	2014–15	III liga, group D	6	0	—		—		6	0
Vojvodina	2015–16	Serbian SuperLiga	14	1	1	0	0	0	15	1
Vojvodina	2016–17	Serbian SuperLiga	35	16	4	2	8	2	47	20
Vojvodina	2017–18	Serbian SuperLiga	6	4	0	0	2	2	8	6
Vojvodina	Total		55	21	5	2	10	4	70	27
Tenerife	2017–18	Segunda División	37	9	4	0	—		41	9
Tenerife	2018–19	Segunda División	39	6	1	0	—		40	6
Tenerife	2019–20	Segunda División	21	4	1	0	—		22	4
Tenerife	Total		97	19	6	0	—		103	19
Cádiz (loan)	2019–20	Segunda División	7	0	0	0	—		7	0
Cádiz	2020–21	La Liga	28	0	3	1	—		31	1
Burgos	2021–22	Segunda División	11	0	0	0	—		11	0
Vojvodina	2022–23	Serbian SuperLiga	29	6	3	0	—		32	6
Vojvodina	2023–24	Serbian SuperLiga	20	1	2	0	1	0	23	1
Vojvodina	Total		49	7	5	0	1	0	55	7
Career total			300	51	20	3	18	4	338	58

== Honours ==
Individual

- Serbian SuperLiga Team of the Season: 2016–17
