= Edu Espiau =

Spanish footballer

Personal information
- Full name: Eduardo David Espiau Hernández
- Date of birth: 19 December 1994 (age 31)
- Place of birth: Las Palmas, Spain
- Height: 1.85 m (6 ft 1 in)
- Position: Forward

Team information
- Current team: Zaragoza

Youth career
- Huracán
- Universidad LP
- Puerto Las Palmas
- Estrella Roja
- Barrio Atlántico

Senior career*
Years	Team	Apps	(Gls)
2013–2016	Acodetti	?	(?)
2016–2017	Las Palmas C	?	(33)
2018–2019	Las Palmas B	43	(12)
2019–2021	Las Palmas	29	(2)
2019–2020	→ Villarreal B (loan)	27	(9)
2021–2023	Ponferradina	77	(12)
2023–2025	Burgos	78	(4)
2025–2026	Arka Gdynia	29	(6)
2026–	Zaragoza	0	(0)
- * Club domestic league appearances and goals as of 17:25, 25 May 2026 (UTC)

Eduardo David "Edu" Espiau Hernández (born 19 December 1994) is a Spanish professional footballer who plays as a forward for Primera Federación club Real Zaragoza.

== Club career ==
Espiau was born in Las Palmas, Canary Islands, and finished his formation with AD Barrio Atlántico. In 2013, he joined Acodetti CF in the regional leagues, and made his debut as a senior during the campaign.

In 2016, Espiau joined UD Las Palmas, initially assigned to the C-team, also in the lower leagues. He helped the side achieve promotion to Tercera División in his first season by scoring 23 goals, and added a further ten in his second before being promoted to the reserves in December 2017.

On 16 August 2018, Espiau was promoted to the main squad in Segunda División, but was demoted back to the B-side on 31 August. On 13 August of the following year, he was loaned to Villarreal CF B for the season.

Upon returning, Espiau was assigned back to the main squad, and made his professional debut on 12 September 2020 by starting in a 0–1 away loss against CD Leganés. He scored his first professional goal fourteen days later, netting the equalizer in a 2–2 away draw against Real Zaragoza.

On 1 July 2021, Espiau moved to fellow second division side SD Ponferradina. On 3 June 2023, after Ponfe's relegation, he signed a two-year deal with fellow league team Burgos CF.

On 16 July 2025, Espiau joined several compatriots at Polish Ekstraklasa club Arka Gdynia after signing a two-year deal. He was released by Arka after the 2025–26 season, and signed with Primera Federación side Real Zaragoza on 11 July 2026.
