= Saúl del Cerro =

Spanish footballer

Personal information
- Full name: Saúl del Cerro García
- Date of birth: 20 May 2004 (age 22)
- Place of birth: Burgos, Spain
- Height: 1.85 m (6 ft 1 in)
- Positions: Centre-back; defensive midfielder

Team information
- Current team: Burgos
- Number: 18

Youth career
- 2011–2021: Burgos

Senior career*
Years	Team	Apps	(Gls)
2021–2024	Burgos B	61	(2)
2021–	Burgos	15	(0)
2024–2025	→ Mérida (loan)	31	(0)
- * Club domestic league appearances and goals as of 7 November 2026

Saúl del Cerro García (born 20 May 2004) is a Spanish footballer who plays as either a centre-back or a defensive midfielder for Burgos CF.

== Club career ==
Born in Burgos, Castile and León, del Cerro was a Burgos CF youth graduate. On 23 October 2021, aged just 17, he made his senior debut with the reserves by coming on as a second-half substitute in a 0–3 Segunda División RFEF home loss against UD Logroñés B.

Del Cerro made his first-team debut on 14 December 2021, replacing fellow debutant Iván Serrano late into a 0–2 away loss against Real Zaragoza in the season's Copa del Rey. He scored his first senior goal on 12 February 2023, netting the B's third in a 4–3 away loss to Ourense CF.

Del Cerro made his Segunda División debut on 13 January 2024, replacing Fer Niño late into a 1–0 home win over Real Valladolid. On 8 July, he renewed his contract until 2027 and was promoted to the first team, but was loaned to Primera Federación side Mérida AD on 30 August.
