= Roberto Alarcón (footballer, born 1994) =

Spanish footballer

Personal information
- Full name: Roberto Alarcón González
- Date of birth: 14 April 1994 (age 32)
- Place of birth: Murcia, Spain
- Height: 1.78 m (5 ft 10 in)
- Position: Winger

Team information
- Current team: Minera
- Number: 7

Youth career
- Atlético Cabezo de Torres
- Murcia
- 2008–2011: Barcelona
- 2011–2013: Murcia

Senior career*
| Years | Team | Apps | (Gls) |
| 2013–2014 | Santa Pola | 22 | (10) |
| 2014–2016 | Murcia B | 33 | (14) |
| 2015–2016 | → La Hoya Lorca (loan) | 33 | (4) |
| 2016–2017 | Murcia | 28 | (3) |
| 2017–2018 | Alcoyano | 17 | (0) |
| 2018–2020 | Oviedo B | 55 | (9) |
| 2020–2022 | Burgos | 45 | (3) |
| 2022–2023 | Cultural Leonesa | 35 | (4) |
| 2023–2024 | Atlético Baleares | 26 | (2) |
| 2024–2025 | Avilés Industrial | 19 | (1) |
| 2025– | Minera | 27 | (3) |
- * Club domestic league appearances and goals as of 7 May 2026

Roberto Alarcón González (born 14 April 1994) is a Spanish footballer who plays mainly as a left winger for Segunda Federación club Minera.

== Club career ==
Born in Murcia, Alarcón began his career at local side CA Cabezo de Torres, and subsequently represented Real Murcia before joining FC Barcelona's La Masia in 2008, aged 14. He left Barça in 2011 and returned to Murcia, but signed for Elche CF in 2013 after finishing his formation; he was immediately assigned to farm team Santa Pola CF, in the regional leagues.

In 2014, Alarcón returned to Murcia and was assigned to the reserves in Tercera División. In August 2015, after scoring 14 goals for the B-side, he was loaned to Segunda División B side La Hoya Lorca CF, for one year.

Back to Murcia in July 2016, Alarcón was assigned to the main squad also in the third division. On 11 July of the following year, he moved to fellow league team CD Alcoyano.

On 10 August 2018, Alarcón signed for another reserve team, Real Oviedo Vetusta also in the third tier. On 17 January 2020, he moved to Burgos CF in the same category, and helped in their promotion to Segunda División after a 19-year absence in 2021.

Alarcón made his professional debut on 15 August 2021, coming on as a second-half substitute for Juanma García in a 0–1 away draw against Sporting de Gijón.
