= Miki Muñoz =

Spanish footballer

Miki
Personal information
- Full name: Miguel Muñoz Mora
- Date of birth: 13 April 1995 (age 31)
- Place of birth: Girona, Spain
- Height: 1.80 m (5 ft 11 in)
- Position: Midfielder

Youth career
- Blanes
- 2008–2009: Girona
- 2009–2014: Real Madrid

Senior career*
Years	Team	Apps	(Gls)
2014–2015	Real Madrid C	31	(2)
2015–2016	Hospitalet	29	(2)
2016–2017	Lleida Esportiu	26	(1)
2017–2019	Valencia B	57	(0)
2020–2024	Burgos	144	(6)
2024–2026	Asteras Tripolis	50	(1)
- * Club domestic league appearances and goals as of 14 June 2026

Miguel Muñoz Mora (born 13 April 1995), commonly known as Miki or sometimes Mumo, is a Spanish professional footballer who plays as a midfielder.

== Club career ==
Miki was born in Girona, Catalonia, and joined Real Madrid's La Fábrica in 2009, after representing Girona FC and CD Blanes. He made his senior debut with the former's C-team on 23 February 2014, coming on as a late substitute for Mariano Díaz in a 1–0 Segunda División B home win against Bilbao Athletic.

In 2015, after Real Madrid C was dissolved, Miki moved to third division side CE L'Hospitalet. He continued to appear in the category in the following years, representing Lleida Esportiu, Valencia CF Mestalla and Burgos CF; in 2021, he helped the latter in their promotion to Segunda División after a 19-year absence.

Miki made his professional debut on 15 August 2021, replacing Eneko Undabarrena in a 0–1 away draw against Sporting de Gijón.

== Career statistics ==
As of match played 7 July 2024

Club	Season	League			Cup		Continental		Other		Total	
Club	Season	Division	Apps	Goals	Apps	Goals	Apps	Goals	Apps	Goals	Apps	Goals
Hospitalet	2015–16	Segunda División B	29	2	0	0	—		—		29	2
Lleida Esportiu	2016–17	Segunda División B	26	1	2	0	—		—		28	1
Valencia B	2017–18	Segunda División B	30	0	—		—		—		30	0
Valencia B	2018–19	Segunda División B	27	0	—		—		—		27	0
Valencia B	Total		57	0	—		—		—		57	0
Burgos	2019–20	Segunda División B	8	1	0	0	—		—		8	1
Burgos	2020–21	Segunda División B	22	1	2	0	—		—		24	1
Burgos	2021–22	Segunda División	40	1	2	0	—		—		42	1
Burgos	2022–23	Segunda División	39	3	2	0	—		—		41	3
Burgos	2023–24	Segunda División	35	0	2	0	—		—		37	0
Burgos	Total		144	6	8	0	—		—		152	6
Career total			256	9	10	0	0	0	0	0	266	9
