= Estadio El Plantío =

Stadium in Bragos, Spain

Coordinates: 42°20′39″N 3°40′50″W

Estadio Municipal de El Plantío
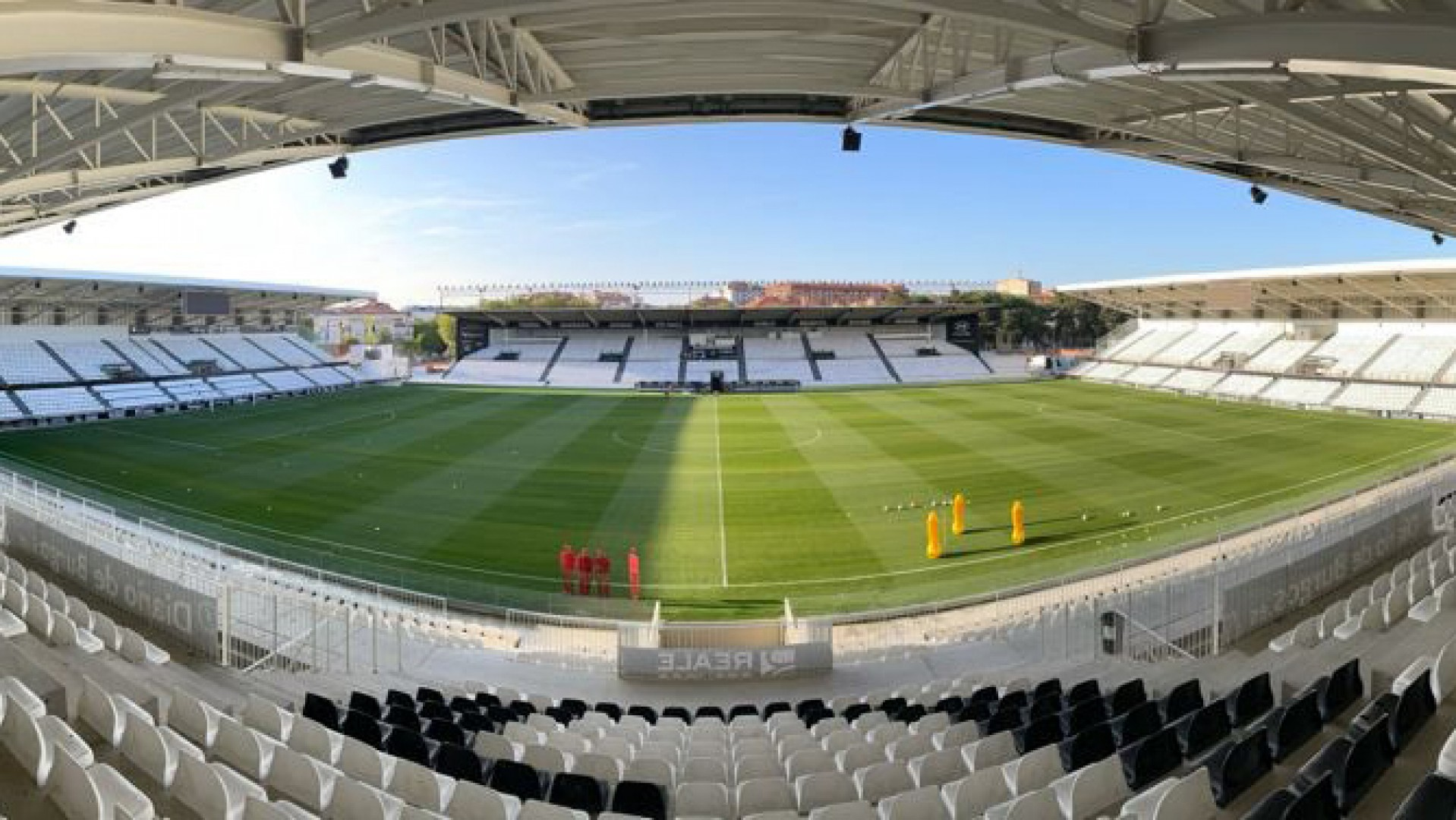
- Interactive map of Estadio Municipal de El Plantío
- Location: Burgos, Spain
- Capacity: 12,194
- Surface: Grass
- Field size: 105 m × 69 m (344 ft × 226 ft)

Construction
- Opened: 1964
- Renovated: 2018–present

Tenants
- Burgos CF; Spain national football team (selected matches)

Estadio Municipal de El Plantío is a stadium in Burgos, Spain. It is currently used for football matches and is the home stadium of Burgos CF. The stadium holds 12,194 spectators. The construction of the stadium started on 22 June 1963, a few months after the project presentation.

In March 2018 the reform of three of its four stands began.

== Gallery ==
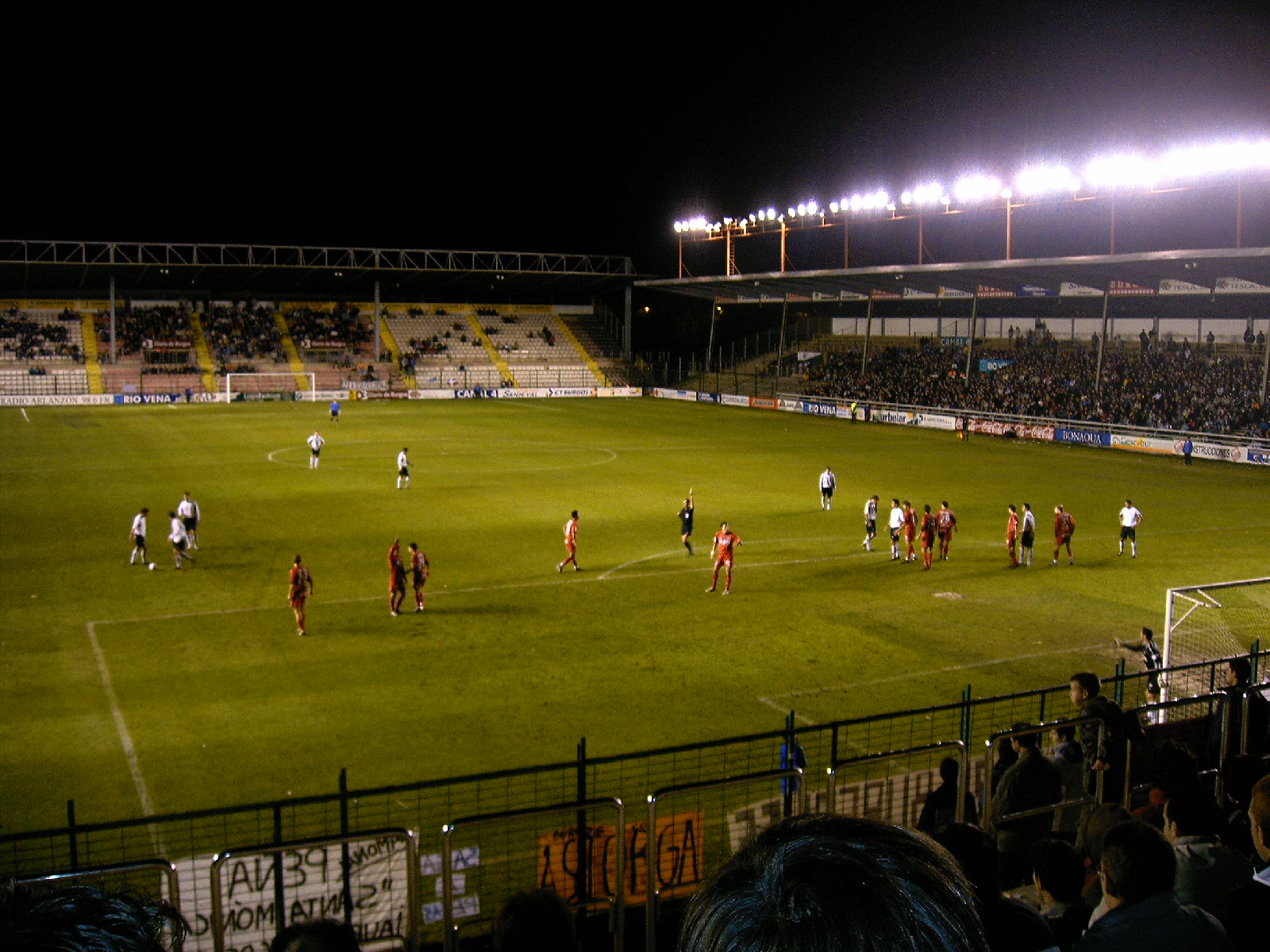
Burgos vs Real Sociedad in 2004.

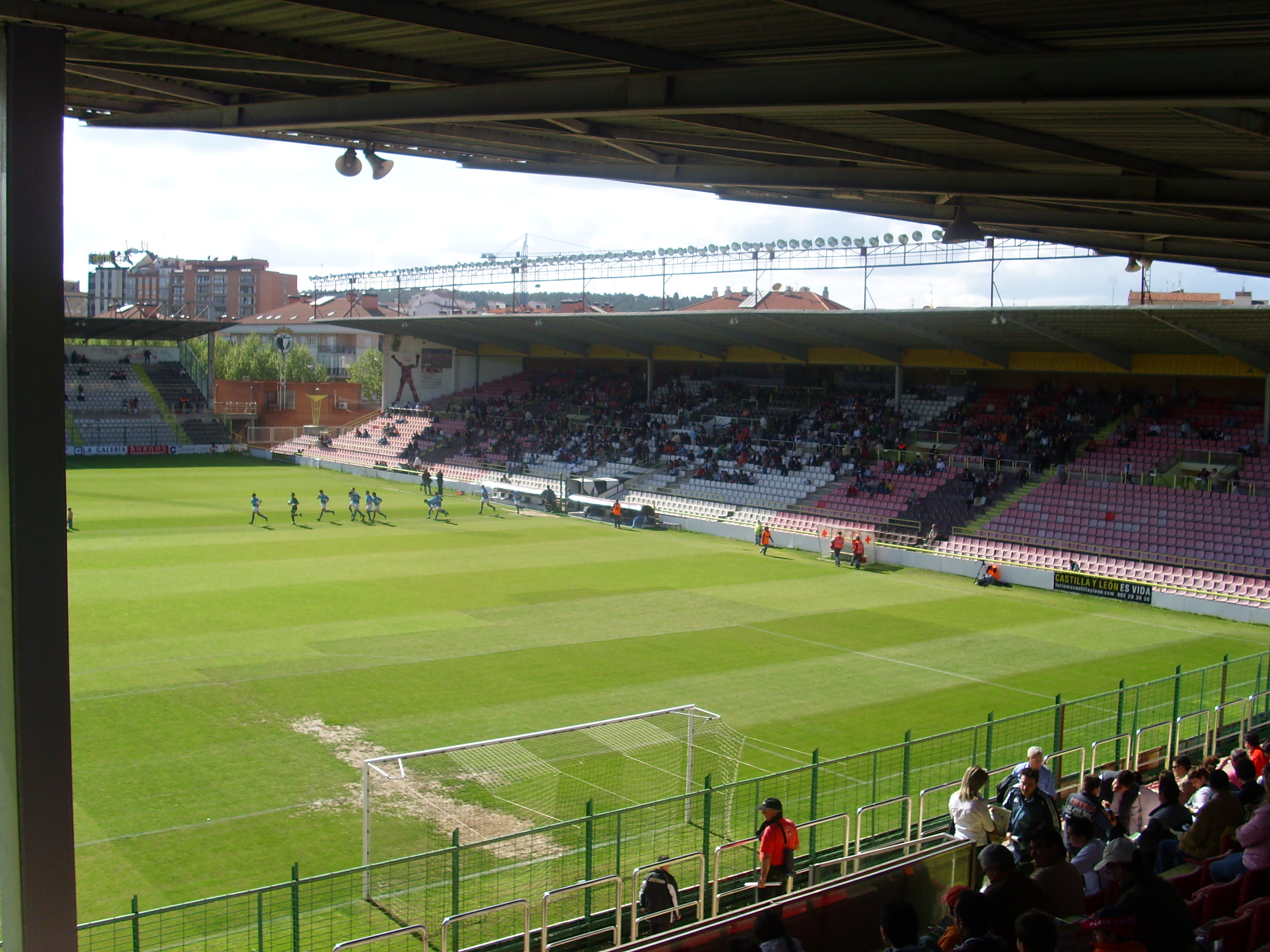
Burgos vs Oviedo in 2007.

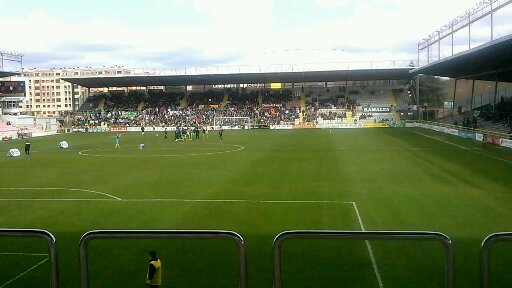
Burgos vs Racing Santander in 2016.
