= Iván Serrano =

Spanish footballer

Personal information
- Full name: Iván Serrano García
- Date of birth: 7 January 2001 (age 25)
- Place of birth: Avilés, Spain
- Height: 1.73 m (5 ft 8 in)
- Position: Left back

Team information
- Current team: Atlético Baleares
- Number: 3

Youth career
- Los Campos
- Bosco
- 2012–2015: Quirinal
- 2015–2019: Oviedo
- 2019–2020: Betis

Senior career*
Years	Team	Apps	(Gls)
2020–2022	Burgos B	51	(0)
2021–2023	Burgos	1	(0)
2022–2023	→ Linares (loan)	15	(0)
2023	→ Avilés (loan)	18	(1)
2023–2024	Avilés	32	(0)
2024–2025	Teruel	32	(0)
2025–	Atlético Baleares	23	(0)
- * Club domestic league appearances and goals as of 14 May 2026

Iván Serrano García (born 7 January 2001) is a Spanish footballer who plays as a left back for Segunda Federación club Atlético Baleares.

== Club career ==
Serrano was born in Avilés, Asturias, and played for local sides CD Los Campos, CD Bosco and CD Quirinal before joining Real Oviedo in 2015. On 24 August 2019, aged 18, he moved to Real Betis.

In 2020, Serrano joined Burgos CF and was assigned to the reserves in the Tercera División. He made his senior debut on 1 November, starting in a 0–2 away loss against Real Ávila CF.

Serrano made his first team debut on 2 May 2021, starting in a 0–1 loss at Unionistas de Salamanca CF in the Segunda División B. At the end of the campaign, both first and B-teams achieved promotion to the Segunda División and Segunda División RFEF respectively.

Serrano made his professional debut on 14 December 2021, starting in a 0–2 away loss against Real Zaragoza in the season's Copa del Rey. The following 23 August, he moved to Primera Federación side Linares Deportivo on a one-year loan deal.
