= Grego (footballer) =

Spanish footballer (born 1993)

Personal information
- Full name: Gregorio Sierra Pérez
- Date of birth: 5 March 1993 (age 33)
- Place of birth: Murcia, Spain
- Height: 1.86 m (6 ft 1 in)
- Positions: Centre back; defensive midfielder

Team information
- Current team: Burgos
- Number: 8

Youth career
- –2011: Murcia

Senior career*
Years	Team	Apps	(Gls)
2011–2012	Murcia B	12	(0)
2012–2013	Atlético Madrid C	19	(0)
2013–2014	Noja	5	(0)
2014	Mar Menor	10	(0)
2014–2015	Murcia B	26	(0)
2015–2016	La Hoya Lorca	23	(0)
2016–2017	Valencia B	33	(1)
2017–2019	Numancia	7	(0)
2019	UCAM Murcia	10	(0)
2019–2021	Sabadell	60	(1)
2021–2024	Burgos	83	(6)
2024–2025	Universitatea Craiova	8	(0)
2025–	Burgos	58	(2)
- * Club domestic league appearances and goals as of 6 June 2026

Gregorio Sierra Pérez (born 5 March 1993), commonly known as Grego, is a Spanish footballer who plays as either a centre back or defensive midfielder for Burgos CF.

== Club career ==
Grego was born in Murcia, and was a Real Murcia youth graduate. He made his senior debut with the reserves in 2011, in Tercera División.

In 2012 Grego moved to another reserve team, Atlético Madrid C also in the fourth tier. On 30 July of the following year he joined fellow league team SD Noja, but after being rarely used he terminated his contract and signed for Mar Menor CF in January 2014.

On 10 July 2015, after another one-year spell back at Murcia's B-side, Grego first arrived in Segunda División B, after agreeing to a contract with La Hoya Lorca CF. Roughly one year later, he joined fellow league side Valencia CF Mestalla.

On 28 June 2017, after missing out promotion in the play-offs, Grego signed a two-year contract with Segunda División club CD Numancia. He made his professional debut on 6 September, starting in a 1–0 away win against Real Oviedo, for the season's Copa del Rey.

On 23 January 2019, Grego agreed to a six-month contract with UCAM Murcia CF in the third division, after terminating his contract with Numancia. On 15 July, he moved to fellow league team CE Sabadell FC, being a regular starter as his side achieved promotion to the second tier.

On 31 July 2020, Grego renewed with the Arquelinats for a further campaign. On 6 July 2021, after the club's relegation, he joined Burgos CF also in the second division.

Grego scored his first professional goal on 3 October 2021, netting the winner in a 1–0 home success over CD Mirandés. On 3 July 2024, Burgos announced his departure as his contract had already expired.

On 3 July 2024, Grego moved abroad for the first time in his career, after agreeing to a one-year contract with Romanian side CS Universitatea Craiova. The following 21 January, he returned to his previous club Burgos on an 18-month deal.
