= Eneko Undabarrena =

Spanish footballer (born 1993)

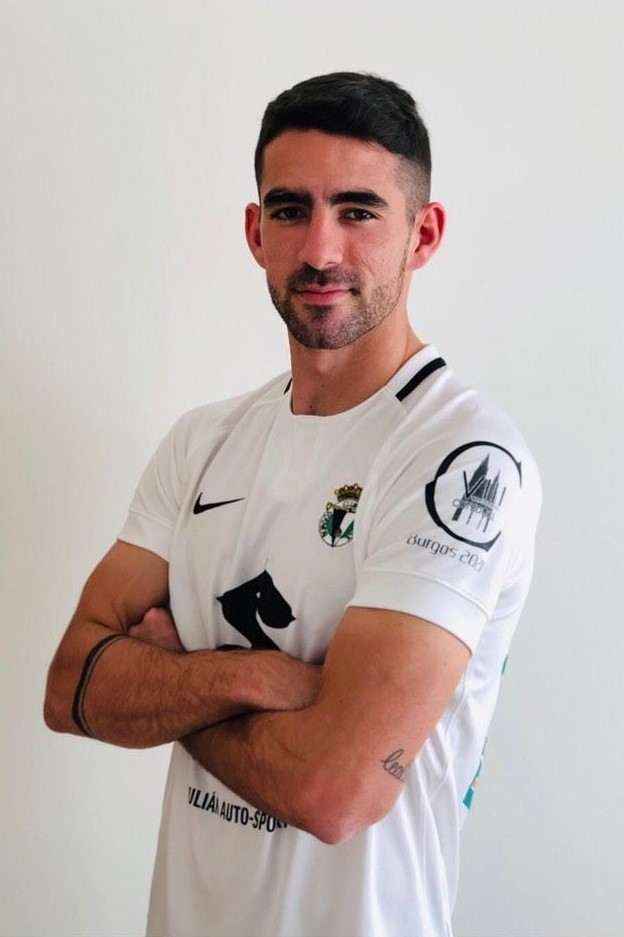

Personal information
- Full name: Eneko Undabarrena Ubillo
- Date of birth: 10 March 1993 (age 33)
- Place of birth: Bilbao, Spain
- Height: 1.85 m (6 ft 1 in)
- Position: Midfielder

Team information
- Current team: Ponferradina
- Number: 5

Youth career
- Santutxu

Senior career*
Years	Team	Apps	(Gls)
2012–2013	Santutxu	17	(0)
2013–2014	Somorrostro		
2014–2016	Amorebieta	57	(2)
2016–2018	Leioa	51	(4)
2018	Mirandés	16	(0)
2018–2022	Burgos	101	(3)
2022–2024	Intercity	68	(0)
2024–2025	Alcoyano	34	(1)
2025–	Ponferradina	33	(2)
- * Club domestic league appearances and goals as of 25 May 2026

Eneko Undabarrena Ubillo (born 10 March 1993) is a Spanish footballer who plays for Primera Federación club SD Ponferradina. Mainly a midfielder, he can also play as a centre-back.

== Club career ==
Born in Bilbao, Biscay, Basque Country, Undabarrena made his senior debut with local side Santutxu FC in 2012, in Tercera División. In 2014, after a year at JD Somorrostro in the regional leagues, he moved straight to Segunda División B with SD Amorebieta.

On 11 July 2016, Undabarrena signed for SD Leioa also in the third division. He agreed to a deal with fellow league team CD Mirandés on 8 January 2018, but moved to Burgos CF in the same category on 20 July, on a two-year contract.

Undabarrena became a regular starter for the Burgaleses, and helped in their promotion to Segunda División in 2021 as team captain with two goals in 25 appearances (play-offs included). He made his professional debut at the age of 28 on 15 August of that year, starting in a 0–1 away draw against Sporting de Gijón.

On 4 July 2022, Undabarrena signed a two-year deal with Primera Federación newcomers CF Intercity.

== Personal life ==
In 2012, while playing for Santutxu, Undabarrena was one of the chosen players of Nike's The Chance in his hometown. He is not related to fellow player Iker Undabarrena, who also plays as a midfielder.
