= José Antonio Caro (footballer, born 1994) =

Spanish footballer (born 1994)

Personal information
- Full name: José Antonio Caro Díaz
- Date of birth: 3 May 1994 (age 32)
- Place of birth: La Palma del Condado, Spain
- Height: 1.94 m (6 ft 4 in)
- Position: Goalkeeper

Team information
- Current team: Las Palmas
- Number: 13

Youth career
- Siempre Alegres
- 2006–2011: Sevilla

Senior career*
Years	Team	Apps	(Gls)
2011–2014	Sevilla C	35	(0)
2014–2018	Sevilla B	86	(0)
2018–2022	Valladolid	3	(0)
2018–2019	→ Albacete (loan)	2	(0)
2019–2020	→ Ponferradina (loan)	11	(0)
2020–2021	→ Ponferradina (loan)	39	(0)
2021–2022	→ Burgos (loan)	15	(0)
2022–2024	Burgos	82	(0)
2024–2025	Cádiz	5	(0)
2025–	Las Palmas	13	(0)
- * Club domestic league appearances and goals as of 23:52, 28 October 2026 (UTC)

José Antonio Caro Díaz (born 3 May 1994), sometimes known as Churripi, is a Spanish professional footballer who plays as a goalkeeper for Segunda División club Las Palmas.

== Club career ==
=== Sevilla ===
Born in La Palma del Condado, Province of Huelva, Andalusia, Caro played youth football with Sevilla FC. He made his senior debut with the C team on 23 September 2012, in a 1–0 Tercera División away win against CA Antoniano.

Caro first appeared for the reserves on 14 September 2014, playing the entire 1–0 home victory over CD El Palo in the Segunda División B. On 11 November he signed a new contract with the club, running until 2016.

On 26 April 2016, Caro further extended his link, signing until 2017. On 26 June, during the play-offs final against Lleida Esportiu, he converted the decisive penalty in the shootout as his side achieved promotion to Segunda División.

Caro made his professional debut on 2 September 2016, in a 1–1 home draw with UCAM Murcia CF. A regular starter during the season, he lost his position to Juan Soriano the following campaign as the latter ended in relegation.

=== Valladolid ===
On 28 July 2018, Caro signed a three-year contract with La Liga club Real Valladolid, and was immediately loaned to Albacete Balompié from the second division for one year. On 16 August of the following year, he moved to SD Ponferradina also in a temporary deal.

Caro shared the starting spot with Manu García during his spell at the Estadio El Toralín, being recalled by Valladolid on 12 January 2020. He made his debut in the Spanish top tier on 20 June, in a 1–0 loss at Atlético Madrid.

On 22 August 2020, Caro returned to Ponferradina on loan for the season. He received the first red card of his career on 30 May 2021, while he was on the bench of the 2–2 home draw with RCD Mallorca.

=== Burgos ===
Caro joined fellow second-tier Burgos CF in August 2021, also on loan. On 13 July 2022, he agreed to a permanent two-year contract as a free agent.

Caro was named Player of the Month for September 2022, after conceding no goals in the first seven matches.

=== Cádiz ===
On 6 July 2024, Caro signed a two-year deal with Cádiz CF, recently relegated to the second division. In August 2025, having played second-fiddle to David Gil, he terminated his contract.

=== Las Palmas ===
On 11 August 2025, Caro agreed to a one-year contract at UD Las Palmas. He signed a two-year extension on 30 June 2026.

== Honours ==
Individual

- Segunda División Player of the Month: September 2022
