= Curro Sánchez =

Spanish footballer

Personal information
- Full name: Francisco José Sánchez Rodríguez
- Date of birth: 3 January 1996 (age 30)
- Place of birth: La Palma del Condado, Spain
- Height: 1.74 m (5 ft 9 in)
- Position: Attacking midfielder

Team information
- Current team: Burgos
- Number: 16

Youth career
- Siempre Alegres
- 2007–2014: Sevilla

Senior career*
Years	Team	Apps	(Gls)
2013–2019	Sevilla B	141	(21)
2015–2016	Sevilla	4	(0)
2019–2020	Numancia	34	(13)
2020–2021	Ponferradina	36	(5)
2021–2022	Almería	37	(2)
2022–	Burgos	148	(36)

International career
2012	Spain U16	1	(0)
2013	Spain U17	4	(0)
2014	Spain U18	2	(2)
2013–2014	Spain U19	9	(2)
- * Club domestic league appearances and goals as of 6 June 2026

Francisco José "Curro" Sánchez Rodríguez (born 3 January 1996) is a Spanish footballer who plays as an attacking midfielder for Burgos CF.

== Club career ==
Born in La Palma del Condado, Huelva, Andalusia, Curro joined Sevilla FC's youth setup in 2007, aged 11. He made his debuts as a senior in the 2012–13 campaign, in Segunda División B.

On 5 February 2015, Curro renewed his contract, signing a deal until 2017. He made his first team debut on 2 December, starting in a 3–0 away win against UD Logroñés, for the season's Copa del Rey.

Curro made his La Liga debut on 17 April 2016, coming on as a second-half substitute for José Antonio Reyes in a 1–1 home draw against Deportivo de La Coruña. He scored his first goal as a professional on 21 August, netting the first in the B-team's 3–3 Segunda División home draw against Girona FC.

On 16 July 2019, Curro moved to second division side CD Numancia on a two-year deal. He scored a career-best 13 goals for the club during the campaign, but was unable to avoid team relegation.

On 9 September 2020, Curro signed a one-year contract with SD Ponferradina, still in the second division. The following 10 July, he agreed to a three-year deal with fellow league team UD Almería.

Curro featured regularly for the Rojiblancos during the season, as his side achieved promotion to the top tier as champions. On 1 September 2022, however, he terminated his contract, and signed a two-year deal with Burgos CF in the second division two days later.

== Career statistics ==
=== Club ===
As of 21 August 2020

Club	Season	League			Cup		Europe		Total	
Club	Season	Division	Apps	Goals	Apps	Goals	Apps	Goals	Apps	Goals
Sevilla	2015–16	La Liga	4	0	2	0	—		6	0
Sevilla	2016–17	La Liga	0	0	0	0	—		0	0
Sevilla	2017–18	La Liga	0	0	0	0	—		0	0
Sevilla	2018–19	La Liga	0	0	0	0	—		0	0
Sevilla	Total		4	0	2	0	—		6	0
Numancia	2019–20	Segunda División	34	13	0	0	—		34	13
Numancia	Total		34	13	0	0	—		34	13
Ponferradina	2020–21	Segunda División	36	5	1	0	—		37	5
Ponferradina	Total		36	5	1	0	—		37	5
Almeria	2021–22	Segunda División	35	2	2	0	—		37	2
Almeria	2022–23	La Liga	2	0	0	0	—		2	0
Almeria	Total		37	2	2	0	—		39	2
Burgos	2022–23	Segunda División	34	9	2	0	—		36	9
Burgos	2023–24	Segunda División	41	15	2	0	—		43	15
Burgos	2024–25	Segunda División	35	6	0	0	—		35	6
Burgos	2025–26	Segunda División	33	6	1	0	—		33	6
Burgos	Total		143	36	5	0	—		148	36
Career total			254	56	10	0	0	0	264	56
