= 2022–23 Albacete Balompié season =

Albacete Balompié
2022–23 season
- President: Georges Kabchi
- Head coach: Rubén Albés
- Stadium: Estadio Carlos Belmonte
- Segunda División: 6th
- Copa del Rey: Second round
Home colours	Away colours
- All statistics correct as of 29 January 2023.

The 2022–23 season is the 83rd season in the history of Albacete Balompié and their first season back in the second division. The club are participating in Segunda División and the Copa del Rey.

== Players ==
As of 31 January 2023

Note: Flags indicate national team as defined under FIFA eligibility rules; some limited exceptions apply. Players may hold more than one non-FIFA nationality.

No.	Pos.	Nation	Player
1	GK	ESP	Bernabé Barragán (captain)
2	DF	CMR	Mohammed Djetei
3	MF	ESP	Juan Antonio Ros
4	DF	ESP	Javi Jiménez
5	MF	ESP	Maikel Mesa
6	DF	FRA	Flavien Enzo Boyomo
7	FW	ESP	Juanma García
8	MF	ESP	Fran Álvarez
9	FW	BEL	Andy Kawaya
10	FW	ESP	Manu Fuster
11	FW	VEN	Jovanny Bolívar
12	FW	ESP	Higinio Marín
13	GK	ESP	Diego Altube
14	MF	ESP	Sergi Maestre

No.	Pos.	Nation	Player
15	MF	ESP	Javi Martínez (on loan from Osasuna)
16	FW	BEL	Jonathan Dubasin
17	DF	ESP	Julio Alonso
18	MF	ESP	Riki Rodríguez
19	MF	ESP	Lander Olaetxea
20	DF	ISL	Diegui
21	MF	POR	Tomás Reymão
22	DF	ESP	Carlos Isaac
23	DF	ESP	Álvaro Rodríguez
24	DF	ESP	Cristian Glauder
26	DF	ESP	Juan María Alcedo
27	DF	GHA	Emmanuel Attipoe
29	MF	ESP	Rodri Alonso (on loan from Villarreal)
—	FW	ESP	Dani Escriche (on loan from Huesca)

=== Reserve team ===
Note: Flags indicate national team as defined under FIFA eligibility rules; some limited exceptions apply. Players may hold more than one non-FIFA nationality.

No.	Pos.	Nation	Player
28	GK	ESP	Raúl Valdés
30	FW	ESP	Javi Vargas
31	DF	ESP	Borja Marchante
32	FW	ESP	Alex Willy

No.	Pos.	Nation	Player
34	FW	ALG	Karim Chaban
35	MF	ESP	Luis Roldán
36	MF	ESP	Alonso Chillerón

=== Out on loan ===
Note: Flags indicate national team as defined under FIFA eligibility rules; some limited exceptions apply. Players may hold more than one non-FIFA nationality.

No.	Pos.	Nation	Player
—	MF	ESP	Eric Montes (at Gimnàstic until 30 June 2023)
—	MF	ESP	Marc Llinares (at Osasuna B until 30 June 2023)

No.	Pos.	Nation	Player
—	MF	ESP	Sergi García (at Sabadell until 30 June 2023)
—	FW	ESP	Dani González (at Atlético Madrid B until 30 June 2023)

== Transfers ==
=== In ===
Date	Player	From	Type	Fee	Ref
7 July 2022	(Spain) Juan María Alcedo	Sevilla Atlético	Transfer	Undisclosed	
18 July 2022	(Spain) Diego Altube	Real Madrid	Transfer	Undisclosed	
19 July 2022	(Belgium) Jonathan Dubasin	Girona	Transfer	Undisclosed	
19 July 2022	(Spain) Álvaro Rodríguez	Burgos	Transfer	Undisclosed	
23 July 2022	(Spain) Juanma	Burgos	Transfer	Undisclosed	
23 July 2022	(Portugal) Tomás Reymão	(Portugal) Boavista	Transfer	Undisclosed	
25 July 2022	(Spain) Maikel Mesa	Las Palmas	Transfer	Free	
25 July 2022	(Spain) Lander Olaetxea	Amorebieta	Transfer	Undisclosed	
25 July 2022	(Spain) Juan Antonio Ros	Lugo	Transfer	Undisclosed	
27 July 2022	(Spain) Higinio	(Bulgaria) Ludogorets Razgrad	Transfer	Undisclosed	
31 August 2022	(Spain) Antonio Glauder	Eibar	Transfer	Undisclosed	
1 September 2022	(Spain) Javi Martínez	Osasuna	Loan		

=== Out ===
Date	Player	To	Type	Fee	Ref
23 June 2022	(Cameroon) Jean Jules	(Poland) Górnik Zabrze	Transfer	Undisclosed	
30 June 2022	(Uruguay) Emiliano Gómez	(Italy) Sassuolo	Loan return		
30 June 2022	(Spain) Alberto Jiménez	Tenerife	Loan return		
30 June 2022	(Spain) Kike Márquez	Released			
30 June 2022	(Venezuela) Yaimil Medina	Released			
30 June 2022	(Serbia) Dragan Rosić	Almería	Loan return		
30 June 2022	(Spain) Jordi Sánchez	Released			
21 July 2022	(Spain) Rafa Gálvez	Released			
29 July 2022	(Spain) Andreu Arasa	Released			
29 July 2022	(Spain) Rubén Cantero	Barcelona Juvenil	Loan		
22 August 2022	(Peru) Jeisson Martínez	Released			
23 August 2022	(Spain) Eric Montes	Gimnàstic Tarragona	Loan		
1 September 2022	(Spain) Sergi García	Sabadell	Loan		

== Pre-season and friendlies ==
Win Draw Loss Fixtures

21 July 2022 Friendly	Albacete	1–2	Valencia B	Albacete, Spain
19:30 CEST (UTC+2)	Fuster 9'; (red card) 89'	Report	Marí 7'; López 58'	Stadium: Estadio Carlos Belmonte

24 July 2022 Friendly	Albacete	2–1	UCAM	Albacete, Spain
22:15 CEST (UTC+2)	Fuster 17'; Dubasin 42' (pen.)	Report	(red card) 42'; Chuma 87'	Stadium: Estadio Carlos Belmonte

27 July 2022 Friendly	Albacete	4–2	Rayo Majadahonda	Albacete, Spain
19:00 CEST (UTC+2)	Martínez 17'; Fuster 33'; Valcarcel 47'; Willy 87'	Report	Garcia 78'; Alayeto 80'	Stadium: Estadio Carlos Belmonte

30 July 2022 Friendly	Leganés	0–0	Albacete	Leganés, Spain
19:30 CEST (UTC+2)	Avilés (yellow card) 60'; Boyomo (yellow card) 24'	Report		Stadium: Estadio Municipal de Butarque

4 August 2022 Friendly	Eldense	1–1	Albacete	Elda, Spain
19:00 CEST (UTC+2)	Ramis Luque 77' (pen.)	Report	Fuster 50'	Stadium: Nuevo Pepico Amat

7 August 2022 Friendly	Albacete	1–0	Getafe	Albacete, Spain
19:00 CEST (UTC+2)	(yellow card) 43'; Marín 58'; Boyomo (yellow card) 72'	Report	(yellow card) 24'; (yellow card) 36'; (yellow card) 56'; Duarte (yellow card) 79'; (yellow card) 84'	Stadium: Estadio Carlos Belmonte

8 August 2022 Friendly	Albacete	1–0	Socuéllamos	Albacete, Spain
19:00 CEST (UTC+2)	Dubasin 44'	Report		Stadium: Estadio Carlos Belmonte

== Competitions ==
=== Overall record ===
Competition	First match	Last match	Starting round	Final position	Record							
Competition	First match	Last match	Starting round	Final position	Pld	W	D	L	GF	GA	GD	Win %
Segunda División	15 August 2022	27 May 2023	Matchday 1	6th	42	17	16	9	58	47	+11	40.48
Segunda División promotion play-offs	3 June 2023	7 June 2023	Semi-finals	Semi-finals	2	0	0	2	1	6	−5	0.00
Copa del Rey	12 November 2022	21 December 2022	Second round	Third round	2	1	0	1	3	0	+3	50.00
Total					46	18	16	12	62	53	+9	39.13

Last updated: 7 June 2023

=== Segunda División ===
==== League table ====
Pos	Team	Pld	W	D	L	GF	GA	GD	Pts	Qualification or relegation
4	Alavés (O, P)	42	19	14	9	47	33	+14	71 (Note: Alavés finished ahead of Eibar on head-to-head points: Eibar 0–0 Alavés, Alavés 2–0 Eibar.)	Qualification for promotion play-offs
5	Eibar	42	19	14	9	45	36	+9	71	Qualification for promotion play-offs
6	Albacete	42	17	16	9	58	47	+11	67	Qualification for promotion play-offs
7	Andorra	42	16	11	15	47	37	+10	59 (Note: Andorra finished ahead of Oviedo on head-to-head points: Oviedo 0–1 Andorra, Andorra 3–1 Oviedo.)	
8	Oviedo	42	16	11	15	34	35	−1	59	

Source: LaLiga SmartBank
Rules for classification: 1) points; 2) head-to-head points; 3) head-to-head goal difference; 4) goal difference; 5) number of goals scored
(O) Play-off winners; (P) Promoted
Notes:

Notes

1. Reserve teams are not eligible for promotion to the same league as the first team.

==== Results summary ====
Overall								Home						Away					
Pld	W	D	L	GF	GA	GD	Pts	W	D	L	GF	GA	GD	W	D	L	GF	GA	GD
42	17	16	9	58	47	+11	67	10	7	4	30	19	+11	7	9	5	28	28	0

Last updated: June 2023.
Source: LaLiga SmartBank

==== Results by round ====
Round	1	2	3	4	5	6	7	8	9	10	11	12	13	14	15	16	17	18	19	20	21	22	23	24	25	26	27	28	29	30	31	32	33	34	35	36	37	38	39	40	41	42
Ground	A	H	H	A	A	H	H	A	H	A	H	A	H	A	H	A	H	A	H	A	H	A	H	A	H	A	H	A	A	H	A	H	A	H	A	H	A	H	A	H	A	H
Result	W	D	W	W	L	L	D	W	D	D	W	D	D	D	L	L	W	L	D	W	W	D	W	W	W	L	W	D	D	W	D	L	D	L	L	W	W	D	W	D	D	W
Position	4	8	5	1	4	8	9	5	7	7	5	6	8	8	9	12	9	10	13	8	7	8	6	6	5	6	6	6	6	6	6	6	6	6	7	6	6	6	6	6	6	6

Updated to match(es) played on 27 May 2023. Source: LaLiga SmartBank
A = Away; H = Home; W = Win; D = Draw; L = Loss

==== Matches ====
15 August 2022 1	Lugo	1–2	Albacete	Lugo
19:30 CEST (UTC+2)	Barreiro 17' (pen.); Juanpe (yellow card) 53'; Calavera (yellow card) 56'; Lozano (yellow card) 78'; Torres (yellow card) 80'	Report	Djetel (yellow card) 16'; Marin 43'; Olaetxea (yellow card) 72'; Maikel 82' (pen.); Dubasin (yellow card) 90+5'	Stadium: Estadio Anxo Carro; Attendance: 2,805; Referee: Reig S. A.

20 August 2022 2	Albacete	0–0	Burgos	Albacete
19:30 CEST (UTC+2)	Olaetxea (yellow card) 19'; Alonso (yellow card) 20'; Olaetxea (yellow card) 19' (red card)	Report	Sierra (yellow card) 23'; Aitor Cordoba (yellow card) 76'	Stadium: Estadio Carlos Belmonte; Attendance: 7,434; Referee: Busquets Ferrer M.

26 August 2022 3	Albacete	2–1	Huesca	Albacete
20:00 CEST (UTC+2)	Garcia 17'; Rodriguez (yellow card) 35'; Boyomo (yellow card) 58'; Olaetxea 90+6'	Report	Kante (yellow card) 16'; Timor (yellow card) 41'; Pulido (red card) 60'; Juan Carlos 84' (pen.)	Stadium: Estadio Carlos Belmonte; Attendance: 11,329; Referee: Vega A. C.

9 September 2022 4	Málaga	1–2	Albacete	Málaga
16:15 CEST (UTC+2)	Escassi 18'; Enriquez (yellow card) 34'; N'Diaye (yellow card) 48'	Report	Marin 5'; Fuster 7'; Boyomo (yellow card) 20'; Marin (yellow card) 45+1'; Maikel (yellow card) 62'; Olaetxea (yellow card) 68'; Barragan (yellow card) 85'; Dubasin (yellow card) 90+3'	Stadium: Estadio La Rosaleda; Attendance: 18,364; Referee: Gorostegui Fernandez A.

10 September 2022 5	Cartagena	2–1	Albacete	Cartagena
18:30 CEST (UTC+2)	Calero (yellow card) 44'; Rico 48'; Arribas 68'; Feuillassier (yellow card) 72'; Sangalli (yellow card) 81'	Report	Olaetxea (yellow card) 45+2'; Dubasin 70'	Stadium: Estadio Cartagonova; Attendance: 8,493; Referee: Trujillo Suarez D.

18 September 2022 6	Albacete	0–1	Ponferradina	Albacete
21:00 CEST (UTC+2)	Barragan (yellow card) 45+1'; Rodriguez (red card) 74'; Alonso (yellow card) 90+5'	Report	Lacerda (yellow card) 19'; Jose Amo (yellow card) 30'; Pascanu (yellow card) 33'; Ojeda (yellow card) 45+1'; Nwakali (yellow card) 63'; Adot Barandiaran (yellow card) 77'; Espiau Hernandez 90+1'	Stadium: Estadio Carlos Belmonte; Attendance: 7,026; Referee: Moreno A.

25 September 2022 7	Albacete	1–1	Andorra	Albacete
18:30 CEST (UTC+2)	Maikel 54' (pen.); Rodriguez Perez (yellow card) 90+2'	Report	Martinez (red card) 27'; Aguado Pallares (yellow card) 48'; Altimira (yellow card) 64'; Bakis (yellow card) 76'; Bakis 90+3' (pen.)	Stadium: Estadio Carlos Belmonte; Attendance: 6,223; Referee: Alvendiz L.

2 October 2022 8	Leganés	1–2	Albacete	Leganés
16:15 CEST (UTC+2)	Fede 7' (pen.); Pardo (yellow card) 32'; Fede (yellow card) 41'; Durmisi (yellow card) 64'; Nyom (yellow card) 82'	Report	Dubasin 51'; Dubasin 53'	Stadium: Estadio Municipal de Butarque; Attendance: 7,623; Referee: Barrera R.

9 October 2022 9	Albacete	1–1	Tenerife	Albacete
18:30 CEST (UTC+2)	Maikel (red card) 43'; Garcia (yellow card) 55'; Fuster 65'	Report	Nacho (yellow card) 51'; Garces 70'	Stadium: Estadio Carlos Belmonte; Attendance: 9,344; Referee: Gonzalez Esteban J. A.

12 October 2022 10	Alavés	0–0	Albacete	Vitoria-Gasteiz
18:30 CEST (UTC+2)	Moya (yellow card) 31'; Sevilla (yellow card) 45+2'; Benavidez (yellow card) 90+2'; de la Fuente (yellow card) 90+4'	Report	Rodriguez Perez (yellow card) 33'; Rodriguez (yellow card) 49'; Antonio Cristian (yellow card) 64'; Marin (yellow card) 90+1'	Stadium: Mendizorrotza; Attendance: 13,890; Referee: Maeso F.

15 October 2022 11	Albacete	1–0	Real Oviedo	Albacete
21:00 CEST (UTC+2)	Rodriguez (yellow card) 69'; Rodriguez Perez (yellow card) 81'; Kawaya 82'	Report	Mier (yellow card) 18'; Rama (yellow card) 54'; Luengo (yellow card) 65'; Tarin (yellow card) 68'	Stadium: Estadio Carlos Belmonte; Attendance: 8,123; Referee: Garcia V.

23 October 2022 12	Eibar	1–1	Albacete	Eibar
18:30 CEST (UTC+2)	Pereira (yellow card) 28'; Corpas 45+2' (pen.); Berrocal (yellow card) 48'; Tejero (yellow card) 50'; Venancio (yellow card) 50'	Report	Maikel 31' (pen.); Olaetxea (yellow card) 45+1'; Boyomo (yellow card) 74'; Fuster (yellow card) 80'	Stadium: Ipurua Municipal Stadium; Attendance: 5,417; Referee: Toca Lopez J.

30 October 2022 13	Albacete	0–0	Villarreal B	Albacete
22:00 CEST (UTC+2)	Alvarez (yellow card) 90+1'	Report	Miguel (yellow card) 14'; Rodri (yellow card) 67'	Stadium: Estadio Carlos Belmonte; Referee: Galvez Rascon D.

3 November 2022 14	Gijón	2–2	Albacete	Gijón
20:00 CEST (UTC+2)	Campuzano 18'; Rivera (yellow card) 40'; Milovanovic (yellow card) 76'; Cristo 80'; Rosas (yellow card) 90+3'	Report	Dubasin 28'; Rodriguez Perez 55'; Boyomo (yellow card) 59'; Rodriguez (yellow card) 87'; Martinez (yellow card) 88'; Dubasin (yellow card) 90'	Stadium: El Molinón; Attendance: 14,940; Referee: Busquets Ferrer M.

6 November 2022 15	Albacete	2–3	Levante	Albacete
21:00 CEST (UTC+2)	Barragan (yellow card) 36'; Rodriguez Perez (yellow card) 38'; Olaetxea (yellow card) 40'; Marin (yellow card) 42'; Marin 45+2'; Rodriguez Perez 64'	Report	Ibanez 2'; Ibanez (yellow card) 32'; Bouldini (yellow card) 36'; Campana 54' (pen.); Bouldini 73'; Munoz (yellow card) 82'; de Frutos (yellow card) 90+5'	Stadium: Estadio Carlos Belmonte; Attendance: 9,391; Referee: Vega A. C.

18 November 2022 16	Granada	4–0	Albacete	Granada
21:00 CEST (UTC+2)	Puertas (yellow card) 24'; Miquel (yellow card) 45' Callejon 53' Diaz (yellow card) 58' Sanchez 71' Zaragoza 78' Antonio Cristian 87' (o.g.)	Report	Boyomo (red card) 9' Alonso (yellow card) 34' Djetel (yellow card) 35' Rodriguez Perez (red card) 61'	Stadium: Nuevo Estadio de Los Cármenes; Attendance: 13,072; Referee: Moreno A.

26 November 2022 17	Albacete	2–1	Racing Santander	Albacete
18:30 CEST (UTC+2)	Maestre (yellow card) 29' Maikel 34' Djetel (yellow card) 43' Antonio Cristian (yellow card) 58' Maikel (yellow card) 73' Alcedo 76' Martinez (yellow card) 90+2'	Report	Fausto (yellow card) 40' Vicente 60' Fausto (yellow card) 62' (red card) Parera (yellow card) 69' Sanchez (yellow card) 74' Aldasoro (red card) 90+4'	Stadium: Estadio Carlos Belmonte; Attendance: 8,094; Referee: Reig S.

3 December 2022 18	Mirandés	4–2	Albacete	Miranda de Ebro
18:30 CEST (UTC+2)	Lopez (yellow card) 25' Oscar Pinchi 34' Raul 37' Lopez 41' Gelabert Pina (yellow card) 43' Alex Martin (yellow card) 45+1' Oscar Pinchi 62' Barbu (yellow card) 80'	Report	Rodriguez 5' Marin (yellow card) 27' Marin 86' Boyomo (yellow card) 89'	Stadium: Estadio Municipal de Anduva; Attendance: 2,398; Referee: Quintero A.

6 December 2022 19	Albacete	0–0	Zaragoza	Albacete
21:00 CEST (UTC+2)		Report	Jair (yellow card) 21' Molina (yellow card) 82'	Stadium: Estadio Carlos Belmonte; Attendance: 5,790; Referee: Barrera R.

11 December 2022 20	Las Palmas	1–2	Albacete	Las Palmas
21:00 CEST (UTC+2)	Moleiro (yellow card) 31' Pejino 52' Celmente (yellow card) 78' Coco (yellow card) 82'	Report	Fuster 14' Rodriguez (yellow card) 67' Marin 84' Alonso (yellow card) 90' Alcedo (yellow card) 90+3'	Stadium: Estadio Gran Canaria; Attendance: 17,415; Referee: Busquets Ferrer M.

18 December 2022 21	Albacete	4–0	Ibiza	Albacete
14:00 CEST (UTC+2)	Maikel 11' Marin 28' (pen.) Fuster 45+2' Antonio Cristian (yellow card) 65' Rodriguez Perez 81'	Report	Camara (yellow card) 3' Ibiza (yellow card) 27' Pascual (yellow card) 32' Diop (yellow card) 57'	Stadium: Estadio Carlos Belmonte; Attendance: 7,243; Referee: Galech I.

9 January 2023 22	Huesca	1–1	Albacete	Huesca
21:00 CEST (UTC+2)	Tomeo (yellow card) 38' Blasco 48'	Report	Olaetxea (yellow card) 9' Marin 42'	Stadium: Estadio El Alcoraz; Attendance: 3,086; Referee: Frances R.

16 January 2023 23	Albacete	1–0	Leganés	Albacete
21:00 CEST (UTC+2)	Dubasin 15' Rodriguez (yellow card) 36' Olaetxea (yellow card) 68' Rodriguez Perez (yellow card) 86'	Report	Undabarrena (yellow card) 45+1' Saenz (yellow card) 56' Gonzalez (yellow card) 68' Qasmi (red card) 90' Miramon (yellow card) 90+2'	Stadium: Estadio Carlos Belmonte; Attendance: 4,930; Referee: Caparros I.

23 January 2023 24	Andorra	0–1	Albacete	Andorra
21:00 CEST (UTC+2)	Pastor (red card) 54' Auagdo Pallares (yellow card) 57' Sarabia* (yellow card) 57' Rodriganez (yellow card) 84' Molina (yellow card) 84' Bakis (yellow card) 84' Sarabia* (yellow card) 89' (red card)	Report	Fuster 75' Maikel (yellow card) 81' Barragan (yellow card) 84' Dubasin (yellow card) 86'	Stadium: Estadi Nacional; Attendance: 1,220; Referee: Quintero A.
Note: *not on the pitch

29 January 2023 25	Albacete	2–0	Lugo	Albacete
18:30 CEST (UTC+2)	Dubasin 59' Fuster 75' Rodri (yellow card) 83'	Report		Stadium: Estadio Carlos Belmonte; Attendance: 8,762; Referee: Galvez Rascon D.

4 February 2023 26	Tenerife	1–0	Albacete	Santa Cruz de Tenerife
18:30 CEST (UTC+2)	Nacho (yellow card) 4' Enric 12' (pen.) Sanz (yellow card) 19' Jose Angel (yellow card) 34' Garces (yellow card) 57' Romero (yellow card) 60' Elady (yellow card) 68'	Report	Antonio Cristian (yellow card) 11' Alvarez (yellow card) 84' Alcedo (yellow card) 86'	Stadium: Estadio Heliodoro Rodríguez López; Attendance: 15,514; Referee: Fuentes Molina A.

12 February 2023 27	Albacete	3–2	Málaga	Albacete
14:00 CEST (UTC+2)	Marin 4' Maikel (yellow card) 12' Fuster 55' Dubasin 62'	Report	Junior 16' Caro Serrano (yellow card) 25' Sol 34' Munoz (yellow card) 36' Munoz (yellow card) 37' (red card) Junior (yellow card) 38' N"Diaye (yellow card) 44'	Stadium: Estadio Carlos Belmonte; Attendance: 9,467; Referee: Trujillo Suarez D.

19 February 2023 28	Burgos	1–1	Albacete	Burgos
18:30 CEST (UTC+2)	Atienza (yellow card) 24' Elgezabal (yellow card) 86' Boyomo 90+2' (o.g.)	Report	Boyomo (yellow card) 33' Antonio Cristian (yellow card) 50' Marin (yellow card) 51' Dubasin (yellow card) 70' Olaetxea 77'	Stadium: Estadio El Plantío; Attendance: 10,832; Referee: Toca Lopez J.

26 February 2023 29	Real Oviedo	1–1	Albacete	Oviedo
21:00 CEST (UTC+2)	Jimmy Suarez 29' Prendes (yellow card) 35' Vallejo (yellow card) 38' Moro (yellow card) 45+8'	Report	Fuster (yellow card) 29' Olaetxea (yellow card) 48' Rodriguez (yellow card) 58' Rodriguez Perez 65'	Stadium: Estadio Carlos Tartiere; Attendance: 9,110; Referee: Reig S. A.

5 March 2023 30	Albacete	2–1	Gijón	Albacete
16:15 CEST (UTC+2)	Dubasin 12' Marin (yellow card) 25' Maikel 35' Barragan (yellow card) 65'	Report	Djurdjevic 9' Diaz (yellow card) 41' Djurdjevic (yellow card) 65'	Stadium: Estadio Carlos Belmonte; Attendance: 12,443; Referee: De La Fuente Ramos O.

12 March 2023 31	Levante	0–0	Albacete	Valencia
19:30 CEST (UTC+2)	de Frutos (yellow card) 60'	Report	Maikel (yellow card) 37' Maikel (yellow card) 42' (red card) Boyomo (yellow card) 56' Albes* (yellow card) 58' Alcedo (yellow card) 79'	Stadium: Estadi Ciutat de València; Attendance: 18,371; Referee: Barrera R.

19 March 2023 32	Albacete	1–2	Granada	Albacete
17:15 CEST (UTC+2)	Rodriguez (yellow card) 37' Fuster (yellow card) 59' Marin 64' Alonso (yellow card) 90'	Report	Uzuni 30' Sanchez 54' Bodiger (yellow card) 57' Rubio (yellow card) 66' Uzuni (yellow card) 75' Miquel (yellow card) 84' Fernandez (yellow card) 86' Petrovic (yellow card) 90'	Stadium: Estadio Carlos Belmonte; Attendance: 14,448; Referee: Busquets Ferrer M.

26 March 2023 33	Zaragoza	1–1	Albacete	Zaragoza
16:15 CEST (UTC+2)	Frances (yellow card) 43' Marmol 54'	Report	Isaac 66' Alcedo (yellow card) 90'	Stadium: La Romareda; Attendance: 19,812; Referee: Galvez Rascon D.

3 April 2023 34	Albacete	1–2	Las Palmas	Albacete
21:00 CEST (UTC+2)	Dubasin 14' Boyomo (yellow card) 39' Rodri (yellow card) 70' Albes* (yellow card) 81' Antonio Cristian (yellow card) 83'	Report	Kaptoum (yellow card) 41' Clemente (yellow card) 51' Ramirez (yellow card) 59' Sidnel 67' Coco (yellow card) 68' Loiodice 75' Loiodice (yellow card) 79' Molerio (yellow card) 80'	Stadium: Estadio Carlos Belmonte; Attendance: 13,006; Referee: Gorostegui Fernandez A.

8 April 2023 35	Racing Santander	4–1	Albacete	Santander
21:00 CEST (UTC+2)	Baturina 18' Garcia 19' Aldasoro (yellow card) 23' Sanchez (yellow card) 41' Vicente 45+7' (pen.) Fausto (yellow card) 81' Aias 90'	Report	Isaac (yellow card) 21' Olaetxea 31' Dubasin (yellow card) 35' Marin (yellow card) 41' Rodri (yellow card) 57'	Stadium: Campos de Sport de El Sardinero; Attendance: 12,033; Referee: Galech I.

14 April 2023 36	Albacete	3–1	Eibar	Albacete
21:00 CEST (UTC+2)	Marin 19' Garcia 38' Garcia 56' Rodriguez (yellow card) 77' Alcedo (yellow card) 90+4'	Report	Nolaskoain (yellow card) 26' Arbilla (yellow card) 44' Corpas (yellow card) 55' Quique 60' Pereira (yellow card) 74' Alvarez (yellow card) 85' Zidane (yellow card) 90+5'	Stadium: Estadio Carlos Belmonte; Attendance: 10,901; Referee: Alvendiz L.

22 April 2023 37	Villarreal B	1–2	Albacete	Villarreal
14:00 CEST (UTC+2)	Garcia (yellow card) 24' Collado 25' Tasende (yellow card) 44'	Report	Djetei 45' Boyomo (yellow card) 50' Garcia 58'	Stadium: Ciudad Deportiva; Attendance: 4,760; Referee: Trujillo Suarez D.

29 April 2023 38	Albacete	1–1	Cartagena	Albacete
18:30 CEST (UTC+2)	Djetei (red card) 20' Boyomo 25' Boyomo (yellow card) 82' Fuster (yellow card) 90+1'	Report	Izquierdo (yellow card) 24' Musto (yellow card) 38' Datkovic (yellow card) 45+4' Poveda 55' Pepe (yellow card) 70' Ferreiro (yellow card) 75'	Stadium: Estadio Carlos Belmonte; Attendance: 16,008; Referee: Maeso F.

7 May 2023 39	Ibiza	0–5	Albacete	Ibiza
16:15 CEST (UTC+2)	Camara (yellow card) 25' Herrera (yellow card) 45+2' Coke (yellow card) 50' Ruiz (yellow card) 67'	Report	Isaac (yellow card) 24' Alvarez 29' Dubasin 38' Fuster 47' Marin 81' Maikel 90+1'	Stadium: Estadi Municipal de Can Misses; Attendance: 1,213; Referee: Sanchez Lopez R.

14 May 2023 40	Albacete	1–1	Alavés	Albacete
18:30 CEST (UTC+2)	Maikel 39' Rodriguez (yellow card) 48' Barragan (yellow card) 65' Antonio Cristian (yellow card) 71' Alonso (yellow card) 80' Albes* (yellow card) 90+7'	Report	Jason (yellow card) 36' Rioja (yellow card) 61' Laguardia* (yellow card) 65' Villalibre (yellow card) 80' Benavidez (yellow card) 87' Rebbach (yellow card) 90' Marin 90+2' (o.g.)	Stadium: Estadio Carlos Belmonte; Referee: Toca Lopez J.
Note: *not on pitch

20 May 2023 41	Ponferradina	1–1	Albacete	Ponferrada
18:30 CEST (UTC+2)	Agus Medina (yellow card) 24' Nwakali (yellow card) 59' Yuri 69' (pen.) Pascanu (yellow card) 89'	Report	Escriche 15' Escriche (yellow card) 27' Olaetxea (yellow card) 55'	Stadium: Estadio El Toralín; Attendance: 3,645; Referee: Guzman Mansilla J. L.

27 May 2023 42	Albacete	2–1	Mirandés	Albacete
18:30 CEST (UTC+2)	Bolivar 50' Alonso (yellow card) 84' Rodriguez Perez 88'	Report	Garcia (yellow card) 23' Barbu (yellow card) 40' Garcia 49' Rey (yellow card) 66'	Stadium: Estadio Carlos Belmonte; Attendance: 8,808; Referee: Barrera R.

The league fixtures were announced on 23 June 2022.

==== Promotion play-offs ====
3 June 2023 First leg	Albacete	1–3	Levante	Albacete
21:00 CEST (UTC+2)	Djetei 18' Marin (yellow card) 90'	Report	Pepelu (yellow card) 9' de Frutos 30' Djetei 34' (o.g.) Rober Pier (yellow card) 54' de Frutos 56' Munoz (yellow card) 81' Soldado (yellow card) 86' Pubill (yellow card) 90'	Stadium: Estadio Carlos Belmonte; Attendance: 16,324; Referee: Busquets Ferrer M.

7 June 2023 Second leg	Levante	3–0 (6–1 agg.)	Albacete	Valencia
21:00 CEST (UTC+2)	Brugue 20' Brugue 40' Vezo (yellow card) 76' Soldado 83'	Report	Escriche (yellow card) 28' Rodriguez (yellow card) 54'	Stadium: Estadi Ciutat de València; Attendance: 21,826; Referee: Gonzalez Esteban J. A.

=== Copa del Rey ===
12 November 2022 Second round	Huetor Tajar	0–3	Albacete	Albacete, Spain
18:00 CEST (UTC+2)	Entrena (yellow card) 27'; Gadea Herrero (yellow card) 53'; Perez (yellow card) 90+3'; Palomino (yellow card) 116'	Report	Gonzalez (penalty missed); Martinez 104'; Dubasin 110'; Maikel 118'	Stadium: Estadio Carlos Belmonte

21 December 2022 Third round	Logroñés	0–0 (a.e.t.) (4–3 p)	Albacete	Logroño, Spain
21:00 CEST (UTC+2)	Lopez (yellow card) 54'; Sierra (yellow card) 88'; Menudo (yellow card) 101'; Thior (yellow card) 108'; Arregi (yellow card) 116'	Report	Rodriguez (yellow card) 53'; Kawaya (yellow card) 55'; Fuster (yellow card) 90'; Alcedo (yellow card) 109'	Stadium: Estadio Las Gaunas
	Penalties
	(penalty scored) Boniquet (penalty scored) Saenz (penalty missed) Thior (penalty scored) Keita (penalty scored) Menudo		(penalty scored) Marin (penalty scored) Garcia (penalty missed) Fuster (penalty missed) Rodriguez (penalty scored) Maikel

== Squad statistics ==
No.	Pos.	Name	League		Copa Del Rey		Total		Discipline	
No.	Pos.	Name	Apps	Goals	Apps	Goals	Apps	Goals	Yellow card	Red card
1	GK	(Spain) Bernabé Barragán	31	0	0	0	31	0	5	0
2	DF	(Cameroon) Mohammed Djetei	33	2	2	0	35	2	3	1
3	DF	(Spain) Juan Antonio Ros	24	0	1	0	25	0	0	0
5	MF	(Spain) Maikel Mesa	39	8	2	1	41	9	6	2
6	DF	(Cameroon) Flavien Enzo Boyomo	39	1	0	0	39	1	10	1
7	FW	(Spain) Garcia Juan Manuel	31	4	1	0	32	4	1	0
8	MF	(Spain) Fran Álvarez	26	1	2	0	28	1	2	0
10	MF	(Spain) Manu Fuster	42	8	2	0	44	8	5	0
11	FW	(Venezuela) Jovanny Bolívar	8	1	0	0	8	1	0	0
12	FW	(Spain) Higinio Marín	38	11	1	0	39	11	8	0
13	GK	(Spain) Diego Altube	13	0	2	0	15	0	0	0
14	MF	(Spain) Sergi Maestre	14	0	1	0	15	0	1	0
16	FW	(Belgium) Jonathan Dubasin	41	10	2	1	43	11	6	0
17	DF	(Spain) Julio Alonso	38	0	1	0	39	0	7	1
18	MF	(Spain) Riki	39	1	1	0	40	1	12	1
19	MF	(Spain) Lander Olaetxea	41	3	1	0	42	3	10	0
20	MF	(Iceland) Diego Johannesson	0	0	0	0	0	0	0	0
