= 2023–24 Albacete Balompié season =

Albacete Balompié
2023–24 season
- President: Georges Kabchi
- Head coach: Rubén Albés
- Stadium: Estadio Carlos Belmonte
- Segunda División: 18th
- Copa del Rey: First round
- Top goalscorer: League: Manu Fuster (8); All: Manu Fuster (8)
- Average home league attendance: 10,601
Home colours	Away colours	Third colours

The 2023–24 season is Albacete Balompié's 84th season in existence and second consecutive in the Segunda División, the second division of association football in Spain. They will also compete in the Copa del Rey.

== Players ==
=== First-team squad ===
As of 13 February 2024

Note: Flags indicate national team as defined under FIFA eligibility rules; some limited exceptions apply. Players may hold more than one non-FIFA nationality.

No.	Pos.	Nation	Player
1	GK	ESP	Bernabé Barragán (captain)
2	DF	CMR	Mohammed Djetei
3	DF	ARG	Jonathan Silva (on loan from Getafe)
4	MF	ESP	Agus Medina
5	DF	ESP	Juan Antonio Ros
6	MF	ESP	Rai Marchán
7	FW	ESP	Juanma García
8	MF	ESP	Riki Rodríguez
9	FW	ESP	Higinio Marín
10	FW	ESP	Manu Fuster
11	FW	ESP	Fidel
13	GK	ESP	Diego Altube
14	FW	ESP	Pedro Benito

No.	Pos.	Nation	Player
15	DF	BRA	Kaiky (on loan from Almería)
16	FW	ESP	Dani Escriche
17	DF	ESP	Julio Alonso
18	MF	ESP	Antonio Pacheco
19	MF	ESP	Lander Olaetxea
20	MF	ENG	Samuel Shashoua
21	FW	ESP	Alberto Quiles
22	DF	ESP	Carlos Isaac
23	DF	ESP	Álvaro Rodríguez
24	DF	ESP	Cristian Glauder
25	GK	CZE	Tomáš Vaclík
—	DF	ISL	Diegui

=== Reserve team ===
Note: Flags indicate national team as defined under FIFA eligibility rules; some limited exceptions apply. Players may hold more than one non-FIFA nationality.

No.	Pos.	Nation	Player
29	MF	ESP	Capi
30	FW	ESP	Javi Vargas
33	MF	ESP	Neco Rubayo

No.	Pos.	Nation	Player
34	FW	ESP	Marcos Moreno
35	MF	ESP	Luis Roldán

=== Out on loan ===
Note: Flags indicate national team as defined under FIFA eligibility rules; some limited exceptions apply. Players may hold more than one non-FIFA nationality.

No.	Pos.	Nation	Player
—	DF	ESP	Juan María Alcedo (at Mirandés until 30 June 2024)
—	FW	ESP	Dani González (at Celta Fortuna until 30 June 2024)

No.	Pos.	Nation	Player
—	FW	VEN	Jovanny Bolívar (at Huesca until 30 June 2024)

== Transfers ==
=== In ===
Pos.	Player	Transferred from	Fee	Date	Source
FW	(Spain) Pedro Benito	SS Reyes	Undisclosed	1 July 2023	
FW	(Spain) Alberto Quiles	Unattached	Free	4 July 2023	
MF	(Spain) Antonio Pacheco	Villarreal B	Undisclosed	8 July 2023	
DF	(Brazil) Kaiky	Almería	Loan	1 February 2024	
GK	(Czech Republic) Tomáš Vaclík	Unattached	Free	13 February 2024	

=== Out ===
Pos.	Player	Transferred to	Fee	Date	Source
MF	(Spain) Fran Álvarez	(Poland) Widzew Łódź	Free	1 July 2023	
MF	(Spain) Maikel Mesa	Zaragoza	Free	1 July 2023	
FW	(Belgium) Jonathan Dubasin	(Switzerland) Basel	€3,000,000	1 July 2023	
DF	(Cameroon) Flavien Enzo Boyomo	Valladolid	€1,000,000	7 July 2023	
DF	(Spain) Eric Montes	Contract termination		10 July 2023	
DF	(Spain) Juan María Alcedo	Mirandés	Loan	10 July 2023	
MF	(Spain) Sergi García	Contract termination		17 July 2023	

== Pre-season and friendlies ==
Win Draw Loss Fixtures

22 July 2023 Friendly	Albacete	0–1	Intercity	Albacete
19:30 UTC+2			Roigé 82'	Stadium: Ciudad Deportiva Andrés Iniesta

26 July 2023 Friendly	Albacete	2–0	Ibiza	La Nucía
16:00 UTC+2				Stadium: Campo 2 La Nucía

29 July 2023 Friendly	Albacete	2–3	Eldense	La Nucía
16:00 UTC+2				Stadium: Campo 2 La Nucía

6 August 2023 Friendly	Albacete	6–2	Castellón	Albacete
19:30 UTC+2				Stadium: Ciudad Deportiva Andrés Iniesta

4 January 2024 Friendly	Albacete	2–1	Sanse

== Competitions ==
=== Overall record ===
Competition	First match	Last match	Starting round	Final position	Record							
Competition	First match	Last match	Starting round	Final position	Pld	W	D	L	GF	GA	GD	Win %
Segunda División	13 August 2023	2 June 2024	Matchday 1		32	7	11	14	37	47	−10	21.88
Copa del Rey	1 November 2023		First round	First round	1	0	0	1	0	1	−1	0.00
Total					33	7	11	15	37	48	−11	21.21

Last updated: 25 March 2024
Source: Soccerway

=== Segunda División ===
==== League table ====
Pos	Team	Pld	W	D	L	GF	GA	GD	Pts
11	Elche	42	16	11	15	43	46	−3	59 (Note: Levante finished ahead of Burgos, Racing Ferrol, and Elche on head-to-head points: Levante 12 pts, Burgos 8 pts, Racing Ferrol 8 pts, Elche 4 pts. Burgos finished ahead of Racing Ferrol on head-to-head points: Racing Ferrol 1–1 Burgos, Burgos 2–0 Racing Ferrol)
12	Tenerife	42	15	11	16	38	41	−3	56
13	Albacete	42	12	15	15	50	56	−6	51 (Note: Albacete finished ahead of Cartagena and Zaragoza on head-to-head points: Albacete 6 pts, Cartagena 5 pts, Zaragoza 4 pts)
14	Cartagena	42	14	9	19	37	51	−14	51
15	Zaragoza	42	12	15	15	42	42	0	51

Updated to match(es) played on 2 Jun 2024. Source: LaLiga HyperMotion
Rules for classification: 1) Points; 2) Head-to-head points; 3) Head-to-head goal difference; 4) Goal difference; 5) Goals scored; 6) Fair-play points
(Note: Head-to-head record is used only after all the matches between the teams in question have been played)

==== Results summary ====
Overall								Home						Away					
Pld	W	D	L	GF	GA	GD	Pts	W	D	L	GF	GA	GD	W	D	L	GF	GA	GD
42	12	15	15	50	56	−6	51	9	8	4	28	21	+7	3	7	11	22	35	−13

Source: LALIGA HYPERMOTION

==== Results by round ====
Round	1	2	3	4	5	6	7	8	9	10	11	12	13	14	15	16	17	18	19	20	21	22	23	24	25	26	27	28	29	30	31	32	33
Ground	H	H	A	H	A	H	A	H	A	H	A	H	A	H	A	A	H	A	H	A	H	A	H	A	H	A	H	A	A	H	A	H	H
Result	D	D	L	W	L	W	L	W	W	L	L	L	D	D	D	D	W	L	W	L	D	L	L	L	D	D	W	D	L	L	L	D	
Position	12	16	19	12	15	12	15	11	10	11	12	15	17	17	16	16	16	16	15	16	16	16	16	16	17	20	17	17	17	18	18	19	

Updated to match(es) played on 25 March 2024. Source: LALIGA HYPERMOTION
A = Away; H = Home; W = Win; D = Draw; L = Loss

==== Matches ====
The league fixtures were unveiled on 28 June 2023.

13 August 2023 1	Albacete	1–1	Espanyol	Albacete
19:30 CEST (UTC+2)	Fuster (penalty missed) 26', (penalty missed) 43'; Olaetxea (yellow card) 61'; Glauder (yellow card) 63'; Quiles 90+3'; Ros (yellow card) 90+7'	Report	Calero 40', (yellow card) 64'; Gil (yellow card) 72'; Lozano (yellow card) 90+8'	Stadium: Carlos Belmonte; Attendance: 11,618; Referee: Adrián Cordero Vega

20 August 2023 2	Albacete	2–2	Amorebieta	Albacete
22:00 CEST (UTC+2)	Olaetxea (yellow card) 8'; Fuster 45+2'; Medina (yellow card) 45+5'; Quiles 49'	Report	Rodríguez 5'; Garreta 24'	Stadium: Carlos Belmonte; Attendance: 10,231; Referee: Iosu Galech Apezteguía

27 August 2023 3	Leganés	2–0	Albacete	Leganés
21:30 CEST (UTC+2)	Raba 22' (pen.); D. García 68' (pen.)	Report		Stadium: Estadio Municipal de Butarque; Attendance: 6,927; Referee: Iván Caparrós Hernández

1 September 2023 4	Albacete	2–0	Valladolid	Albacete
21:30 CEST (UTC+2)	Djetei 17'; Medina 61'	Report		Stadium: Carlos Belmonte; Attendance: 11,453; Referee: José Luis Guzmán Mansilla

9 September 2023 5	Tenerife	2–0	Albacete	Santander
21:00 CEST (UTC+2)	Gallego 17' (pen.); López 36'	Report		Stadium: Campos de Sport de El Sardinero; Referee: Andrés Fuentes Molina

16 September 2023 6	Albacete	2–1	Burgos	Albacete
21:00 CEST (UTC+2)	Quiles 3' (pen.); Glauder 53'; Olaetxea (yellow card) 76'	Report	Saveljich (yellow card) 45+1'; Niño 60'; Martín (yellow card) 86'	Stadium: Carlos Belmonte; Attendance: 10,008; Referee: Rubén Ávalos Barrera

23 September 2023 7	Racing Santander	2–1	Albacete	Santander
21:00 CEST (UTC+2)	Arana 22'; Martín 29'; Grenier (yellow card) 50'; Aldasoro (yellow card) 65'	Report	Djetei (yellow card) 28'; Alonso (yellow card) 52'; Ros (yellow card) 55'; Marín 90'	Stadium: Campos de Sport de El Sardinero; Attendance: 13,563; Referee: Saúl Ais Reig

30 September 2023 8	Albacete	3–1	Andorra	Albacete
21:00 CEST (UTC+2)		Report		Stadium: Carlos Belmonte

8 December 2023 19	Albacete	2–0	Villarreal B	Albacete
CET (UTC+1)	Medina 52'; Fuster 71'			Stadium: Carlos Belmonte

16 December 2023 20	Mirandés	2–0	Albacete	Miranda de Ebro
CET (UTC+1)	Martín 24', 64' (pen.)			Stadium: Estadio Municipal de Anduva

19 December 2023 21	Albacete	1–1	Eldense	Albacete
CET (UTC+1)	Marín 70'		Doué (yellow card) 85' (yellow-red card) 90+4'; S. Ortuño 90+2'	Stadium: Carlos Belmonte

13 January 2024 22	Levante	3–2	Albacete	Valencia
CET (UTC+1)				Stadium: Estadi Ciutat de València

20 January 2024 23	Albacete	0–1	Alcorcón	Albacete
CET (UTC+1)			Dyego Sousa 89'	Stadium: Carlos Belmonte

28 January 2024 24	Burgos	2–1	Albacete	Burgos
CET (UTC+1)				Stadium: Estadio El Plantío

3 February 2024 25	Albacete	1–1	Cartagena	Albacete
CET (UTC+1)				Stadium: Carlos Belmonte

12 February 2024 26	Valladolid	0–0	Albacete	Valladolid
CET (UTC+1)				Stadium: Estadio José Zorrilla

18 February 2024 27	Albacete	2–0	Racing Santander	Albacete
14:00 CET (UTC+1)				Stadium: Carlos Belmonte; Referee: Álvaro Moreno Aragón

25 February 2024 28	Amorebieta	1–1	Albacete	Lezama
21:00 CET (UTC+1)				Stadium: Instalaciones de Lezama Campo 2 Referee: Oliver de la Fuente Ramos

1 March 2024 29	Sporting Gijón	2–1	Albacete	Gijón
20:30 CET (UTC+1)				Stadium: El Molinón; Referee: Iván Caparrós Hernández

9 March 2024 30	Albacete	1–2	Oviedo	Albacete
16:15 CET (UTC+1)				Stadium: Carlos Belmonte; Referee: Raúl Martín González Francés

17 March 2024 31	Elche	3–2	Albacete	Elche
18:30 CET (UTC+1)	Morente 45'; Fernández 49'; Daoudi 80'		Fuster 11', 78'	Stadium: Estadio Martínez Valero; Referee: Miguel Sesma Espinosa

25 March 2024 32	Albacete	1–1	Racing Ferrol	Albacete
20:30 CET (UTC+1)	Quiles 26'		Losada 57'	Stadium: Carlos Belmonte; Referee: José Antonio López Toca

30 March 2024 33	Albacete	v	Huesca	Albacete
18:30 CET (UTC+1)				Stadium: Carlos Belmonte

=== Copa del Rey ===
1 November 2023 First round	Terrassa	1–0	Albacete	Terrassa
18:00 CET (UTC+1)	Cano 49'	Report		Stadium: Estadi Olímpic de Terrassa; Referee: Andrés Fuentes Molina
