= 2023 Segunda División play-offs =

Football competition

Segunda División play-offs
- Season: 2022–23
- Promoted: Alavés
- Matches played: 6
- Goals scored: 12 (2 per match)

The 2022–23 Segunda División play-offs were played from 3 June to 17 June 2023 and determined the third team promoted to La Liga for the following season. Teams placed between 3rd and 6th position took part in the promotion play-offs.

== Regulations ==
The regulations were the same as the previous season: in the semi-finals, the fifth-placed team faced the fourth-placed team, while the sixth-placed team faced the third. Each tie was played over two legs, with the team lower in the table hosting the first leg.

The team that scored more goals on aggregate over the two legs advanced to the next round. If the aggregate score was level, then thirty minutes of extra time would be played. If no goals were scored during extra time, the winner would be the best positioned team in the regular season.

== Road to the play-offs ==
Pos	Team	Pld	W	D	L	GF	GA	GD	Pts	Qualification or relegation
3	Levante	42	18	18	6	46	30	+16	72 (Note: Overall goal difference: Las Palmas +20, Levante +16.)	Qualification for promotion play-offs
4	Alavés (O, P)	42	19	14	9	47	33	+14	71 (Note: Alavés finished ahead of Eibar on head-to-head points: Eibar 0–0 Alavés, Alavés 2–0 Eibar.)	Qualification for promotion play-offs
5	Eibar	42	19	14	9	45	36	+9	71	Qualification for promotion play-offs
6	Albacete	42	17	16	9	58	47	+11	67	Qualification for promotion play-offs

Source: LaLiga SmartBank
Rules for classification: 1) points; 2) head-to-head points; 3) head-to-head goal difference; 4) goal difference; 5) number of goals scored
(O) Play-off winners; (P) Promoted
Notes:

Notes

1. Reserve teams are not eligible for promotion to the same league as the first team.

== Bracket ==
Semi–finals
3	Levante	3	3	6
6	Albacete	1	0	1
4	Alavés	1	2	3
5	Eibar	1	0	1

Final
3	Levante	0	0	0
4	Alavés	0	1	1

=== Semi–finals ===
Team 1	Agg.	Team 2	1st leg	2nd leg
Levante	6–1	Albacete	3–1	3–0
Alavés	3–1	Eibar	1–1	2–0

First leg

3 June 2023	Eibar	1–1	Alavés	Eibar
18:30 UTC+2	Stoichkov 46'	Report	Sylla 9'	Stadium: Estadio Municipal de Ipurúa; Attendance: 7,300; Referee: David Gálvez Rascón

Eibar	Alavés

GK	25	(France) Luca Zidane
RB	6	(Spain) Sergio Álvarez
CB	5	(Spain) Juan Berrocal	(yellow card) 30'
CB	23	(Spain) Anaitz Arbilla (c)	(yellow card) 60' (yellow-red card) 73'
LB	15	(Spain) Álvaro Tejero
CM	22	(Spain) Peru Nolaskoain
CM	8	(Brazil) Matheus Pereira
RW	17	(Spain) José Corpas		(substituted off) 46'
AM	14	(Spain) Javi Muñoz	(yellow card) 48'	(substituted off) 76'
LW	19	(Spain) Stoichkov		(substituted off) 76'
CF	9	(Argentina) Gustavo Blanco Leschuk	(yellow card) 40'	(substituted off) 46'
Substitutions:
GK	1	(Spain) Ander Cantero
GK	13	(Spain) Yoel Rodríguez
DF	2	(Spain) Chema		(substituted in) 76'
DF	4	(Spain) Rober Correa
MF	10	(Spain) Ager Aketxe		(substituted in) 46'
MF	11	(France) Yanis Rahmani
MF	31	(Spain) Ángel Troncho
FW	7	(Spain) Quique González		(substituted in) 76'
FW	18	(Spain) Jon Bautista		(substituted in) 46'
FW	20	(Spain) Juan Carlos Arana
FW	21	(Spain) Álvaro Vadillo
Manager:
(Spain) Gaizka Garitano

GK	1	(Spain) Antonio Sivera
RB	14	(Argentina) Nahuel Tenaglia
CB	22	(Morocco) Abdel Abqar
CB	4	(Serbia) Aleksandar Sedlar
LB	3	(Spain) Rubén Duarte (c)	(substituted off) 83'
CM	8	(Spain) Salva Sevilla	(substituted off) 70'
CM	23	(Uruguay) Carlos Benavídez	(substituted off) 83'
CM	18	(Spain) Jon Guridi
RF	10	(Spain) Jason	(substituted off) 57'
CF	7	(Senegal) Mamadou Sylla	(substituted off) 70'
LF	11	(Spain) Luis Rioja
Substitutions:
GK	1	(Equatorial Guinea) Jesús Owono
DF	2	(Colombia) Anderson Arroyo
DF	5	(Spain) Víctor Laguardia
DF	27	(Spain) Javi López	(substituted in) 83'
MF	6	(Spain) Toni Moya	(substituted in) 70'
MF	17	(Spain) Xeber Alkain	(substituted in) 57'
MF	28	(Equatorial Guinea) Álex Balboa
FW	9	(Spain) Miguel de la Fuente
FW	12	(Spain) Asier Villalibre	(substituted in) 70'
FW	20	(Spain) Rober
FW	21	(Algeria) Abde Rebbach
FW	29	(Argentina) Joaquín Panichelli	(substituted in) 83'
Manager:
(Spain) Luis García Plaza

3 June 2023	Albacete	1–3	Levante	Albacete
21:00 UTC+2	Djetei 18'	Report	De Frutos 30', 56'; Djetei 34' (o.g.)	Stadium: Estadio Carlos Belmonte; Attendance: 16,324; Referee: Mateo Busquets Ferrer

Albacete	Levante

GK	13	(Spain) Diego Altube
RB	23	(Spain) Álvaro Rodríguez		(substituted off) 78'
CB	2	(Cameroon) Mohammed Djetei
CB	6	(France) Flavien Enzo Boyomo
LB	24	(Spain) Antonio Glauder		(substituted off) 63'
CM	19	(Spain) Lander Olaetxea
CM	18	(Spain) Riki
RW	16	(Spain) Jonathan Dubasin
AM	5	(Spain) Maikel Mesa		(substituted off) 57'
LW	10	(Spain) Manu Fuster
CF	21	(Spain) Dani Escriche		(substituted off) 78'
Substitutions:
GK	1	(Spain) Bernabé Barragán
DF	17	(Spain) Julio Alonso		(substituted in) 63'
DF	22	(Spain) Carlos Isaac		(substituted in) 78'
DF	26	(Spain) Juan María Alcedo
MF	3	(Spain) Juan Antonio Ros
MF	8	(Spain) Franz Álvarez
MF	35	(Spain) Luis Roldán
MF	29	(Spain) Rodri
FW	7	(Spain) Juanma		(substituted in) 78'
FW	11	(Venezuela) Jovanny Bolívar
FW	12	(Spain) Higinio Marín	(yellow card) 90'	(substituted in) 57'
Manager:
(Spain) Rubén Albés

GK	13	(Spain) Joan Femenías
RB	29	(Spain) Marc Pubill	(yellow card) 90'
CB	15	(Spain) Sergio Postigo (c)
CB	4	(Spain) Róber Pier	(yellow card) 54'
LB	16	(Spain) Álex Muñoz	(yellow card) 81'
RM	20	(Spain) Joni Montiel		(substituted off) 80'
CM	10	(Spain) Vicente Iborra
CM	8	(Spain) Pepelu	(yellow card) 9'
LM	18	(Spain) Jorge de Frutos		(substituted off) 87'
CF	17	(Spain) Roger Brugué		(substituted off) 65'
CF	22	(Morocco) Mohamed Bouldini		(substituted off) 80'
Substitutions:
GK	1	(Spain) Dani Cárdenas
GK	26	(Spain) Pablo Cuñat
DF	2	(Spain) Son
DF	5	(Germany) Shkodran Mustafi
DF	14	(Portugal) Rúben Vezo
DF	23	(Uruguay) Marcelo Saracchi		(substituted in) 65'
MF	34	(Spain) Carlos Benítez
MF	42	(Spain) Edgar Alcañiz
FW	9	(Spain) Roberto Soldado	(yellow card) 86'	(substituted in) 80'
FW	11	(Spain) Álex Cantero		(substituted in) 80'
FW	21	(Belgium) Charly Musonda		(substituted in) 87'
Manager:
(Spain) Javier Calleja

Second leg

7 June 2023	Levante	3–0 (6–1 agg.)	Albacete	Valencia
21:00 UTC+2	Brugué 20', 40'; Soldado 83'	Report		Stadium: Estadi Ciutat de València; Attendance: 21,826; Referee: Jon Ander González Esteban

Levante	Albacete

GK	13	(Spain) Joan Femenías
RB	29	(Spain) Marc Pubill
CB	15	(Spain) Sergio Postigo (c)
CB	4	(Spain) Róber Pier	(substituted off) 46'
LB	16	(Spain) Álex Muñoz	(substituted off) 78'
RM	20	(Spain) Joni Montiel
CM	10	(Spain) Vicente Iborra
CM	8	(Spain) Pepelu
LM	18	(Spain) Jorge de Frutos	(substituted off) 78'
CF	17	(Spain) Roger Brugué	(substituted off) 64'
CF	22	(Morocco) Mohamed Bouldini	(substituted off) 58'
Substitutions:
GK	1	(Spain) Dani Cárdenas
GK	26	(Spain) Pablo Cuñat
DF	2	(Spain) Son	(substituted in) 64'
DF	5	(Germany) Shkodran Mustafi
DF	14	(Portugal) Rúben Vezo	(substituted in) 46'	(yellow card) 79'
DF	23	(Uruguay) Marcelo Saracchi	(substituted in) 78'
MF	34	(Spain) Carlos Benítez
MF	42	(Spain) Edgar Alcañiz
FW	7	(Brazil) Wesley	(substituted in) 58'
FW	9	(Spain) Roberto Soldado	(substituted in) 78'
FW	11	(Spain) Álex Cantero
FW	21	(Belgium) Charly Musonda
Manager:
(Spain) Javier Calleja

GK	1	(Spain) Bernabé Barragán (c)
RB	23	(Spain) Álvaro Rodríguez
CB	2	(Cameroon) Mohammed Djetei
CB	6	(France) Flavien Enzo Boyomo	(substituted off) 46'
LB	24	(Spain) Antonio Glauder	(substituted off) 46'
CM	18	(Spain) Riki		(yellow card) 54'
CM	19	(Spain) Lander Olaetxea	(substituted off) 72'
RW	16	(Spain) Jonathan Dubasin	(substituted off) 72'
LW	10	(Spain) Manu Fuster
CF	12	(Spain) Higinio Marín	(substituted off) 46'
CF	21	(Spain) Dani Escriche		(yellow card) 28'
Substitutions:
GK	13	(Spain) Diego Altube
DF	26	(Spain) Juan María Alcedo
DF	17	(Spain) Julio Alonso	(substituted in) 46'
DF	22	(Spain) Carlos Isaac
MF	5	(Spain) Maikel Mesa	(substituted in) 72'
MF	3	(Spain) Juan Antonio Ros	(substituted in) 46'
MF	8	(Spain) Franz Álvarez
MF	29	(Spain) Rodri
MF	35	(Spain) Luis Roldán
FW	7	(Spain) Juanma	(substituted in) 46'
FW	11	(Venezuela) Jovanny Bolívar	(substituted in) 72'
Manager:
(Spain) Rubén Albés

8 June 2023	Alavés	2–0 (3–1 agg.)	Eibar	Vitoria-Gasteiz
21:00 UTC+2	Rebbach 1'; Villalibre 88'	Report		Stadium: Estadio de Mendizorrotza; Referee: Adrián Cordero Vega

Alavés	Eibar

GK	1	(Spain) Antonio Sivera
RB	14	(Argentina) Nahuel Tenaglia	(substituted off) 73'
CB	22	(Morocco) Abdel Abqar	(substituted off) 78'
CB	4	(Serbia) Aleksandar Sedlar
LB	3	(Spain) Rubén Duarte (c)
CM	37	(Spain) Antonio Blanco
CM	8	(Spain) Salva Sevilla	(substituted off) 38'
CM	18	(Spain) Jon Guridi	(substituted off) 79'
LW	21	(Algeria) Abde Rebbach
LF	11	(Spain) Luis Rioja
CF	7	(Senegal) Mamadou Sylla	(substituted off) 72'
Substitutions:
GK	31	(Equatorial Guinea) Jesús Owono
DF	2	(Colombia) Anderson Arroyo	(substituted in) 73'
DF	5	(Spain) Víctor Laguardia	(substituted in) 78'
DF	27	(Spain) Javi López
MF	6	(Spain) Toni Moya	(substituted in) 38'
MF	10	(Spain) Jason
MF	17	(Spain) Xeber Alkain
MF	23	(Uruguay) Carlos Benavídez	(substituted in) 79'
FW	9	(Spain) Miguel de la Fuente
FW	12	(Spain) Asier Villalibre	(substituted in) 72'
FW	20	(Spain) Rober
FW	29	(Argentina) Joaquín Panichelli
Manager:
(Spain) Luis García Plaza

GK	25	(France) Luca Zidane
RB	4	(Spain) Rober Correa	(substituted off) 69'
CB	2	(Spain) Chema
CB	5	(Spain) Juan Berrocal
LB	15	(Spain) Álvaro Tejero
RW	6	(Spain) Sergio Álvarez	(substituted off) 79'
CM	8	(Brazil) Matheus Pereira
LW	11	(France) Yanis Rahmani	(substituted off) 46'
AM	14	(Spain) Javi Muñoz	(substituted off) 46'
LW	19	(Spain) Stoichkov
CF	7	(Spain) Quique González	(substituted off) 56'
Substitutions:
GK	1	(Spain) Ander Cantero
GK	13	(Spain) Yoel Rodríguez
DF	24	(Spain) Daniel Lasure
MF	10	(Spain) Ager Aketxe	(substituted in) 46'
MF	17	(Spain) José Corpas	(substituted in) 56'
MF	22	(Spain) Peru Nolaskoain	(substituted in) 69'
MF	31	(Spain) Ángel Troncho
FW	9	(Argentina) Gustavo Blanco Leschuk	(substituted in) 79'
FW	18	(Spain) Jon Bautista	(substituted in) 46'
FW	20	(Spain) Juan Carlos Arana
Manager:
(Spain) Gaizka Garitano

== Final ==
Team 1	Agg.	Team 2	1st leg	2nd leg
Levante	0–1 (a.e.t.)	Alavés	0–0	0–1

First leg

11 June 2023	Alavés	0–0	Levante	Vitoria-Gasteiz
21:00 UTC+2		Report		Stadium: Estadio de Mendizorrotza; Attendance: 19,369; Referee: Víctor García Verdura

Alavés	Levante

GK	1	(Spain) Antonio Sivera
RB	14	(Argentina) Nahuel Tenaglia
CB	22	(Morocco) Abdel Abqar	(yellow card) 65'
CB	4	(Serbia) Aleksandar Sedlar		(substituted off) 78'
LB	3	(Spain) Rubén Duarte (c)
CM	6	(Spain) Toni Moya
MF	23	(Uruguay) Carlos Benavídez
CM	18	(Spain) Jon Guridi		(substituted off) 69'
LW	21	(Algeria) Abde Rebbach		(substituted off) 69'
LF	11	(Spain) Luis Rioja
CF	7	(Senegal) Mamadou Sylla	(yellow card) 43'	(substituted off) 58'
Substitutions:
GK	31	(Equatorial Guinea) Jesús Owono
DF	2	(Colombia) Anderson Arroyo
DF	5	(Spain) Víctor Laguardia		(substituted in) 78'
DF	27	(Spain) Javi López
MF	10	(Spain) Jason
MF	17	(Spain) Xeber Alkain		(substituted in) 69'
MF	28	(Equatorial Guinea) Álex Balboa
FW	9	(Spain) Miguel de la Fuente
FW	12	(Spain) Asier Villalibre	(yellow card) 89'	(substituted in) 58'
FW	20	(Spain) Rober		(substituted in) 69'
FW	29	(Argentina) Joaquín Panichelli
Manager:
(Spain) Luis García Plaza

GK	13	(Spain) Joan Femenías
RB	29	(Spain) Marc Pubill		(substituted off) 53'
CB	15	(Spain) Sergio Postigo (c)	(yellow card) 80'
CB	4	(Spain) Róber Pier
LB	16	(Spain) Álex Muñoz		(substituted off) 74'
RM	20	(Spain) Joni Montiel		(substituted off) 77'
CM	10	(Spain) Vicente Iborra
CM	8	(Spain) Pepelu
LM	18	(Spain) Jorge de Frutos
CF	17	(Spain) Roger Brugué		(substituted off) 73'
CF	22	(Morocco) Mohamed Bouldini		(substituted off) 73'
Substitutions:
GK	1	(Spain) Dani Cárdenas
GK	26	(Spain) Pablo Cuñat
DF	2	(Spain) Son		(substituted in) 53'
DF	14	(Portugal) Rúben Vezo		(substituted in) 73'
DF	23	(Uruguay) Marcelo Saracchi		(substituted in) 74'
MF	19	(Spain) Robert Ibáñez
MF	34	(Spain) Carlos Benítez
MF	42	(Spain) Edgar Alcañiz
FW	7	(Brazil) Wesley Moraes		(substituted in) 73'
FW	9	(Spain) Roberto Soldado		(substituted in) 77'
FW	11	(Spain) Álex Cantero
FW	21	(Belgium) Charly Musonda
Manager:
(Spain) Javier Calleja

Second leg

17 June 2023	Levante	0–1 (a.e.t.) (0–1 agg.)	Alavés	Valencia
21:00 UTC+2		Report	Villalibre 120+9' (pen.)	Stadium: Estadi Ciutat de València; Attendance: 22,919; Referee: Francisco José Hernández Maeso

Levante	Alavés

GK	13	(Spain) Joan Femenías
RB	29	(Spain) Marc Pubill
CB	14	(Portugal) Rúben Vezo		(substituted off) 111'
CB	4	(Spain) Róber Pier
LB	16	(Spain) Álex Muñoz
RM	20	(Spain) Joni Montiel	(yellow card) 90+1'	(substituted off) 90+2'
CM	10	(Spain) Vicente Iborra	(yellow card) 105+5'
CM	8	(Spain) Pepelu	(yellow card) 97'
LM	18	(Spain) Jorge de Frutos		(substituted off) 111'
CF	17	(Spain) Roger Brugué		(substituted off) 58'
CF	22	(Morocco) Mohamed Bouldini		(substituted off) 62'
Substitutions:
GK	1	(Spain) Dani Cárdenas
GK	26	(Spain) Pablo Cuñat
DF	2	(Spain) Son		(substituted in) 111'
DF	5	(Germany) Shkodran Mustafi	(yellow card) 120+7'
DF	15	(Spain) Sergio Postigo		(substituted in) 111'
DF	23	(Uruguay) Marcelo Saracchi
MF	19	(Spain) Robert Ibáñez		(substituted in) 90+2'
MF	34	(Spain) Carlos Benítez
FW	7	(Brazil) Wesley		(substituted in) 58'
FW	9	(Spain) Roberto Soldado	(yellow card) 105+5'	(substituted in) 62'
FW	11	(Spain) Álex Cantero
FW	21	(Belgium) Charly Musonda
Manager:
(Spain) Javier Calleja

GK	1	(Spain) Antonio Sivera	(yellow card) 120+3'
RB	14	(Argentina) Nahuel Tenaglia		(substituted off) 98'
CB	22	(Morocco) Abdel Abqar	(yellow card) 112'
CB	4	(Serbia) Aleksandar Sedlar
LB	3	(Spain) Rubén Duarte (c)	(yellow card) 20'	(substituted off) 90'
CM	23	(Uruguay) Carlos Benavídez	(yellow card) 114'
CM	18	(Spain) Jon Guridi		(substituted off) 86'
RW	19	(Spain) Xeber Alkain		(substituted off) 63'
LW	11	(Spain) Luis Rioja
CF	9	(Spain) Miguel de la Fuente		(substituted off) 70'
CF	12	(Spain) Asier Villalibre
Substitutions:
GK	33	(Argentina) Adrián Rodríguez
DF	2	(Colombia) Anderson Arroyo
DF	5	(Spain) Víctor Laguardia
DF	27	(Spain) Javi López		(substituted in) 90'
DF	32	(Spain) Imanol Baz
MF	6	(Spain) Toni Moya		(substituted in) 70'
MF	10	(Spain) Jason		(substituted in) 98'
MF	28	(Equatorial Guinea) Álex Balboa
FW	7	(Senegal) Mamadou Sylla		(substituted in) 106'
FW	20	(Spain) Rober
FW	21	(Algeria) Abde Rebbach		(substituted in) 63'
FW	29	(Argentina) Joaquín Panichelli	(yellow card) 100'	(substituted in) 86'	(substituted off) 106'
Manager:
(Spain) Luis García Plaza
