= 2024–25 Albacete Balompié season =

Albacete Balompié
2024–25 season
- Head coach: Alberto González
- Stadium: Estadio Carlos Belmonte
- Segunda División: 9th
- Copa del Rey: First round
- Top goalscorer: League: Higinio Marín (2); All: Higinio Marín (2)
Home colours

The 2024–25 season is the 86th season in the history of the Albacete Balompié, and the club's third consecutive season in Segunda División. In addition to the domestic league, the team is scheduled to participate in the Copa del Rey.

== Transfers ==
=== In ===
Pos.	Player	Transferred from	Fee	Date	Source
GK	(Spain) Cristian Rivero	(Spain) Valencia	Loan	5 July 2024	
DF	(Spain) Diego González	(Spain) Elche CF	Free	7 July 2024	
DF	(Spain) Samuel Vázquez	(Spain) Hércules CF	Free	8 July 2024	
MF	(Spain) Javi Villar	(Spain) Real Madrid Castilla	Undisclosed	8 July 2024	

=== Out ===
Pos.	Player	Transferred to	Fee	Date	Source
MF	(Spain) Lander Olaetxea	(Spain) Sporting de Gijón	End of contract	1 July 2024	
MF	(England) Samuel Shashoua	(United States) Minnesota United	End of contract	1 July 2024	

== Friendlies ==
=== Pre-season ===
19 July 2024 Friendly	Albacete	1–1	Yeclano	Albacete
10:00 UTC+2	Riki 90+4'		Solsona 14'	Stadium: Ciudad Deportiva Andrés Iniesta; Attendance: 200

27 July 2024 Friendly	Oviedo	2–0	Albacete	San Pedro del Pinatar
19:00	Alemão 24'; Del Moral 38'			Stadium: Pinatar Arena
Note: One period of 45 minutes

27 July 2024 Friendly	Getafe CF	v	Albacete
20:00

27 July 2024 Friendly	Albacete	0–3	Eldense	San Pedro del Pinatar
21:00			Juanto 15'; Simo 36', 41'	Stadium: Pinatar Arena
Note: One period of 45 minutes

3 August 2024 Friendly	Orihuela	1–1	Albacete
20:00 UTC+2

=== Mid-season ===
18 August 2024 Friendly	Albacete	4–0	Linares Deportivo
20:00 UTC+2

== Competitions ==
=== Overall record ===
Competition	First match	Last match	Starting round	Record							
Competition	First match	Last match	Starting round	Pld	W	D	L	GF	GA	GD	Win %
Segunda División	15 August 2024	1 June 2025	Matchday 1	7	3	0	4	10	12	−2	42.86
Copa del Rey				0	0	0	0	0	0	+0	—
Total				7	3	0	4	10	12	−2	42.86

Last updated: 27 September 2024
Source: Soccerway

=== Segunda División ===
==== League table ====
Pos	Team	Pld	W	D	L	GF	GA	GD	Pts
8	Huesca	42	18	10	14	58	49	+9	64
9	Eibar	42	15	13	14	44	41	+3	58 (Note: Eibar finished ahead of Albacete on head-to-head points: Albacete 0–1 Eibar, Eibar 1–1 Albacete.)
10	Albacete	42	15	13	14	57	57	0	58
11	Sporting Gijón	42	14	14	14	57	54	+3	56
12	Burgos	42	15	10	17	41	48	−7	55 (Note: Burgos finished ahead of Cádiz and Córdoba on head-to-head points: Burgos 6 pts, Cádiz 5 pts, Córdoba 4 pts.)

Source: LaLiga Hypermotion
Rules for classification: 1) Points; 2) Head-to-head points; 3) Head-to-head goal difference; 4) Goal difference; 5) Goals scored; 6) Fair-play points
(Note: Head-to-head record is used only after all the matches between the teams in question have been played)

==== Results summary ====
Overall								Home						Away					
Pld	W	D	L	GF	GA	GD	Pts	W	D	L	GF	GA	GD	W	D	L	GF	GA	GD
7	3	0	4	10	12	−2	9	1	0	2	3	6	−3	2	0	2	7	6	+1

Last updated: 27 September 2024.

==== Results by round ====
Round	1	2	3	4	5	6	7
Ground	A	H	A	H	A	A	H
Result	W	W	L	L	L	W	L
Position							

Updated to match(es) played on 27 September 2024. Source:
A = Away; H = Home; W = Win; D = Draw; L = Loss

==== Matches ====
The match schedule was released on 26 June 2024.

31 August 2024 3	Málaga	2–1	Albacete	Málaga
21:30				Stadium: La Rosaleda

9 September 2024 4	Albacete	0–1	Eibar	Albacete
21:00				Stadium: Estadio Carlos Belmonte

15 September 2024 5	Mirandés	2–0	Albacete	Miranda de Ebro
14:00				Stadium: Anduva

21 September 2024 6	Racing Ferrol	1–4	Albacete	Ferrol
16:15	Purić 72'		Juanma 48'; Marín 78'; Rueda 90+1'; Alcedo 90+7'	Stadium: Estadio Municipal da Malata

27 September 2024 7	Albacete	2–5	Deportivo La Coruña	Albacete
20:30	Quiles 4'; Chaves 76'		Mella 9', 80'; Hernández 12', 61'; Herrera 74'	Stadium: Estadio Carlos Belmonte
