= Juan Antonio Ros =

Spanish footballer

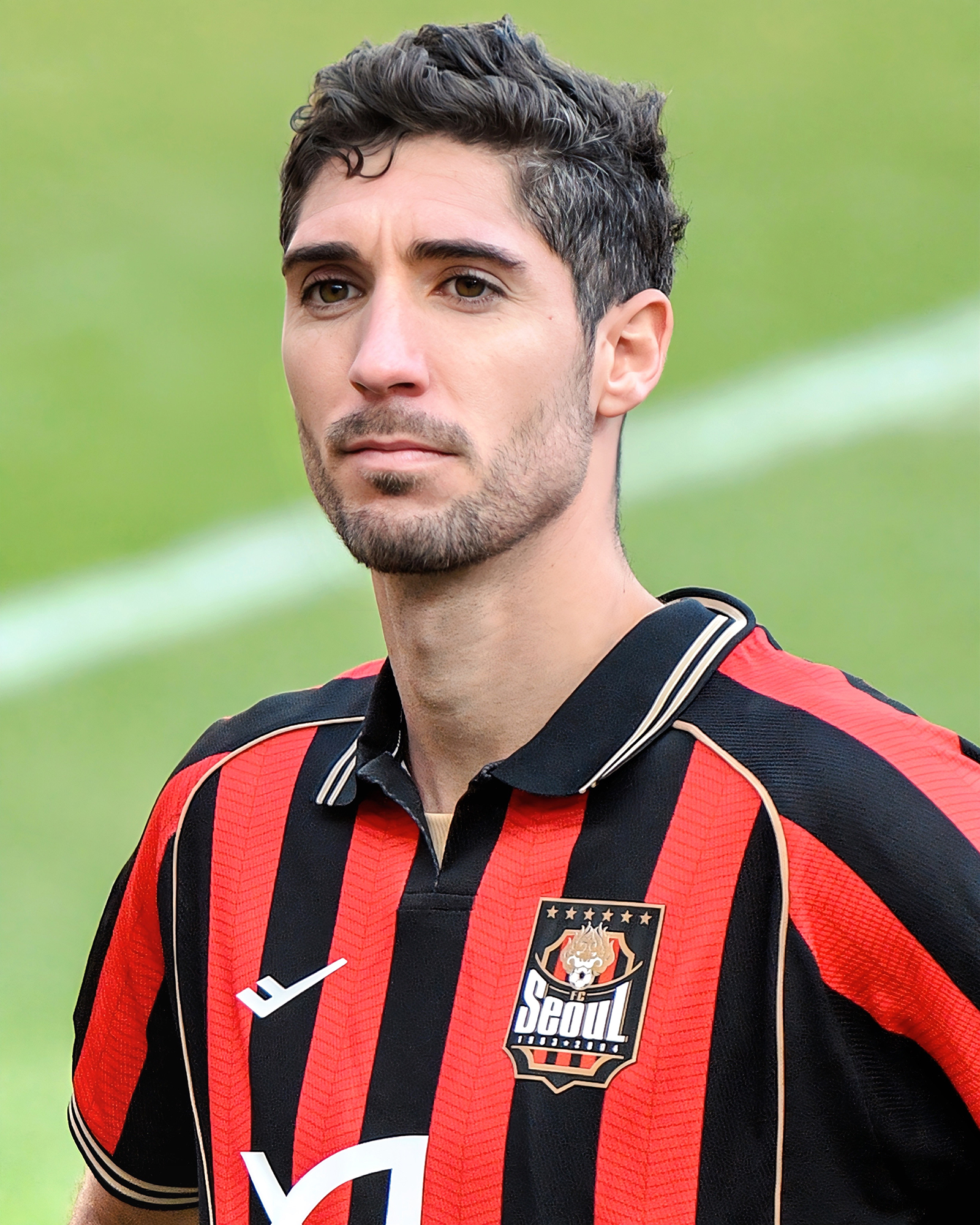
- Ros in 2026

Personal information
- Full name: Juan Antonio Ros Martínez
- Date of birth: 15 March 1996 (age 30)
- Place of birth: Cartagena, Spain
- Height: 1.86 m (6 ft 1 in)
- Positions: Centre-back; defensive midfielder

Team information
- Current team: FC Seoul
- Number: 37

Youth career
- Los Belones
- Cartagena-La Unión
- Torre Pacheco
- Cartagena
- 2013–2015: Barcelona

Senior career*
Years	Team	Apps	(Gls)
2015–2016	Barcelona B	28	(1)
2016–2020	Celta B	97	(1)
2017	→ Cartagena (loan)	4	(0)
2020–2021	Villarreal B	19	(0)
2021–2022	Lugo	31	(1)
2022–2025	Albacete	62	(1)
2025	Tianjin Jinmen Tiger	29	(1)
2026–	FC Seoul	21	(2)

International career
2013	Spain U17	1	(0)
- * Club domestic league appearances and goals as of 3 August 2026

Juan Antonio Ros Martínez (born 15 March 1996) is a Spanish professional footballer who plays as either a centre-back or a defensive midfielder for K League 1 club FC Seoul.

== Club career ==
Born in Cartagena but raised in Los Nietos, both in the Region of Murcia, Ros joined FC Barcelona's La Masia in 2013, after representing FC Cartagena, EF Torre Pacheco, FC Cartagena-La Unión and CF Los Belones. After finishing his graduation, he was promoted to the reserves in July 2015, after the club's relegation to Segunda División B.

Ros made his senior debut on 22 August 2015, starting in a 1–2 away loss against UE Cornellà. He scored his first senior goal the following 27 March, netting the opener in a 2–0 win at CD Llosetense.

On 14 July 2016, Ros moved to another reserve team, Celta de Vigo B also in the third division. The following 19 January, after being sparingly used, he moved to fellow league team FC Cartagena on loan for the remainder of the season.

Upon returning, Ros was a regular starter for Celta B until signing for Villarreal CF B on 5 August 2020. On 25 June of the following year, he agreed to a two-year contract with Segunda División side CD Lugo.

Ros made his professional debut on 15 August 2021, starting in a 2–2 away draw against Real Oviedo. He scored his first professional goal on 6 November, in a 2–1 home loss against SD Ponferradina.

On 25 July 2022, Ros signed a three-year deal with Albacete Balompié also in the second division. On 28 January 2025, he agreed to terminate his contract with the club.

On 23 January 2026, Ros signed with K League 1 club FC Seoul.

== Career statistics ==
As of match played 3 August 2026

Appearances and goals by club, season and competition
Club	Season	League			National cup (Note: Includes Copa del Rey)		Other		Total	
Club	Season	Division	Apps	Goals	Apps	Goals	Apps	Goals	Apps	Goals
Barcelona B	2015–16	Segunda División B	28	1	—		—		28	1
Celta B	2016–17	Segunda División B	8	0	—		—		1	0
Celta B	2017–18	Segunda División B	30	1	—		4	1	34	1
Celta B	2018–19	Segunda División B	37	0	—		2	0	39	0
Celta B	2019–20	Segunda División B	22	0	—		—		22	0
Celta B	Total		97	1	—		6	1	103	1
Cartagena (loan)	2016–17	Segunda División B	4	0	—		1	0	5	0
Villarreal B	2020–21	Segunda División B	15	0	—		4	0	19	0
Lugo	2021–22	Segunda División	31	1	0	0	—		31	1
Albacete	2022–23	Segunda División	24	0	1	0	1	0	26	0
Albacete	2023–24	Segunda División	22	1	1	0	—		23	1
Albacete	2024–25	Segunda División	16	0	1	0	—		17	0
Albacete	Total		62	1	3	0	1	0	66	1
Tianjin Jinmen Tiger	2025	Chinese Super League	29	1	0	0	—		29	1
Seoul	2026	K League 1	21	2	0	0	3 (Note: Appearances in AFC Champions League)	0	24	2
Career total			287	7	3	0	15	1	305	8

== Honours ==
FC Seoul

- K League 1: 2026
