= Agus Medina =

Spanish footballer (born 1994)

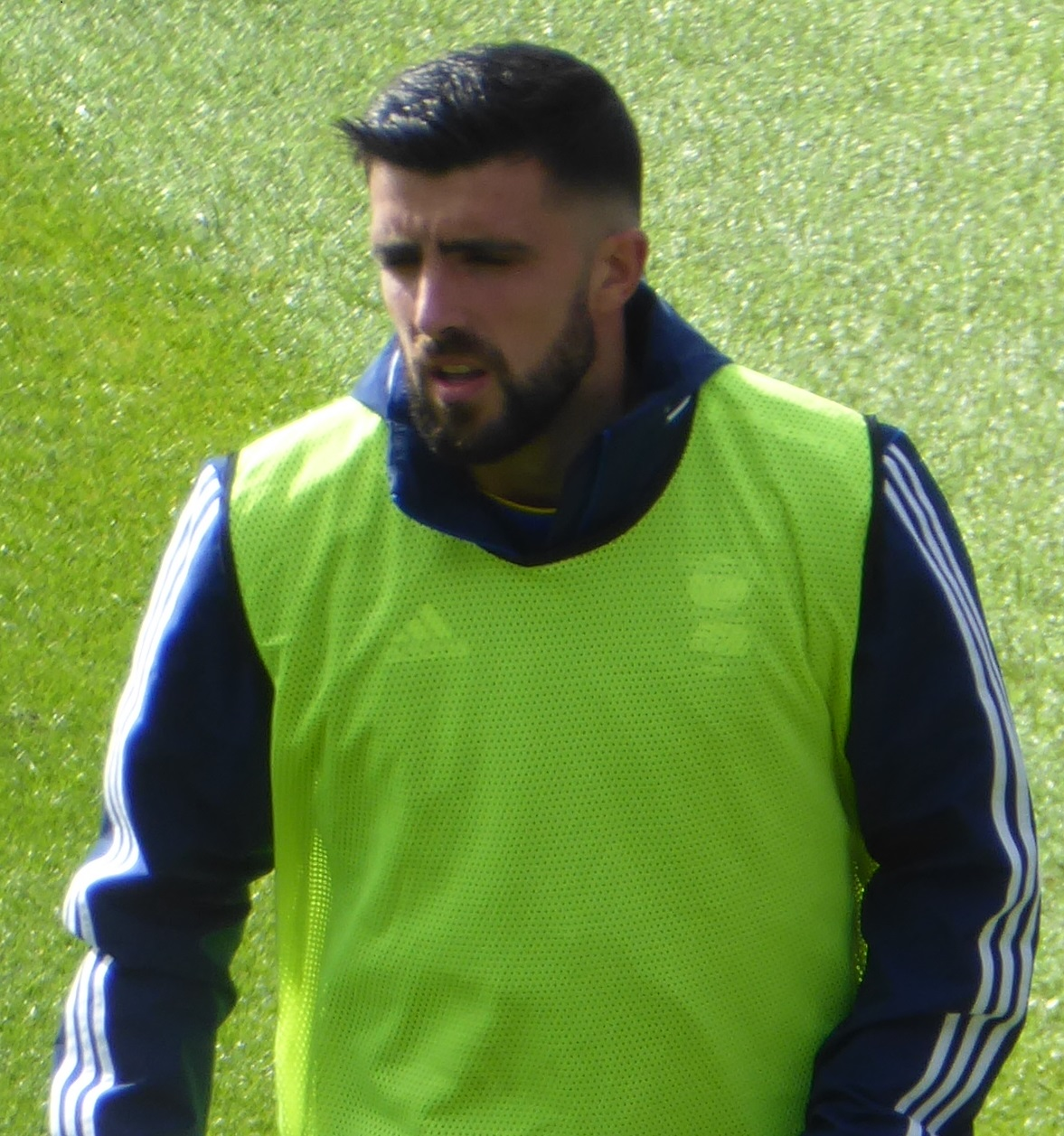
- Medina with Birmingham City in 2019

Personal information
- Full name: Agustín Medina Delgado
- Date of birth: 8 September 1994 (age 32)
- Place of birth: Barberà del Vallès, Spain
- Height: 1.76 m (5 ft 9 in)
- Position: Central midfielder

Team information
- Current team: Albacete
- Number: 4

Youth career
- 2000–2004: Barberà Andalucía
- 2004–2006: Terrassa
- 2006–2009: Jàbac Terrassa
- 2009–2013: Valencia
- 2013–2014: Sabadell

Senior career*
Years	Team	Apps	(Gls)
2013–2015	Sabadell B	21	(3)
2014–2016	Sabadell	37	(3)
2016–2018	Celta B	63	(6)
2018–2019	Cornellà	35	(3)
2019–2021	Birmingham City	1	(0)
2020	→ Cornellà (loan)	9	(1)
2020–2021	→ Cornellà (loan)	26	(7)
2021–2023	Ponferradina	70	(5)
2023–	Albacete	100	(12)
- * Club domestic league appearances and goals as of 9 June 2026

Agustín "Agus" Medina Delgado (born 8 September 1994) is a Spanish professional footballer who plays for Segunda División club Albacete. Mainly a central midfielder, he can also play as a right-back.

== Club career ==
=== Sabadell ===
Born in Barberà del Vallès, Barcelona, Catalonia, Medina joined Valencia CF's youth system in 2009, aged 14. In July 2013, he moved to CE Sabadell FC and was assigned to the reserves in the regional leagues.

Medina featured regularly for the B-side, which was promoted to the Tercera División, and signed a new deal with the club, of one year with the option of a further two. On 24 August 2014, he played his first match as a professional, starting in a 2–3 home loss against Real Betis in the Segunda División.

=== Celta B and Cornellà ===
On 3 August 2016, free agent Medina signed a two-year contract with another reserve team, Celta de Vigo B of the Segunda División B. On 14 July 2018, he moved to another third-tier team, UE Cornellà, for the coming season.

=== Birmingham City ===
Ahead of the 2019–20 season, he signed a two-year contract with Cornellà's sister club, Birmingham City of the English Championship. He made his debut on 6 August in the starting eleven for the EFL Cup first round visit to Portsmouth, partnering Craig Gardner in central midfield as two of the few experienced players in a team that lost 3–0. Four days later, he made his first Football League appearance as a late substitute in a 1–1 draw with Bristol City.

==== Loans to Cornellà ====
Having made no further first-team appearances, Medina rejoined Cornellà on 15 January 2020 on loan until 30 June. He made nine appearances, scored once, an equaliser at home to Gimnàstic de Tarragona, and was never on the losing side, before football in Spain was suspended because of the COVID-19 pandemic. When it was confirmed that the promotion play-offs would take place, his loan spell was extended to cover the remainder of the season. His goal in the semifinal took Cornellà through to the final, in which they lost 1–0 to CD Castellón so were not promoted.

Medina was twice an unused substitute at the beginning of Birmingham's 2020–21 season, but with several midfielders ahead of him in new head coach Aitor Karanka's pecking order, he rejoined Cornellà on 2 October 2020 on loan for the season. He continued as a first-team regular, and it was his cross, "flicked home expertly" by Adrián Jiménez, that led to Cornellà eliminating La Liga leaders Atlético Madrid from the 2020–21 Copa del Rey. He finished the season with seven goals from 26 league appearances as Cornellà ensured their place in the new third-tier Primera RFEF for the 2021–22 season. Birmingham confirmed that he would be released when his contract expired at the end of the season.

=== Ponferradina ===
Amid interest from clubs including Burgos CF, UD Ibiza and Deportivo de La Coruña, Medina signed for Segunda División club SD Ponferradina on 3 July 2021. He scored his first professional goal on 19 September, his team's fourth in a 4–0 home win against Málaga CF.

=== Albacete ===
On 23 July 2023, after Ponferradina's relegation, Medina signed a three-year contract with another Segunda División club, Albacete Balompié.

== Career statistics ==
As of match played 15 March 2025

Appearances and goals by club, season and competition
Club	Season	League			National cup (Note: Includes Copa del Rey, FA Cup)		League cup (Note: Includes EFL Cup)		Other		Total	
Club	Season	Division	Apps	Goals	Apps	Goals	Apps	Goals	Apps	Goals	Apps	Goals
Sabadell B	2013–14	Primera Catalana	1	0	—		—		—		1	0
Sabadell B	2014–15	Tercera División	20	3	—		—		—		20	3
Sabadell B	Total		21	3	—		—		—		21	3
Sabadell	2014–15	Segunda División	7	0	3	0	—		—		10	0
Sabadell	2015–16	Segunda División B	30	3	1	0	—		—		31	3
Sabadell	Total		37	3	4	0	—		—		41	3
Celta de Vigo B	2016–17	Segunda División B	26	1	—		—		1 (Note: Appearance(s) in Segunda División B play-offs)	0	27	1
Celta de Vigo B	2017–18	Segunda División B	37	5	—		—		4	0	41	5
Celta de Vigo B	Total		63	6	—		—		5	0	68	6
Cornellà	2018–19	Segunda División B	35	3	1	0	—		2	1	38	4
Birmingham City	2019–20	Championship	1	0	—		1	0	—		2	0
Birmingham City	2020–21	Championship	0	0	—		0	0	—		0	0
Birmingham City	Total		1	0	—		1	0	—		2	0
Cornellà (loan)	2019–20	Segunda División B	9	1	—		—		3	1	12	2
Cornellà (loan)	2020–21	Segunda División B	26	7	3	0	—		—		29	8
Cornellà (loan)	Total		35	8	3	0	—		3	1	41	9
Ponferradina	2021–22	Segunda División	37	4	3	1	—		—		40	5
Ponferradina	2022–23	Segunda División	33	1	1	0	—		—		34	1
Ponferradina	Total		70	5	4	1	—		—		74	6
Albacete	2023–24	Segunda División	35	4	1	0	—		—		36	4
Albacete	2024–25	Segunda División	30	0	1	0	—		—		31	0
Albacete	Total		65	4	2	0	—		—		67	4
Career total			315	32	14	1	1	0	10	2	349	35
