= Javier Belman =

Spanish footballer (born 1998)

Personal information
- Full name: José Javier Belman Calvo
- Date of birth: 4 October 1998 (age 28)
- Place of birth: Alicante, Spain
- Height: 1.84 m (6 ft 0 in)
- Position: Goalkeeper

Team information
- Current team: Talavera
- Number: 13

Youth career
- 2006–2011: Rayo Majadahonda
- 2011–2012: Getafe
- 2012–2017: Real Madrid

Senior career*
Years	Team	Apps	(Gls)
2017–2020	Real Madrid B	51	(0)
2020–2022	Fuenlabrada	26	(0)
2022–2023	Leganés	0	(0)
2023–2024	Fuenlabrada	37	(0)
2024–2025	Ibiza	8	(0)
2026–	Talavera	16	(0)
- * Club domestic league appearances and goals as of 10 June 2026

José Javier Belman Calvo (born 4 October 1998) is a Spanish footballer who plays as a goalkeeper for Talavera.

== Career ==
Born in Alicante, Valencian Community, Belman joined Real Madrid's La Fábrica in 2012, from Getafe CF. Ahead of the 2017–18 season, he was promoted to the reserves in Segunda División B, and made his senior debut on 27 August 2017 by starting in a 3–0 away win against Coruxo FC.

A regular starter in his first campaign, Belman subsequently lost his starting spot to Luca Zidane in his second, later regaining the first-choice after Luca departed. On 16 July 2019, he renewed his contract until 2021, but suffered a knee injury the following February which ruled him out of the remainder of the season.

On 25 September 2020, Belman agreed to a one-year contract with Segunda División side CF Fuenlabrada, after terminating his contract with Real Madrid. He made his first team debut on 16 December, starting in a 1–0 away success over CD Atlético Baleares, for the season's Copa del Rey.

Belman made his professional debut on 19 December 2020, playing the full 90 minutes of a 3–2 away win against RCD Mallorca. After becoming a first-choice ahead of Pol Freixanet and Dragan Rosić, he was demoted to third-choice behind new signings Diego Altube and Miguel Morro for the 2021–22 season, after refusing to renew his contract.

Belman only made another appearance for Fuenla in March 2022, ten months after the last one, after the arrival of new manager José Ramón Sandoval. On 11 November, he agreed to a contract with CD Leganés also in the second level until the end of the season.

On 25 July 2024, Belman signed with Ibiza in Primera Federación.

== Personal life ==
Belman's father, José, was also a footballer and a goalkeeper. He notably represented Real Zaragoza and Portugal's C.D. Nacional.
