= Sergi Maestre =

Spanish footballer

Personal information
- Full name: Sergi Maestre García
- Date of birth: 18 November 1990 (age 35)
- Place of birth: Barcelona, Spain
- Height: 1.87 m (6 ft 2 in)
- Position: Midfielder

Team information
- Current team: Cultural Leonesa
- Number: 6

Youth career
- Barcelona
- Damm
- 2008–2009: Barcelona

Senior career*
Years	Team	Apps	(Gls)
2009–2010	Barcelona B	0	(0)
2009–2010	→ Lugo (loan)	24	(0)
2010–2012	Zaragoza B	59	(1)
2012–2013	Celta B	31	(0)
2013–2014	Badalona	28	(2)
2014–2015	Olot	16	(0)
2015	Cornellà	18	(0)
2015–2018	Badalona	62	(3)
2018–2019	Murcia	35	(1)
2019–2021	Badajoz	45	(1)
2021–2024	Albacete	29	(0)
2024	Sabadell	13	(0)
2024–	Cultural Leonesa	54	(1)
- * Club domestic league appearances and goals as of 9 June 2026

Sergi Maestre García (born 18 November 1990) is a Spanish footballer who plays as a midfielder for Cultural Leonesa.

== Club career ==
Born in Barcelona, Catalonia, Maestre represented FC Barcelona and CF Damm as a youth. On 28 August 2019, after finishing his formation, he was loaned to Segunda División B side CD Lugo for the season.

In 2010, Maestre moved to Real Zaragoza and was assigned to the reserves in Tercera División. He helped in the side's promotion to the third division in his first campaign, before signing for RC Celta de Vigo's B-team in 2012.

Maestre continued to play in the third division in the following years, representing CF Badalona (two stints), UE Olot, UE Cornellà, Real Murcia and CD Badajoz. On 15 June 2021, he signed a two-year contract with Albacete Balompié in Primera División RFEF, and featured sparingly due to a knee injury as the club achieved promotion to Segunda División.

Maestre returned from injury in July 2022, and made his professional debut at the age of 31 on 4 September, coming on as a late substitute for Riki in a 2–1 away win over Málaga CF.

On 1 February 2024, after making no appearances during the first half of the campaign, Maestre terminated his contract with Alba, and signed for third division side CE Sabadell FC just hours later.

In the summer of 2024, Maestre joined Cultural Leonesa in the third tier on a contract for one season, with an optional second season.
