= Alberto Quiles =

Spanish footballer (born 1995)

Personal information
- Full name: Alberto Quiles Piosa
- Date of birth: 27 April 1995 (age 31)
- Place of birth: Huelva, Spain
- Height: 1.88 m (6 ft 2 in)
- Position: Forward

Team information
- Current team: Tianjin Jinmen Tiger
- Number: 9

Youth career
- Recreativo
- 2013–2014: → Celta (loan)

Senior career*
Years	Team	Apps	(Gls)
2014–2018	Córdoba B	94	(34)
2015	→ Marbella (loan)	11	(4)
2016–2019	Córdoba	3	(0)
2017–2018	→ UCAM Murcia (loan)	21	(5)
2018–2019	→ Recreativo (loan)	32	(3)
2019–2021	Recreativo	50	(20)
2021–2023	Deportivo La Coruña	67	(34)
2023–2025	Albacete	65	(16)
2025–	Tianjin Jinmen Tiger	59	(28)
- * Club domestic league appearances and goals as of 8 November 2026

Alberto Quiles Piosa (born 27 April 1995) is a Spanish footballer who plays as a forward for Chinese club Tianjin Jinmen Tiger.

== Club career ==
Born in Huelva, Andalusia, Quiles had youth stints at Recreativo de Huelva and Celta de Vigo. On 24 July 2014 he moved to Córdoba CF, being assigned to the reserves in Segunda División B.

Quiles made his senior debut on 7 September 2014, coming on as a late substitute in a 1–0 home win against Granada CF B. The following 30 January, he was loaned to fellow league team Marbella FC until June.

Returning from loan, Quiles scored a career-best 22 goals during the 2015–16 campaign, as his side achieved promotion from Tercera División. He made his professional debut on 20 November 2016, coming on as a late substitute for Alejandro Alfaro in a 1–1 away draw against CD Mirandés in the Segunda División championship.

On 4 July 2017, Quiles was definitely promoted to the main squad ahead of the 2017–18 season. On 1 August, however, he was loaned to third-tier club UCAM Murcia CF for one year.

Quiles was recalled on 31 January 2018, but appeared mainly for the B's during the remainder of the campaign. On 23 August, he moved to his first team Recreativo on a one-year loan deal.

On 13 July 2019, Quiles signed a permanent deal with Recre after cutting ties with Córdoba. On 13 June 2021, following Recre's unprecedented double relegation to Tercera División RFEF due to restructuring of the Spanish football league system, he signed a two-year contract with Primera División RFEF side Deportivo de La Coruña.

On 4 July 2023, free agent Quiles agreed to a two-year deal with Albacete Balompié in the second division. On 23 January 2025, he was transferred to Chinese club Tianjin Jinmen Tiger.

== Career statistics ==
As of match played 8 November 2026

Appearances and goals by club, season and competition
Club	Season	League			Cup		Other		Total	
Club	Season	Division	Apps	Goals	Apps	Goals	Apps	Goals	Apps	Goals
UCAM Murcia (loan)	2014–15	Segunda División B	11	3	—		—		11	3
Córdoba	2016–17	Segunda División	2	0	0	0	—		2	0
Córdoba	2017–18	Segunda División	1	0	—		—		1	0
Córdoba	Total		3	0	0	0	—		3	0
UCAM Murcia (loan)	2017–18	Segunda División B	21	5	1	0	—		22	5
Recreativo (loan)	2018–19	Segunda División B	32	3	—		4	0	36	3
Recreativo	2019–20	Segunda División B	27	7	3	0	—		30	7
Recreativo	2020–21	Segunda División B	23	13	—		1	0	24	13
Recreativo	Recreativo total		82	23	3	0	5	0	90	23
Deportivo La Coruña	2021–22	Primera División RFEF	33	18	2	2	2	2	37	22
Deportivo La Coruña	2022–23	Primera Federación	34	16	1	0	—		35	16
Deportivo La Coruña	Total		67	34	3	2	2	2	72	38
Albacete	2023–24	Segunda División	42	10	1	0	—		43	10
Albacete	2024–25	Segunda División	23	6	1	0	—		24	6
Albacete	Total		65	16	2	0	—		67	16
Tianjin Jinmen Tiger	2025	Chinese Super League	29	16	1	0	—		30	16
Tianjin Jinmen Tiger	2026	Chinese Super League	30	12	0	0	—		30	12
Tianjin Jinmen Tiger	Total		59	28	1	0	—		60	28
Career total			308	112	10	2	7	2	325	116
