= Carlos Isaac =

Spanish footballer (born 1998)

Personal information
- Full name: Carlos Isaac Muñoz Obejero
- Date of birth: 30 April 1998 (age 28)
- Place of birth: Navalmoral de la Mata, Spain
- Height: 1.84 m (6 ft 0 in)
- Position: Right-back

Team information
- Current team: Widzew Łódź
- Number: 2

Youth career
- Escuela Morala
- Diocesano
- 2015–2017: Atlético Madrid

Senior career*
Years	Team	Apps	(Gls)
2017–2020	Atlético Madrid B	60	(3)
2018–2020	Atlético Madrid	2	(0)
2020–2022	Alavés	0	(0)
2020–2021	→ Albacete (loan)	24	(0)
2021–2022	→ Oviedo (loan)	19	(1)
2022–2023	Vizela	9	(0)
2023–2024	Albacete	48	(2)
2024–2026	Córdoba	46	(1)
2026–	Widzew Łódź	11	(1)

International career
2015	Spain U17	1	(0)
- * Club domestic league appearances and goals as of 17:27, 29 May 2026 (UTC)

Carlos Isaac Muñoz Obejero (born 30 April 1998), known as Carlos Isaac, is a Spanish professional footballer who plays as a right-back for Polish club Widzew Łódź.

== Club career ==
Born in Navalmoral de la Mata, Cáceres, Extremadura, Carlos Isaac joined Atlético Madrid's youth setup in 2015 at the age of 17, from CD Diocesano. He made his senior debut with the reserves on 10 September 2017, starting in a 1–1 Segunda División B home draw against Celta de Vigo B.

On 9 March 2018, Carlos Isaac renewed his contract until 2020. His La Liga debut came the following 1 April, as he started in a 1–0 home win against Deportivo de La Coruña.

On 29 August 2020, free agent Carlos Isaac agreed to a three-year deal with Deportivo Alavés, being immediately loaned to Segunda División side Albacete Balompié for the season. Roughly one year later, he moved to fellow second division side Real Oviedo also in a temporary deal.

On 4 August 2022, Carlos Isaac signed a three-year contract with F.C. Vizela of the Portuguese Primeira Liga. The following 17 January, however, he returned to Alba and signed a permanent two-and-a-half-year contract with the club.

On 31 July 2024, Carlos Isaac terminated his link with Albacete and signed a one-year deal with fellow second division side Córdoba CF the following day. On 9 June of the following year, after becoming a first-choice, he agreed to a one-year extension.

On 20 January 2026, Polish Ekstraklasa side Widzew Łódź announced the signing of Isaac on a two-and-a-half-year contract. He sustained an MCL injury during a pre-season friendly with Puszcza Niepołomice on 19 July 2026, sidelining him for several months.

== Career statistics ==
As of match played 9 May 2026

Appearances and goals by club, season and competition
Club	Season	League			National cup (Note: Includes Copa del Rey, Taça de Portugal, Polish Cup)		Other		Total	
Club	Season	Division	Apps	Goals	Apps	Goals	Apps	Goals	Apps	Goals
Atlético Madrid B	2017–18	Segunda División B	21	0	—		—		21	0
Atlético Madrid B	2018–19	Segunda División B	22	1	—		0	0	22	1
Atlético Madrid B	2019–20	Segunda División B	17	2	—		—		17	2
Atlético Madrid B	Total		60	3	0	0	0	0	60	3
Atlético Madrid	2017–18	La Liga	1	0	0	0	—		1	0
Atlético Madrid	2018–19	La Liga	1	0	0	0	—		1	0
Atlético Madrid	Total		2	0	0	0	0	0	2	0
Albacete (loan)	2020–21	Segunda División	24	0	1	0	—		25	0
Oviedo (loan)	2021–22	Segunda División	19	1	0	0	—		19	1
Vizela	2022–23	Primeira Liga	9	0	2	1	1 (Note: Appearance in Taça da Liga)	0	12	1
Albacete	2022–23	Segunda División	16	1	—		1 (Note: Appearance in Segunda División promotion play-offs)	0	17	1
Albacete	2023–24	Segunda División	32	1	0	0	—		32	1
Albacete	Total		48	2	0	0	1	0	49	2
Córdoba	2024–25	Segunda División	29	0	0	0	—		29	0
Córdoba	2025–26	Segunda División	17	1	0	0	—		17	1
Córdoba	Total		46	1	0	0	—		46	1
Widzew Łódź	2025–26	Ekstraklasa	11	1	1	0	—		12	1
Career total			219	8	4	1	2	0	225	9
