= Higinio Marín =

Spanish footballer

Higinio
Personal information
- Full name: Higinio Marín Escavy
- Date of birth: 19 October 1993 (age 33)
- Place of birth: Calasparra, Spain
- Height: 1.84 m (6 ft 1/2 in)
- Position: Forward

Team information
- Current team: Albacete
- Number: 9

Youth career
- Murcia

Senior career*
Years	Team	Apps	(Gls)
2011–2014	Murcia B	51	(9)
2012	Murcia	1	(0)
2014	Cultural Leonesa	0	(0)
2014–2015	La Hoya Lorca	24	(3)
2015–2016	UCAM Murcia	5	(0)
2016–2017	Valladolid B	45	(18)
2017–2020	Numancia	95	(18)
2020–2022	Ludogorets Razgrad	18	(4)
2021	Ludogorets Razgrad II	2	(1)
2022	→ Górnik Zabrze (loan)	7	(3)
2022–	Albacete	92	(25)
- * Club domestic league appearances and goals as of 9 June 2026

Higinio Marín Escavy (born 19 October 1993), simply known as Higinio, is a Spanish professional footballer who plays as a forward for Albacete.

== Club career ==
Born in Calasparra, Murcia, Higinio graduated from local Real Murcia's youth system, making his senior debuts with the reserves in the 2011–12 campaign, in Tercera División. On 15 September 2012 he played his first match as a professional, coming on as a late substitute in a 2–2 home draw against CD Mirandés in the Segunda División championship.

On 2 July 2014 Higinio joined Cultural y Deportiva Leonesa, in Segunda División B. Two months later, however, he left the club and joined La Hoya Lorca CF, also in the third level.

Higinio subsequently represented UCAM Murcia CF and Real Valladolid B in the third division, netting 13 goals for the latter during the 2016–17 season. On 20 June 2017, he returned to the second level after agreeing to a contract with CD Numancia.

Higinio scored ten goals for Numancia in the 2019–20 campaign, as the club suffered relegation. On 12 August 2020, he moved abroad for the first time in his career after signing for Bulgarian side PFC Ludogorets Razgrad. After a bright start for Ludogorets, a serious injury (broken ankle) sustained towards the end of 2020 kept him out of action for a long time.

On 28 February 2022, after being rarely used, Higinio was loaned to Polish side Górnik Zabrze for the remainder of the campaign. On 27 July, he returned to his home country after signing a three-year contract with Albacete Balompié in division two.

== Career statistics ==
As of match played on 15 November 2024

Appearances and goals by club, season and competition
Club	Season	League			Cup		Europe (Note: Appearances in UEFA Champions League and UEFA Europa League)		Total	
Club	Season	Division	Apps	Goals	Apps	Goals	Apps	Goals	Apps	Goals
Real Murcia	2012–13	Segunda División	3	0	0	0	—		3	0
Lorca	2014–15	Segunda División B	24	3	0	0	—		24	3
UCAM Murcia	2015–16	Segunda División B	5	0	2	1	—		7	1
Real Valladolid B	2015–16	Segunda División B	14	5	—		—		14	5
Real Valladolid B	2016–17	Segunda División B	31	13	—		—		31	13
Real Valladolid B	Total		45	18	0	0	0	0	47	19
Numancia	2017–18	Segunda División	29	6	5	1	—		34	7
Numancia	2018–19	Segunda División	28	2	1	0	—		29	2
Numancia	2019–20	Segunda División	38	10	0	0	—		38	10
Numancia	Total		95	18	6	1	0	0	101	19
Ludogorets Razgrad	2020–21	First Professional Football League	8	4	0	0	4	3	12	7
Ludogorets Razgrad	2021–22	First Professional Football League	10	0	2	0	0	0	12	0
Ludogorets Razgrad	Total		18	4	2	0	4	3	24	7
Górnik Zabrze (loan)	2021–22	Ekstraklasa	7	3	0	0	—		7	3
Albacete	2022–23	Segunda División	38	11	1	0	—		39	11
Albacete	2023–24	Segunda División	31	5	1	0	—		32	5
Albacete	2024–25	Segunda División	10	5	0	0	—		10	5
Albacete	Total		79	21	2	0	0	0	81	21
Career total			276	68	12	4	4	3	292	75
