= Álex Willy =

Spanish footballer (born 2004)

Personal information
- Full name: Alejandro Muñoz Langreo
- Date of birth: 10 February 2004 (age 22)
- Place of birth: Cuenca, Spain
- Position: Winger

Team information
- Current team: Toledo

Youth career
- Albacete

Senior career*
Years	Team	Apps	(Gls)
2022–2025	Albacete B	94	(19)
2025	Albacete	1	(0)
2025–	Toledo	10	(0)
- * Club domestic league appearances and goals as of 9 November 2025

Alejandro Muñoz Langreo (born 10 February 2004), known as Álex Willy or just Willy, is a Spanish footballer who plays mainly as a right winger for Tercera Federación club Toledo.

== Club career ==
Born in Cuenca, Castilla–La Mancha, Willy was an Albacete Balompié youth graduate. He made his senior debut with the reserves on 4 September 2022, starting in a 3–1 Primera Autonómica Preferente away win over EFB La Roda, and scored his first goal seven days later, in a 3–0 home success over UD La Fuente.

Willy helped the B-team to achieve promotion to Tercera Federación, and established himself as a regular starter for the side. He made his first team debut on 2 February 2025, coming on as a late substitute for Javi Rueda in a 3–1 Segunda División away loss to CD Tenerife.

== International career ==
On 12 August 2022, Willy was included in the pre-list of the Spain national under-19 team.
