= Javi Vargas =

Spanish footballer

Personal information
- Full name: Javier Vargas Garrido
- Date of birth: 6 March 2001 (age 25)
- Place of birth: Villanueva del Ariscal, Spain
- Position: Winger

Team information
- Current team: Pozoblanco

Youth career
- 2015–2018: Tomares
- 2018–2019: Córdoba
- 2019–2020: Extremadura

Senior career*
Years	Team	Apps	(Gls)
2018–2019	Córdoba B	3	(0)
2020–2021	Extremadura B	20	(1)
2021–2022	Extremadura	13	(0)
2022–2024	Albacete B	48	(4)
2022–2024	Albacete	1	(0)
2024–	Pozoblanco	5	(0)
- * Club domestic league appearances and goals as of 6 October 2024

Javier "Javi" Vargas Garrido (born 6 March 2001) is a Spanish footballer who plays as a winger for Pozoblanco.

== Career ==
Born in Villanueva del Ariscal, Seville, Andalusia, Vargas represented UD Tomares and Córdoba CF as a youth. He made his senior debut with the latter's reserves on 26 August 2018, coming on as a late substitute in a 2–0 Tercera División home win over UD Los Barrios.

In July 2019, after a further two appearances with Córdoba B, Vargas moved to Extremadura UD and returned to the youth setup. He started to feature regularly for their B-team during the 2020–21 season, before starting to feature in the main squad in September 2021, due to their financial problems.

On 11 January 2022, Vargas moved to another reserve team, Atlético Albacete in Tercera División RFEF. He made his first team debut on 12 November, coming on as an extra-time substitute for fellow debutant Borja Marchante in a 3–0 away win over CD Huétor Tájar, for the season's Copa del Rey.

Vargas made his professional debut with Alba on 28 January 2024, replacing Agus Medina late into a 2–1 Segunda División away loss to Burgos CF.
