= Dani González (footballer) =

Spanish footballer

Personal information
- Full name: Daniel González Flores
- Date of birth: 18 March 2002 (age 24)
- Place of birth: Albacete, Spain
- Height: 1.86 m (6 ft 1 in)
- Position: Forward

Youth career
- Albacete

Senior career*
Years	Team	Apps	(Gls)
2021	Albacete B	25	(8)
2021–2024	Albacete	24	(4)
2023	→ Atlético Madrid B (loan)	18	(6)
2023–2024	→ Celta B (loan)	20	(1)
2024–2026	Osasuna B	29	(5)
- * Club domestic league appearances and goals as of 23 May 2026

Daniel "Dani" González Flores (born 18 March 2002) is a Spanish footballer who plays as a forward.

== Club career ==
González was born in Albacete, Castilla-La Mancha, and was an Albacete Balompié youth graduate. He made his senior debut with the reserves on 23 January 2021 by starting in a 0–0 Tercera División home draw against Club Atlético Ibañés, and scored his first goal on 21 February, but in a 3–1 away loss against Calvo Sotelo Puertollano CF.

González made his first team debut for Alba on 30 November 2021, coming on as a second-half substitute for Emiliano Gómez and scoring an extra time winner in a 2–1 home success over Racing de Ferrol, for the season's Copa del Rey. On 27 December, he renewed his contract until 2025.

González scored four times during the remainder of the campaign, as his side returned to Segunda División. On 1 September 2022, he was definitely promoted to the first team, being assigned the number 22 jersey.

González made his professional debut on 18 September 2022, replacing Lander Olaetxea late into a 1–0 home loss against SD Ponferradina. On 27 December, after just 21 minutes in five league matches into the season, he was loaned to Atlético Madrid B until June.

On 2 June 2023, González's loan with Atleti B was extended for a further year, but he moved to another reserve team on 1 September, after agreeing to a one-year loan deal with RC Celta Fortuna.

On 31 July 2024, González moved to another reserve team CA Osasuna B also in the third division, on a one-year contract.
