= Rubén Albés =

Spanish footballer and manager

Personal information
- Full name: Rubén Albés Yáñez
- Date of birth: 24 February 1985 (age 41)
- Place of birth: Vigo, Spain
- Position: Winger

Youth career
- Alerta-Traviesas
- Areosa

Senior career*
Years	Team	Apps	(Gls)
2004–2005	Rápido Bouzas	11	(1)
2005–2006	Pontevedra B		
2006–2007	Céltiga	22	(0)
2007–2009	Rápido Bouzas	39	(0)
Total		72	(1)

Managerial career
- 2008–2009: Rápido Bouzas (youth)
- 2009: Pontevedra (youth)
- 2009–2010: Valencia (youth)
- 2009–2010: Universitat València
- 2010–2011: Burjassot
- 2011–2012: Catarroja
- 2012: Wydad Casablanca (assistant)
- 2013–2014: Novelda
- 2014: Eldense (assistant)
- 2014–2015: Eldense
- 2015: Valladolid B
- 2015–2016: Valladolid (assistant)
- 2016–2017: Valladolid B
- 2017–2019: Celta B
- 2019: UCAM Murcia
- 2020–2021: Hermannstadt
- 2021–2022: Lugo
- 2022–2024: Albacete
- 2024–2025: Sporting Gijón
- 2026: Umm Salal
- 2026: Leganés
- * Club domestic league appearances and goals

Rubén Albés Yáñez (born 24 February 1985) is a Spanish football manager and former player who played as a winger.

== Playing career ==
Born in Vigo, Galicia, Albés represented CP Alerta-Traviesas and CD Areosa as a youth. He played as a senior with Rápido de Bouzas, Pontevedra CF B and Céltiga FC before returning to Rápido and subsequently retiring.

== Coaching career ==
Albés started his career with Rápido Bouzas' youth setup, helping the side achieve promotion to the División de Honor Juvenil de Fútbol. In August 2009, shortly after taking over Pontevedra CF's youth sides, he joined Valencia CF to work in their youth categories; also in the 2009–10 season, he was also in charge of CE Universitat València in the regional leagues.

Ahead of the 2010–11 campaign, Albés was appointed manager of Tercera División side Burjassot CF; at the age of 25, he was the youngest manager of all national divisions. In January 2012, after a short period in charge of fellow fourth division side Catarroja CF, he was named Benito Floro's assistant at Wydad AC in Morocco.

On 26 June 2013, back to his home country, Albés took over Novelda CF in division four. On 28 July of the following year, he was appointed Francisco Yeste's assistant at CD Eldense, but was initially the manager as Yeste did not have the necessary coaching badges. Both Albés and Yeste were suspended for three months, with Albés being named manager after the suspension ended.

On 29 June 2015, Albés replaced Rubén de la Barrera at the helm of Real Valladolid Promesas in Segunda División B. In October, after the arrival of Miguel Ángel Portugal in the first team, he was named his assistant.

On 6 June 2016, Albés returned to Valladolid B for the ensuing season. Roughly one year later he took over another reserve team, Celta de Vigo B also in the third division.

On 11 June 2019, Albés was appointed UCAM Murcia CF manager, but was sacked on 7 October. The following 14 June, he was appointed in charge of Liga I side FC Hermannstadt, replacing Vasile Miriuță.

Albés' first professional match occurred on 22 June 2020, a 1–4 away loss against FC Viitorul Constanța. Sacked the following 14 January, he returned to his home country after being named manager of Segunda División side CD Lugo on 20 April 2021.

On 19 May 2022, after avoiding relegation, Albés announced that he would leave Lugo at the end of the season. On 27 June, he replaced Rubén de la Barrera at the helm of Albacete Balompié, recently promoted to the second division.

Albés led the club to the promotion play-offs after a sixth place finish in 2022–23, but was sacked on 26 March 2024, as the club was nearing the relegation zone in 2023–24. On 22 June, he was announced as manager of fellow second division side Sporting de Gijón. On 6 April 2025, he was sacked following nine matches without a win, met the same fate as the club was nearing the relegation zone.

On 2 February 2026, Albés was announced as manager of Umm Salal SC of the Qatar Stars League. On 15 June, he returned to his country's second division after taking over CD Leganés, but only lasted ten matches before being dismissed on 18 October.

== Managerial statistics ==
As of 16 October 2026

Managerial record by team and tenure
Team	From	To	Record								Ref
Team	From	To	G	W	D	L	GF	GA	GD	Win %	Ref
Novelda	26 June 2013	30 June 2014	47	20	16	11	49	41	+8	42.55	
Eldense	28 July 2014	6 November 2014	13	3	4	6	16	22	−6	23.08	
Eldense	9 March 2015	29 June 2015	12	6	0	6	24	20	+4	50.00	
Valladolid B	29 June 2015	22 October 2015	9	2	5	2	7	9	−2	22.22	
Valladolid B	6 June 2016	12 June 2017	38	15	9	14	40	42	−2	39.47	
Celta B	12 June 2017	11 June 2019	82	33	20	29	93	83	+10	40.24	
UCAM Murcia	11 June 2019	7 October 2019	7	1	4	2	4	5	−1	14.29	
Hermannstadt	14 June 2020	14 January 2021	26	8	9	9	33	38	−5	30.77	
Lugo	20 April 2021	19 May 2022	51	13	23	15	61	67	−6	25.49	
Albacete	27 June 2022	26 March 2024	79	25	28	26	99	101	−2	31.65	
Sporting Gijón	22 June 2024	6 April 2025	36	10	14	12	42	43	−1	27.78	
Umm Salal	2 February 2026	15 June 2026	12	5	3	4	23	21	+2	41.67	
Leganés	15 June 2026	18 October 2026	10	3	2	5	6	15	−9	30.00	
Total			422	144	137	141	497	507	−10	34.12	—
