= Eric Montes =

Spanish footballer (born 1998)

Personal information
- Full name: Eric Montes Arce
- Date of birth: 17 April 1998 (age 28)
- Place of birth: Manresa, Spain
- Height: 1.77 m (5 ft 10 in)
- Positions: Centre back; midfielder

Team information
- Current team: CE Manresa

Youth career
- 2003–2007: Manresa
- 2007–2008: Gimnàstic Manresa
- 2008–2017: Barcelona

Senior career*
Years	Team	Apps	(Gls)
2017–2019	Peralada	55	(4)
2018	Girona	0	(0)
2019–2021	Cultural Leonesa	41	(2)
2021–2023	Albacete	27	(0)
2022–2023	→ Gimnàstic (loan)	34	(1)
2023–2025	Algeciras	57	(4)
2026–	Manresa		
- * Club domestic league appearances and goals as of 21 January 2026

Eric Montes Arce (born 17 April 1998) is a Spanish professional footballer. He played as either a central defender or a central midfielder. He currently plays for CE Manresa.

== Club career ==
Born in Manresa, Barcelona, Catalonia, Montes joined FC Barcelona's youth setup in 2008, from Club Gimnàstic de Manresa. On 27 July 2017, after finishing his formation, he joined Girona FC and was assigned to the reserves in Segunda División B.

Montes made his senior debut on 20 August 2017, starting in a 0–1 home loss against RCD Mallorca. His first goal came on 21 January of the following year, as he scored the opener in a 1–1 draw at Lleida Esportiu.

Montes made his professional debut on 31 October 2018; coming on as a second-half substitute for injured Douglas Luiz, he scored a last-minute equalizer in a 2–2 away draw against Deportivo Alavés, for the season's Copa del Rey. It was his maiden appearance with the main squad during the campaign, which ended in relegation for both first and B-teams.

On 9 August 2019, Montes signed for Cultural y Deportiva Leonesa in the third division. After two seasons as a starter, he moved to Primera División RFEF team Albacete Balompié on 11 June 2021.

After helping Alba in their promotion to Segunda División, Montes was loaned to Gimnàstic de Tarragona in the third tier on 23 August 2022. Upon returning, he terminated his contract on 10 July 2023, and immediately signed for Algeciras CF in the third tier.

He announced his retirement from professional football on December 19, 2025. In January 2026, he signed for CE Manresa in Tercera Federación, the fifth tier of Spanish football.
