= Sergi García (footballer) =

Spanish footballer (born 1999)

Personal information
- Full name: Sergi García Pérez
- Date of birth: 14 April 1999 (age 27)
- Place of birth: Barcelona, Spain
- Height: 1.95 m (6 ft 5 in)
- Position: Midfielder

Team information
- Current team: Europa
- Number: 9

Youth career
- Mercantil
- 2017–2018: Espanyol

Senior career*
Years	Team	Apps	(Gls)
2018–2019	Espanyol B	6	(0)
2018–2019	→ Badalona (loan)	6	(0)
2019	→ Sant Andreu (loan)	15	(2)
2019–2020	La Nucía	12	(0)
2020	Prat	6	(0)
2020–2021	Alavés B	26	(2)
2020–2021	Alavés	2	(0)
2021–2023	Albacete	35	(1)
2022–2023	→ Sabadell (loan)	19	(2)
2023	Alcoyano	16	(2)
2024	Rayo Majadahonda	14	(1)
2024–2025	Sestao River	34	(3)
2025–2026	Sant Andreu	25	(3)
2026–	Europa	9	(1)
- * Club domestic league appearances and goals as of 21 November 2026

Sergi García Pérez (born 14 April 1999) is a Spanish footballer who plays as a central midfielder for Gibraltar Football League club Europa.

== Club career ==
García was born in Barcelona, Catalonia, and joined RCD Espanyol's youth setup in 2017, from CE Mercantil. On 22 August 2018, after finishing his formation, he joined Segunda División B side CF Badalona.

García made his senior debut on 26 August 2018, starting in a 1–3 home loss against former side Espanyol's B-team. The following 31 January, after being rarely used, he moved to Tercera División side UE Sant Andreu.

On 25 July 2019, García returned to the third division after agreeing to a contract with CF La Nucía. The following 9 January, he moved to fellow league team AE Prat.

On 27 July 2020, García signed for Deportivo Alavés and was initially assigned to the reserves in division three. He made his first team – and La Liga – debut on 13 September, coming on as a late substitute for Pere Pons in a 0–1 home loss against Real Betis.

On 30 June 2021, García signed a three-year deal with Albacete Balompié, freshly relegated to Primera División RFEF. After helping in the club's promotion back to Segunda División, he was loaned to third tier side CE Sabadell FC on 1 September 2022.

On 17 July 2023, García terminated his contract with Alba.

On 22 July 2024, García moved to Sestao River in Primera Federación.

== Personal life ==
García's father Jaume was also a footballer and a midfielder. He too represented Espanyol and Alavés.
