= Luis Roldán (footballer) =

Spanish footballer (born 2003)

Personal information
- Full name: Luis Roldán López
- Date of birth: 17 March 2003 (age 23)
- Place of birth: Albacete, Spain
- Position: Midfielder

Team information
- Current team: Juventud Torremolinos (on loan from Elche)
- Number: 29

Youth career
- 2009–2015: Albacer
- 2015–2020: Albacete
- 2020–2021: Real Madrid

Senior career*
Years	Team	Apps	(Gls)
2021–2024	Albacete B	81	(0)
2023–2024	Albacete	1	(0)
2024–	Elche B	33	(0)
2024–	Elche	1	(0)
2025–2026	→ Unionistas (loan)	17	(0)
2026–	→ Juventud Torremolinos (loan)	6	(0)
- * Club domestic league appearances and goals as of 10 June 2026

Luis Roldán López (born 17 March 2003) is a Spanish footballer who plays as a midfielder for Primera Federación club Juventud Torremolinos on loan from Elche.

== Club career ==
Born in Albacete, Castilla–La Mancha, Roldán joined Albacete Balompié's youth sides in 2015, from EF Albacer. On 15 September 2020, he joined Real Madrid's La Fábrica, being assigned to the Juvenil B squad.

Roldán returned to Alba in the summer of 2021, being initially assigned to the reserves in Tercera División RFEF. He made his senior debut with the side on 4 September of that year, coming on as a second-half substitute in a 2–1 away loss against CD Guadalajara, and featured in a further 26 appearances during the season as they suffered relegation.

Roldán made his first team debut for Albacete on 27 May 2023, replacing Riki in a 2–1 Segunda División home win over CD Mirandés. On 10 July of the following year, he moved to another reserve team, Elche CF Ilicitano in Segunda Federación.
