= Rodri (footballer, born 2003) =

Spanish footballer

Personal information
- Full name: Rodrigo Alonso Martín
- Date of birth: 4 January 2003 (age 23)
- Place of birth: Castellón de la Plana, Spain
- Height: 1.72 m (5 ft 8 in)
- Position: Midfielder

Team information
- Current team: Moreirense
- Number: 21

Youth career
- 2009–2010: Castellón
- 2010–2019: Villarreal
- 2019–2020: Roda
- 2020–2021: Villarreal

Senior career*
Years	Team	Apps	(Gls)
2021–2022	Villarreal C	34	(0)
2022–2025	Villarreal B	78	(1)
2023	→ Albacete (loan)	10	(0)
2025–	Moreirense	26	(3)

International career
2019	Spain U16	5	(0)
2019	Spain U17	3	(0)
2021–2022	Spain U19	5	(0)
- * Club domestic league appearances and goals as of 25 May 2026

Rodrigo Alonso Martín (born 4 January 2003), commonly known as Rodri, is a Spanish professional footballer who plays as a midfielder for Primeira Liga club Moreirense.

== Club career ==
Born in Castellón de la Plana, Valencian Community, Rodri joined Villarreal CF's youth setup in 2010, from hometown side CD Castellón. He made his senior debut with the C-team on 5 September 2021, starting in a 1–0 Tercera División RFEF away win over Callosa Deportiva CF.

On 11 December 2021, Rodri renewed his contract with the Yellow Submarine until 2025. He first appeared with the reserves the following 9 January, starting in a 2–1 Primera División RFEF away loss against Algeciras CF.

Rodri made his professional on 3 September 2022, coming on as a half-time substitute for Carlo Adriano in the B-side's 3–0 home win over CD Mirandés in the Segunda División. The following 27 January, he was loaned to fellow second tier side Albacete Balompié for the remainder of the season.

On 11 June 2025, Rodri moved to Portugal, signing a three-year contract with Primeira Liga club Moreirense.
