= Flavien Enzo Boyomo =

French footballer (born 2001)

Personal information
- Full name: Flavien Enzo Thiédort Boyomo
- Date of birth: 7 October 2001 (age 25)
- Place of birth: Toulouse, France
- Height: 1.84 m (6 ft 0 in)
- Position: Centre-back

Team information
- Current team: Osasuna
- Number: 22

Youth career
- Toulouse
- 2016–2020: Blackburn Rovers

Senior career*
Years	Team	Apps	(Gls)
2020–2023	Albacete	93	(2)
2023–2024	Valladolid	41	(1)
2024–	Osasuna	64	(3)

International career^{‡}
2024–	Cameroon	9	(1)
- * Club domestic league appearances and goals as of 27 May 2026 ‡ National team caps and goals as of 4 January 2026

Flavien Enzo Thiédort Boyomo (born 7 October 2001) is a professional footballer who plays as a centre-back for La Liga club Osasuna. Born in France, he represents the Cameroon national team.

== Early life ==
Born in Toulouse, Boyomo is Cameroonian by descent. He acquired French nationality on 30 May 2003, through the collective effect of his father's naturalization.

== Club career ==
=== Early career ===
Boyomo played in the youth sector of home-town club Toulouse, before joining Blackburn Rovers' Academy in 2016. He progressed through the English club's youth setup, but ultimately left in June 2020, after failing to agree new terms.

=== Albacete ===
After leaving Blackburn, in August 2020 Boyomo joined Spanish club Albacete Balompié, being initially assigned to their reserve team in Tercera División. He made his first team debut on 26 September 2020, starting in a 1–0 away league loss against CF Fuenlabrada.

Boyomo scored his first professional goal on 25 October 2020, netting the opener in a 2–1 home defeat of Rayo Vallecano. On 23 December, he renewed his contract until 2024.

During the 2022-23 season, he was Albacete's fourth player for total game time, having collected 39 appearances (38 of which as a starter) and one goal.

=== Valladolid ===
On 7 July 2023, Boyomo joined Segunda División side Real Valladolid for a reported fee of 1.2 million euros plus add-ons, signing a four-year contract with the newly relegated club. He was a first-choice during the campaign, as the club achieved promotion to La Liga.

Boyomo made his debut in the main category of Spanish football on 19 August 2024, starting in a 1–0 home win over RCD Espanyol.

=== Osasuna ===
On 29 August 2024, Boyomo signed a five-year contract with CA Osasuna in the top tier, for a fee of €5 million plus a 500,000 add-on and a 10% over the profit of a future transfer.

== International career ==
In March 2023, Boyomo received his first call-up to the Cameroonian senior national team by head coach Rigobert Song for both the 2023 Africa Cup of Nations qualification matches against Namibia.

== Career statistics ==
=== Club ===
As of match played 13 December 2025

Appearances and goals by club, season and competition
Club	Season	League			Copa del Rey		Other		Total	
Club	Season	Division	Apps	Goals	Apps	Goals	Apps	Goals	Apps	Goals!
Albacete	2020-21	Segunda División	31	1	1	0	—		32	1
Albacete	2021-22	Primera Federación	25	0	2	0	2 (Note: Appearance(s) in Primera División RFEF play-offs)	0	29	0
Albacete	2022-23	Segunda División	37	1	0	0	2 (Note: Appearance(s) in Segunda División Promotion play-offs)	0	39	1
Albacete	Total		93	2	3	0	4	0	100	2
Valladolid	2023-24	Segunda División	38	1	1	0	—		39	1
Valladolid	2024-25	La Liga	3	0	0	0	—		3	0
Valladolid	Total		41	1	1	0	—		42	1
Osasuna	2024–25	La Liga	34	2	3	0	—		37	2
Osasuna	2025–26	La Liga	16	0	0	0	—		16	0
Osasuna	Total		50	2	3	0	—		53	2
Career total			184	5	7	0	4	0	195	5

=== International ===
As of match played 4 January 2026

Appearances and goals by national team and year
National team	Year	Apps	Goals
Cameroon	2024	1	0
Cameroon	2025	7	1
Cameroon	2026	1	0
Total		9	1

=== International goals ===
Scores and results list Cameroon's goal tally first.

No	Date	Venue	Opponent	Score	Result	Competition	Ref(s)
1	6 June 2025	Marrakesh Stadium Annexe, Marrakesh, Morocco	Uganda	1–0	3–0	Friendly	
