= Manu Fuster =

Spanish footballer

Personal information
- Full name: Manuel Fuster Lázaro
- Date of birth: 22 October 1997 (age 29)
- Place of birth: Valencia, Spain
- Height: 1.69 m (5 ft 7 in)
- Position: Attacking midfielder

Team information
- Current team: Las Palmas
- Number: 14

Youth career
- Don Bosco
- Valencia
- Huracán

Senior career*
Years	Team	Apps	(Gls)
2016–2017	Olímpic Xàtiva	33	(10)
2017–2019	Guijuelo	64	(9)
2019–2024	Albacete	177	(33)
2024–	Las Palmas	70	(10)
- * Club domestic league appearances and goals as of 3 June 2026

Manuel "Manu" Fuster Lázaro (born 22 October 1997) is a Spanish professional footballer who plays as an attacking midfielder for Segunda División side Las Palmas.

== Career ==
=== Early career ===
Fuster was born in Valencia, and was a Huracán Valencia CF youth graduate. On 23 July 2016, he signed for Tercera División side CD Olímpic de Xàtiva, and made his senior debut on 21 August by starting in a 2–0 away win against CD Buñol.

Fuster scored his first senior goal on 28 August 2016, netting the opener in a 2–0 home defeat of Muro CF. The following 4 August, after scoring 11 goals as his side missed out promotion in the play-offs, he joined CD Guijuelo in Segunda División B.

=== Albacete ===
On 22 July 2019, Fuster agreed to a four-year contract with Albacete Balompié in Segunda División. He made his professional debut on 18 August, starting in a match against SD Huesca. He scored his first professional goal on 9 February 2020, netting a last-minute equalizer in a 1–1 home draw against SD Ponferradina. A regular starter in the 2020–21 season as the club suffered relegation, he was Alba's top goalscorer with 12 goals in the following campaign, as the club achieved promotion back from Primera División RFEF.

Throughout the 2023–24 season, Fuster scored eight goals and nine assists in 41 matches in all competitions for Albacete, becoming the league's second top assist-man. He played a total of 193 matches for the club, scoring 34 goals in the process.

=== Las Palmas ===
On 21 June 2024, it was announced that Fuster would join La Liga club Las Palmas on 1 July, signing a four-year contract with the club.
