= Álvaro Rodríguez (footballer, born 1994) =

Spanish footballer

Personal information
- Full name: Álvaro Rodríguez Pérez
- Date of birth: 22 July 1994 (age 32)
- Place of birth: Leganés, Spain
- Height: 1.81 m (5 ft 11 in)
- Position: Right back

Team information
- Current team: Eibar
- Number: 22

Youth career
- Moraleja de Enmedio

Senior career*
Years	Team	Apps	(Gls)
2013–2014	Moraleja de Enmedio	26	(16)
2014–2016	Parla	67	(2)
2016–2017	Alcorcón B	27	(2)
2017–2018	Alcobendas	10	(1)
2018	Rayo Majadahonda	3	(0)
2018–2019	Lorca	37	(3)
2019–2020	Murcia	25	(0)
2020–2022	Burgos	57	(1)
2022–2025	Albacete	91	(7)
2025–	Eibar	29	(3)
- * Club domestic league appearances and goals as of 6 June 2026

Álvaro Rodríguez Pérez (born 22 July 1994) is a Spanish footballer who plays as a right back for SD Eibar.

== Club career ==
Born in Leganés, Madrid, Rodríguez made his senior debut with EMF Moraleja de Enmedio in 2013, in the Primera Categoría (sixth division). In the following year, he moved to Tercera División team AD Parla.

In July 2016, Rodríguez joined AD Alcorcón and was immediately assigned to the B-team also in the fourth division. Roughly one year later, he moved to Fútbol Alcobendas Sport in the same category.

On 5 January 2018, Rodríguez signed for Segunda División B side CF Rayo Majadahonda. A backup to Rubén Valverde, he contributed with three appearances as his side achieved promotion to Segunda División for the first time ever, but moved to Lorca FC, which suffered administrative relegation to the fourth tier, on 18 August.

On 15 July 2019, Rodríguez agreed to a deal with Real Murcia back in the third division. The following 16 June, he joined fellow league team Burgos CF, and helped the latter side in their promotion to the second tier, now as a regular starter.

Rodríguez made his professional debut on 15 August 2021, starting in a 0–1 away draw against Sporting de Gijón. He scored his first goal as a professional on 24 October, netting his team's third in a 3–1 home win over SD Huesca.

On 19 July 2022, Rodríguez signed a two-year contract with Albacete Balompié, newly promoted to the second division. On 23 May of the following year, he renewed his link until 2026.

On 8 August 2025, Rodríguez terminated his contract with Alba, and joined fellow league team SD Eibar on a two-year deal the following day.
