= Julio Alonso (footballer) =

Spanish footballer

Personal information
- Full name: Julio Alonso Sosa
- Date of birth: 14 December 1998 (age 27)
- Place of birth: Terrassa, Spain
- Height: 1.70 m (5 ft 7 in)
- Position: Left-back

Team information
- Current team: Kalamata
- Number: 17

Youth career
- Jàbac Terrassa
- 2014–2016: Damm
- 2016–2017: Betis

Senior career*
Years	Team	Apps	(Gls)
2017–2021	Betis B	100	(2)
2021–2024	Albacete	102	(1)
2024–2025	Mirandés	31	(0)
2025–2026	Huesca	30	(0)
2026–	Kalamata	5	(0)
- * Club domestic league appearances and goals as of 20 September 2026

Julio Alonso Sosa (born 14 December 1998) is a Spanish professional footballer who plays as a left-back for Super League Greece club Kalamata.

== Club career ==
Born in Terrassa, Barcelona, Catalonia, Alonso joined Real Betis' youth setup in 2016, after representing CF Damm and UFB Jàbac Terrassa. He made his senior debut with the reserves on 27 August 2017, coming on as a second-half substitute for Redru in a 4–1 Segunda División B away loss against Real Balompédica Linense.

Alonso immediately became a regular starter for the B-team, suffering relegation to Tercera División in his first season but achieving promotion back in his third; he scored his first senior goal for the side on 29 September 2019, netting the B's third in a 4–1 away routing of Córdoba CF B. On 17 June 2021, he signed a two-year contract with Albacete Balompié, freshly relegated to Primera División RFEF.

A first-choice for Alba as the club returned to Segunda División at first attempt, Alonso made his professional debut on 15 August 2022, starting in a 2–1 away win against CD Lugo. Regularly used, he left the club on 30 June 2024 as his contract expired.

On 2 August 2024, Alonso agreed to a one-year deal with CD Mirandés in the second division. On 27 June of the following year, he moved to fellow league team SD Huesca.

On 4 June 2026, after Huesca's relegation, Alonso moved abroad and joined Super League Greece side Kalamata FC on a two-year contract.
