= Diego Altube =

Spanish footballer (born 2000)

Diego Altube Suárez
Personal information
- Full name: Diego Altube Suárez
- Date of birth: 22 February 2000 (age 26)
- Place of birth: Madrid, Spain
- Height: 1.88 m (6 ft 2 in)
- Position: Goalkeeper

Team information
- Current team: Feirense
- Number: 26

Youth career
- 2006–2010: Betis Valladolid
- 2010–2016: Real Valladolid
- 2016–2019: Real Madrid

Senior career*
Years	Team	Apps	(Gls)
2019–2020	Real Madrid B	14	(0)
2020–2022	Real Madrid	0	(0)
2021–2022	→ Fuenlabrada (loan)	24	(0)
2022–2024	Albacete	18	(0)
2024–2025	Zamora	5	(0)
2025–	Feirense	15	(0)
- * Club domestic league appearances and goals as of 19 June 2026

Diego Altube Suárez (born 22 February 2000) is a Spanish footballer who plays as a goalkeeper for Liga Portugal 2 club Feirense.

== Club career ==
Born in Madrid, Altube represented Betis Valladolid and Real Valladolid as a youth before joining Real Madrid's La Fábrica in 2016, aged 16. In August 2019, he was promoted to the reserves in Segunda División B, while also being a third-choice behind Thibaut Courtois and Alphonse Areola in the first team.

Altube made his senior debut with Castilla on 25 August 2019, starting in a 1–1 away draw against Las Rozas CF. After sharing the starting spot with Javier Belman, he spent the 2020–21 season almost entirely with the main squad, being constantly called up to matches by manager Zinedine Zidane, but was always an unused substitute.

On 9 July 2021, Altube was loaned to Segunda División side CF Fuenlabrada for the 2021–22 campaign. He made his professional debut on 15 August, starting in a 1–2 home loss against CD Tenerife.

On 18 July 2022, Altube signed a two-year contract with Albacete Balompié, newly promoted to the second level.

On 1 August 2024, Altube joined Primera Federación-promoted club Zamora.

On 2 July 2025, Altube moved abroad for the first time in his career and signed with Feirense in Liga Portugal 2.

== Personal life ==
Altube's older brother Alejandro is also a footballer. A forward, he was born in Valladolid and made his senior debut with CD Betis Valladolid.
