= Mohammed Djetei =

Cameroonian footballer

Personal information
- Full name: Mohammed Djetei
- Date of birth: 18 August 1994 (age 32)
- Place of birth: Yaoundé, Cameroon
- Height: 1.85 m (6 ft 1 in)
- Position: Centre-back

Team information
- Current team: Huesca

Senior career*
Years	Team	Apps	(Gls)
2012–2014	International Sporting		
2015–2016	Union Douala		
2016–2019	Gimnàstic	32	(0)
2019–2021	Córdoba	39	(4)
2021–2024	Albacete	92	(3)
2024–2026	Maccabi Netanya	35	(1)
2026–	Huesca	0	(0)

International career^{‡}
- Cameroon U17
- Cameroon U20
2015–	Cameroon A'	7	(0)
2016–2017	Cameroon	11	(0)
Medal record
Men's football
Representing Cameroon
Africa Cup of Nations
Winner	2017 Gabon
- * Club domestic league appearances and goals as of 3 January 2026 ‡ National team caps and goals as of 1 January 2024

Mohammed Djetei Camara (born 18 August 1994) is a Cameroonian footballer who plays as a central defender for Spanish club Huesca and the Cameroon national team.

== Club career ==
Born in Yaoundé, Djetei made his senior debut with International Sporting Club of Douala in 2012. In 2014, he moved to Union Douala, after a partnership between both clubs was established.

On 4 July 2016, Djetei signed a four-year deal with Spanish Segunda División side Gimnàstic de Tarragona. He made his debut for the club on 12 October, starting in a 1–1 Copa del Rey away draw against Rayo Vallecano (5–4 win on penalties).

Djetei made his debut in the second level on 6 November 2016, playing the full 90 minutes in a 1–0 away win against CD Mirandés. In August of the following year, during a pre-season match against Real Zaragoza, he suffered a serious knee injury.

On 2 September 2019, Djetei signed a contract with Segunda División B side Córdoba CF.

== International career ==
On 18 October 2015, Djetei made his international debut with a local team of Cameroon, after starting in a 0–0 2016 African Nations Championship qualification home draw against Congo. He also made the 23-man list for the final tournament, all teams being consisted exclusively of players playing in their African homecountries.

On 30 May 2016, Djetei made his full international debut, appearing in a 2–3 friendly away loss against France after coming on as a late substitute for Aurélien Chedjou at the Stade de la Beaujoire in Nantes. The following 5 January, he was included in Hugo Broos' 23-man squad ahead of the 2017 Africa Cup of Nations, being used as a backup as his side was crowned champions.

== Honours ==
Cameroon

- Africa Cup of Nations: 2017
