= Juan María Alcedo =

Spanish footballer (born 2001)

Personal information
- Full name: Juan María Alcedo Serrano
- Date of birth: 5 February 2001 (age 25)
- Place of birth: Rota, Spain
- Height: 1.78 m (5 ft 10 in)
- Position: Left-back

Team information
- Current team: Torreense

Youth career
- 2011–2014: Rota
- 2014–2016: Sanluqueño
- 2016–2020: Sevilla

Senior career*
Years	Team	Apps	(Gls)
2020	Sevilla C	1	(0)
2020–2022	Sevilla B	57	(0)
2022–2025	Albacete	51	(2)
2023–2024	→ Mirandés (loan)	30	(1)
2025–2026	Córdoba	13	(0)
2026–	Torreense	0	(0)

International career
2019	Spain U18	4	(0)
- * Club domestic league appearances and goals as of 6 June 2026

Juan María Alcedo Serrano (born 5 February 2001) is a Spanish footballer who plays as a left-back for Portuguese club SCU Torreense.

== Club career ==
Born in Rota, Andalusia, Alcedo joined Sevilla FC's youth setup in 2016, after representing Atlético Sanluqueño CF and CD Rota. He made his senior debut with the reserves on 1 November 2020, coming on as a late substitute in a 1–1 Segunda División B away draw against Real Murcia.

On 7 July 2022, Alcedo signed a three-year contract with Albacete Balompié, newly-promoted to Segunda División. He made his professional debut on 20 August, replacing Maikel Mesa in a 0–0 home draw against Burgos CF.

Alcedo scored his first professional goal on 26 November 2022, netting the winner in a 2–1 home win over Racing de Santander. On 10 July of the following year, he was loaned to fellow second division side CD Mirandés for the season.

Back to Albacete in July 2024, Alcedo was unable to establish himself as a regular starter, and signed a one-year deal with fellow second division side Córdoba CF on 8 June 2025. After again being rarely used, he moved to Liga Portugal 2 side SCU Torreense on a three-year contract on 2 July 2026.
