= Juanma (footballer, born 1993) =

Spanish footballer

Personal information
- Full name: Juan Manuel García García
- Date of birth: 20 February 1993 (age 33)
- Place of birth: La Rinconada, Spain
- Height: 1.67 m (5 ft 6 in)
- Position: Forward

Team information
- Current team: Algeciras
- Number: 21

Youth career
- San José
- 2001–2012: Betis

Senior career*
Years	Team	Apps	(Gls)
2012–2013	Betis B	0	(0)
2012–2013	→ Coria (loan)	34	(5)
2013–2014	Alcalá	13	(7)
2014–2017	Betis B	119	(31)
2014	Betis	3	(0)
2017–2018	Badajoz	35	(8)
2018–2019	Marbella	32	(12)
2019–2022	Burgos	88	(23)
2022–2025	Albacete	105	(9)
2025–	Algeciras	34	(6)
- * Club domestic league appearances and goals as of 10 June 2026

Juan Manuel García García (born 20 February 1993), commonly known as Juanma, is a Spanish footballer who plays as a forward for Primera Federación club Algeciras.

== Club career ==
Born in La Rinconada, Province of Seville, Juanma played youth football for local Real Betis, and made his senior debuts while on loan at Coria CF in the 2012–13 season, in Tercera División. After the expiry of his loan he was released and joined CD Alcalá also in the fourth level.

After netting seven times in only 13 matches, Juanma returned to Betis, being initially assigned to the reserves in the same division. He appeared in his first official game with the Andalusians' main squad on 2 March 2014, coming on as a substitute for Juanfran in the 76th minute of a 1–1 La Liga away draw against Villarreal CF.

After leaving Betis in 2017, Juanma represented Segunda División B sides CD Badajoz, Marbella FC and Burgos CF, achieving promotion to Segunda División with the latter in 2021. He scored his first professional goals at the age of 28 on 5 September 2021, netting a brace in a 3–0 home win over Real Valladolid.

On 23 July 2022, Juanma signed a three-year contract with Albacete Balompié also in the second tier.
