= Riki (footballer, born 1997) =

Spanish footballer (born 1997)

Personal information
- Full name: Ricardo Rodríguez Gil Carcedo
- Date of birth: 25 September 1997 (age 29)
- Place of birth: Oviedo, Spain
- Height: 1.75 m (5 ft 9 in)
- Position: Midfielder

Team information
- Current team: Deportivo A Coruña
- Number: 14

Youth career
- Oviedo
- 2014–2015: → Astur (loan)

Senior career*
Years	Team	Apps	(Gls)
2016–2018	Oviedo B	1	(0)
2016–2017	→ Tineo (loan)	29	(3)
2017–2018	→ Marino (loan)	31	(2)
2018–2019	Langreo	32	(2)
2019–2020	Oviedo B	17	(2)
2019–2022	Oviedo	10	(0)
2021	→ Racing Santander (loan)	12	(4)
2021–2022	→ Burgos (loan)	15	(0)
2022	→ Albacete (loan)	19	(0)
2022–2026	Albacete	128	(2)
2026–	Deportivo A Coruña	16	(0)
- * Club domestic league appearances and goals as of 30 August 2026

Ricardo Rodríguez Gil Carcedo (born 25 September 1997), commonly known as Riki, is a Spanish footballer who plays as a midfielder for Deportivo de A Coruña.

== Club career ==
Born in Oviedo, Asturias, Ricky represented Real Oviedo and Astur CF as a youth. He made his senior debut with the former's reserves during the 2015–16 campaign, in the Tercera División.

Riki subsequently served loan stints at CD Tineo and Marino de Luanco before joining Segunda División B side UP Langreo on a permanent deal on 11 July 2018.

In February 2019, Riki agreed a pre-contract with former side Oviedo, effective as of 1 July; he was initially assigned back at the B-team, now in the third division. He made his first team debut on 18 August, coming on as a late substitute for Alfredo Ortuño in a 2–3 away loss against Deportivo de La Coruña in the Segunda División.

Riki was definitely promoted to the main squad for the 2020–21 campaign, but moved out on loan to third division side Racing de Santander on 22 January 2021. On 24 July, he moved to Burgos CF in the second tier, on a one-year loan deal.

On 1 February 2022, Riki was loaned to Primera División RFEF side Albacete Balompié until June. After the club's promotion to the second level, he signed a permanent deal after an obligatory buyout clause was activated; Oviedo also retained half of his economic rights.

On 13 June 2023, after being a regular starter in Alba's campaign as they missed out promotion in the play-offs, Riki renewed his link with the club until 2026. On 2 February 2026, he moved to fellow second division side Deportivo de La Coruña on a three-and-a-half-year deal.

Riki contributed with 15 appearances for Dépor during the remainder of the campaign, as the club achieved promotion to La Liga, and made his debut in that category at the age of 28 on 30 August 2026, starting in a 3–1 home win over Valencia CF.
