= Lander Olaetxea =

Spanish footballer

Personal information
- Full name: Lander Olaetxea Ibaibarriaga
- Date of birth: 12 April 1993 (age 33)
- Place of birth: Abadiño, Spain
- Height: 1.79 m (5 ft 10 1/2 in)
- Position: Attacking midfielder

Team information
- Current team: Eibar
- Number: 14

Youth career
- 2008–2012: Cultural Durango

Senior career*
Years	Team	Apps	(Gls)
2012–2015	Cultural Durango	66	(8)
2012–2013	→ Iurretako (loan)		
2015–2017	Bilbao Athletic	42	(2)
2017–2018	Gernika	33	(7)
2018–2021	Logroñés	85	(9)
2021–2022	Amorebieta	35	(2)
2022–2024	Albacete	76	(5)
2024–2025	Sporting Gijón	36	(2)
2025–	Eibar	30	(1)
- * Club domestic league appearances and goals as of 6 June 2026

Lander Olaetxea Ibaibarriaga (born 12 April 1993) is a Spanish professional footballer who plays as an attacking midfielder for SD Eibar.

== Club career ==
Born in Abadiño, Biscay, Basque Country, Olaetxea was a SCD Durango youth graduate. He made his debuts as a senior while on loan at Iurretako KT in the 2012–13 campaign, in the regional leagues.

Olaetxea renewed with Durango on 5 July 2013, after his loan expired, and subsequently became a first team regular in Tercera División. On 19 May 2015 he signed a contract with Athletic Bilbao, being assigned to the reserves in Segunda División.

On 9 November 2015 Olaetxea made his professional debut, coming on as a late substitute for Asier Villalibre in a 2–0 home win against UE Llagostera. He left the Lions in 2017, with the B-side now in the third division, and continued to appear in the category in the following years, representing Gernika Club and UD Logroñés; he helped the latter achieve a first-ever promotion to the second division in 2020, contributing with six goals.

Olaetxea scored his first professional goal on 11 April 2021, netting the game's only in an away success over CD Mirandés. On 8 July, after suffering relegation, he moved to SD Amorebieta.

On 25 July 2022, after suffering another drop, Olaetxea signed a one-year deal with Albacete Balompié. On 10 July 2024, he agreed to a one-year contract with fellow second division side Sporting de Gijón.

On 16 June 2025, Olaetxea joined SD Eibar also in division two, on a two-year deal.
