= 2020–21 Albacete Balompié season =

Albacete Balompié
2020–21 season
- Owner: Skyline International
- President: Georges Kabchi
- Head coach: Lucas Alcaraz (until 13 October); Aritz López Garai (from 14 October to 6 December); Alejandro Menéndez (from 8 December to 4 May); Francisco Noguerol (interim, from 4 May)
- Stadium: Estadio Carlos Belmonte
- Segunda División: 22nd (relegated)
- Copa del Rey: First round
- Top goalscorer: League: Alfredo Ortuño (7); All: Alfredo Ortuño (7)
Home colours	Away colours

The 2020–21 Albacete Balompié season was the club's 81st season in existence and the fourth consecutive season in the second division of Spanish football. In addition to the domestic league, Albacete participated in this season's edition of the Copa del Rey. The season covered the period from 21 July 2020 to 30 June 2021.

== Players ==
=== First-team squad ===
As of 9 February 2021

Note: Flags indicate national team as defined under FIFA eligibility rules; some limited exceptions apply. Players may hold more than one non-FIFA nationality.

No.	Pos.	Nation	Player
1	GK	ESP	Bernabé Barragán
2	DF	ESP	Álvaro Arroyo
3	DF	ESP	Fran García
4	DF	ARG	Nico Gorosito
5	MF	COL	Dani Torres
6	DF	ESP	Alberto Benito
8	FW	ESP	Manu Fuster
10	FW	UKR	Roman Zozulya
11	MF	ESP	Álvaro Jiménez
12	MF	ESP	Tana
13	GK	ESP	Tomeu Nadal (captain)
14	DF	ESP	Diego Caballo

No.	Pos.	Nation	Player
16	MF	SEN	Pape Maly Diamanka (on loan from Girona)
18	DF	ESP	Javi Jiménez (on loan from Valencia)
19	FW	ESP	Alfredo Ortuño
20	MF	AZE	Eddy Silvestre
21	MF	ESP	Álvaro Peña
23	DF	MNE	Ivan Kecojević
24	MF	CMR	Jean Jules
26	DF	ESP	Carlos Isaac (on loan from Alavés)
27	MF	ESP	Cedric Teguia (on loan from Atlético Madrid)
29	FW	ESP	Diego Vargas
35	FW	URU	Emiliano Gómez (on loan from Sassuolo)
37	DF	FRA	Flavien Enzo Boyomo

=== Reserve team ===
Note: Flags indicate national team as defined under FIFA eligibility rules; some limited exceptions apply. Players may hold more than one non-FIFA nationality.

No.	Pos.	Nation	Player
28	MF	ESP	Víctor Segura
30	MF	GHA	Abdul Awudu
32	FW	ESP	Samu Vázquez
33	GK	ESP	Ismael de Andrés

No.	Pos.	Nation	Player
34	FW	ESP	Javi Verdú
38	MF	ESP	Jesús Parada
39	MF	ECU	Emerson Espinoza (on loan from Boston River)

=== Out on loan ===
Note: Flags indicate national team as defined under FIFA eligibility rules; some limited exceptions apply. Players may hold more than one non-FIFA nationality.

No.	Pos.	Nation	Player
—	DF	ESP	Fer Navarro (on loan at Villarrobledo until 30 June 2021)
—	MF	ESP	David del Pozo (on loan at Las Rozas until 30 June 2021)
—	MF	ESP	Liberto Beltrán (on loan at UCAM Murcia until 30 June 2021)
—	MF	ESP	Pedro Sánchez (on loan at Hércules until 30 June 2021)

No.	Pos.	Nation	Player
—	MF	ESP	Chema Núñez (on loan at Real Betis B until 30 June 2021)
—	MF	VEN	Yaimil Medina (on loan at Recreativo until 30 June 2021)
—	FW	ESP	Miguel Ángel (on loan at Getafe B until 30 June 2021)
—	FW	ESP	Alfon (on loan at Celta B until 30 June 2021)

== Transfers ==
=== In ===
Date	Player	From	Type	Fee	Ref
15 August 2020	(Spain) Bernabé Barragán	(Spain) Gimnàstic de Tarragona	Transfer	Free	
29 September 2020	(Senegal) Diamanka	(Spain) Girona FC	Loan		
13 August 2020	(Spain) Javi Jiménez	(Spain) Valencia CF	Loan		

=== Out ===
Date	Player	To	Type	Fee	Ref
4 August 2020	(Spain) José Antonio Caro	(Croatia) NK Osijek	Transfer	Free	
4 August 2020	(Spain) Jon Erice	(Spain) Hércules CF	Transfer	Free	
4 August 2020	(Spain) Diego Barri	(Spain) CD Badajoz	Transfer	Free	

== Pre-season and friendlies ==
Win Draw Loss

22 August 2020 Friendly	Albacete	Cancelled	Levante	Albacete, Spain
19:30 CEST (UTC+2)				Stadium: Estadio Carlos Belmonte

28 August 2020 Friendly	Albacete	1–1	Castellón	Albacete, Spain
19:00 CEST (UTC+2)				Stadium: Ciudad Deportiva Andrés Iniesta; Attendance: 0

5 September 2020 Friendly	Albacete	0–0	Leganés	Albacete, Spain
19:30 CEST (UTC+2)				Stadium: Ciudad Deportiva Andrés Iniesta; Attendance: 0

== Competitions ==
=== Overview ===
Competition	First match	Last match	Starting round	Final position	Record							
Competition	First match	Last match	Starting round	Final position	Pld	W	D	L	GF	GA	GD	Win %
Segunda División	12 September 2020	30 May 2021	Matchday 1	22nd	42	9	11	22	30	53	−23	21.43
Copa del Rey	16 December 2020		First round	First round	1	0	0	1	0	1	−1	0.00
Total					43	9	11	23	30	54	−24	20.93

Source: Soccerway

=== Segunda División ===
==== League table ====
Pos	Team	Pld	W	D	L	GF	GA	GD	Pts	Promotion, qualification or relegation
18	Lugo	42	11	14	17	38	53	−15	47	
19	Sabadell (R)	42	11	13	18	40	48	−8	46	Relegation to Primera División RFEF
20	UD Logroñés (R)	42	11	11	20	28	53	−25	44	Relegation to Primera División RFEF
21	Castellón (R)	42	11	8	23	35	54	−19	41	Relegation to Primera División RFEF
22	Albacete (R)	42	9	11	22	30	53	−23	38	Relegation to Primera División RFEF

Source: LaLiga
Rules for classification: 1) points; 2) head-to-head points; 3) head-to-head goal difference; 4) goal difference; 5) number of goals scored
(R) Relegated

==== Results summary ====
Overall								Home						Away					
Pld	W	D	L	GF	GA	GD	Pts	W	D	L	GF	GA	GD	W	D	L	GF	GA	GD
42	9	11	22	30	53	−23	38	5	6	10	16	23	−7	4	5	12	14	30	−16

Source: La Liga

==== Results by round ====
Round	1	2	3	4	5	6	7	8	9	10	11	12	13	14	15	16	17	18	19	20	21	22	23	24	25	26	27	28	29	30	31	32	33	34	35	36	37	38	39	40	41	42
Ground	A	H	A	H	A	H	A	H	H	A	H	A	H	A	H	A	H	A	A	H	A	H	A	H	A	H	A	H	A	H	A	H	H	A	H	A	H	A	A	H	A	H
Result	L	L	L	D	L	W	D	W	D	L	D	L	L	L	L	D	L	L	W	D	W	W	W	L	L	L	D	D	L	W	L	L	L	L	W	D	L	W	D	D	L	L
Position	22	22	22	20	21	20	19	16	15	19	19	20	21	21	22	21	22	22	22	22	19	19	19	22	22	22	22	22	22	22	22	22	22	22	22	22	22	22	22	22	22	22

Source: La Liga
A = Away; H = Home; W = Win; D = Draw; L = Loss

==== Matches ====
The league fixtures were announced on 31 August 2020.

12 September 2020 1	Espanyol	3–0	Albacete	Cornellà de Llobregat
16:00 CEST (UTC+2)	Melendo 14'; Wu Lei 25'; Embarba 90+1' (pen.)	Report		Stadium: RCDE Stadium; Attendance: 0 Referee: (Spain) Saúl Ais Reig

20 September 2020 2	Albacete	0–2	Ponferradina	Albacete
18:15 CEST (UTC+2)	Kecojević (yellow card) 66' (yellow-red card) 89'; Alberto Benito (yellow card) 68'; Álvaro Peña (yellow card) 90+2'	Report	Sidibé (yellow card) 19'; Manu Hernando (yellow card) 34'; Yuri 42'; Pablo Valcarce 71'	Stadium: Estadio Carlos Belmonte; Attendance: 0 Referee: (Spain) Francisco Hernández Maeso

26 September 2020 3	Fuenlabrada	1–0	Albacete	Fuenlabrada
20:30 CEST (UTC+2)	Antonio Cristian (yellow card) 56'; Ciss 65'; Mikel Iribas (yellow card) 90+4'	Report	Boyomo (yellow card) 23'; Ortuño (yellow card) 69'; Zozulya (yellow card) 72'	Stadium: Estadio Fernando Torres; Attendance: 0 Referee: (Spain) Luis Milla Alvendiz

3 October 2020 4	Albacete	1–1	Real Oviedo	Albacete
18:15 CEST (UTC+2)	Gorosito (yellow card) 10'; Manu Fuster (yellow card) 13'; Kecojević (yellow card) 19'; Diamanka 55'; Álvaro Jiménez (yellow card) 74'; Azamoum (yellow card) 88'	Report	Alejandro Arribas 11' (red card) 21'; Juanjo Nieto (yellow card) 53' (yellow-red card) 64'; Edgar González (yellow card) 54'; Christian Fernández (yellow card) 85'; Tejera (yellow card) 90+3'	Stadium: Estadio Carlos Belmonte; Attendance: 0 Referee: (Spain) Rafael Sánchez López

11 October 2020 5	Real Zaragoza	1–0	Albacete	Zaragoza
18:00 CEST (UTC+2)	Íñigo Eguaras (yellow card) 65'; Sergio Bermejo (yellow card) 68'; Pichu Atienza (yellow card) 75'; Narváez 88'	Report	Gorosito (yellow card) 44'; Javi Navarro (yellow card) 73'	Stadium: La Romareda; Attendance: 0 Referee: (Spain) Alejandro Muñiz Ruiz

17 October 2020 6	Albacete	3–0	Sabadell	Albacete
16:00 CEST (UTC+2)	Álvaro Arroyo 34'; Israfilov (yellow card) 51'; Álvaro Peña 52'; Zozulya 62' (pen.)	Report	Aleix Coch (yellow card) 61'	Stadium: Estadio Carlos Belmonte; Attendance: 0 Referee: (Spain) Saúl Ais Reig

22 October 2020 7	Mallorca	0–0	Albacete	Palma de Mallorca
19:00 CEST (UTC+2)	Sedlar (yellow card) 32'; Cufré (yellow card) 45+1'; Ndiaye (yellow card) 51'	Report	Álvaro Jiménez (yellow card) 32'; Álvaro Arroyo (yellow card) 87'	Stadium: Visit Mallorca Stadium; Attendance: 0 Referee: (Spain) Juan Pulido Santana

25 October 2020 8	Albacete	2–1	Rayo Vallecano	Albacete
20:30 CEST (UTC+2)	Boyomo 43'; Israfilov 47'; Kecojević (yellow card) 60'; Fran García (yellow card) 83'	Report	Catena (yellow card) 50'; Isi Palazón 80'	Stadium: Estadio Carlos Belmonte; Attendance: 0 Referee: (Spain) Daniel Trujillo Suárez

28 October 2020 9	Albacete	1–1	Las Palmas	Albacete
19:00 CEST (UTC+2)	Fran García 37'; Chema (yellow card) 90+2'; Israfilov (yellow card) 90+7'	Report	Javi Castellano (yellow card) 45+3'; Fabio González (yellow card) 53'; Eric Curbelo (yellow card) 71'; Maikel Mesa (yellow card) 83' (goal) 90' (pen.); Jonathan (yellow card) 90+3'	Stadium: Estadio Carlos Belmonte; Attendance: 0 Referee: (Spain) David Gálvez Rascón

31 October 2020 10	FC Cartagena	3–1	Albacete	Cartagena
16:00 CEST (UTC+2)	Rubén Castro 8' 41'; David Andújar 32'; de la Bella (yellow card) 64'; Carrasquilla (yellow card) 86'	Report	Álvaro Jiménez (yellow card) 26'; Israfilov (yellow card) 31'; Álvaro Peña (yellow card) 57'; Azamoum (yellow card) 59'; Liberto Beltrán 66'	Stadium: Estadio Cartagonova; Attendance: 0 Referee: (Spain) Álvaro Moreno Aragón

6 November 2020 11	Albacete	0–0	Leganés	Albacete
21:00 CEST (UTC+2)	Israfilov (yellow card) 24'; Zozulya (yellow card) 26'; Alberto Benito (yellow card) 73'; Álvaro Peña (yellow card) 77'; Diamanka (yellow card) 84'	Report	Rubén Pérez (yellow card) 90+2'	Stadium: Estadio Carlos Belmonte; Attendance: 0 Referee: (Spain) Eduardo Prieto Iglesias

14 November 2020 12	Lugo	1–0	Albacete	Lugo
18:30 CEST (UTC+2)	Edu Campabadal (red card) 40'; Manu Barreiro 85' (pen.)	Report	Gorosito (yellow card) 8'; Kecojević (yellow card) 90+4'	Stadium: Estadio Anxo Carro; Attendance: 0 Referee: (Spain) Iñaki Vicandi Garrido

23 November 2020 13	Albacete	1–2	Almería	Albacete
21:00 CEST (UTC+2)	Gorosito (yellow card) 15'; Boyomo (yellow card) 53'; Azamoum (yellow card) 70'; Álvaro Jiménez 78' (pen.) (yellow card) 83'; Tomeu Nadal (yellow card) 90+6'	Report	José Corpas 16' (pen.); Jorge Cuenca (yellow card) 26' (goal) 84'; Manu Morlanes (yellow card) 34'; Makaridze (yellow card) 77'; Samuel Costa (yellow card) 82'; Balliu (yellow card) 87'; Sergio Akieme (yellow card) 90+1'; Ramazani (yellow card) 90+2'	Stadium: Estadio Carlos Belmonte; Attendance: 0 Referee: (Spain) Juan Pulido Santana

26 November 2020 14	UD Logroñés	2–0	Albacete	Logroño
19:00 CEST (UTC+2)	Andy 10' (pen.) (yellow card) 66'; Jaime Sierra 69'; Acevedo (yellow card) 79'; Enrique Clemente (yellow card) 90'	Report	Boyomo (yellow card) 43'; Manu Fuster (yellow card) 47'	Stadium: Estadio Las Gaunas; Attendance: 0 Referee: (Spain) Oliver De La Fuente

29 November 2020 15	Albacete	0–2	Tenerife	Albacete
14:00 CEST (UTC+2)	Azamoum (yellow card) 32'; Diego Caballo (yellow card) 56'	Report	Shashoua 67'; Fran Sol 84'	Stadium: Estadio Carlos Belmonte; Attendance: 0 Referee: (Spain) Miguel Ortíz Arias

3 December 2020 16	Sporting Gijón	0–0	Albacete	Gijón
21:30 CEST (UTC+2)		Report	Kecojević (yellow card) 7'; Boyomo (yellow card) 68'; Sepp Mvondo (yellow card) 72'; Gorosito (yellow card) 87'	Stadium: El Molinón; Attendance: 0 Referee: Rubén Ávalos Barrera฿

6 December 2020 17	Albacete	0–2	Girona	Albacete
18:15 CET (UTC+2)	Zozulya (yellow card) 34'; Álvaro Arroyo (yellow card) 51'; Carlos Isaac (yellow card) 87'	Report	Kecojević 66' (o.g.); Gumbau (yellow card) 69'; Pablo Moreno 79'	Stadium: Estadio Carlos Belmonte; Attendance: 0 Referee: (Spain) David Gálvez Rascón
Note: Played Behind Closed Doors

12 December 2020 18	Castellón	3–0	Albacete	Castellón de la Plana
18:15 CET	Satrústegui (yellow card) 17'; Marc Mateu 27' (pen.); Guillem Jaime (yellow card) 31'; Carlos Delgado (yellow card) 52'; Zlatanović 83' 90+1'	Report	Sepp Mvondo (yellow card) 9'; Gorosito (yellow card) 29'; Alberto Benito (yellow card) 29'; Álvaro Jiménez (yellow card) 87' (yellow-red card) 87'; Azamoum (yellow card) 88'	Stadium: Nou Estadi Castàlia; Attendance: 0 Referee: Francisco José Hernández Maeso
Note: Played Behind Closed Doors

21 December 2020 19	Mirandés	0–2	Albacete	Miranda de Ebro
19:00 CET	Víctor Gómez (yellow card) 69'; Javi Muñoz (yellow card) 82'	Report	Diamanka 32' (yellow card) 70'; Álvaro Peña 42'; Boyomo (yellow card) 56'; Ortuño (yellow card) 90+2'	Stadium: Estadio Municipal de Anduva; Attendance: 0 Referee: Rafael Sánchez López
Note: Played Behind Closed Doors

3 January 2021 20	Albacete	1–1	Málaga	Albacete
18:15 CET	Kecojević (yellow card) 15'; Ortuño 53' (pen.)	Report	Cristian Rodríguez (yellow card) 2'; Jairo Samperio 50'; Joaquín Muñoz (yellow card) 73'	Stadium: Estadio Carlos Belmonte; Attendance: 0 Referee: Jon Ander González Esteban
Note: Played Behind Closed Doors

10 January 2021 21	Alcorcón	P–P	Albacete	Alcorcón
				Stadium: Estadio Municipal de Santo Domingo; Attendance: 0
Note: Played Behind Closed Doors

22 January 2021 22	Albacete	1–0	Real Zaragoza	Albacete
21:00 CET	Azamoum (yellow card) 13'; Manu Fuster 26' (pen.); Álvaro Arroyo (red card) 82'	Report	Alejandro Francés (yellow card) 19'; Carlos Vigaray (yellow card) 25'; Narváez (yellow card) 40'	Stadium: Estadio Carlos Belmonte; Attendance: 0 Referee: Rubén Ávalos Barrera
Note: Played Behind Closed Doors

26 January 2021 21	Alcorcón	1–2	Albacete	Alcorcón
19:00 CET	Hugo Fraile 42'; José Carlos (yellow card) 45'; Ernesto Gómez (yellow card) 52'; José León (yellow card) 68'	Report	Israfilov 30'; Sepp Mvondo (yellow card) 59'; Álvaro Jiménez 69' (pen.); Boyomo (yellow card) 78'	Stadium: Estadio Municipal de Santo Domingo; Attendance: 0 Referee: Juan Luis Pulido Santana
Note: Played Behind Closed Doors

30 January 2021 23	Real Oviedo	0–1	Albacete	Oviedo
16:00 CET	Javi Mier (yellow card) 35'; Tejera (yellow card) 73'	Report	Zozulya 58' (yellow card) 90+2'; Boyomo (yellow card) 90+6'; Gorosito (yellow card) 90+7'	Stadium: Estadio Carlos Tartiere; Attendance: 0 Referee: Aitor Gorostegui Fernández Ortega
Note: Played Behind Closed Doors

5 February 2021 24	Albacete	0–1	Mallorca	Albacete
21:00 CET	Gorosito (yellow card) 12' (yellow-red card) 37'; Sepp Mvondo (yellow card) 71'	Report	Abdón Prats (yellow card) 44'; Ruiz de Galarreta (yellow card) 45'; Ndiaye 59'; Russo (yellow card) 90+3'	Stadium: Estadio Carlos Belmonte; Attendance: 0 Referee: Álvaro Moreno Aragón
Note: Played Behind Closed Doors

14 February 2021 25	Leganés	3–1	Albacete	Leganés
18:15 CET	Rubén Pardo 18'; Robert Ibáñez 23'; Borja Bastón (yellow card) 75'; Sabin Merino 81'	Report	Fran García (yellow card) 49'; Israfilov (yellow card) 62'; Álvaro Jiménez 71'	Stadium: Estadio Municipal de Butarque; Attendance: 0 Referee: José Antonio López Toca
Note: Played Behind Closed Doors

20 February 2021 26	Albacete	0–1	Sporting Gijón	Albacete
18:15 CET	Boyomo (red card) 49'; Israfilov (yellow card) 61'; Fran García (yellow card) 77'; Cedric Teguia (yellow card) 90'	Report	Babin 31'; José Gragera (yellow card) 64'	Stadium: Estadio Carlos Belmonte; Attendance: 0 Referee: Juan Luis Pulido Santana
Note: Played Behind Closed Doors

26 February 2021 27	Sabadell	0–0	Albacete	Sabadell
19:00 CET	Cornud (yellow card) 47'; Víctor García (yellow card) 52'	Report	Alberto Benito (yellow card) 86'; Álvaro Arroyo (red card) 90'	Stadium: Estadi de la Nova Creu Alta; Attendance: 0 Referee: Saúl Ais Reig
Note: Played Behind Closed Doors

6 March 2021 28	Albacete	1–1	UD Logroñés	Albacete
20:30 CET	Alberto Benito (yellow card) 8'; Torres (yellow card) 28'; Boyomo (yellow card) 57'; Zozulya (yellow card) 70'; Fran García (yellow card) 72'; Ortuño 90+3'	Report	Nano 74'; Acevedo (yellow card) 90+1'	Stadium: Estadio Carlos Belmonte; Attendance: 0 Referee: Iosu Galech Apezteguia
Note: Played Behind Closed Doors

14 March 2021 29	Tenerife	2–0	Albacete	Santa Cruz de Tenerife
18:15 CET	Moore (yellow card) 3'; Vada (yellow card) 79'; Álex Muñoz 86' 90+2'	Report	Israfilov (yellow card) 31'; Cedric Teguia (yellow card) 38'; Álvaro Arroyo (yellow card) 64'; Tana (yellow card) 83'; Kecojević (yellow card) 87'	Stadium: Estadio Heliodoro Rodríguez López; Attendance: 0 Referee: Rafael Sánchez López
Note: Played Behind Closed Doors

22 March 2021 30	Albacete	2–0	FC Cartagena	Albacete
19:00 CET	Ortuño 21'; Torres 57'; Sepp Mvondo (yellow card) 90+2'	Report	José Jurado (yellow card) 14'; David Forniés (yellow card) 77'; Antoñito (yellow card) 80'	Stadium: Estadio Carlos Belmonte; Attendance: 0 Referee: Eduardo Prieto Iglesias
Note: Played Behind Closed Doors

28 March 2021 31	Girona	2–1	Albacete	Girona
16:00 CET	Yan Couto (yellow card) 13'; Gumbau (yellow card) 52'; Ramon Terrats (yellow card) 57'; Sylla 90+2'; Juanpe (yellow card) 90+4'; Stuani 90+5'	Report	Ortuño 68'; Alberto Benito (yellow card) 81'	Stadium: Estadi Municipal de Montilivi; Attendance: 0 Referee: David Gálvez Rascón
Note: Played Behind Closed Doors

31 March 2021 32	Albacete	0–1	Castellón	Albacete
19:00 CET	Zozulya (yellow card) 28'; Torres (yellow card) 39'	Report	Jorge Fernández 63' (yellow card) 66'	Stadium: Estadio Carlos Belmonte; Attendance: 0 Referee: Javier Iglesias Villanueva
Note: Played Behind Closed Doors

4 April 2021 33	Albacete	0–3	Espanyol	Albacete
16:00 CET	Torres (yellow card) 24'; Diamanka (yellow card) 30'	Report	Adrià Pedrosa (yellow card) 13'; Raúl de Tomás 39' 90+5'; Fernando Calero (yellow card) 49' (goal) 64'	Stadium: Estadio Carlos Belmonte; Attendance: 0 Referee: José Antonio López Toca
Note: Played Behind Closed Doors

11 April 2021 34	Málaga	2–0	Albacete	Málaga
14:00 CET	Rahmani 23'; Caye Quintana 56'	Report	Israfilov (yellow card) 33'; Manu Fuster (yellow card) 63'; Diego Vargas (yellow card) 90+1'	Stadium: La Rosaleda Stadium; Attendance: 0 Referee: Daniel Jesús Trujillo Suárez
Note: Played Behind Closed Doors

18 April 2021 35	Albacete	1–0	Mirandés	Albacete
14:00 CET	Cedric Teguia (yellow card) 71'; Ortuño 83'	Report	Víctor Gómez (yellow card) 57'	Stadium: Estadio Carlos Belmonte; Attendance: 0 Referee: Alejandro Muñíz Ruiz
Note: Played Behind Closed Doors

26 April 2021 36	Rayo Vallecano	2–2	Albacete	Madrid
19:00 CET	Saveljich 2'; Mario Suárez (yellow card) 32' (yellow-red card) 61'; Trejo (yellow card) 36'; Isi Palazón (yellow card) 67'; Joni Montiel (yellow card) 84'; Bebé (yellow card) 85' (goal) 87'; Qasmi (yellow card) 90+7'	Report	Álvaro Jiménez 62' (pen.); Manu Fuster 73'; Dani Torres (yellow card) 84'	Stadium: Campo de Fútbol de Vallecas; Attendance: 0 Referee: Daniel Ocón Arráiz
Note: Played Behind Closed Doors

3 May 2021 37	Albacete	0–1	Alcorcón	Albacete
21:00 CET	Álvaro Peña (yellow card) 53'; Israfilov (yellow card) 68'; Fran García (yellow card) 82'; Carlos Isaac (red card) 90'; Manu Fuster (red card) 90+5'	Report	Xisco 3'; Ernesto Gómez (yellow card) 82'	Stadium: Estadio Carlos Belmonte; Attendance: 0 Referee: Jon Ander González Esteban
Note: Played Behind Closed Doors

8 May 2021 38	Ponferradina	0–1	Albacete	Ponferrada
18:15 CET	Iván Rodríguez (yellow card) 47'; Adri Castellano (red card) 75'; Gaspar Panadero (yellow card) 86'; Pablo Larrea (yellow card) 90+4'; Caro (yellow card) 90+7'	Report	Javi Jiménez (yellow card) 7'; Alberto Benito (yellow card) 28'; Álvaro Jiménez 45' (pen.); Gorosito (yellow card) 58'	Stadium: Estadio El Toralín; Attendance: 0 Referee: Iosu Galech Apezteguia
Note: Played Behind Closed Doors

15 May 2021 39	Almería	1–1	Albacete	Almería
21:00 CET	José Carlos Lazo 28' (yellow card) 43'; Sergio Akieme (yellow card) 90'	Report	Ortuño 19'; Álvaro Jiménez (yellow card) 22'; Álvaro Peña (red card) 69'; Kecojević (yellow card) 72'; Carlos Isaac (yellow card) 90+3'; Bernabé Barragán (yellow card) 90+5'; Torres (yellow card) 90+7'	Stadium: Estadio de los Juegos Mediterráneos; Attendance: 0 Referee: Miguel Ángel Ortiz Arias
Note: Played Behind Closed Doors

18 May 2021 40	Albacete	1–1	Lugo	Albacete
21:30 CET	Diamanka (yellow card) 30'; Gorosito (yellow card) 39'; Ortuño 45' (yellow card) 53'	Report	Diego Alende (yellow card) 18'; José Rodríguez 25' (yellow card) 69'; Luis Ruiz (yellow card) 45+3'	Stadium: Estadio Carlos Belmonte; Attendance: 0 Referee: Daniel Jesús Trujillo Suárez
Note: Played Behind Closed Doors

24 May 2021 41	Las Palmas	3–2	Albacete	Las Palmas
21:00 CET	Araujo 9' 74' (yellow card) 75'; Jesé 41'; Eric Curbelo (yellow card) 59'; Benito Ramírez (yellow card) 81'; Edu Espiau (yellow card) 90'	Report	Tana 66'; Zozulya (yellow card) 79'; Sepp Mvondo 89'; Bernabé Barragán (yellow card) 90'	Stadium: Estadio Gran Canaria; Attendance: 0 Referee: Luis Mario Milla Alvéndiz
Note: Played Behind Closed Doors

30 May 2021 42	Albacete	1–2	Fuenlabrada	Albacete
18:30 CET	Gómez 67'	Report	Borja Garcés 44' 60'; Juanma (yellow card) 59'; Adrián Diéguez (yellow card) 85'; Rosić (yellow card) 90+3'	Stadium: Estadio Carlos Belmonte; Attendance: 0 Referee: Aitor Gorostegui Fernández Ortega
Note: Played Behind Closed Doors

=== Copa del Rey ===
16 December 2020 First round	Córdoba	1–0	Albacete	Córdoba
18:00 CET (UTC+1)	Gorosito 63' (o.g.)	Report		Stadium: Nuevo Arcángel; Referee: Javier Iglesias Villanueva
