= 2019–20 Albacete Balompié season =

Albacete Balompié
2019–20 season
- Owner: Skyline International
- President: Georges Kabchi
- Head coach: Luis Miguel Ramis (until 3 February); Lucas Alcaraz (from 3 February)
- Stadium: Estadio Carlos Belmonte
- Segunda División: 17th
- Copa del Rey: Second round
Home colours	Away colours

The 2019–20 season was Albacete Balompié's 80th season in existence and the club's third consecutive season in the second division of Spanish football. In addition to the domestic league, Albacete participated in this season's edition of the Copa del Rey. The season covered the period from 1 July 2019 to 20 July 2020.

== Players ==
=== Current squad ===
As of 1 February 2020

Note: Flags indicate national team as defined under FIFA eligibility rules; some limited exceptions apply. Players may hold more than one non-FIFA nationality.

No.	Pos.	Nation	Player
1	GK	BRA	Gabriel Brazão (on loan from Inter Milan)
2	DF	ESP	Álvaro Arroyo (Vice-Captain)
3	DF	ESP	Fran García
4	DF	ARG	Nico Gorosito
5	DF	ESP	Alberto Benito
6	MF	ESP	Diego Barri
7	MF	ESP	Néstor Susaeta (Captain)
8	FW	ESP	Manu Fuster
9	FW	ESP	David Querol (on loan from Cádiz)
10	FW	UKR	Roman Zozulya
11	MF	ESP	Álvaro Jiménez (on loan from Getafe)
12	MF	ESP	Jon Erice
13	GK	ESP	Tomeu Nadal

No.	Pos.	Nation	Player
14	DF	ESP	Diego Caballo
15	FW	PAR	Javier Acuña
16	DF	ESP	José Antonio Caro
17	MF	FRA	Karim Azamoum
18	DF	ESP	Sergio Sánchez (on loan from Cádiz)
19	MF	ESP	Pedro Sánchez
20	MF	AZE	Eddi İsrafilov
21	FW	ESP	Dani Ojeda (on loan from Leganés)
22	MF	ESP	Chema (on loan from Almería)
23	DF	MNE	Ivan Kecojević
24	MF	ESP	Maikel Mesa (on loan from Las Palmas)
38	FW	ESP	Miguel Ángel

=== Reserve team ===
Note: Flags indicate national team as defined under FIFA eligibility rules; some limited exceptions apply. Players may hold more than one non-FIFA nationality.

No.	Pos.	Nation	Player
26	MF	ESP	Víctor Segura
28	DF	ESP	Fer Navarro
29	MF	ESP	Fran Castillo
30	MF	GHA	Abdul Awudu

No.	Pos.	Nation	Player
31	GK	ESP	Adrián Rodríguez
32	MF	ESP	Álvaro Hernáiz
37	DF	ESP	Luis Poblete

=== Out on loan ===
Note: Flags indicate national team as defined under FIFA eligibility rules; some limited exceptions apply. Players may hold more than one non-FIFA nationality.

No.	Pos.	Nation	Player
—	DF	ESP	Ángel Moreno (on loan at Cultural Leonesa until 30 June 2020)
—	MF	CMR	Jean Jules Mvondo (on loan at Rayo Majadahonda until 30 June 2020)
—	MF	VEN	Yaimil Medina (on loan at Marbella until 30 June 2020)

No.	Pos.	Nation	Player
—	MF	ESP	Álvaro Peña (at Mirandés until 30 June 2020)
—	FW	ESP	Alfon (on loan at Getafe B until 30 June 2020)
—	FW	ESP	Alfredo Ortuño (on loan at Oviedo until 30 June 2020)

== Pre-season and friendlies ==
Win Draw Loss Fixtures

== Competitions ==
=== Overview ===
Competition	First match	Last match	Starting round	Final position	Record							
Competition	First match	Last match	Starting round	Final position	Pld	W	D	L	GF	GA	GD	Win %
Segunda División	August 2019	20 July 2020	Matchday 1	17th	42	13	13	16	36	46	−10	30.95
Copa del Rey	18 December 2019	11 January 2020	First round	Second round	2	1	1	0	2	1	+1	50.00
Total					44	14	14	16	38	47	−9	31.82

Last updated: 20 July 2020
Source: Competitions

=== Segunda División ===
==== League table ====
Pos	Team	Pld	W	D	L	GF	GA	GD	Pts	Promotion, qualification or relegation
15	Oviedo	42	13	14	15	49	53	−4	53 (Note: Málaga finished ahead of Oviedo on head-to-head points: Málaga 2–1 Oviedo, Oviedo 1–1 Málaga.)	
16	Lugo	42	12	16	14	43	54	−11	52 (Note: Lugo finished ahead of Albacete on head-to-head points: Albacete 0–1 Lugo, Lugo 1–0 Albacete.)	
17	Albacete	42	13	13	16	36	46	−10	52	
18	Ponferradina	42	12	15	15	45	50	−5	51 (Note: Ponferradina finished ahead of Deportivo La Coruña on head-to-head goal difference: Ponferradina 2–0 Deportivo La Coruña, Deportivo La Coruña 2–1 Ponferradina.)	
19	Deportivo La Coruña (R)	42	12	15	15	43	60	−17	51	Relegation to Segunda División B

Source: LaLiga Soccerway
Rules for classification: 1) points; 2) head-to-head points; 3) head-to-head goal difference; 4) goal difference; 5) number of goals scored
(R) Relegated

==== Results summary ====
Overall								Home						Away					
Pld	W	D	L	GF	GA	GD	Pts	W	D	L	GF	GA	GD	W	D	L	GF	GA	GD
42	13	13	16	36	46	−10	52	5	9	7	19	22	−3	8	4	9	17	24	−7

Last updated: 20 July 2020.

==== Results by round ====
Round	1	2	3	4	5	6	7	8	9	10	11	12	13	14	15	16	17	18	19	20	21	22	23	24	25	26	27	28	29	30	31	32	33	34	35	36	37	38	39	40	41	42
Ground																																										
Result																																										
Position	22	11	15	8	15	8	6	7	8	7	10	7	5	6	10	6	9	9	9	12	13	14	15	15	16	19	19	18	18	18	18	20	17	17	18	17	18	17	18	20	18	17

Updated to match(es) played on 20 July 2020. Source:
A = Away; H = Home; W = Win; D = Draw; L = Loss

==== Matches ====
The fixtures were revealed on 4 July 2019.

17 August 2019 1	Almería	3–0	Albacete	Almería
19:00 CEST (UTC+2)	Sergio Aguza 67' (pen.) 90+7'; Nkaka 82'; Rahmani (yellow card) 90+4'	Summary	Álvaro Peña (yellow card) 90+2'	Stadium: Juegos Mediterráneos; Attendance: 7,361; Referee: (Spain) Saúl Ais Reig

23 August 2019 2	Albacete	1–0	Girona	Albacete
22:00 CEST (UTC+2)	Álvaro Jiménez (yellow card) 35'; Zozulya (yellow card) 74'; Alcalá 81' (o.g.)	Report	Ignasi Miquel (yellow card) 25'; Juanpe (yellow card) 61'; Samuel Sáiz (yellow card) 84'	Stadium: Carlos Belmonte; Attendance: 7,595; Referee: (Spain) Santiago Varón Aceitón

1 September 2019 3	Sporting Gijón	2–0	Albacete	Gijón
18:00 CET (UTC+1)	Borja López (yellow card) 17'; Pedro Díaz 56'; Đurđević (yellow card) 70'; Manu García 75'	Summary	Roberto Olabe (yellow card) 65'; Azamoum (yellow card) 79'; Zozulya (yellow card) 90'	Stadium: El Molinón; Attendance: 19,590; Referee: (Spain) Daniel Ocón Arráiz

7 September 2019 4	Deportivo La Coruña	0–1	Albacete	A Coruña
16:00 CEST (UTC+2)	David Simón (yellow card) 75'	Summary	Kecojević (yellow card) 27'; Roberto Olabe (yellow card) 39'; Barri (yellow card) 57'; Néstor Susaeta 76' (pen.); Fran García (yellow card) 77' (yellow-red card) 83'	Stadium: Abanca-Riazor; Attendance: 15,247; Referee: (Spain) Luis Milla Alvendiz

15 September 2019 5	Albacete	0–4	Tenerife	Albacete
12:00 CEST (UTC+2)	Prdro (yellow card) 35'; Roberto Olabe (yellow card) 37'; José Antonio Caro (yellow card) 52'; Kecojević (yellow card) 55'; Álvaro Jiménez (yellow card) 77'; Zozulya (yellow card) 82'	Summary	Álex Bermejo 1'; Mazáň 13'; Alberto Jiménez (yellow card) 26'; Miérez (yellow card) 47' (goal) 72'; Ortolá (yellow card) 68'; Dani Gómez 88'	Stadium: Estadio Carlos Belmonte; Attendance: 7,875; Referee: (Spain) Álvaro Moreno Aragón

18 September 2019 6	Huesca	0–1	Albacete	Huesca
19:00 CEST (UTC+2)	Javi Galán (yellow card) 63'	Report	Néstor Susaeta 4' (pen.) (yellow card) 90+3'; Alberto Benito (yellow card) 13'; Zozulya (yellow card) 25'; Pedro (yellow card) 31'; Israfilov (yellow card) 32'; Acuña (yellow card) 61'; Barri (yellow card) 80'	Stadium: El Alcoraz; Attendance: 6,414; Referee: (Spain) Rubén Ávalos Barrera

21 September 2019 7	Albacete	1–0	Málaga	Albacete
20:30 CEST (UTC+2)	Manaj 66' (yellow card) 67'; Álvaro Jiménez (yellow card) 73'	Report	Renato Santos (yellow card) 65'; Luis Muñoz (yellow card) 79'	Stadium: Estadio Carlos Belmonte; Attendance: 8,110; Referee: (Spain) Daniel Trujillo Suárez

27 September 2019 8	Las Palmas	3–2	Albacete	Las Palmas
21:00 CEST (UTC+2)	Narváez (yellow card) 26'; Jonathan Viera 31' 45+1'; Pekhart 68' (yellow card) 85'; Pedri (yellow card) 84'; Lemos (yellow card) 90+6'	Report	Tomeu Nadal (yellow card) 44'; Álvaro Arroyo (yellow card) 47'; Capezzi (yellow card) 62'; Fran García (yellow card) 63'; Zozulya 86'; Acuña 90+6'	Stadium: Estadio Gran Canaria; Attendance: 9,396; Referee: (Spain) Gorka Sagués Oscoz

1 October 2019 9	Albacete	0–0	Racing Santander	Albacete
19:00 CEST (UTC+2)	Barri (yellow card) 13'; Manaj (yellow card) 87'	Report	Lombardo (yellow card) 30'; Mario Ortiz (yellow card) 43'; Nkaka (yellow card) 53'; Cejudo (yellow card) 80'; Alexis (yellow card) 90+3'	Stadium: Estadio Carlos Belmonte; Attendance: 7,891; Referee: (Spain) Víctor Areces Franco

4 October 2019 10	Alcorcón	0–1	Albacete	Alcorcón
21:00 CEST (UTC+2)	Unai Elgezabal (yellow card) 25'; Carlos Pomares (yellow card) 59'	Report	Manaj (yellow card) 26' (goal) 67' (pen.); Azamoum (yellow card) 38'; Kecojević (yellow card) 50'; Fran Garcia (yellow card) 70'	Stadium: Estadio Municipal de Santo Domingo; Attendance: 2,391; Referee: (Spain) Iñaki Vicandi Garrido

13 October 2019 11	Albacete	1–2	Real Oviedo	Albacete
18:00 CEST (UTC+2)	Karim (yellow card) 26'; Dani Ojeda 32'; Barri (yellow card) 39'	Report	Omar Ramos (yellow card) 23'; Lolo González (yellow card) 60'; Sangalli 75'; Borja Sánchez 89'	Stadium: Carlos Belmonte; Attendance: 9,115; Referee: (Spain) Juan Luis Pulido Santana (Las Palmas)

20 October 2019 12	Fuenlabrada	0–1	Albacete	Fuenlabrada
12:00 CEST (UTC+2)	Chico (yellow card) 52'; Iban Salvador (yellow card) 71'	Report	Fran Garcia (yellow card) 36'; Zozulya 59'; Álvaro Arroyo (yellow card) 75'; Alberto Benito (yellow card) 87'; Tomeu Nadal (yellow card) 90'	Stadium: Fernando Torres; Attendance: 4,973; Referee: (Spain) Jon González Esteban

25 October 2019 13	Albacete	1–0	Cádiz	Albacete
21:00 CEST (UTC+2)	Kecojević (yellow card) 80'; Pedro (yellow card) 84'; Zozulya 90+3'	Report	Bodiger (yellow card) 51'; Alejo (yellow card) 87'	Stadium: Carlos Belmonte; Attendance: 8,857; Referee: (Spain) José Antonio López Toca

1 November 2019 14	Numancia	1–0	Albacete	Soria
12:00 CET (UTC+1)	Néstor Albiach (yellow card) 71'; Alberto Escassi 82'; Guillermo Fernández (yellow card) 90'	Report	José Caro (yellow card) 1'; Azamoum (yellow card) 13'; Manu Fuster (yellow card) 53'; Roberto Olabe (yellow card) 63' (yellow-red card) 90+4'	Stadium: Los Pajaritos; Attendance: 3,235; Referee: (Spain) Miguel Ortíz Arias

9 November 2019 15	Albacete	0–1	Lugo	Albacete
18:00 CET (UTC+1)	Israfilov (yellow card) 54'; Kecojević (yellow card) 61'	Report	Fernando Seoane (yellow card) 41'; Álex López 80'; Cristian (yellow card) 90+3'	Stadium: Estadio Carlos Belmonte; Attendance: 7,827; Referee: (Spain) Iñaki Vicandi Garrido

16 November 2019 16	Real Zaragoza	0–1	Albacete	Zaragoza
21:00 CET (UTC+1)	Guitián (yellow card) 33'	Report	Azamoum (yellow card) 25'; Capezzi (yellow card) 66'; Eddy 90+4'	Stadium: La Romareda; Attendance: 20,036; Referee: (Spain) Saúl Ais Reig

24 November 2019 17	Albacete	1–2	Mirandés	Albacete
16:00 CET (UTC+1)	Pedro 4'; Leonardo Capezzi (yellow card) 21'; Néstor Susaeta (yellow card) 37'; Roberto Olabe (yellow card) 47'; Israfilov (yellow card) 53'	Report	Iñigo Vicente 15'; Sergio González 20'; Jon Guridi (yellow card) 53'; Enric Franquesa (yellow card) 90+1'	Stadium: Estadio Carlos Belmonte; Attendance: 7,817; Referee: (Spain) Daniel Trujillo Suárez

30 November 2019 18	Ponferradina	1–1	Albacete	Ponferrada
18:00 CET (UTC+1)	Hamani (yellow card) 44'; Yuri 73' (pen.)	Report	Acuña 9' (yellow card) 45+1'; Azamoum (yellow card) 27'; Kecojević (yellow card) 37'	Stadium: Estadio El Toralín; Attendance: 5,054; Referee: (Spain) Aitor Gorostegui Fernández

6 December 2019 19	Albacete	1–1	Extremadura	Albacete
CET (UTC+1)

4 January 2020 22	Tenerife	4–2	Albacete	Santa Cruz de Tenerife
18:00 CET (UTC+1)		Report		Stadium: Heliodoro Rodríguez López

14 January 2020 23	Albacete	1–1	Fuenlabrada	Albacete
19:00 CET (UTC+1)		Report		Stadium: Carlos Belmonte

18 January 2020 24	Lugo	1–0	Albacete	Lugo
18:15 CET (UTC+1)				Stadium: Anxo Carro

26 January 2020 25	Albacete	0–1	Deportivo La Coruña	Albacete
16:00 CET (UTC+1)				Stadium: Carlos Belmonte

2 February 2020 26	Real Oviedo	3–1	Albacete	Oviedo
20:30 CET (UTC+1)	Tejera 40' (yellow card) 69'; Bolaño (yellow card) 43'; Ibra (yellow card) 43' (goal) 57', 86'; Juanjo Nieto (yellow card) 54'; Carlos Hernández (yellow card) 66'	Report	Jon Erice (yellow card) 22'; Tomeu Nadal (yellow card) 41'; Pedro Sánchez 45' (yellow card) 47'	Stadium: Carlos Tartiere; Attendance: 17,735; Referee: Aitor Gorostegui Fernández-Ortega

9 February 2020 27	Albacete	1–1	Ponferradina	Albacete
12:00 CET (UTC+1)				Stadium: Carlos Belmonte

22 February 2020 29	Albacete	2–1	Numancia	Albacete
20:30 CET (UTC+1)		Report		Stadium: Estadio Carlos Belmonte

29 February 2020 30	Albacete	1–1	Rayo Vallecano	Albacete
20:30 CET (UTC+1)	Pedro 44'	Report	Qasmi 32'	Stadium: Carlos Belmonte; Attendance: 8,543; Referee: Jorge Figueroa Vázquez

7 March 2020 31	Girona	1–1	Albacete	Girona
16:00 CET (UTC+1)		Report		Stadium: Montilivi

10 June 2020 20	Rayo Vallecano	1–0	Albacete	Madrid
20:00 CEST (UTC+2)	Advíncula 61'	Report		Stadium: Vallecas; Attendance: 0 Referee: José Antonio López Toca

14 June 2020 32	Albacete	0–1	Almería	Albacete
19:30 CEST		Report	Núñez 50' (pen.)	Stadium: Estadio Carlos Belmonte; Attendance: 0 Referee: Miguel Ángel Ortiz Arias

17 June 2020 33	Extremadura	0–1	Albacete	Almendralejo
CEST (UTC+2)				Stadium: Francisco de la Hera

21 June 2020 34	Albacete	2–2	Huesca	Albacete
19:30 CEST (UTC+2)		Report		Stadium: Carlos Belmonte; Attendance: 0

24 June 2020 35	Albacete	0–0	Las Palmas	Albacete
19:30 CEST (UTC+2)				Stadium: Carlos Belmonte; Attendance: 0

27 June 2020 36	Racing Santander	1–2	Albacete	Oviedo
21:45 CEST (UTC+2)	Galán 47'	Report	Fuster 54'; Álvaro 81'	Stadium: Carlos Tartiere; Attendance: 0 Referee: Aitor Gorostegui Fernández-Ortega

2 July 2020 37	Albacete	1–1	Alcorcón	Albacete
19:30 CEST (UTC+2)	Eddy (yellow card) 33'; Chema (yellow card) 41'; Ojeda 57'; Arroyo (yellow card) 59'; Fuster (yellow card) 78'	Report	Sandaza 9'; Pomares (yellow card) 41' (yellow-red card) 83'; Reko (yellow card) 44'; Boateng (yellow card) 79'; Adot (yellow card) 90+6'	Stadium: Carlos Belmonte; Attendance: 0 Referee: Víctor Areces Franco

17 July 2020 41	Albacete	4–1	Real Zaragoza	Albacete
21:00 CEST (UTC+2)	Maikel 13' (pen.), (yellow card) 73'; Gorosito 22'; Ojeda 33', 46'; Acuña (yellow card) 80'	Report	Burgui 29' (pen.); Clemente (yellow card) 62'; Buyla (yellow card) 82'	Stadium: Estadio Carlos Belmonte; Attendance: 0 Referee: Aitor Gorostegui Fernández-Ortega

20 July 2020 42	Cádiz	0–1	Albacete	Cádiz
21:00 CEST (UTC+2)		Report	Maikel 87' (pen.)	Stadium: Estadio Ramón de Carranza; Attendance: 0 Referee: Iñaki Vicandi Garrido

=== Copa del Rey ===
18 December 2019 First round	Tudelano	0–1	Albacete	Tudela
18:00 CEST (UTC+2)		Report	Ojeda 40'	Stadium: Ciudad de Tudela; Attendance: 0 Referee: Daniel Ocón Arráiz

11 January 2020 Second round	Ibiza	1–1 (a.e.t.) (5–3 p)	Albacete	Ibiza
17:00 CEST (UTC+2)	Núñez 66'	Report	Álvaro 43'	Stadium: Can Misses; Attendance: 4,345; Referee: Iñaki Bikandi Garrido
	Penalties
	Pérez (penalty scored); Lara (penalty scored); Gonzalo (penalty scored); Rodado (penalty scored); Mendoza (penalty scored)		(penalty scored) Ojeda; (penalty scored) Fuster; (penalty scored) Azamoum; (penalty missed) Olabe
