= 2018–19 Albacete Balompié season =

Albacete
2018–19 season
- Owner: Skyline International
- President: Georges Kabchi
- Head coach: Luis Miguel Ramis
- Stadium: Carlos Belmonte
- Segunda División: 4th
- Copa del Rey: Second round
- Top goalscorer: League: Jérémie Bela (12); All: Jérémie Bela (12)
Home colours	Away colours

The 2018–19 season is Albacete Balompié's 78th season in existence and the club's second consecutive season in the second division of Spanish football. In addition to the domestic league, Albacete participated in this season's edition of the Copa del Rey. The season covered the period from 1 July 2018 to 30 June 2019.

== Players ==
=== Current squad ===
As of 24 March 2019

Note: Flags indicate national team as defined under FIFA eligibility rules; some limited exceptions apply. Players may hold more than one non-FIFA nationality.

No.	Pos.	Nation	Player
1	GK	ESP	Churripi (on loan from Real Valladolid)
2	DF	ESP	Álvaro Arroyo (Captain)
3	DF	ESP	Fran García
4	DF	ARG	Nico Gorosito
6	MF	GHA	Sulley Muntari
7	MF	ESP	Néstor Susaeta
8	MF	ESP	Aleix Febas (on loan from Real Madrid)
9	MF	CAN	Ballou Tabla (on loan from Barcelona B)
10	FW	UKR	Roman Zozulya
11	MF	MTQ	Mickaël Malsa (on loan from Fortuna Sittard)
12	MF	COL	Daniel Torres (on loan from Alavés)
13	GK	ESP	Tomeu Nadal

No.	Pos.	Nation	Player
14	MF	ESP	Diego Barri
15	FW	PAR	Javier Acuña
16	DF	ESP	José Antonio Caro
17	MF	ESP	Eugeni (on loan from Huesca)
18	MF	ESP	Álvaro Peña
19	DF	ARG	Santiago Gentiletti
20	MF	URU	Juan Boselli (on loan from Peñarol)
21	DF	ESP	Borja Herrera
22	FW	ALB	Rey Manaj (on loan from Inter Milan)
23	DF	ESP	Álvaro Tejero (on loan from Real Madrid)
24	FW	FRA	Jérémie Bela

=== Reserve team ===
Note: Flags indicate national team as defined under FIFA eligibility rules; some limited exceptions apply. Players may hold more than one non-FIFA nationality.

No.	Pos.	Nation	Player
26	GK	ESP	Darío Ramos
28	MF	GEO	Lado Mokhevishvili
30	DF	ESP	Ángel Moreno

No.	Pos.	Nation	Player
34	DF	ESP	Rubén del Valle
37	MF	ESP	Dani García
38	FW	ESP	Miguel Ángel

=== Out on loan ===
Note: Flags indicate national team as defined under FIFA eligibility rules; some limited exceptions apply. Players may hold more than one non-FIFA nationality.

No.	Pos.	Nation	Player
—	MF	CMR	Jean Jules Mvondo (on loan at UCAM Murcia until 30 June 2019)
—	MF	ESP	Sergio Molina (on loan at Salmantino until 30 June 2019)

No.	Pos.	Nation	Player
—	FW	ESP	Alfon (on loan at Inter de Madrid until 30 June 2019)
—	FW	ESP	Alfredo Ortuño (on loan at Extremadura until 30 June 2019)

== Pre-season and friendlies ==
Win Draw Loss

28 July 2018 Friendly	Albacete (Spain)	2–1	(Spain) Hércules	Albacete, Spain
19:00 CEST (UTC+2)				Stadium: Ciudad Deportiva Andrés Iniesta

1 August 2018 Friendly	Albacete (Spain)	2–1	(Spain) Atlético Baleares	San Pedro del Pinatar, Spain
19:00 CEST (UTC+2)				Stadium: Pinatar Arena Football Center

4 August 2018 Friendly	Albacete (Spain)	1–2	(Spain) Elche	San Pedro del Pinatar, Spain
19:30 CEST (UTC+2)				Stadium: Pinatar Arena Football Center

8 August 2018 Friendly	Albacete (Spain)	2–2 (5–6 p)	(Spain) Levante	Albacete, Spain
20:30 CEST (UTC+2)				Stadium: Carlos Belmonte

== Competitions ==
Win Draw Loss

=== Overview ===
Competition	First match	Last match	Starting round	Final position	Record							
Competition	First match	Last match	Starting round	Final position	Pld	W	D	L	GF	GA	GD	Win %
Segunda División	17 August 2018	8 June 2019	Matchday 1	4th	42	19	14	9	54	38	+16	45.24
Copa del Rey	13 September 2018		Second round	Second round	1	0	0	1	2	3	−1	0.00
Total					43	19	14	10	56	41	+15	44.19

Last updated: 16 June 2019
Source: Competitions

=== Segunda División ===
==== League table ====
Pos	Team	Pld	W	D	L	GF	GA	GD	Pts	Promotion, qualification or relegation
2	Granada (P)	42	22	13	7	52	28	+24	79	Promotion to La Liga
3	Málaga	42	21	11	10	51	31	+20	74	Qualification to promotion play-offs
4	Albacete	42	19	14	9	54	38	+16	71	Qualification to promotion play-offs
5	Mallorca (O, P)	42	19	12	11	53	37	+16	69	Qualification to promotion play-offs
6	Deportivo La Coruña	42	17	17	8	50	32	+18	68	Qualification to promotion play-offs

Source: La Liga
Rules for classification: 1) points; 2) head-to-head points; 3) head-to-head goal difference; 4) goal difference; 5) number of goals scored
(O) Play-off winners; (P) Promoted

==== Results summary ====
Overall								Home						Away					
Pld	W	D	L	GF	GA	GD	Pts	W	D	L	GF	GA	GD	W	D	L	GF	GA	GD
42	19	14	9	54	38	+16	71	9	10	2	29	17	+12	10	4	7	25	21	+4

Last updated: 8 June 2019.

==== Results by round ====
Round	1	2	3	4	5	6	7	8	9	10	11	12	13	14	15	16	17	18	19	20	21	22	23	24	25	26	27	28	29	30	31	32	33	34	35	36	37	38	39	40	41	42
Ground	H	A	H	A	H	A	H	A	A	H	A	H	A	H	A	H	H	A	H	A	H	A	H	A	H	A	H	A	A	H	A	H	A	H	H	A	H	A	H	A	H	A
Result	D	D	W	W	D	W	D	L	L	D	W	W	D	W	W	W	D	W	W	D	D	L	W	W	W	D	D	L	L	W	W	D	W	D	W	L	D	W	L	W	L	L
Position	8	10	4	5	5	3	6	7	7	8	6	5	5	5	5	4	5	4	2	2	2	4	5	5	1	1	2	3	3	3	3	3	3	2	2	3	3	3	3	3	4	4

Updated to match(es) played on 8 June 2019. Source:
A = Away; H = Home; W = Win; D = Draw; L = Loss

==== Matches ====
The fixtures were revealed on 24 July 2018.

17 August 2018 1	Albacete	1–1	Deportivo La Coruña	Albacete
CEST (UTC+2)				Stadium: Carlos Belmonte

25 August 2018 2	Las Palmas	1–1	Albacete	Las Palmas
CEST (UTC+2)				Stadium: Gran Canaria

2 September 2018 3	Albacete	3–0	Córdoba	Albacete
CEST (UTC+2)				Stadium: Carlos Belmonte

9 September 2018 4	Reus	1–2	Albacete	Municipal
CEST (UTC+2)				Attendance: Reus

17 September 2018 5	Albacete	1–1	Cádiz	Albacete
CEST (UTC+2)				Stadium: Carlos Belmonte

23 September 2018 6	Mallorca	1–3	Albacete	Palma
CEST (UTC+2)				Stadium: Son Moix

28 September 2018 7	Albacete	2–2	Real Zaragoza	Albacete
CEST (UTC+2)				Stadium: Carlos Belmonte

7 October 2018 8	Real Oviedo	1–0	Albacete	Oviedo
CEST (UTC+2)				Stadium: Carlos Tartiere

12 October 2018 9	Málaga	2–1	Albacete	Málaga
CEST (UTC+2)				Stadium: La Rosaleda

21 October 2018 10	Albacete	1–1	Almería	Albacete
CEST (UTC+2)				Stadium: Carlos Belmonte

28 October 2018 11	Extremadura	1–2	Albacete	Almendralejo
CET (UTC+1)				Stadium: Francisco de la Hera

2 November 2018 12	Albacete	2–0	Gimnàstic	Albacete
CEST (UTC+2)				Stadium: Carlos Belmonte

11 November 2018 13	Tenerife	0–0	Albacete	Santa Cruz de Tenerife
CEST (UTC+2)				Stadium: Heliodoro Rodríguez López

18 November 2018 14	Albacete	1–0	Lugo	Albacete
CET (UTC+1)				Stadium: Carlos Belmonte

25 November 2018 15	Elche	0–1	Albacete	Elche
CET (UTC+1)				Stadium: Martínez Valero

2 December 2018 16	Albacete	2–1	Alcorcón	Albacete
CET (UTC+1)				Stadium: Carlos Belmonte

8 December 2018 17	Albacete	2–2	Osasuna	Albacete
CET (UTC+1)				Stadium: Carlos Belmonte

15 December 2018 18	Numancia	1–2	Albacete	Soria
CET (UTC+1)				Stadium: Los Pajaritos

23 December 2018 19	Albacete	1–0	Rayo Majadahonda	Albacete
CET (UTC+1)				Stadium: Carlos Belmonte

4 January 2019 20	Granada	1–1	Albacete	Granada
CET (UTC+1)				Stadium: Nuevo Los Cármenes

12 January 2019 21	Albacete	1–1	Sporting Gijón	Albacete
CET (UTC+1)				Stadium: Carlos Belmonte

20 January 2019 22	Deportivo La Coruña	2–0	Albacete	A Coruña
CET (UTC+1)				Stadium: Abanca-Riazor

27 January 2019 23	Albacete	1–0	Reus	Albacete
CET (UTC+1)				Stadium: Carlos Belmonte

2 February 2019 24	Córdoba	1–3	Albacete	Córdoba
CET (UTC+1)				Stadium: El Arcángel

10 February 2019 25	Albacete	2–0	Mallorca	Albacete
CET (UTC+1)				Stadium: Carlos Belmonte

16 February 2019 26	Real Zaragoza	0–0	Albacete	Zaragoza
CET (UTC+1)				Stadium: La Romareda

23 February 2019 27	Albacete	0–0	Real Oviedo	Albacete
CET (UTC+1)				Stadium: Carlos Belmonte

2 March 2019 28	Cádiz	1–0	Albacete	Cádiz
CET (UTC+1)				Stadium: Ramón de Carranza

9 March 2019 29	Gimnàstic	1–0	Albacete	Tarragona
CET (UTC+1)				Stadium: Nou Estadi

16 March 2019 30	Albacete	1–0	Extremadura	Albacete
CET (UTC+1)				Stadium: Carlos Belmonte

23 March 2019 31	Lugo	0–3	Albacete	Lugo
CET (UTC+1)				Stadium: Anxo Carro

30 March 2019 32	Albacete	2–2	Tenerife	Albacete
CEST (UTC+2)				Stadium: Carlos Belmonte

7 April 2019 33	Alcorcón	0–1	Albacete	Alcorcón
CEST (UTC+2)				Stadium: Santo Domingo

14 April 2019 34	Albacete	1–1	Elche	Albacete
CEST (UTC+2)				Stadium: Carlos Belmonte

20 April 2019 35	Albacete	4–2	Las Palmas	Albacete
CEST (UTC+2)				Stadium: Carlos Belmonte

27 April 2019 36	Osasuna	2–0	Albacete	Pamplona
CEST (UTC+2)				Stadium: El Sadar

5 May 2019 37	Albacete	0–0	Numancia	Albacete
CEST (UTC+2)				Stadium: Carlos Belmonte

12 May 2019 38	Rayo Majadahonda	2–3	Albacete	Majadahonda
CEST (UTC+2)				Stadium: Cerro del Espino

20 May 2019 39	Albacete	0–1	Granada	Albacete
CEST (UTC+2)				Stadium: Carlos Belmonte

25 May 2019 40	Sporting Gijón	0–2	Albacete	Gijón
CEST (UTC+2)				Stadium: El Molinón

4 June 2019 41	Albacete	1–2	Málaga	Albacete
CEST (UTC+2)				Stadium: Carlos Belmonte

8 June 2019 42	Almería	3–0	Albacete	Almería
CEST (UTC+2)				Stadium: Juegos Mediterráneos

=== Copa del Rey ===
13 September 2018 Second round	Albacete	2–3	Lugo	Albacete
20:00 CEST (UTC+2)	Ortuño 11'; Manaj 90+3'		Lazo 2'; Chus Herrero 35' (o.g.); Juan Muñiz 61'	Stadium: Carlos Belmonte; Attendance: 4,839; Referee: Santiago Varón Aceitón
