= Diego Vargas (footballer) =

Spanish footballer

Personal information
- Full name: Diego Cortés Vargas
- Date of birth: 8 July 1998 (age 28)
- Place of birth: Huelva, Spain
- Height: 1.82 m (6 ft 0 in)
- Position: Forward

Team information
- Current team: Dos Hermanas

Youth career
- 2002–2008: Salesianos
- 2008–2012: Nuevo Molino
- 2012–2017: Recreativo

Senior career*
Years	Team	Apps	(Gls)
2016–2019	Recreativo B	60	(17)
2016–2019	Recreativo	4	(0)
2019	Sevilla C	13	(3)
2019–2020	Salamanca B	21	(12)
2020–2021	Albacete B	17	(7)
2020–2021	Albacete	6	(0)
2021–2022	Formentera	9	(0)
2022	Europa	10	(0)
2022–2024	Cartaya	16	(4)
2024–2025	La Palma	31	(14)
2025–	Dos Hermanas	10	(4)
- * Club domestic league appearances and goals as of 9 November 2025

Diego Cortés Vargas (born 8 July 1998) is a Spanish footballer who plays as a forward for Tercera Federación club Dos Hermanas.

== Club career ==
Born in Huelva, Andalusia, Vargas was a Recreativo de Huelva youth graduate. He made his senior debut with the reserves on 3 January 2016, playing the last 39 minutes in a 2–1 Primera Andaluza home win against CD San Roque de Lepe B.

Vargas made his first team debut on 7 May 2016, playing the last four minutes of a 1–1 away draw against CD San Roque de Lepe in the Segunda División B championship. He only scored his first senior goal on 17 September of the following year, netting the B's opener in a 2–1 Tercera División home win against CD Gerena.

On 17 January 2019, after alternating between the first team and the B-side, Vargas signed for Sevilla FC and was assigned to the C-team in the fourth division. On 5 August, he moved to Salamanca CF UDS, but only featured for the reserves.

On 23 January 2020, Vargas agreed to a contract with another reserve team, Atlético Albacete still in the fourth division. He made his debut with the main squad on 16 December, coming on as a second-half substitute for Nahuel Arroyo in a 0–1 away loss against Córdoba CF, for the season's Copa del Rey.

Vargas' professional debut occurred on 21 December 2020, as he replaced Álvaro Peña in a 2–0 Segunda División away success over CD Mirandés.
