= Nahuel Arroyo =

Spanish footballer

Personal information
- Full name: Nahuel Arroyo Mazorra
- Date of birth: 26 March 1995 (age 31)
- Place of birth: Santa Cristina d'Aro, Spain
- Height: 1.80 m (5 ft 11 in)
- Position: Winger

Team information
- Current team: Terrassa
- Number: 20

Youth career
- Gironès-Sàbat
- Sant Feliu
- 2013–2014: Girona

Senior career*
Years	Team	Apps	(Gls)
2014–2017	Girona B	56	(6)
2017–2018	Palamós	35	(2)
2018–2019	Horta	35	(5)
2019–2020	Llagostera	28	(6)
2020–2021	Albacete	9	(0)
2021	Córdoba	12	(1)
2021–2022	Cultural Leonesa	27	(2)
2022–2023	Cornellà	34	(1)
2023–2024	San Fernando	30	(0)
2024–2026	Talavera	46	(7)
2026–	Terrassa	17	(3)
- * Club domestic league appearances and goals as of 15 May 2026

Nahuel Arroyo Mazorra (born 26 March 1995) is a Spanish footballer who plays mainly as a left winger for Segunda Federación club Terrassa.

== Club career ==
Born in Santa Cristina d'Aro, Girona, Catalonia, Arroyo represented EF Gironès-Sàbat, EF Sant Feliu de Guíxols and Girona FC as a youth. He made his senior debut with the reserves during the 2014–15 season, in the regional leagues.

On 22 June 2017, Arroyo signed for Palamós CF in Tercera División. The following May, after being a regular starter, he moved to fellow league team UA Horta, and helped the latter club reach the play-offs.

On 25 June 2019, Arroyo agreed to a deal with Segunda División B newcomers UE Llagostera. On 5 October, he scored a brace in a 3–0 away win against Orihuela CF.

On 5 August 2020, Arroyo signed a three-year deal with Albacete Balompié in Segunda División. He made his professional debut on 22 October, coming on as a late substitute for Álvaro Peña in a 0–0 away draw against RCD Mallorca.

On 1 February 2021, Arroyo agreed to a two-and-a-half-year contract with Córdoba CF in the third division, after terminating his link with Alba.
