= Eddy Israfilov =

Footballer (born 1992)

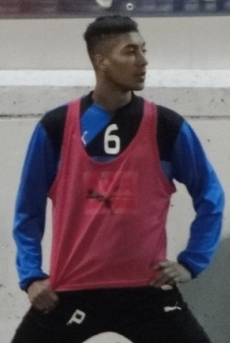
- Eddy with Eibar in 2016

Personal information
- Full name: Eddy Silvestre Pascual Israfilov
- Date of birth: 2 August 1992 (age 34)
- Place of birth: Roquetas de Mar, Spain
- Height: 1.91 m (6 ft 3 in)
- Position: Defensive midfielder

Team information
- Current team: Johor Darul Ta'zim
- Number: 23

Youth career
- 2005–2007: Milan schools in Spain
- 2007–2008: La Mojonera
- 2008–2010: Poli Ejido
- 2010–2011: Murcia

Senior career*
| Years | Team | Apps | (Gls) |
| 2011–2012 | Murcia B | 26 | (1) |
| 2011–2016 | Murcia | 52 | (2) |
| 2014–2016 | → Granada (loan) | 5 | (0) |
| 2015 | → Eibar (loan) | 6 | (0) |
| 2016 | → Córdoba (loan) | 14 | (0) |
| 2016–2017 | Cádiz | 20 | (1) |
| 2017–2018 | Gimnàstic | 11 | (0) |
| 2018–2019 | Alcorcón | 30 | (1) |
| 2019–2021 | Albacete | 63 | (3) |
| 2022–2024 | Neftçi | 55 | (5) |
| 2024– | Johor Darul Ta'zim | 24 | (2) |

International career^{‡}
| 2015– | Azerbaijan | 26 | (0) |
- * Club domestic league appearances and goals as of 27 June 2025 ‡ National team caps and goals as of 4 April 2024

Eddy Silvestre Pascual Israfilov (Note: Commonly known as Eddi İsrafilov in Azerbaijan, and Eddy Silvestre in Spain) (Azerbaijani: Eddi Silvestr Paskual İsrafilov; born 2 August 1992), or simply Eddy, is a professional footballer who plays as a defensive midfielder for Malaysia Super League club Johor Darul Ta'zim. Born in Spain, he represents the Azerbaijan national team.

He spent most of his professional career in Spain, playing 11 La Liga games for Granada and Eibar, as well as 189 games and 7 goals in Segunda División for six clubs, mainly Real Murcia and Albacete.

== Club career ==
=== Early life and career ===
Born in Roquetas de Mar, Almería, through an Angolan father and an Azerbaijani mother, Eddy entered football schools in Spain affiliated with Milan in 2005, when he was 13. After his release, his mother's partner advised him to play for La Mojonera CF in El Ejido as something to do. At the age of 16, he spent some months in a youth detention center. In the summer of 2010, he joined Real Murcia.

=== Real Murcia ===
Eddy made his first-team debut for Real Murcia on 8 May 2011, starting in a 2–1 home success against Jumilla CF in the Segunda División B championship; it was his maiden appearance in the competition as the Murcians were promoted at the end of the season. However, he spent several years with the B-side in Tercera División.

On 25 August 2012 Eddy played his first match as a professional, coming on as a substitute in a 3–2 win at Sporting de Gijón. On 26 January 2014 he scored his first goal, netting his side's second in a 2–2 home draw against RCD Mallorca.

==== Loans ====
On 1 September 2014 Eddy moved to La Liga side Granada CF, in a season-long loan deal with a buyout clause. He made his debut in the competition on the 20th, replacing Rubén Rochina in the 62nd minute of a 1–0 away success over Athletic Bilbao.

On 12 July 2015, Eddy was loaned to fellow league team SD Eibar, for one year. On 1 February of the following year, after being rarely used, he moved to second-tier Córdoba CF on loan until the end of season and featured more regularly as the side made the play-offs.

=== Cádiz and Gimnàstic ===
On 18 August 2016, Eddy signed a permanent two-year contract with Cádiz CF, newly promoted to the second division. On 29 August of the following year, he moved to fellow league team Gimnàstic de Tarragona on a free transfer, after agreeing to a three-year deal.

=== Alcorcón ===
On 29 January 2018, after cutting ties with Nàstic, Eddy signed a two-and-a-half-year contract with AD Alcorcón. Initially a backup option, he became a regular starter in 2018–19.

=== Albacete ===
On 12 August 2019, Eddy agreed to a four-year deal with fellow second division side Albacete. He and 17 others left in May 2021, following the team's relegation to the Primera División RFEF.

=== Neftçi ===
On 5 January 2022, Eddy signed for Azerbaijan Premier League champions Neftçi on a 2.5-year contract. With the team, he competed in the UEFA Europa Conference League, scoring in a home qualifying wins over Aris Limassol on 28 July 2022 and against Željezničar Sarajevo on 3 August the following year. On 21 June 2024, Neftçi announced the departure of Eddy.

=== Johor Darul Ta'zim ===
On 10 August 2024, Israfilov signed for Malaysia Super League side Johor Darul Ta'zim.

== International career ==
Eddy's father, Domingo Pascual, was born in Luanda, Angola while his mother, Irada Israfilova, comes from Baku, Azerbaijan. As a result, he was eligible for these two countries, in addition to his native country of Spain.

In May 2013, Eddy was called up by Azerbaijan for a friendly match against Qatar. However, he refused to link up with the national squad, alleging club obligations.

On 8 January 2015, Azerbaijan's manager Robert Prosinečki declared that Eddy opted to represent the country. He made his debut on 28 March against Malta in a UEFA Euro 2016 qualifying match, replacing Vuqar Nadirov for the final nine minutes of a 2–0 win at the Tofiq Bahramov Stadium.

== Personal life ==
Eddy was indicted in court over an explicit video recorded by his Eibar teammates Sergi Enrich and Antonio Luna in 2016 without the consent of the woman in the video. He was accused by the other two of diffusing the video, which he denied, and was acquitted in 2021.

== Honours ==
=== Johor Darul Ta'zim ===
- Malaysia Super League: 2024–25
- Malaysia FA Cup: 2024
- Malaysia Cup: 2024–25
- Malaysia Charity Shield: 2025

== Career statistics ==
=== Club ===
As of match played 11 January 2025

Appearances and goals by club, season and competition
| Club | Season | League | | | Cup (Note: Includes Copa del Rey) | | Other | | Total | |
| Club | Season | Division | Apps | Goals | Apps | Goals | Apps | Goals | Apps | Goals |
|---|---|---|---|---|---|---|---|---|---|---|
| Real Murcia | 2010–11 | Segunda División B | 1 | 0 | — | | — | | 1 | 0 |
| Real Murcia | 2012–13 | Segunda División | 16 | 0 | 1 | 0 | — | | 17 | 0 |
| Real Murcia | 2013–14 | Segunda División | 35 | 2 | 1 | 0 | 2 (Note: Appearances in Segunda División play-offs) | 0 | 38 | 2 |
| Real Murcia | Total | | 52 | 2 | 2 | 0 | 2 | 0 | 56 | 2 |
| Real Murcia B | 2011–12 | Tercera División | 23 | 0 | — | | — | | 23 | 0 |
| Granada (loan) | 2014–15 | La Liga | 5 | 0 | 3 | 0 | — | | 8 | 0 |
| Eibar (loan) | 2015–16 | La Liga | 6 | 0 | 3 | 0 | — | | 9 | 0 |
| Córdoba (loan) | 2015–16 | Segunda División | 14 | 0 | 0 | 0 | 0 | 0 | 14 | 0 |
| Cádiz | 2016–17 | Segunda División | 20 | 1 | 1 | 0 | 0 | 0 | 21 | 1 |
| Gimnàstic | 2017–18 | Segunda División | 11 | 0 | 0 | 0 | — | | 11 | 0 |
| Alcorcón | 2017–18 | Segunda División | 1 | 0 | 0 | 0 | — | | 1 | 0 |
| Alcorcón | 2018–19 | Segunda División | 29 | 1 | 2 | 0 | — | | 31 | 1 |
| Alcorcón | Total | | 30 | 1 | 2 | 0 | — | | 32 | 1 |
| Albacete | 2019–20 | Segunda División | 29 | 1 | 2 | 0 | — | | 31 | 1 |
| Albacete | 2020–21 | Segunda División | 31 | 2 | 1 | 0 | — | | 32 | 2 |
| Albacete | Total | | 60 | 3 | 3 | 0 | — | | 63 | 3 |
| Neftçi PFK | 2021–22 | Azerbaijan Premier League | 12 | 2 | 3 | 0 | 0 | 0 | 15 | 2 |
| Neftçi PFK | 2022–23 | Azerbaijan Premier League | 21 | 3 | 4 | 0 | 4 | 1 | 29 | 4 |
| Neftçi PFK | 2023–24 | Azerbaijan Premier League | 22 | 0 | 4 | 0 | 2 | 1 | 28 | 1 |
| Neftçi PFK | 2024–25 | Azerbaijan Premier League | 0 | 0 | 0 | 0 | 0 | 0 | 0 | 0 |
| Neftçi PFK | Total | | 55 | 5 | 11 | 0 | 6 | 2 | 72 | 7 |
| Johor Darul Ta'zim | 2024–25 | Malaysia Super League | 5 | 0 | 0 | 0 | 6 (Note: Appearances in AFC Champions League Elite) | 0 | 11 | 0 |
| Career total | | | 225 | 7 | 14 | 0 | 12 | 0 | 251 | 7 |

=== International ===
Statistics accurate as of match played 24 March 2023.

Azerbaijan
| Year | Apps | Goals |
|---|---|---|
| 2015 | 4 | 0 |
| 2016 | 3 | 0 |
| 2017 | 1 | 0 |
| 2018 | 0 | 0 |
| 2019 | 5 | 0 |
| 2020 | 0 | 0 |
| 2021 | 0 | 0 |
| 2022 | 8 | 0 |
| 2023 | 1 | 0 |
| Total | 22 | 0 |
