= Tana (footballer) =

Spanish footballer (born 1990)

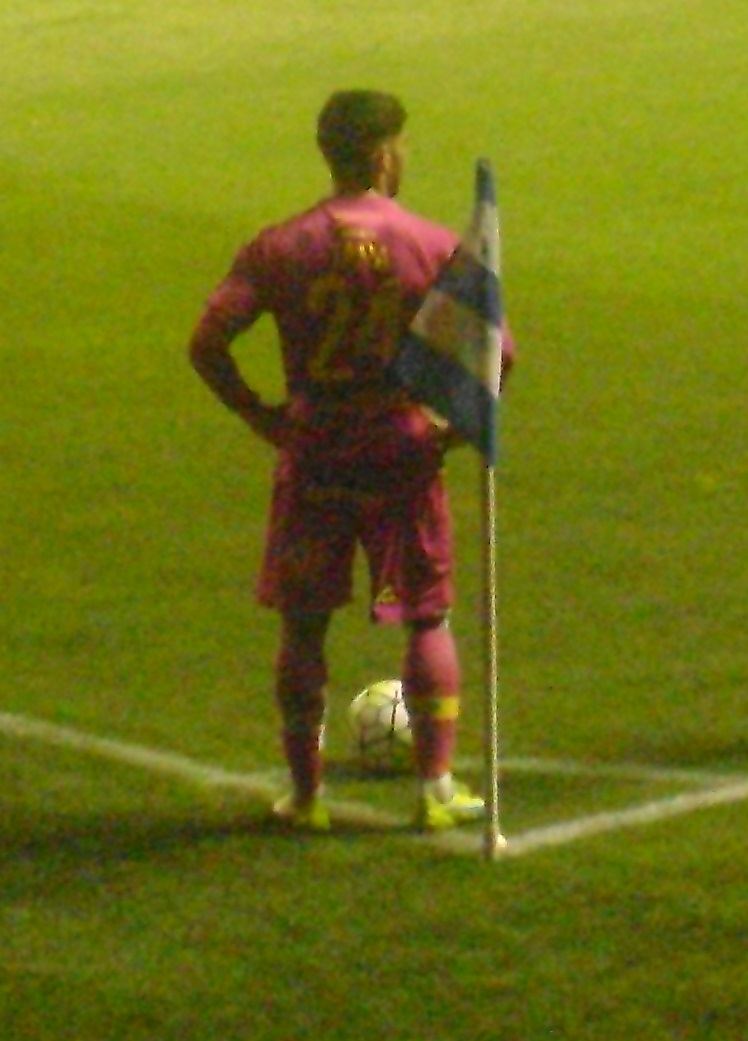
- Tana with Las Palmas in 2017

Personal information
- Full name: Pedro Tanausú Domínguez Placeres
- Date of birth: 20 September 1990 (age 36)
- Place of birth: Las Palmas, Spain
- Height: 1.69 m (5 ft 7 in)
- Positions: Attacking midfielder; winger

Team information
- Current team: Ratchaburi
- Number: 6

Youth career
- 1998–1999: Real Artesano
- 1999–2000: Alcaraván
- 2000–2001: Veteranos del Pilar
- 2001–2003: Las Palmas
- 2003: Guayre
- 2003–2004: Unión Viera
- 2004–2005: Acodetti
- 2005–2006: Huracán
- 2006–2007: Valladolid
- 2007–2008: Estrella Roja
- 2008–2009: Unión Viera

Senior career*
Years	Team	Apps	(Gls)
2009–2010	Villa Santa Brígida	5	(1)
2010–2011	Vecindario B	7	(2)
2011–2012	Vecindario	3	(0)
2012–2013	Las Palmas C	17	(4)
2013	Las Palmas B	9	(0)
2013–2020	Las Palmas	129	(12)
2019	→ Zhejiang Greentown (loan)	7	(0)
2021	Albacete	9	(1)
2022	Maziya	0	(0)
2022–2023	Churchill Brothers	11	(2)
2023–2024	Tamaraceite	13	(3)
2024	Mensajero	14	(0)
2024–	Ratchaburi	56	(13)
- * Club domestic league appearances and goals as of 22:55, 5 August 2026 (UTC)

Pedro Tanausú Domínguez Placeres (born 20 September 1990), commonly known as Tana, is a Spanish professional footballer who plays as an attacking midfielder or a winger for Thai League 1 club Ratchaburi.

== Club career ==
Born in Las Palmas, Canary Islands, Tana made his senior debut with lowly UD Villa de Santa Brígida in the 2009–10 season. He first arrived in the Segunda División B two years later, with UD Vecindario.

In January 2012, Tana signed for UD Las Palmas, being initially assigned to the third team. He was promoted to the reserves the following year, with whom he promoted to the third division at the end of 2012–13 campaign.

In August 2013, Tana was promoted to the main squad in the Segunda División, and made his debut as a professional later that month by coming on as a 59th-minute substitute for Jesús Tato in a 1–1 home draw against SD Eibar. He scored his first goal in the competition on 5 October, in the 2–0 home win over Córdoba CF.

Tana contributed only one league appearance during 2014–15, as the Amarillos achieved promotion to La Liga. His maiden appearance in the Spanish top flight occurred on 25 October 2015, as he started in a 0–0 home draw against Villarreal CF.

A starter under new manager Quique Setién, Tana signed a new three-year deal with Las Palmas on 25 November 2015. He scored his first goal in the top tier on 30 December, opening a 4–1 home rout of Granada CF.

Tana renewed with Las Palmas on 7 April 2016, until 2019. On 20 September 2018, he further extended his link until 2023.

On 31 January 2019, Tana was loaned to a Chinese club until the end of the year, later revealed to be Zhejiang Greentown FC. On 3 September 2020, his contract was terminated by the board of directors due to "disciplinary reasons", with Las Palmas having previously hired a private investigator to follow him around.

On 1 January 2021, free agent Tana agreed to a short-term deal at Albacete Balompié in the second division. He went abroad again in 2022, joining Dhivehi Premier League side Maziya S&RC and appearing with them in the group stage of the AFC Cup, where he created 17 chances and scored two goals.

Tana then competed in India with Churchill Brothers FC Goa (I-League), also having an unsuccessful trial in that country at NorthEast United FC (Super League). He returned to Spain in September 2023, representing UD Tamaraceite and CD Mensajero at amateur level.

In August 2024, Tana signed for Thai League 1 club Ratchaburi FC.

== Career statistics ==
As of 12 January 2023

Club	Season	League			Cup		Other		Continental		Total	
Club	Season	Division	Apps	Goals	Apps	Goals	Apps	Goals	Apps	Goals	Apps	Goals
Vecindario	2010–11	Segunda División B	1	0	0	0	—		—		1	0
Vecindario	2011–12	Segunda División B	2	0	0	0	—		—		2	0
Vecindario	Vecindario B total		3	0	0	0	0	0	0	0	3	0
Las Palmas	2011–12	Segunda División	0	0	0	0	—		—		0	0
Las Palmas	2013–14	Segunda División	24	2	1 (Note: Appearances in Copa del Rey)	1	—		—		25	3
Las Palmas	2014–15	Segunda División	1	0	2	0	—		—		3	0
Las Palmas	2015–16	La Liga	27	5	1	0	—		—		28	5
Las Palmas	2016–17	La Liga	32	4	2	0	—		—		34	4
Las Palmas	2017–18	La Liga	24	1	3	0	—		—		27	1
Las Palmas	2018–19	Segunda División	14	0	1	0	—		—		15	0
Las Palmas	2019–20	Segunda División	7	0	0	0	—		—		7	0
Las Palmas	Las Palmas total		129	12	10	1	0	0	0	0	139	13
Zhejiang Greentown (loan)	2019	China League One	7	0	2 (Note: Appearances in Chinese FA Cup)	1	—		—		9	1
Albacete	2020–21	Segunda División	9	1	0	0	—		—		9	1
Maziya	2022	Dhivehi Premier League	0	0	0	0	—		3 (Note: Appearances in AFC Cup)	2	3	2
Churchill Brothers	2022–23	I-League	11	2	0	0	3 (Note: Appearances in Baji Rout Cup)	1	—		14	3
Career total			159	15	12	2	3	1	3	2	177	20

== Honours ==
Churchill Brothers

- Baji Rout Cup runner-up: 2022

Individual

- Thai League 1 Team of the Season: 2025–26
