= Fran García (footballer, born 1992) =

Spanish footballer

Personal information
- Full name: Francisco García Solsona
- Date of birth: 7 December 1992 (age 33)
- Place of birth: Villarreal, Spain
- Height: 1.74 m (5 ft 9 in)
- Position: Left-back

Youth career
- Villarreal

Senior career*
Years	Team	Apps	(Gls)
2009–2012	Villarreal C	81	(1)
2010–2014	Villarreal B	52	(0)
2014–2016	Albacete	15	(0)
2015	→ Villarreal B (loan)	13	(0)
2016	ASA Târgu Mureș	0	(0)
2016–2018	Fuenlabrada	71	(0)
2018–2021	Albacete	77	(1)
2021–2023	Burgos	45	(0)
2023–2025	Anorthosis	21	(0)
2026	Juventud Torremolinos	10	(0)
- * Club domestic league appearances and goals as of 10 June 2026

Francisco 'Fran' García Solsona (born 7 December 1992) is a Spanish professional footballer who plays as a left-back.

== Club career ==
Born in Villarreal, Valencian Community, García was a youth product at local club Villarreal CF, making his senior debut in 2009 and going on to spend several seasons in the Tercera División with the C team. On 19 June 2010, he made his first appearance with the reserves, playing ten minutes in a 1–2 Segunda División home loss against UD Salamanca.

On 16 July 2014, after featuring regularly for the B side in the Segunda División B, García signed a two-year contract with Albacete Balompié, recently returned to the second tier. On 22 January of the following year, he returned to Villarreal B on loan until June.

García moved abroad in summer 2016 by joining Romania's ASA 2013 Târgu Mureș but, shortly after, went back to Spain with third-division CF Fuenlabrada due to the former's economic problems, going on to take in part in two unsuccessful promotion play-offs. In July 2018, he returned to both the second tier and Albacete. He scored his first professional goal on 28 October 2020, opening an eventual 1–1 home draw with UD Las Palmas.

On 10 July 2021, the free agent García agreed to a contract with Burgos CF also in the second division. Two years later, he signed for Anorthosis Famagusta FC of the Cypriot First Division.

== Career statistics ==
As of match played 26 November 2023

Appearances and goals by club, season and competition
Club	Season	League			National Cup		Europe		Other		Total	
Club	Season	Division	Apps	Goals	Apps	Goals	Apps	Goals	Apps	Goals	Apps	Goals
Villarreal C	2009–10	Tercera División	11	0	—		—		—		11	0
Villarreal C	2010–11	Tercera División	31	1	—		—		—		31	1
Villarreal C	2011–12	Tercera División	39	0	—		—		—		39	0
Villarreal C	Subtotal		81	1	—		—		—		81	1
Villarreal B	2009–10	Segunda División	1	0	—		—		—		1	0
Villarreal B	2012–13	Segunda División B	17	0	—		—		—		17	0
Villarreal B	2013–14	Segunda División B	34	0	—		—		—		34	0
Villarreal B	Subtotal		52	0	—		—		—		52	0
Albacete	2014–15	Segunda División	6	0	1	0	—		—		7	0
Albacete	2015–16	Segunda División	9	0	1	0	—		—		10	0
Albacete	Subtotal		15	0	2	0	—		—		17	0
Villarreal B (loan)	2014–15	Segunda División B	13	0	—		—		—		13	0
Fuenlabrada	2016–17	Segunda División B	35	0	—		—		2 (Note: Appearances in Segunda División B play-offs)	0	37	0
Fuenlabrada	2017–18	Segunda División B	36	0	4	0	—		4	0	44	0
Fuenlabrada	Subtotal		71	0	4	0	—		6	0	81	0
Albacete	2018–19	Segunda División	22	0	0	0	—		2 (Note: Appearances in La Liga play-offs)	0	24	0
Albacete	2019–20	Segunda División	31	0	0	0	—		—		31	0
Albacete	2020–21	Segunda División	24	1	1	0	—		—		25	1
Albacete	Subtotal		77	1	1	0	—		2	0	80	1
Burgos	2021–22	Segunda División	17	0	1	0	—		—		18	0
Burgos	2022–23	Segunda División	28	0	2	0	—		—		30	0
Burgos	Subtotal		45	0	3	0	—		—		48	0
Anorthosis	2023–24	Cypriot First Division	11	0	0	0	—		—		11	0
Career total			365	2	10	0	0	0	8	0	383	2
