= Dani Ojeda =

Spanish footballer

Personal information
- Full name: Daniel Ojeda Saranova
- Date of birth: 3 December 1994 (age 31)
- Place of birth: Las Palmas, Spain
- Height: 1.80 m (5 ft 11 in)
- Position: Winger

Youth career
- 2001–2013: Las Palmas

Senior career*
Years	Team	Apps	(Gls)
2013–2015	Las Palmas C	?	(8)
2015–2016	Telde	38	(23)
2016–2017	Pobla Mafumet	19	(4)
2017–2018	Lorca	45	(10)
2018–2021	Leganés	10	(0)
2019	→ Granada (loan)	17	(1)
2019–2020	→ Albacete (loan)	35	(8)
2021	Alcorcón	22	(2)
2021–2023	Ponferradina	74	(12)
2023–2025	Burgos	75	(5)
2025–2026	Huesca	28	(2)
- * Club domestic league appearances and goals as of 9 June 2026

Daniel "Dani" Ojeda Saranova (born 3 December 1994) is a Spanish professional footballer who plays mainly as a left winger.

== Club career ==
Ojeda was born in Las Palmas, Canary Islands, and finished his graduation with UD Las Palmas. He made his senior debut for the C-team in the 2013–14 season in the regional leagues, before moving to Tercera División side UD Telde on 7 August 2015.

After scoring 23 goals during his first and only season at the club, Ojeda signed for Gimnàstic de Tarragona's farm team CF Pobla de Mafumet on 8 July 2016. The following 31 January he cut ties with the club, and joined Lorca FC in Segunda División B just hours later.

Ojeda contributed with 16 appearances (play-offs included) and four goals as his side achieved promotion to Segunda División for the first time ever. He made his professional debut on 18 August 2017, starting in a 2–0 home win against Cultural y Deportiva Leonesa.

Ojeda scored his first professional goal on 16 September 2017, netting the opener in a 1–1 home draw against CF Reus Deportiu. He was the club's top goalscorer during the campaign with six goals, but suffered team relegation.

On 28 June 2018, Ojeda signed a three-year contract with La Liga side CD Leganés. He made his debut in the category on 20 August, replacing Nabil El Zhar in a 1–2 loss at Athletic Bilbao.

On 13 January 2019, after appearing rarely, Ojeda was loaned to Granada CF in the second division, until the end of the season. On 16 July, he moved to fellow league team Albacete Balompié also in a temporary deal.

On 19 January 2021, Ojeda terminated his contract with Lega, and signed a short-term deal with AD Alcorcón still in the second division just hours later. On 7 July, he moved to fellow league team SD Ponferradina.

On 20 June 2023, after Ponfe's relegation, Ojeda agreed to a two-year contract with Burgos CF still in division two. On 7 July 2025, he joined fellow league team SD Huesca also for two seasons.
