= Diego Barri =

Spanish footballer

Barri
Personal information
- Full name: Diego Hernández Barriuso
- Date of birth: 19 September 1995 (age 31)
- Place of birth: Salamanca, Spain
- Height: 1.88 m (6 ft 2 in)
- Position: Midfielder

Team information
- Current team: Castellón
- Number: 8

Youth career
- Navega
- Salamanca
- 2013–2014: Unión Adarve

Senior career*
Years	Team	Apps	(Gls)
2014–2015	Alcalá B	32	(1)
2015–2016	Los Yébenes	32	(3)
2016–2017	Móstoles	35	(4)
2017–2018	Getafe B	32	(0)
2018	Getafe	1	(0)
2018–2020	Albacete	37	(0)
2020–2022	Badajoz	9	(0)
2021	→ Celta B (loan)	13	(0)
2022–2023	Osijek	12	(0)
2023–2025	Cultural Leonesa	68	(4)
2025–	Castellón	49	(5)
- * Club domestic league appearances and goals as of 17 October 2026

Diego Hernández Barriuso (born 19 September 1995), commonly known as Barri, is a Spanish professional footballer who plays for CD Castellón. Mainly a central midfielder, he can also play as a right back.

== Club career ==
Barri was born in Salamanca, Castile and León, and represented CD Navega, UD Salamanca and AD Unión Adarve as a youth. He made his senior debut with RSD Alcalá's reserve team in the 2014–15 season, in the regional leagues.

On 18 June 2016, after a one-year stint at CD Los Yébenes San Bruno, Barri signed for Tercera División side CD Móstoles URJC. On 20 June 2017, he moved to Getafe CF, being assigned to the reserves also in the fourth division.

Barri made his first team – and La Liga – debut on 21 April 2018, coming on as a second-half substitute for Sergio Mora in a 1–0 away win against SD Eibar. On 28 August, he signed a two-year deal with Albacete Balompié in Segunda División.

On 5 September 2020, Barri signed a two-year deal at CD Badajoz in Segunda División B. The following 18 January, he was loaned to Celta de Vigo B in the same league.

Barri moved abroad for the first time in his career on 30 January 2022, leaving cash-strapped Badajoz for NK Osijek of the Croatian Football League on an 18-month deal. He returned to his home country on 29 June 2023, signing for Primera Federación side Cultural y Deportiva Leonesa.

On 2 July 2025, after helping Cultu in their promotion to the second division, Barri agreed to a two-year contract with CD Castellón also in that category.

== Career statistics ==
=== Club ===
As of match played 2 October 2021

Appearances and goals by club, season and competition
Club	Season	League			National Cup		Other		Total	
Club	Season	Division	Apps	Goals	Apps	Goals	Apps	Goals	Apps	Goals
Alcalá B	2014–15	Preferente Madrid	32	1	—		—		32	1
Los Yébenes	2015–16	Preferente Madrid	32	3	—		—		32	3
Móstoles	2016–17	Tercera División	32	4	—		2 (Note: Appearance(s) in Segunda División Promotion)	0	34	4
Getafe B	2017–18	Tercera División	31	0	—		—		31	0
Getafe	2017–18	La Liga	2	0	0	0	—		2	0
Albacete	2018–19	Segunda División	13	0	1	0	1 (Note: Appearance(s) in La Liga Promotion)	0	15	0
Albacete	2019–20	Segunda División	24	0	2	0	—		26	0
Albacete	Total		37	0	3	0	1	0	41	0
Badajoz	2020–21	Segunda División B	3	0	0	0	—		3	0
Badajoz	2021–22	Primera División RFEF	6	0	0	0	—		6	0
Badajoz	Total		9	0	0	0	0	0	9	0
Celta B (loan)	2020–21	Segunda División B	13	0	—		—		13	0
Career total			188	8	3	0	3	0	194	8
