= Fran Castillo =

Spanish footballer

Personal information
- Full name: Francisco Castillo Viñolo
- Date of birth: 30 January 1997 (age 29)
- Place of birth: Alhaurín de la Torre, Spain
- Height: 1.73 m (5 ft 8 in)
- Position: Midfielder

Team information
- Current team: Castellón
- Number: 17

Youth career
- 2011–2012: Alhaurín de la Torre
- 2012–2013: La Mosca
- 2013–2014: Tiro Pichón
- 2014–2015: San Félix
- 2015–2016: Málaga

Senior career*
Years	Team	Apps	(Gls)
2016–2018	Málaga B	19	(1)
2018–2020	Albacete B	74	(12)
2019–2020	Albacete	0	(0)
2020–2021	Alhaurino	25	(4)
2021–2025	Juventud Torremolinos	125	(42)
2025–2026	Ibiza	29	(9)
2026–	Castellón	6	(1)
- * Club domestic league appearances and goals as of 17 October 2026

Francisco "Fran" Castillo Viñolo (born 30 January 1997) is a Spanish professional footballer who plays as a midfielder for CD Castellón.

== Career ==
Born in Alhaurín de la Torre, Málaga, Andalusia, Castillo represented Alhaurín de la Torre CF, UD La Mosca, CD Tiro Pichón and CD San Félix before joining Málaga CF's Juvenil squad in June 2015. In July 2016, he was promoted to the reserves in Tercera División, and made his senior debut during the season.

On 12 January 2018, after spending the first six months of the campaign without featuring for Atlético Malagueño, Castillo signed for Albacete Balompié and was initially assigned to the B-team also in the fourth division. He made his first team debut on 18 December 2019, coming on as a late substitute for Manu Fuster in a 1–0 Copa del Rey away win over CD Tudelano.

On 17 September 2020, after one further first team match for Alba, Castillo moved to CD Alhaurino in his hometown. In the following year, he signed for Juventud de Torremolinos CF in the newly-created Tercera División RFEF, and quickly became a key unit for the side, contributing with three promotions in his four-season spell and scoring a career-best 17 goals in the 2024–25 season.

On 24 June 2025, Castillo agreed to a deal with Primera Federación side UD Ibiza, after the club triggered his release clause. On 3 July of the following year, after being the top scorer of the Balearic side, he joined Segunda División club CD Castellón on a three-year contract.

Castillo made his professional debut at the age of 29 on 23 August 2026, coming on as a second-half substitute for Álvaro Martín in a 0–0 home draw against CE Sabadell FC.
