= Ivan Kecojević =

Montenegrin footballer

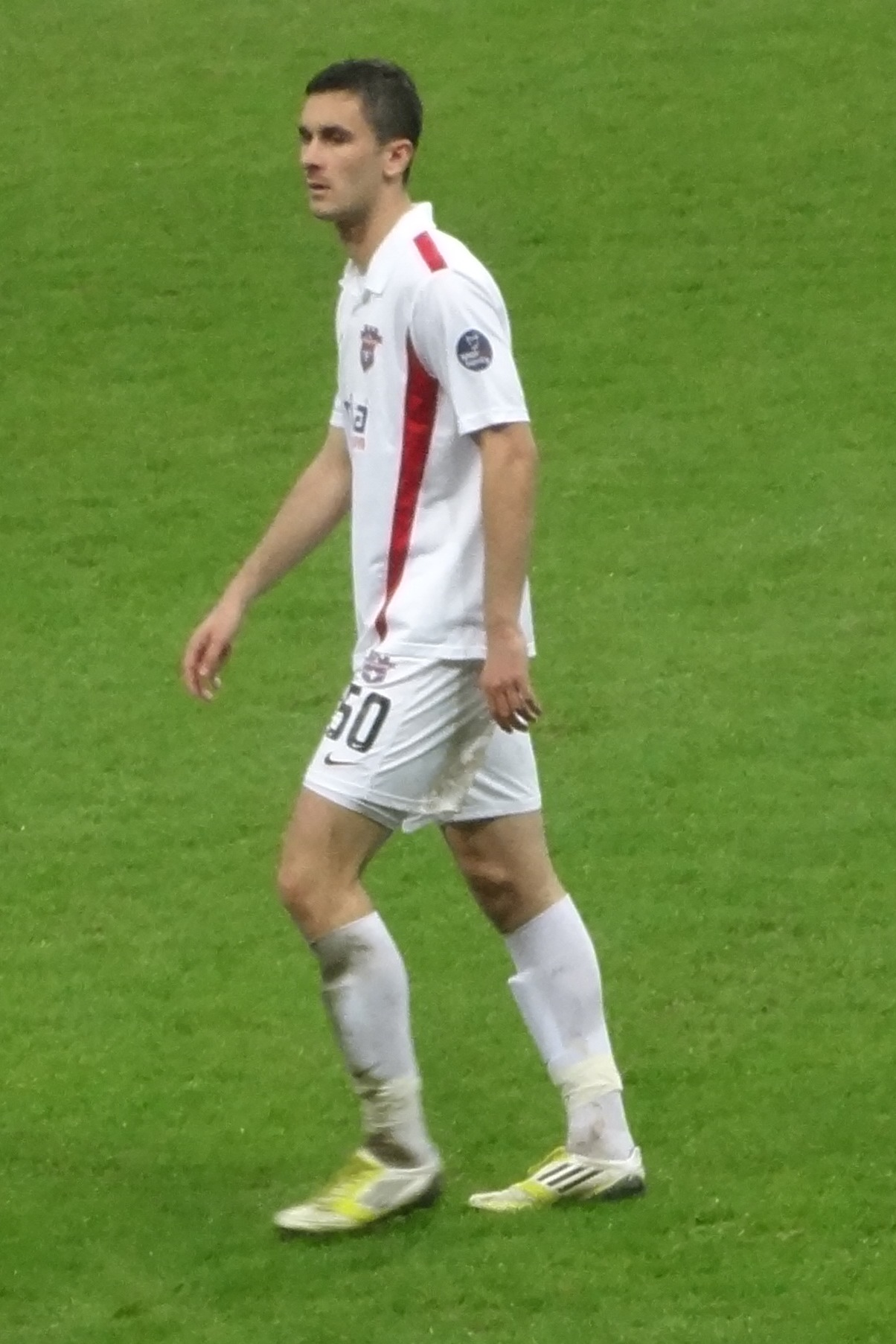
- Kecojević with Gaziantepspor in 2013

Personal information
- Full name: Ivan Kecojević
- Date of birth: 10 April 1988 (age 38)
- Place of birth: Bar, SR Montenegro, Yugoslavia
- Height: 1.91 m (6 ft 3 in)
- Position: Centre back

Team information
- Current team: CF Intercity
- Number: 22

Senior career*
Years	Team	Apps	(Gls)
2004–2007	Mornar	41	(3)
2007–2009	Teleoptik	40	(1)
2009–2010	→ Čukarički (loan)	25	(0)
2010–2012	OFK Beograd	62	(4)
2012–2014	Gaziantepspor	46	(1)
2014–2017	FC Zürich	110	(5)
2017–2019	Cádiz	56	(4)
2019–2021	Albacete	59	(0)
2021-2023	CF Intercity	0	(0)

International career^{‡}
2008–2010	Montenegro U21	10	(0)
2012–2013	Montenegro	5	(0)
- * Club domestic league appearances and goals as of 31 May 2021 ‡ National team caps and goals as of 16 November 2012

Ivan Kecojević (Montenegrin Cyrillic: Иван Кецојевић, born 10 April 1988) is a Montenegrin former footballer who played as a central defender.

== Club career ==
=== Early career ===
Born in Bar, he started playing in his hometown club FK Mornar. He made his debut for the senior squad in the 2004–05 Montenegrin First League. After 2006 when Montenegro separated and formed its own league, Kecojević still played the first six months of the 2006–07 season, when, during the winter break he moved to Serbia and signed with FK Teleoptik. Teleoptik is known for being FK Partizan's satellite club, and most better players end up having good prospects of later earning a chance in Partizan's main team, or other Serbian top league clubs.

Kecojević played with Teleoptik for two and a half seasons, before getting a chance in the Serbian SuperLiga by being loaned to Čukarički. There he became a regular player making 25 league appearances that season. Unsurprisingly, in the following summer of 2010, he signed a three-year contract with another SuperLiga club, OFK Beograd.

=== Gaziantepspor ===
Kecojević signed for Gaziantepspor in August 2012 on a four-year contract. In a match against Beşiktaş, he attempted to go on the field in only briefs without any shorts on.

=== Zürich ===
On 9 January 2013, Kecojević signed for FC Zürich, after which club chairman Ancillo Canepa told journalists that "In Ivan we got an excellent, experienced player, focused one hundred percent on football." He won the 2013–14 Swiss Cup and 2015–16 Swiss Cup with Zürich. In June 2017, his contract expired.

=== Cádiz / Albacete ===
On 9 August 2017, Kecojević signed a one-year contract with Segunda División club Cádiz. On 18 August 2019, he moved to fellow league team Albacete Balompié on a three-year deal.

== International career ==
Since 2008, he has been a regular player of the Montenegro national under-21 football team. Under coach Branko Brnović, he began appearing for the Montenegrin senior side in the 2014 World Cup qualification phase. He made his senior debut for Montenegro in a November 2012 FIFA World Cup qualification match against San Marino and has earned a total of five caps, scoring no goals. His final international appearance was an October 2013 World Cup qualification match against Moldova.
