= Ciudad Deportiva Andrés Iniesta =

Training ground of Albacete Balompié

Coordinates: 38°58′05″N 01°51′13″W

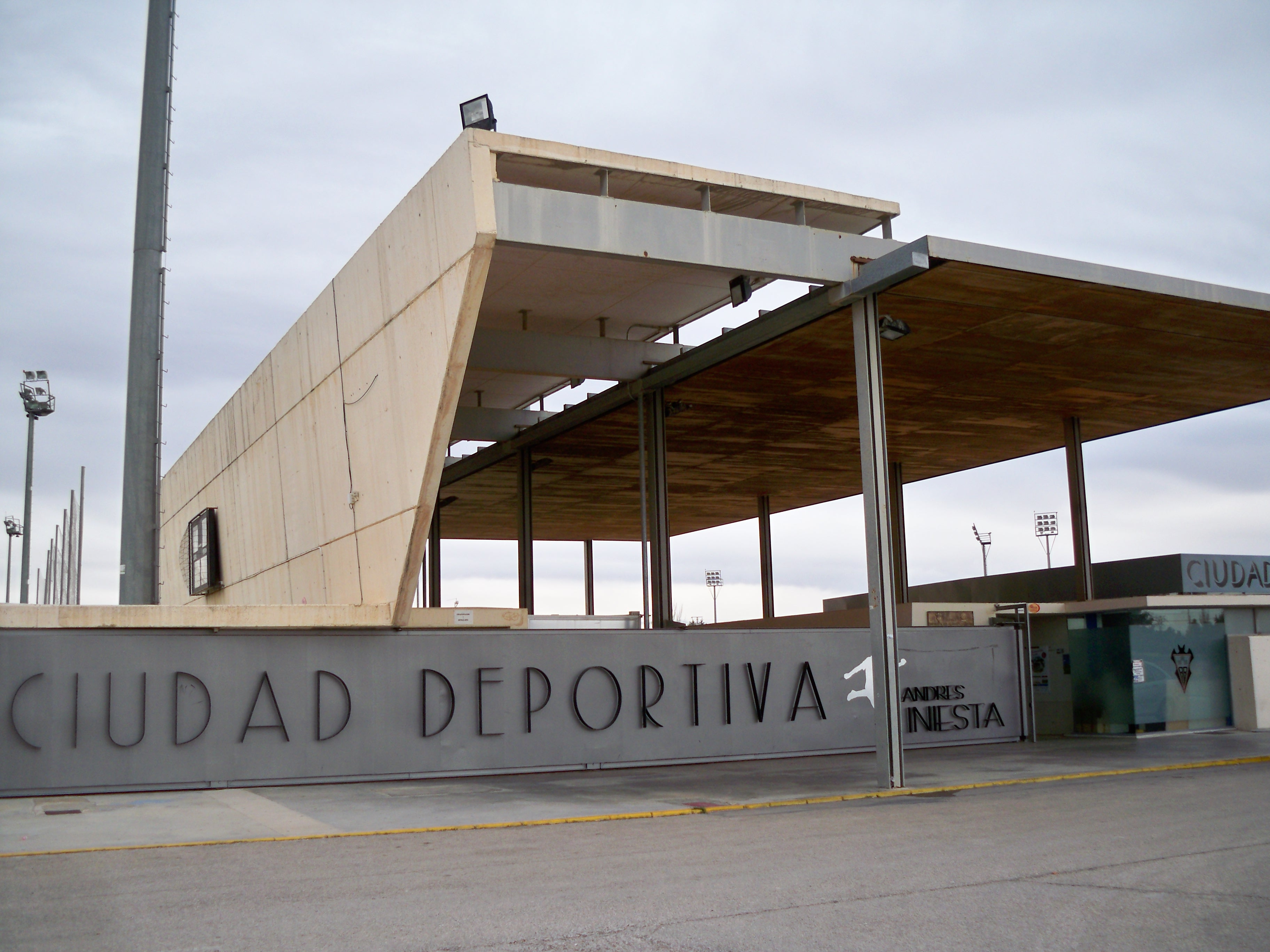
- Interactive map of Ciudad Deportiva Andrés Iniesta
- Location: Albacete; Castilla–La Mancha, Spain
- Owner: Albacete Balompié
- Type: Football training facility

Construction
- Built: April 19, 2005

Tenant
- Albacete Balompié (training) (2005-)

Website
- Ciudad Deportiva Andrés Iniesta

The Ciudad Deportiva Andrés Iniesta, is the training ground of Albacete Balompié who are currently playing in the Spanish Segunda División. Occupying a total area of 75,000 m² at the south of Albacete, the construction of the complex was launched in March 1998 and completed in April 2005. The stadium is named after Spanish footballer Andrés Iniesta.

== Facilities ==
- The Central Stadium with a capacity of 3,000 seats, is the home stadium of Atlético Albacete, the reserve team of Albacete Balompié.
- 1 natural grass pitch.
- 3 artificial pitches.
- Service building with gymnasium.
