= Tomeu Nadal =

Spanish m footballer (born 1989)

Personal information
- Full name: Bartomeu Nadal Mesquida
- Date of birth: 8 February 1989 (age 37)
- Place of birth: Manacor, Spain
- Height: 1.87 m (6 ft 2 in)
- Position: Goalkeeper

Youth career
- Mallorca

Senior career*
Years	Team	Apps	(Gls)
2008–2011	Mallorca B	48	(0)
2011–2013	Getafe B	39	(0)
2013–2016	Gimnàstic	14	(0)
2016	Mallorca	0	(0)
2016–2021	Albacete	189	(0)
2021–2023	Oviedo	17	(0)
2023–2025	Tenerife	8	(0)
2025	Burgos	0	(0)
Total		315	(0)
- * Club domestic league appearances and goals

Bartomeu "Tomeu" Nadal Mesquida (born 8 February 1989) is a Spanish former professional footballer who played as a goalkeeper.

== Club career ==
Born in Manacor, Balearic Islands, Nadal was a product of RCD Mallorca's youth system. He made his debut as a senior with the B team in 2008, spending several seasons with them in the Tercera División and Segunda División B. He was also third choice for the main squad in La Liga, behind Dudu Aouate, Germán Lux and Miguel Ángel Moyá.

On 28 June 2011, Nadal signed a two-year deal with Getafe CF, being assigned to the reserves in the third division. On 13 July 2013, he joined Gimnàstic de Tarragona in the same tier.

A backup to Manolo Reina, Nadal appeared sparingly during the 2013–14 season. On 21 February 2014, he was suspended until June after being irregularly lined up in a 2–0 home win against CD Atlético Baleares (which Nàstic subsequently lost 3–0 after a court decision).

Nadal agreed to a new two-year contract with the Catalans on 8 July 2014, but continued to play understudy to Reina during the campaign. On 9 September 2015, he made his professional debut by starting a 2–2 home draw against Girona FC in the second round of the Copa del Rey, also saving one penalty in the 5–4 shootout win.

On 27 January 2016, Nadal cut ties with Gimnàstic. On 19 February, he returned to his previous club Mallorca until 30 June.

On 4 July 2016, Nadal signed for Albacete Balompié, recently relegated to division three. He was an undisputed starter during the campaign, contributing 43 appearances – play-offs included – as his side returned to the second tier at the first attempt.

Nadal made his professional league debut on 20 August 2017 at the age of 28 years and six months, keeping a clean sheet in a 0–0 away draw with Granada CF. On 29 October 2018, he agreed to an extension at the Estadio Carlos Belmonte until June 2021.

On 5 August 2021, the free agent Nadal signed a two-year contract with Real Oviedo also in the second division. He remained in that league subsequently, with CD Tenerife and Burgos CF.

On 8 June 2025, Nadal retired from professional football at the age of 36, and immediately joined CD Castellón's backroom staff.
