= Yaimil Medina =

Venezuelan footballer (born 1999)

Personal information
- Full name: Yaimil José Medina Rodríguez
- Date of birth: 24 July 1999 (age 27)
- Place of birth: Puerto Ordaz, Venezuela
- Height: 1.78 m (5 ft 10 in)
- Position: Winger

Team information
- Current team: TS Galaxy
- Number: 37

Youth career
- Mineros de Guayana

Senior career*
Years	Team	Apps	(Gls)
2016–2018	Mineros de Guayana	41	(1)
2018–2021	Albacete B	32	(12)
2019–2020	→ Marbella (loan)	16	(1)
2020–2021	→ Recreativo (loan)	20	(5)
2021–2022	Albacete	6	(0)
2022–2023	Mineros de Guayana	13	(1)
2023—	TS Galaxy	11	(1)
- * Club domestic league appearances and goals as of 21 July 2022

Yaimil José Medina Rodríguez (born 24 July 1999) is a Venezuelan footballer who plays as a right winger for TS Galaxy.

== Club career ==
Born in Puerto Ordaz, Medina was a Mineros de Guayana youth graduate. He made his first team – and Primera División – debut on 20 March 2016, aged just 16, coming on as a second-half substitute in a 1–0 away win against Deportivo JBL.

Medina scored his first goal on 27 January 2018, netting the game's only in an away defeat of Deportivo Anzoátegui. On 21 June, he moved abroad and joined Albacete Balompié, being initially assigned to the reserves in Tercera División.

On 18 June 2019, after scoring 12 goals for Alba's B-team, Medina was loaned to Segunda División B side Marbella FC, for one year. On 27 July of the following year, he moved to fellow third division side Recreativo de Huelva also in a temporary deal.
