= Alberto Benito (footballer, born 1992) =

Spanish professional footballer

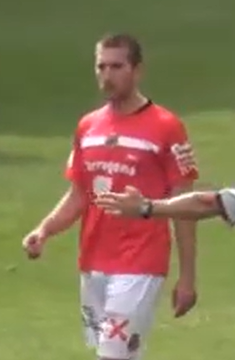
- Benito playing for Gimnàstic in 2013

Personal information
- Full name: Alberto Benito Correa
- Date of birth: 13 June 1992 (age 34)
- Place of birth: Altafulla, Spain
- Height: 1.77 m (5 ft 9 1/2 in)
- Position: Right-back

Team information
- Current team: Reus FCR
- Number: 2

Youth career
- 2000–2004: Altafulla
- 2004–2011: Gimnàstic

Senior career*
Years	Team	Apps	(Gls)
2011–2012	Pobla Mafumet	39	(0)
2012–2013	Gimnàstic	29	(0)
2013–2015	Sporting Gijón B	48	(1)
2015–2017	Reus	61	(2)
2017–2019	Zaragoza	53	(0)
2019–2021	Albacete	57	(0)
2021–2022	Deportivo La Coruña	2	(0)
2022	Cultural Leonesa	5	(0)
2023–	Reus FCR	89	(3)
- * Club domestic league appearances and goals as of 7 May 2026

Alberto Benito Correa (born 13 June 1992) is a Spanish professional footballer who plays as a right-back for Segunda Federación club Reus FC Reddis.

== Club career ==
Born in Altafulla, Tarragona, Catalonia, Benito finished his development at Gimnàstic de Tarragona. He made his senior debut for the farm team in 2010–11, in the Tercera División.

Benito was promoted to Nàstic's first team in Segunda División B on 10 July 2012. On 23 July 2013, he signed a two-year deal with Sporting de Gijón B of the same league after his contract expired.

On 7 July 2015, free agent Benito agreed to a two-year contract with CF Reus Deportiu, still in the third division. He contributed 30 appearances (all as a starter) during the season as the club achieved promotion to Segunda División.

Benito made his professional debut on 20 August 2016, starting and scoring in the last minute of a 1–0 away win against RCD Mallorca. He played a further 30 matches until the end of the campaign, helping to an 11th-place finish.

On 13 June 2017, Benito joined Real Zaragoza on a two-year deal. On 28 June 2019, he signed with fellow second division side Albacete Balompié for two seasons.

Benito split 2021–22 in the newly created Primera División RFEF, with Deportivo de La Coruña and Cultural y Deportiva Leonesa.
