= Karim Azamoum =

French footballer (born 1990)

Personal information
- Date of birth: 17 January 1990 (age 36)
- Place of birth: Rognac, France
- Height: 1.78 m (5 ft 10 in)
- Position: Attacking midfielder

Youth career
- Auxerre

Senior career*
Years	Team	Apps	(Gls)
2010–2011	Agde	23	(4)
2011–2013	Hyères	60	(12)
2013–2016	Troyes II	24	(9)
2013–2018	Troyes	105	(13)
2018–2019	Cádiz	30	(13)
2019	→ Elche (loan)	16	(8)
2019–2021	Albacete	46	(12)
2021–2022	Troyes	7	(1)
- * Club domestic league appearances and goals as of 10 December 2021

Karim Azamoum (born 17 January 1990) is a French professional footballer who plays as an attacking midfielder.

== Career ==
After making his debut in the French lower divisions, Azamoum joined Ligue 2 side Troyes AC in 2013. He made his full professional debut a few weeks later, coming on the pitch in the second half of a 3–0 victory over Châteauroux in September 2013.

On 14 February 2016, he scored a brace contributing to Troyes' 3–2 win away to Gazélec Ajaccio in Ligue 1.

On 17 July 2018, Segunda División side Cádiz CF reached an agreement for the transfer of Azamoum, who agreed to a three-year contract with the club. The following 9 January, after being rarely used, he moved to fellow league team Elche CF on a six-month loan deal.

On 11 July 2019, Azamoum agreed to a three-year contract with Albacete Balompié also in the second division. He terminated his contract on 1 February 2021, and returned to his former side Troyes.

== Personal life ==
Azamoum holds both French and Algerian nationalities.
