= Miguel Ángel (footballer, born May 1998) =

Spanish footballer

Personal information
- Full name: Miguel Ángel Gómez López
- Date of birth: 15 May 1998 (age 28)
- Place of birth: Casas-Ibáñez, Spain
- Height: 1.91 m (6 ft 3 in)
- Position: Forward

Youth career
- Albacer

Senior career*
Years	Team	Apps	(Gls)
2017–2022	Albacete B	37	(13)
2017	→ Almansa (loan)	16	(6)
2019–2022	Albacete	8	(0)
2020–2021	→ Getafe B (loan)	9	(1)
2022	Socuéllamos	6	(0)
2022–2023	Villarrobledo	14	(0)
- * Club domestic league appearances and goals as of 18 December 2022

Miguel Ángel Gómez López (Spanish pronunciation: [miˈɣel ˈaŋxel ˈɣomeθ]; born 15 May 1998), known as Miguel Ángel, is a Spanish footballer who plays as a forward.

== Club career ==
Born in Casas-Ibáñez, Albacete, Castile-La Mancha, Miguel Ángel represented UD Albacer as a youth. In 2017 he joined Albacete Balompié, being immediately loaned to Tercera División side UD Almansa for the season.

Miguel Ángel made his senior debut on 20 August 2017, starting and scoring a brace in a 2–1 home win against CD Villacañas. On 20 December, he was recalled by his parent club, and was assigned to the reserves also in the fourth division.

Miguel Ángel made his professional debut on 2 March 2019, coming on as a late substitute for Néstor Susaeta in a 0–1 away loss against Cádiz CF in the Segunda División. However, he spent most of the 2019–20 campaign nursing a knee injury.

On 5 October 2020, Miguel Ángel was loaned to Getafe CF B in the third division, for one year.
