= Álvaro Arroyo =

Spanish footballer (born 1988)

Personal information
- Full name: Álvaro Arroyo Martínez
- Date of birth: 22 July 1988 (age 38)
- Place of birth: Madrid, Spain
- Height: 1.80 m (5 ft 11 in)
- Position: Right-back

Youth career
- 2005–2007: Rayo Vallecano

Senior career*
Years	Team	Apps	(Gls)
2006	Rayo Vallecano	1	(0)
2007–2009	Rayo Vallecano B	64	(1)
2009–2012	Getafe B	71	(1)
2012–2015	Getafe	33	(1)
2012–2013	→ Alcorcón (loan)	6	(0)
2016–2021	Albacete	164	(3)
- * Club domestic league appearances and goals as of 8 May 2021

Álvaro Arroyo Martínez (born 22 July 1988) is a Spanish professional footballer who plays as a right-back.

== Club career ==
=== Getafe ===
Born in Madrid, Arroyo made his senior debut with local Rayo Vallecano, appearing with the reserves in the Tercera División. In summer 2009 he signed with neighbouring Getafe CF, also being assigned to the B team in the same tier and helping to promotion to Segunda División B for the first time ever.

Arroyo first appeared in the third tier on 29 August 2010, playing the full 90 minutes in a 1–0 home win against Atlético Madrid B. He finished the season with seven games, as the side retained their league status (all starts).

Benefitting from a string of injuries to the first team's defensive sector, Arroyo begun training with the Luis García-led squad. On 1 April 2012, he was an unused substitute in a 3–0 La Liga away loss against Atlético Madrid and, nine days later, made his debut in the competition after replacing Pedro Ríos for the last minute of a 4–0 defeat at FC Barcelona. On the 16th, he played the entire match as the hosts crushed Sevilla FC 5–1.

Arroyo made 17 competitive appearances in the 2014–15 campaign, as Getafe again managed to avoid relegation. On 3 June 2015, he left the club after his contract expired.

=== Albacete ===
On 28 June 2016, after one year of inactivity, Arroyo joined Albacete Balompié of the third division. He played 40 matches in his first year– play-offs included – scoring against Zamudio SD (4–0 away victory) and SD Amorebieta (1–0, at home) in the regular season in an eventual promotion.

In late December 2018 Arroyo, at the time the team captain, agreed to an extension until 30 June 2021.
