= Roman Zozulya =

Ukrainian footballer

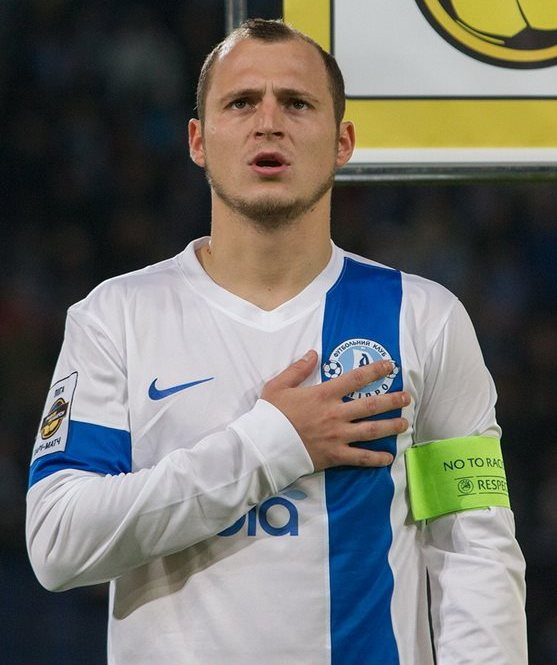
- Zozulya with Dnipro in 2016

Personal information
- Full name: Roman Vyacheslavovych Zozulya
- Date of birth: 17 November 1989 (age 36)
- Place of birth: Kiev, Ukrainian SSR, Soviet Union (now Kyiv, Ukraine)
- Height: 1.76 m (5 ft 9 in)
- Position: Striker

Youth career
- 2002–2006: Dynamo Kyiv

Senior career*
Years	Team	Apps	(Gls)
2006–2011	Dynamo Kyiv	35	(3)
2006	→ Dynamo-3 Kyiv	1	(0)
2006–2008	→ Dynamo-2 Kyiv	59	(10)
2011–2016	Dnipro	85	(22)
2016–2017	Betis	6	(0)
2017	→ Rayo Vallecano (loan)	0	(0)
2017–2021	Albacete	142	(26)
2021–2022	Fuenlabrada	35	(3)
2022–2023	Rayo Majadahonda	18	(1)

International career
2005–2006	Ukraine U17	14	(2)
2007–2008	Ukraine U19	15	(4)
2008–2011	Ukraine U21	22	(1)
2010–2016	Ukraine	33	(4)
- * Club domestic league appearances and goals as of 18:03, 18 March 2025 (UTC)

Roman Vyacheslavovych Zozulya (Ukrainian: Роман В'ячеславович Зозуля, born 17 November 1989) is a Ukrainian former professional footballer who played as a striker.

He played in the Ukrainian Premier League for Dynamo Kyiv and Dnipro. In 2016 he moved to Spain, playing six La Liga games for Real Betis before featuring in 175 Segunda División games for Albacete and Fuenlabrada, scoring 19 goals.

Zozulya made his international debut for Ukraine in 2010, and made 33 appearances and scored 4 international goals over the next six years. He was part of their squad at UEFA Euro 2016.

== Club career ==
=== Dynamo Kyiv ===
Born in Kyiv, Zozulya was a product of the Dynamo youth system progressing through Dynamo-3 and Dynamo-2. In 2008, after the 2007–08 season he was promoted to the main team

=== Dnipro ===
On 27 February 2014, in a Europa League match against Tottenham Hotspur, Zozulya was sent off after he directed a head-butt towards Jan Vertonghen. Zozulya was sent off and had to be restrained from attacking Vertonghen, who was accused of faking the degree of contact. Tottenham went on to win the game 3–1, knocking Dnipro out.

Zozulya was a member of the Dnipro team that reached the final of the Europa League in the following season. On 12 March 2015, he scored the only goal of a home win over AFC Ajax in the first leg of the round of 16. He missed the final defeat to Sevilla FC in Warsaw due to injury.

=== Betis ===
On 27 July 2016, Zozulya signed a three-year contract with La Liga side Real Betis. He made his debut on 11 September in a 3–2 win at Valencia CF, as an 80th-minute substitute for Álex Alegría. He played six games, starting once on 22 January in a goalless draw at home to Sporting Gijón.

=== Rayo Vallecano ===
On 31 January 2017, Zozulya joined Rayo Vallecano on loan until the end of the season. His arrival was met with protests from the club's fans, unhappy over his purported far-right links after a picture of him wearing a shirt featuring the Tryzub and the logo of the Right Sector with lyrics of poet Taras Shevchenko was uncovered. Zozulya vehemently denied any such links in an open letter to Rayo's fans, declaring that he has only assisted the legitimate Ukrainian army during the Russian military intervention in Ukraine. On 1 February 2017, Zozulya had his contract cancelled due to the reactions of Rayo fans and returned to Betis. This meant that he could not play anymore in the 2016–17 season because the Royal Spanish Football Federation rules say players cannot register for more than two teams in one campaign.

=== Albacete ===
On 8 September 2017, free agent Zozulya signed a one-year contract with Albacete Balompié. On 25 March 2019, Zozulya endured more harassment during an Albacete away game against Lugo, when the fans of the latter club sang chants aimed at Zozulya, explicitly wishing him death for supposedly supporting the Nazi political movement. As a result of the incident, the fans of Albacete requested that La Liga seriously punish Lugo. Zozulya received the best player award for the month of October 2019, based on the fans' votes. On 15 December 2019, the league game between Rayo Vallecano and Albacete was abandoned by the referee, after abuse and threats from the home fans over Zozulya's alleged far-right-wing political views. The second half of the game was scheduled to be played the following June, following the resumption of football after the coronavirus pandemic.

=== Later career ===
On 31 July 2021, after Alba's relegation, Zozulya signed a two-year contract with fellow second division side CF Fuenlabrada.

On 8 December 2022, Zozulya signed for Primera Federación club Rayo Majadahonda on a deal until the end of the 2022–23 season. On 21 January, away to Deportivo de La Coruña, the home fans chanting allegations of Nazism towards Zozulya; the referee suspended the game using protocols for racist chanting, and messages were displayed through the loudspeakers and scoreboards for the chants not to be repeated. He played 18 times for the team from the Community of Madrid, scoring once as an added-time winner in a 2–1 victory away to Real Madrid Castilla, who had led until the 88th minute.

== International career ==
Zozulya debuted for Ukraine on 2 June 2010 against Norway at Ullevaal Stadion in Oslo. He scored a goal after Yevhen Konoplyanka fired a long shot at Jon Knudsen, who fumbled with the ball and let Zozulya kick the ball into the net. He was substituted in the 81st minute. He was member of the Ukrainian 23-man squad for Euro 2016.

== Outside of football ==
=== Civil involvement ===
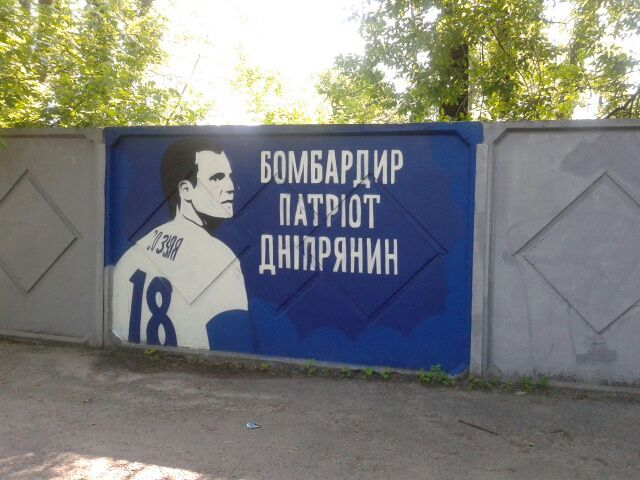
Graffiti praising Zozulya at Dnipro's training ground

Zozulya is the founder of the Narodna Armiya (People's Army) organisation which is a part of the civil volunteer movement helping Ukrainian forces in the war in Donbas. In particular Zozulya's organisation is providing food, clothing and technical equipment to Ukrainian Army and helps families of the military. In 2016, he received a special commendation from the Ministry of Defense of Ukraine for his support to the Armed Forces of Ukraine.

Together with Ruslan Rotan Zozulya is also the co-founder and sponsor of the Rotan and Zozulya Academy of Football in Dnipro.

=== Personal life ===
His sister Olena is married with another Ukrainian football player Kyrylo Kovalets.

== Career statistics ==
=== Club ===
As of 26 February 2021

Appearances and goals by club, season and competition
Club	Season	League			Cup		Europe		Super Cup		Total	
Club	Season	Division	Apps	Goals	Apps	Goals	Apps	Goals	Apps	Goals	Apps	Goals
Dynamo Kyiv	2007–08	Ukrainian Premier League	1	0	0	0	0	0	0	0	1	0
Dynamo Kyiv	2008–09	Ukrainian Premier League	11	1	3	0	1	0	0	0	15	1
Dynamo Kyiv	2009–10	Ukrainian Premier League	11	2	1	1	0	0	1	0	13	3
Dynamo Kyiv	2010–11	Ukrainian Premier League	12	0	3	1	8	1	0	0	23	2
Dynamo Kyiv	Total		35	3	7	2	9	1	1	0	52	6
Dnipro Dnipropetrovsk	2011–12	Ukrainian Premier League	15	3	2	1	1	0	0	0	18	4
Dnipro Dnipropetrovsk	2012–13	Ukrainian Premier League	23	8	2	0	9	3	0	0	34	11
Dnipro Dnipropetrovsk	2013–14	Ukrainian Premier League	24	7	1	0	10	4	0	0	35	11
Dnipro Dnipropetrovsk	2014–15	Ukrainian Premier League	13	1	2	0	9	1	0	0	24	2
Dnipro Dnipropetrovsk	2015–16	Ukrainian Premier League	10	3	4	2	1	0	0	0	15	5
Dnipro Dnipropetrovsk	Total		85	22	11	3	30	8	0	0	126	33
Betis	2016–17	La Liga	6	0	0	0	0	0	0	0	6	0
Albacete	2017–18	Segunda División	30	9	0	0	0	0	0	0	30	9
Albacete	2018–19	Segunda División	37	11	0	0	0	0	0	0	37	11
Albacete	2019–20	Segunda División	38	4	0	0	0	0	0	0	38	4
Albacete	2020–21	Segunda División	24	2	0	0	0	0	0	0	24	2
Albacete	Total		135	26	0	0	0	0	0	0	135	26
Career total			255	51	18	5	39	9	1	0	313	65

=== International ===
As of 14 June 2019

Appearances and goals by national team and year
National team	Year	Apps	Goals
Ukraine	2010	1	1
Ukraine	2011	0	0
Ukraine	2012	4	0
Ukraine	2013	9	2
Ukraine	2014	7	0
Ukraine	2015	1	0
Ukraine	2016	11	1
Total		33	4

Scores and results list Ukraine's goal tally first, score column indicates score after each Zozulya goal.

List of international goals scored by Roman Zozulya
No.	Date	Venue	Opponent	Score	Result	Competition
1	2 June 2010	Ullevaal Stadium, Oslo, Norway	Norway	1–0	1–0	Friendly
2	22 March 2013	National Stadium, Warsaw, Poland	Poland	3–1	3–1	2014 FIFA World Cup qualification
3	15 November 2013	Olimpiyskiy National Sports Complex, Kyiv, Ukraine	France	1–0	2–0	2014 FIFA World Cup qualification
4	29 May 2016	Stadio Olimpico Grande Torino, Turin, Italy	Romania	1–1	4–3	Friendly

== Honors ==
Dynamo Kyiv

- Ukrainian Premier League: 2008–09
- Ukrainian Super Cup: 2009, 2011

FC Dnipro Dnipropetrovsk

- UEFA Europa League: runner-up 2014–15

=== Orders ===
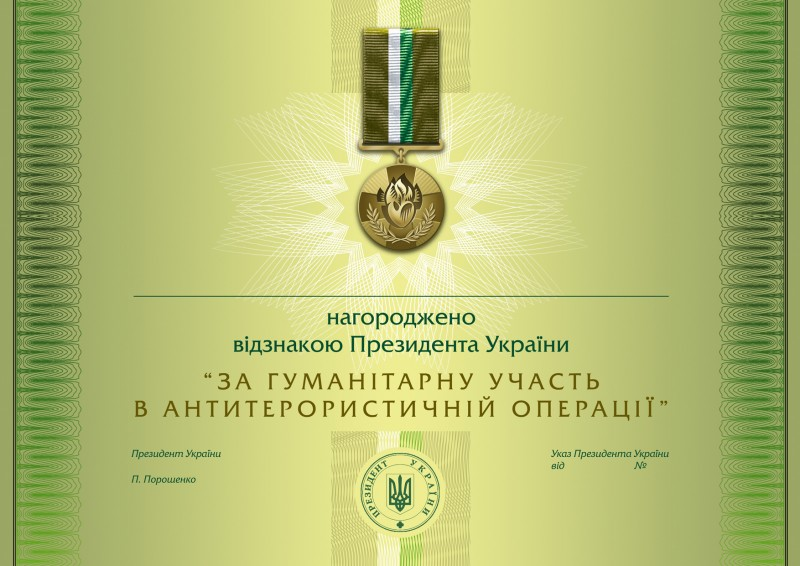

- Ukraine: Decoration of the President of Ukraine for Humanitarian Participation in the Anti-Terrorist Operation
- Ukraine: Honorary badge of the Chief of General Staff for Services to the Armed Forces of Ukraine
