= José Antonio Caro (footballer, born 1993) =

Spanish footballer

Personal information
- Full name: José Antonio Caro Martínez
- Date of birth: 8 March 1993 (age 33)
- Place of birth: Estepa, Spain
- Height: 1.82 m (5 ft 11 1/2 in)
- Position: Centre-back

Team information
- Current team: Estepona
- Number: 22

Youth career
- Estepa Industrial
- Betis

Senior career*
Years	Team	Apps	(Gls)
2012–2015	Betis B	75	(4)
2013–2016	Betis	8	(0)
2015–2016	→ Elche (loan)	22	(0)
2016–2018	Córdoba	52	(5)
2018–2020	Albacete	39	(1)
2020–2022	Osijek	5	(0)
2022	UCAM Murcia	10	(0)
2022–2023	Linares	33	(1)
2023–2024	Melilla	30	(2)
2024–	Estepona	61	(3)
- * Club domestic league appearances and goals as of 7 May 2026

José Antonio Caro Martínez (born 8 March 1993) is a Spanish professional footballer who plays as a central defender for Estepona.

== Club career ==
Born in Estepa, Province of Seville, Caro played youth football for local Real Betis, and made his senior debut with the B team in the 2011–12 season, playing one game in the Segunda División B.

Caro appeared in his first competitive match with the Andalusians' main squad on 3 November 2013, coming on as a substitute for Damien Perquis in the 55th minute of a 3–2 La Liga away loss against Málaga CF. He was handed his first start four days later, featuring the entire 1–0 win at Vitória S.C. in the group stage of the UEFA Europa League.

On 21 August 2015, Caro was loaned to Segunda División club Elche CF in a season-long deal. On 1 July of the following year, he terminated his contract with Betis and signed a two-year deal with Córdoba CF hours later. He scored his first goal as a professional on 8 October 2016, closing a 1–1 away draw with CD Numancia.

On 27 July 2018, free agent Caro signed a two-year contract with Albacete Balompié, still in the second division. He made 17 appearances in his debut campaign to help his side finish fourth, scoring in the 3–0 home victory over Córdoba on 2 September.

Caro moved abroad for the first time in September 2020, joining NK Osijek of the Croatian First Football League on a three-year deal. He returned to Spain and its third tier in the 2022 January transfer window, however, with UCAM Murcia CF.

Caro remained in the lower leagues until his retirement, representing Linares Deportivo, UD Melilla and CD Estepona FS.
