= Estadio Carlos Belmonte =

Football stadium in Albacete, Spain

Carlos Belmonte
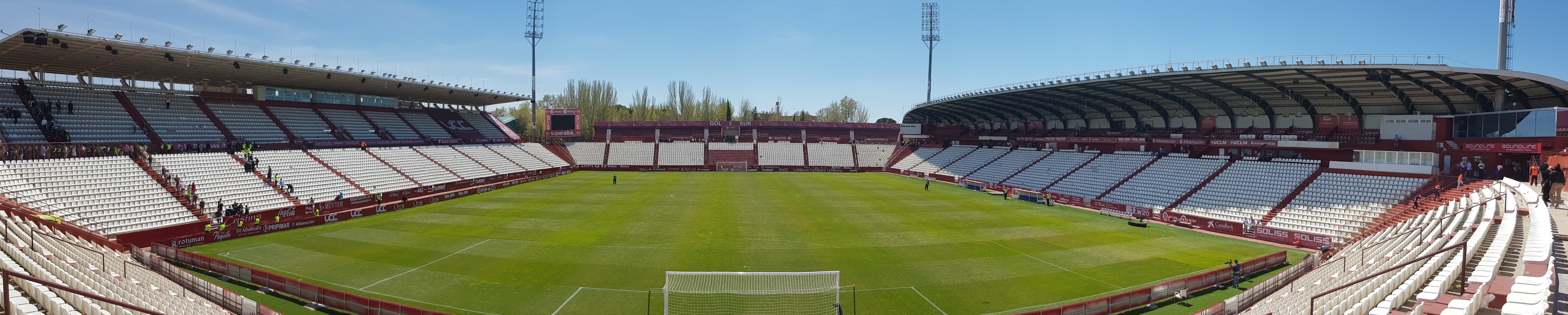
- Interactive map of Carlos Belmonte
- Location: Albacete, Spain
- Coordinates: 38°58′52″N 1°51′08″W
- Owner: Ayuntamiento de Albacete
- Operator: Ayuntamiento de Albacete
- Capacity: 17,524
- Field size: 105 metres (115 yd) x 68 metres (74 yd)

Construction
- Opened: 1960

Tenants
- Albacete (1960–present); Spain national football team (selected matches)

Estadio Carlos Belmonte is a multi-purpose stadium in Albacete, Spain. It is used mostly for football matches and is the home ground of Albacete Balompié.

== History ==
The stadium holds 17,524 and was built in 1960. It replaced the ageing Campo del Parque and was inaugurated on 9 September 1960 with a match against Sevilla FC, which attended more than 12,000 people. It had an initial capacity of 10,000. Floodlights were added in 1970 and a cover over the west side in 1979. The lighting towers also were constructed in 1970s. Following promotion to La Primera in 1991, the east side of the ground was developed with the building of a twin-decked cantilevered stand. This took the capacity of the ground up to 14,000 with only half of them being seated places. Further development in 1998 saw the removal of the athletics track, and the building of two open banks of seats at either end of the pitch. The north bank development also included new changing facilities. The pitch was also lowered in 1998 and a new stand was erected on the west side. This resulted in an increased capacity of 17,524. The last reconstruction of the stadium took place in 2017 bankrolled by the new club owner, Skyline International. The changes aimed to modernize the image of the Estadio Carlos Belmonte introducing new stands for VIP guests, press room, changing rooms and tunnels.

== Matches ==
Spain have played four qualifiers since 1999, and an international friendly, at the ground, never conceding a goal. They played their last qualifying game for the 2014 FIFA World Cup against Georgia at the stadium on 15 October 2013, winning 2–0 with goals from Álvaro Negredo and Juan Mata.

Fernando Torres scored his first professional goal in senior football in this stadium in 2001, in a Segunda División clash with Atlético Madrid.
