= Álvaro Peña (Spanish footballer) =

Spanish footballer (born 1991)

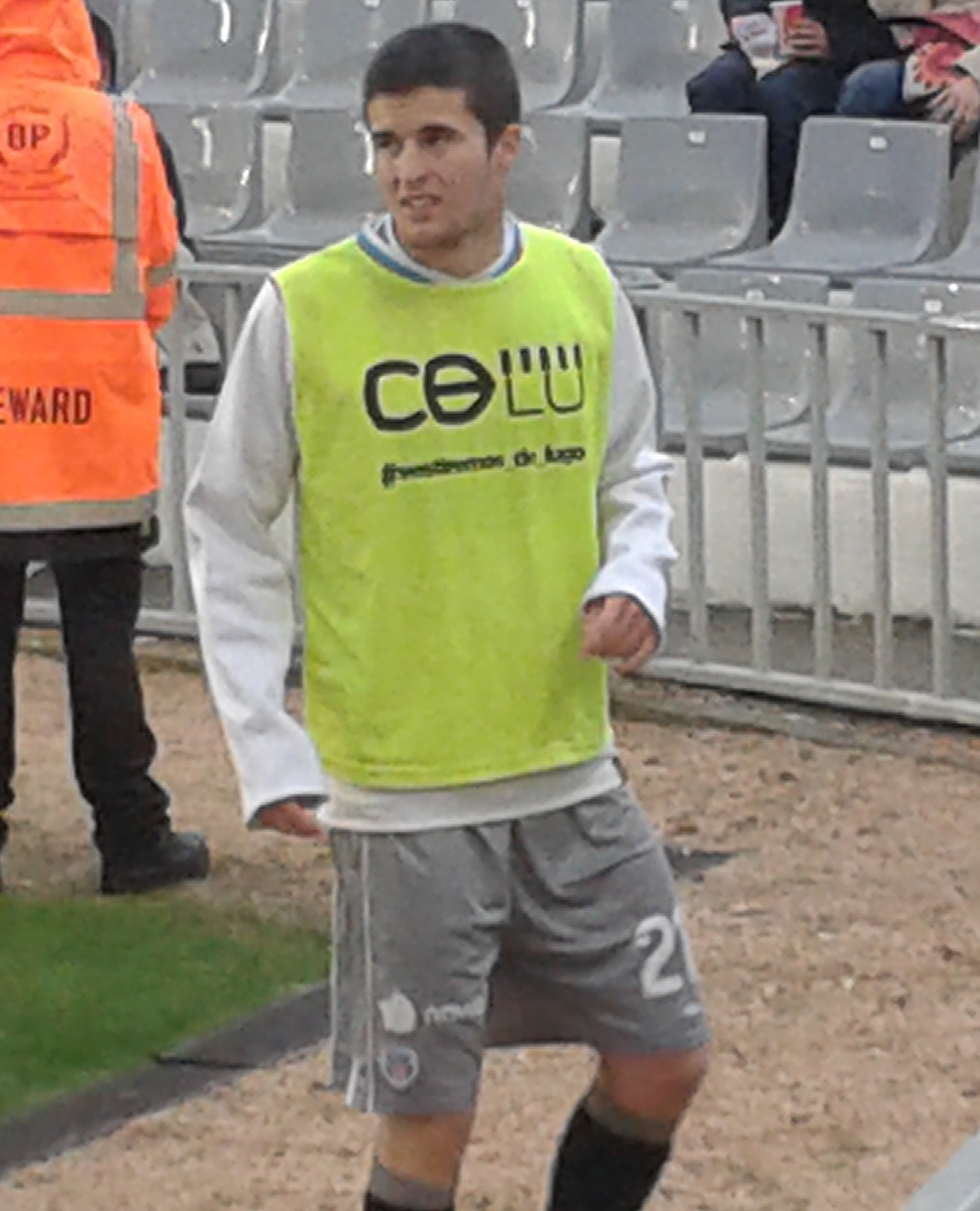

Personal information
- Full name: Álvaro Peña Herrero
- Date of birth: 24 October 1991 (age 35)
- Place of birth: Bilbao, Spain
- Height: 1.78 m (5 ft 10 in)
- Position: Midfielder

Team information
- Current team: Barakaldo

Youth career
- 2006–2010: Athletic Bilbao

Senior career*
| Years | Team | Apps | (Gls) |
| 2009–2011 | Basconia | 52 | (5) |
| 2011–2013 | Bilbao Athletic | 63 | (2) |
| 2012 | Athletic Bilbao | 0 | (0) |
| 2013–2015 | Lugo | 65 | (4) |
| 2015–2017 | Racing Santander | 72 | (8) |
| 2017–2019 | Alcorcón | 58 | (7) |
| 2019–2021 | Albacete | 52 | (2) |
| 2019–2020 | → Mirandés (loan) | 34 | (2) |
| 2021–2022 | Amorebieta | 37 | (2) |
| 2022–2024 | Almere City | 54 | (6) |
| 2024–2025 | Andorra | 34 | (5) |
| 2025–2026 | Racing Ferrol | 17 | (1) |
| 2026– | Barakaldo | 9 | (1) |
- * Club domestic league appearances and goals as of 19:03, 29 April 2026 (UTC)

Álvaro Peña Herrero (born 24 October 1991) is a Spanish professional footballer who plays mainly as a central midfielder for Primera Federación club Barakaldo.

Having been brought up at Athletic Bilbao (two competitive appearances), he scored 17 Segunda División goals in 246 games over seven seasons, playing for Lugo, Alcorcón, Albacete, Mirandés and Amorebieta.

== Club career ==
Born in Bilbao, Biscay, Peña joined local Athletic Bilbao's youth system in 2006, aged 15. After appearing for farm team CD Basconia, he went on to spend two full seasons with the B side in the Segunda División B.

Peña made his debut with the main squad on 28 November 2012, starting in a 2–0 away win against Hapoel Ironi Kiryat Shmona F.C. in the group stage of the UEFA Europa League. He scored two goals in 34 matches for the reserves in his last year, playoffs included.

On 3 July 2013, Peña signed a two-year contract with Segunda División club CD Lugo. He made his league debut on 17 August, playing 65 minutes in a 0–0 home draw against CD Numancia, and scored his first goal as a professional on 19 October by netting his team's second in a 3–3 draw at Recreativo de Huelva.

Peña joined Racing de Santander of division three in August 2015, on a two-year deal. On 5 July 2017, he returned to the second tier after agreeing to a two-year contract at AD Alcorcón.

On 17 January 2019, Peña signed a two-and-a-half-year contract with Albacete Balompié, still in the second division. On 2 September, he moved to CD Mirandés of the same league on loan for the season.

Upon returning, Peña was a regular starter for Alba as they suffered relegation. On 21 July 2021, he joined second-division newcomers SD Amorebieta.

On 25 August 2022, Peña signed a one-year contract (with an option to extend) with Almere City FC in the Dutch Eerste Divisie. He won promotion to the Eredivisie in his debut campaign via the play-offs, a first-ever for the club in its 22-year history to which he contributed five goals from 31 appearances.

Peña scored his only goal in the Dutch top tier on 17 December 2023, in a 5–0 home victory over SBV Vitesse. His side managed to easily avoid relegation, finishing with 34 points.

On 17 July 2024, Peña joined FC Andorra on a one-year deal with an option to extend. On 24 July of the following year, after helping the side to return to the second division at first attempt, he terminated his link.
