= 2024–25 UD Las Palmas season =

UD Las Palmas
2024–25 season
- President: Miguel Ángel Ramírez Alonso
- Manager: Luis Carrión (until 8 October); Diego Martínez (from 8 October)
- Stadium: Estadio Gran Canaria
- La Liga: 19th (relegated)
- Copa del Rey: Round of 32
- Top goalscorer: League: Fábio Silva (10); All: Fábio Silva (10)
- Highest home attendance: 31,192 vs Real Madrid
- Lowest home attendance: 17,566 vs Deportivo Alavés
- Average home league attendance: 23,010
- Biggest win: Ontiñena 0–7 Las Palmas
- Biggest defeat: Elche 4–0 Las Palmas
Home colours	Away colours	Third colours

The 2024–25 season was the 76th season in the history of the UD Las Palmas and the club's second consecutive season in La Liga. In addition to the domestic league, the team participated in the Copa del Rey.

== Players ==
=== First-team squad ===
As of 8 August 2024

Note: Flags indicate national team as defined under FIFA eligibility rules; some limited exceptions apply. Players may hold more than one non-FIFA nationality.

No.	Pos.	Nation	Player
1	GK	NED	Jasper Cillessen
2	MF	ESP	Marvin Park
3	DF	ESP	Mika Mármol
4	DF	ESP	Álex Suárez
5	MF	ESP	Javi Muñoz
6	MF	ESP	Fabio González
7	FW	GUI	Sory Kaba
8	MF	ESP	José Campaña
9	FW	ESP	Marc Cardona
10	MF	ESP	Alberto Moleiro
11	FW	ESP	Benito Ramírez
12	MF	FRA	Enzo Loiodice
13	GK	CRO	Dinko Horkaš
14	MF	ESP	Manu Fuster
15	DF	SCO	Scott McKenna

No.	Pos.	Nation	Player
16	FW	SCO	Oli McBurnie
17	FW	ESP	Jaime Mata
18	MF	ESP	Viti Rozada
19	FW	ESP	Sandro Ramírez
20	MF	ESP	Kirian Rodríguez (captain)
21	MF	ESP	Iván Gil
22	DF	NED	Daley Sinkgraven
23	DF	ESP	Álex Muñoz
24	DF	ESP	Enrique Clemente
25	GK	ESP	Álvaro Valles
28	DF	ESP	Juanma Herzog
—	MF	BEL	Adnan Januzaj (on loan from Sevilla)
—	FW	CMR	Iván Cédric
—	FW	ESP	Pejiño

== Transfers ==
=== In ===
Pos.	Player	Transferred from	Fee	Date	Source
MF	(Spain) Marvin Park	(Spain) Real Madrid	€2,000,000	1 July 2024	
GK	(Netherlands) Jasper Cillessen	(Netherlands) NEC Nijmegen	Undisclosed	1 July 2024	
GK	(Croatia) Dinko Horkaš	(Bulgaria) Lokomotiv Plovdiv	Undisclosed	1 July 2024	
FW	(Spain) Jaime Mata	(Spain) Getafe	Free	1 July 2024	
FW	(Cameroon) Iván Cédric	(Spain) Real Valladolid	Free	1 July 2024	
MF	(Spain) Iván Gil	FC Andorra	Free	1 July 2024	
MF	(Belgium) Adnan Januzaj	(Spain) Sevilla	Loan	24 July 2024	
FW	(Scotland) Oli McBurnie	Free agent	Free	25 July 2024	
MF	(Portugal) Dário Essugo	(Portugal) Sporting CP	Loan	30 August 2024	
FW	(Portugal) Fábio Silva	(England) Wolverhampton Wanderers	Loan	30 August 2024	

=== Out ===
Pos.	Player	Transferred to	Fee	Date	Source
DF	(Mexico) Julián Araujo	(Spain) Barcelona	Loan return	30 June 2024	
MF	(Argentina) Máximo Perrone	(England) Manchester City	Loan return	30 June 2024	
MF	(Spain) Cristian Herrera	(Spain) Deportivo La Coruña	End of contract	1 July 2024	
DF	(Spain) Sergi Cardona	(Spain) Villarreal	End of contract	1 July 2024	
MF	(Morocco) Munir El Haddadi	(Spain) Leganés	End of contract	1 July 2024	
DF	(Spain) Eric Curbelo	(Spain) Sporting Gijón	End of contract	1 July 2024	
GK	(Spain) Aarón Escandell	(Spain) Real Oviedo	Contract termination	9 July 2024	
DF	(Equatorial Guinea) Saúl Coco	(Italy) Torino FC	€7,500,000	17 July 2024	
MF	(Democratic Republic of the Congo) Omenuke Mfulu	(Spain) Deportivo La Coruña	Contract termination	31 July 2024	
FW	(Guinea) Sory Kaba	(Spain) Elche	Loan	30 August 2024	
MF	(Spain) Iván Gil	(Spain) Eibar	Loan	3 January 2025	

== Friendlies ==
=== Pre-season ===
20 July 2024 Friendly	Las Palmas	1–2	Como	Marbella
10:30	Cédric 4'	Report	Cutrone 48'; Strefezza 50'

23 July 2024 Friendly	Las Palmas	0–0	Al Sadd	Marbella
18:30				Stadium: Marbella Football Center; Referee: Manuel Jesús Orellana Cid

27 July 2024 Friendly	Inter Milan	3–0	Las Palmas	Cesena, Italy
19:30				Stadium: Stadio Dino Manuzzi

2 August 2024 Friendly	Las Palmas	2–1	Al Shabab
13:00	Muñoz 45+2'; Januzaj 47'		Carrasco 86'

3 August 2024 Friendly	Las Palmas	4–0	Unión Sur Yaiza	Las Palmas
12:00 UTC+1	Sandro 7', 11'; Bassinga 35'; Fuster 84'			Stadium: Ciudad Deportiva de Barranco Seco; Attendance: 700

8 August 2024 Friendly	Las Palmas	1–0	UD Tamaraceite	Las Palmas
18:30 UTC+1	Gil 70'			Stadium: Ciudad Deportiva de Barranco Seco

11 August 2024 Friendly	Liverpool	0–0	Las Palmas	Liverpool, England
17:00 UTC+1				Stadium: Anfield

== Competitions ==
=== Overall record ===
Competition	First match	Last match	Starting round	Final position	Record							
Competition	First match	Last match	Starting round	Final position	Pld	W	D	L	GF	GA	GD	Win %
La Liga	16 August 2024	24 May 2025	Matchday 1	19th	38	8	8	22	40	61	−21	21.05
Copa del Rey	31 October 2024	5 January 2025	First round	Round of 32	3	2	0	1	9	5	+4	66.67
Total					41	10	8	23	49	66	−17	24.39

Source: Soccerway

=== La Liga ===
==== League table ====
Pos	Team	Pld	W	D	L	GF	GA	GD	Pts	Qualification or relegation
16	Girona	38	11	8	19	44	60	−16	41 (Note: Girona finished ahead of Sevilla on head-to-head goal difference: Sevilla 0–2 Girona, Girona 1–2 Sevilla.)	
17	Sevilla	38	10	11	17	42	55	−13	41	
18	Leganés (R)	38	9	13	16	39	56	−17	40	Relegation to Segunda División
19	Las Palmas (R)	38	8	8	22	40	61	−21	32	Relegation to Segunda División
20	Valladolid (R)	38	4	4	30	26	90	−64	16	Relegation to Segunda División

Source: LaLiga EA Sports
Rules for classification: 1) Points; 2) Head-to-head points; 3) Head-to-head goal difference; 4) Goal difference; 5) Goals scored; 6) Fair-play points
(Note: Head-to-head record is used only after all the matches between the teams in question have been played)
(R) Relegated

==== Results summary ====
Overall								Home						Away					
Pld	W	D	L	GF	GA	GD	Pts	W	D	L	GF	GA	GD	W	D	L	GF	GA	GD
38	8	8	22	40	61	−21	32	4	5	10	21	29	−8	4	3	12	19	32	−13

==== Results by round ====
Round	1	2	3	4	5	6	7	8	9	10	11	12	13	14	15	16	17	18	19	20	21	22	23	24	25	26	27	28	29	30	31	32	33	34
Ground	H	A	H	A	H	A	H	A	H	A	H	A	A	H	A	H	A	H	H	A	H	A	H	A	H	A	A	H	A	H	A	H	A	
Result	D	L	D	L	L	L	D	L	L	W	W	L	W	L	W	W	D	W	L	L	D	L	L	L	L	D	L	D	D	L	W	W	L	
Position	6	14	15	18	19	20	20	20	20	19	18	18	16	17	14	14	14	13	14	14	15	15	15	17	17	17	19	19	19	19	18	17	18	

Updated to match(es) played on 24 April 2024. Source:
A = Away; H = Home; W = Win; D = Draw; L = Loss

==== Matches ====
The league schedule was released on 18 June 2024.

16 August 2024 1	Las Palmas	2–2	Sevilla	Las Palmas
20:30	Nianzou 42' (o.g.); Sandro 71'; Viti (yellow card) 81'; Mármol (yellow card) 90+6'	Report	Suárez 25' (o.g.); Juanlu (yellow card) 34', (goal) 61'; Pedrosa (yellow card) 80'	Stadium: Estadio Gran Canaria; Attendance: 24,843; Referee: Francisco José Hernández Maeso

25 August 2024 2	Leganés	2–1	Las Palmas	Leganés
19:00	Cruz 71'; Franquesa 85'	Report	Ramírez 90+3'	Stadium: Butarque; Attendance: 10,052; Referee: Ricardo de Burgos Bengoetxea

29 August 2024 3	Las Palmas	1–1	Real Madrid	Las Palmas
20:30	Moleiro 5'	Report	Mendy (yellow card) 40'; Júnior 69' (pen.); Militão (yellow card) 88'; Carvajal (yellow card) 90'	Stadium: Estadio Gran Canaria; Attendance: 31,192; Referee: Mateo Busquets Ferrer

1 September 2024 4	Alavés	2–0	Las Palmas	Vitoria-Gasteiz
17:00	Vicente 7'; Guridi (yellow card) 32'; Conechny (yellow card) 45'; Martínez 78'; Abqar (yellow card) 83'	Report		Stadium: Mendizorrotza; Attendance: 16,386; Referee: Víctor García Verdura

15 September 2024 5	Las Palmas	2–3	Athletic Bilbao	Las Palmas
17:30	Sandro 58'; Muñoz 83'		Sancet 7'; N. Williams 30'; Paredes 76'	Stadium: Estadio Gran Canaria; Referee: Miguel Ángel Ortiz Arias

21 September 2024 6	Osasuna	2–1	Las Palmas	Pamplona
16:15	Budimir 39' (pen.); Oroz 60'	Report	Moleiro 41'	Stadium: El Sadar; Attendance: 19,043; Referee: Isidro Díaz de Mera Escuderos

26 September 2024 7	Las Palmas	1–1	Real Betis	Las Palmas
18:00 UTC+1	Moleiro 9'		Lo Celso 45+3'	Stadium: Estadio Gran Canaria; Attendance: 27,722; Referee: José María Sánchez Martínez

30 September 2024 8	Villarreal	3–1	Las Palmas	Villarreal
21:00 UTC+2	Pépé 45'; Barry 84'; Baena 90+7'		Silva 47'	Stadium: Estadio de la Cerámica; Referee: Mario Melero López

5 October 2024 9	Las Palmas	0–1	Celta Vigo	Las Palmas
17:30 UTC+1		Report	Iglesias 28'	Stadium: Estadio Gran Canaria; Referee: Adrián Cordero Vega

21 October 2024 10	Valencia	2–3	Las Palmas	Valencia
21:00 UTC+2				Stadium: Mestalla

26 October 2024 11	Las Palmas	1–0	Girona	Las Palmas
17:30 UTC+1				Stadium: Estadio Gran Canaria

3 November 2024 12	Atlético Madrid	2–0	Las Palmas	Madrid
14:00 UTC+1	Simeone 37'; Lenglet (yellow card) 73'; Sørloth 83'	Report	Viti (yellow card) 88'	Stadium: Cívitas Metropolitano; Attendance: 56,610; Referee: Ricardo De Burgos Bengoetxea

8 November 2024 13	Rayo Vallecano	1–3	Las Palmas	Madrid
21:00 CET (UTC+1)	Gumbau (yellow card) 34'; McKenna 90+2' (o.g.)	Report	Silva 6'; McKenna (yellow card) 10'; Muñoz (yellow card) 45+2'; Essugo (yellow card) 49'; Aridane 62' (o.g.); Fuster 67'	Stadium: Vallecas Stadium; Attendance: 12,978; Referee: Francisco José Hernández Maeso

24 November 2024 14	Las Palmas	2–3	Mallorca	Las Palmas
06:30WET (UTC±0)	Essugo (yellow card) 64', (goal) 77'; Fábio Silva 83'; Mata (yellow card) 88'; Moleiro (yellow card) 90+2'; Álex Suárez (yellow card) 90+2'	Report	Morlanes (yellow card) 43'; Dani Rodríguez 46'; Navarro 56'; Raíllo (yellow card) 68'; Muriqi (red card) 88'; Mojica 90+1'	Stadium: Estadio Gran Canaria; Attendance: 22,940; Referee: Alejandro Muñiz Ruiz

30 November 2024 15	Barcelona	1–2	Las Palmas	Barcelona
14:00 CET (UTC+1)	Raphinha 61'	Report	Sandro 49'; Silva 67'	Stadium: Estadi Olímpic Lluís Companys; Attendance: 43,921; Referee: Adrián Cordero Vega
Note: This match served to commemorate the club's 125th anniversary.

7 December 2024 16	Las Palmas	2–1	Valladolid	Las Palmas
20:00	Sandro 20', 64'; Fábio Silva (yellow card) 26'; Álex Suárez (yellow card) 76'; McKenna (yellow card) 80'; Marvin Park (yellow card) 90+8'	Report	Marcos André 45'; Eray Cömert (yellow card) 49'; Alberto Moleiro (yellow card) 78'; Amath Ndiaye (yellow card) 90+9'	Stadium: Estadio Gran Canaria; Attendance: 21,610

15 December 2024 17	Real Sociedad	0–0	Las Palmas	San Sebastián
18:30 CET (UTC+1)	Kubo (yellow card) 39'; Barrenetxea (yellow card) 73'	Report	Mata (yellow card) 57'; Sandro (yellow card) 74'; Benito (yellow card) 90+1'	Stadium: Reale Arena; Attendance: 30.775; Referee: Mario Melero López

22 December 2024 18	Las Palmas	1–0	Espanyol	Las Palmas
18:30	Fábio Silva (yellow card) 17'; Marvin Park (yellow card) 30'; Álex Suárez (yellow card) 59'; Sandro 67'; Loiodice (yellow card) 80'	Report	Puado (yellow card) 19'; Lozano (yellow card) 83'	Stadium: Estadio Gran Canaria; Attendance: 23,743; Referee: César Soto Grado

12 January 2025 19	Las Palmas	1–2	Getafe	Las Palmas
14:00	Essugo (yellow card) 46'; Álex Suárez (yellow card) 82'; Januzaj 88'	Report	Arambarri (yellow card) 16'; Milla (yellow card) 64'; Coba 70', (yellow card) 82'; Mayoral 86'	Stadium: Estadio Gran Canaria; Attendance: 23,698; Referee: Javier Alberola Rojas

19 January 2025 20	Real Madrid	4–1	Las Palmas	Madrid
16:15 UTC+1	Mbappé 18' (pen.), 36'; Brahim 33'; Rodrygo 57'	Report	Silva 1'; Sandro (yellow card) 45+3'; Benito (red card) 64'	Stadium: Santiago Bernabéu; Attendance: 74,808; Referee: Alejandro Quintero González

26 January 2025 21	Las Palmas	1–1	Osasuna	Las Palmas
21:00	Fuster (yellow card) 11'; Essugo (yellow card) 30' (yellow-red card) 72'; Silva (yellow card) 69'; Álex Suárez (yellow card) 72'; Pelmard (yellow card) 88'; Januzaj 90+8', (yellow card) 90+10'	Report	Barja (yellow card) 19'; Areso (yellow card) 23'; Catena (yellow card) 24'; Oroz 53'; Moncayola (yellow card) 58'; Boyomo (yellow card) 77'; García (yellow card) 82'; Herrando (yellow card) 90+1'	Stadium: Estadio Gran Canaria; Attendance: 19,762; Referee: Jesús Gil Manzano

3 February 2025 22	Girona	2–1	Las Palmas	Girona
21:00 CET (UTC+1)	Ruiz 8', (penalty missed) 45+1'; Van de Beek (yellow card) 42'; Asprilla 79'; Solís (yellow card) 81'	Report	McKenna (yellow card) 45'; Silva 82'	Stadium: Montilivi; Attendance: 10,088; Referee: Mario Melero López

9 February 2025 23	Las Palmas	1–2	Villarreal	Las Palmas
18:30	Mármol (yellow card) 37'; Sandro (yellow card) 40'; McKenna (yellow card) 55'; Fuster 84'; Suárez (yellow card) 87'; Muñoz (yellow card) 90+9'; Moleiro (yellow card) 90+10'	Report	Marcelino (yellow card) 12'; Cardona (yellow card) 33'; Santi CV (yellow card) 38'; Baena 53'; Ayoze Pérez 66', (yellow card) 90'	Stadium: Estadio Gran Canaria; Attendance: 22.909; Referee: Francisco José Hernández Maeso

16 February 2025 24	Mallorca	3–1	Las Palmas	Palma
18:30 CET (UTC+1)	Muriqi 7', 28'; Rodríguez 35'; Larin (yellow card) 83'	Report	Loiodice (yellow card) 25'; Mármol (yellow card) 44'; Viti (yellow card) 45+1'; Bajčetić 62'; McKenna (yellow card) 90+6'	Stadium: Estadi Mallorca Son Moix; Attendance: 18,475; Referee: Miguel Ángel Ortiz Arias

23 February 2025 25	Las Palmas	0–2	Barcelona	Las Palmas
21:00	Suárez (yellow card) 80'	Report	Olmo 62'; De Jong (yellow card) 82'; Torres 90+5'	Stadium: Estadio Gran Canaria; Attendance: 30,746; Referee: Adrián Cordero Vega

28 February 2025 26	Real Valladolid	1–1	Las Palmas	Valladolid
21:00 CET (UTC+1)	Nikitscher (yellow card) 50'; Latasa 63'; Martín (yellow card) 70'	Report	Sandro 22'; McKenna (red card) 29'; Moleiro (yellow card) 45+6'	Stadium: José Zorrilla; Attendance: 15.643; Referee: De Burgos Bengoetxea

9 March 2025 27	Real Betis	1–0	Las Palmas	Seville
18:30 CET (UTC+1)	Llorente (yellow card) 19', (goal) 65'; Cardoso (yellow card) 80'; Isco (penalty missed) 90+5	Report	Viti (yellow card) 30'; Álex (yellow card) 38'; Bajčetić (yellow card) 39'; Essugo (yellow card) 53' (yellow-red card) 61'; Mata (yellow card) 64'; Javi (yellow card) 67'; Herzog (yellow card) 90+1'	Stadium: Benito Villamarín; Attendance: 49.292; Referee: José Sánchez Martínez

14 March 2025 28	Las Palmas	2–2	Alavés	Las Palmas
21:00	Muñoz (yellow card) 5'; Sandro (yellow card) 49'; Silva 90' (pen.); D.Martínez (yellow card) 90'; Januzaj (yellow card) 90+3'; Moleiro 90+5'; Suarez (yellow card) 90+7'; Fuster (yellow card) 90+10'	Report	Jordan (yellow card) 4'; Martínez (yellow card) 7', (goal) 45+1'; Guridi 63'; Tenaglia (yellow card) 80'; E.Coudet (yellow card) 90'; Villalibre (yellow card) 90+9'	Stadium: Estadio Gran Canaria; Attendance: 17.566; Referee: Mario Melero López

31 March 2025 29	Celta Vigo	1–1	Las Palmas	Vigo
21:00	Alfon 45+2'; Losada (yellow card) 45+5'; Javi (yellow card) 79'; Fer López (yellow card) 83'	Report	Moleiro 48'	Stadium: Balaídos; Attendance: 18.549; Referee: Juan Martínez Munuera

6 April 2025 30	Las Palmas	1–3	Real Sociedad	Las Palmas
14:00	McBurnie 60'	Report	Oyarzabal 5'; López (yellow card) 45+2'; Gómez 56'; Aramburu 68'; Martín (yellow card) 76'	Stadium: Estadio Gran Canaria; Attendance: 22.616; Referee: Miguel Ángel Ortiz Arias

12 April 2025 31	Getafe	1–3	Las Palmas	Getafe
16:15	Alderete 19'; Rico (red card) 33'	Report	Bajčetić (yellow card) 48'; Silva 53', 74'; McBurnie 61'; Mata (yellow card) 85'	Stadium: Coliseum; Attendance: 8.370; Referee: Javier Alberola Rojas

20 April 2025 32	Las Palmas	1–0	Atlético Madrid	Las Palmas
21:00	Javi Muñoz (yellow card) 71', (goal) 90+3'; Essugo (yellow card) 77'; Mata (yellow card) 90+4'	Report	Galán (yellow card) 54'	Stadium: Estadio Gran Canaria; Attendance: 27.154; Referee: Víctor García Verdura

23 April 2025 33	Bilbao	1–0	Las Palmas	Bilbao
19:00	I.Williams 5'; Yuri (yellow card) 11'	Report	Bajčetić (yellow card) 27'; McBurnie (yellow card) 53'; Suárez (yellow card) 76'	Stadium: San Mamés; Attendance: 47.724; Referee: Isidro Díaz de Mera

4 May 2025 34	Las Palmas	2–3	Valencia	Las Palmas

9 May 2025 35	Las Palmas	0–1	Rayo Vallecano	Las Palmas

13 May 2025 36	Sevilla	1–0	Las Palmas	Seville

18 May 2025 37	Las Palmas	0–1	Leganés	Las Palmas

24 May 2025 38	Espanyol	2–0	Las Palmas	Cornellà de Llobregat

=== Copa del Rey ===
31 October 2024 First round	Ontiñena CF	0–7	Las Palmas	Monzón
21:00 UTC+1	Bah (yellow card) 38'; Llobet (penalty missed) 90+4	Report	Mata 18', 68', 85', 88'; Cardona 74'; Herzog 78'; Fuster 89'	Stadium: Estadio Isidro Calderón; Attendance: 2.000; Referee: Víctor García Verdura

3 December 2024 Second round	Europa	1–2	Las Palmas	Barcelona
21:15	Lozano (yellow card) 34'; Flere (yellow card) 41'; Mahicas 55'; Escoruela (yellow card) 66'	Report	Campaña (yellow card) 34'; Fabio (yellow card) 41'; McBurnie 48', 75'; Mika (yellow card) 66'	Stadium: Nou Sardenya; Attendance: 4.018; Referee: Mario Melero López

5 January 2025 Round of 32	Elche	4–0	Las Palmas	Elche
12:00	Febas (yellow card) 12'; R. Mendoza 45'; José Salinas (yellow card) 51', (goal) 60'; Affengruber 56'; Bigas (yellow card) 65'; Nico González 71'; Raúl Guti (yellow card) 90+3'	Report	Marvin Park (yellow card) 55'	Stadium: Martínez Valero; Attendance: 18,302; Referee: José Luis Munuera Montero
