= List of Spanish football transfers summer 2024 =

This is a list of Spanish football transfers in the summer transfer window 2024 by club. Only transfers of the La Liga is included.

== La Liga ==
Note: Flags indicate national team as has been defined under FIFA eligibility rules. Players may hold more than one non-FIFA nationality.

=== Real Madrid ===
In:

No.	Pos.	Nation	Player
9	FW	FRA	Kylian Mbappé (from (France) Paris Saint-Germain)
14	FW	ESP	Joselu (from Espanyol)
16	FW	BRA	Endrick (from (Brazil) Palmeiras)

Out:

No.	Pos.	Nation	Player
6	DF	ESP	Nacho (to (Saudi Arabia) Al Qadsiah)
8	MF	GER	Toni Kroos (retired)
14	FW	ESP	Joselu (to (Qatar) Al-Gharafa)
25	GK	ESP	Kepa Arrizabalaga (loan return to (England) Chelsea, later on loan to (England) Bournemouth)
—	DF	ESP	Rafa Marín (to (Italy) Napoli, previously on loan at Alavés)
—	MF	ESP	Marvin Park (to Las Palmas, previously on loan)
—	FW	ESP	Juanmi Latasa (to Real Valladolid, previously on loan at Getafe)
—	MF	ESP	Mario Martín (on loan to Real Valladolid)
—	FW	URU	Álvaro Rodríguez (on loan to Getafe)

=== Barcelona ===
In:

No.	Pos.	Nation	Player
18	FW	ESP	Pau Víctor (from Girona)
20	MF	ESP	Dani Olmo (from (Germany) RB Leipzig)

Out:

No.	Pos.	Nation	Player
2	DF	POR	João Cancelo (loan return to (England) Manchester City, later to (Saudi Arabia) Al Hilal)
14	FW	POR	João Félix (loan return to Atlético Madrid, later to (England) Chelsea)
17	DF	ESP	Marcos Alonso (to Celta Vigo)
18	MF	ESP	Oriol Romeu (on loan to Girona)
19	FW	BRA	Vitor Roque (on loan to Real Betis)
20	DF	ESP	Sergi Roberto (to (Italy) Como)
22	MF	GER	İlkay Gündoğan (to (England) Manchester City)
38	FW	ESP	Marc Guiu (to (England) Chelsea)
41	DF	SEN	Mikayil Faye (to (France) Rennes)
—	DF	USA	Sergiño Dest (to (Netherlands) PSV, previously on loan)
—	DF	MEX	Julián Araujo (to (England) Bournemouth, previously on loan at Las Palmas)
—	DF	FRA	Clément Lenglet (on loan to Atlético Madrid, previously on loan at (England) Aston Villa)
—	DF	ESP	Álex Valle (on loan to (Scotland) Celtic, previously on loan at Levante)
—	DF	MAR	Chadi Riad (to Real Betis, previously on loan)

=== Girona ===
In:

No.	Pos.	Nation	Player
6	MF	NED	Donny van de Beek (from (England) Manchester United)
9	FW	ESP	Abel Ruiz (from (Portugal) Braga)
10	MF	COL	Yáser Asprilla (from (England) Watford)
11	FW	NED	Arnaut Danjuma (on loan from Villarreal)
14	MF	ESP	Oriol Romeu (on loan from Barcelona)
16	DF	ESP	Alejandro Francés (from Real Zaragoza)
18	DF	CZE	Ladislav Krejčí (from (Czech Republic) Sparta Prague)
19	FW	MKD	Bojan Miovski (from (Scotland) Aberdeen)
20	FW	ESP	Bryan Gil (on loan from (England) Tottenham Hotspur)
25	GK	ESP	Pau López (on loan from (France) Marseille)
27	MF	NED	Gabriel Misehouy (from (Netherlands) Ajax U21)

Out:

No.	Pos.	Nation	Player
9	FW	UKR	Artem Dovbyk (to (Italy) Roma)
10	MF	ESP	Borja García (released)
11	DF	ESP	Valery Fernández (on loan to Girona)
14	MF	ESP	Aleix García (to (Germany) Bayer Leverkusen)
16	MF	BRA	Savinho (loan return to (France) Troyes, later to (England) Manchester City)
19	MF	ESP	Toni Villa (to Eibar)
20	DF	BRA	Yan Couto (loan return to (England) Manchester City, later on loan to (Germany) Borussia Dortmund)
26	GK	ESP	Toni Fuidias (on loan to Cartagena)
—	MF	MLI	Ibrahima Kébé (on loan to (Belgium) Lommel, previously on loan at Mirandés)
—	FW	ESP	Pau Víctor (to Barcelona, previously on loan at Barcelona B)
—	DF	PER	Alexander Callens (to (Greece) AEK Athens, previously on loan)
—	FW	ESP	Gabri Martínez (to (Portugal) Braga, previously on loan at Mirandés)
—	MF	ESP	Álex Sala (to Córdoba, previously on loan)
—	FW	ESP	Arnau Ortiz (to (Poland) Śląsk Wrocław, previously on loan at Cartagena)
—	FW	ESP	Manu Vallejo (to Racing Ferrol, previously on loan at Zaragoza)
—	FW	MAR	Ilyas Chaira (on loan to Real Oviedo, previously on loan at Mirandés)

=== Atlético Madrid ===
In:

No.	Pos.	Nation	Player
1	GK	ARG	Juan Musso (on loan from (Italy) Atalanta)
4	MF	ENG	Conor Gallagher (from (England) Chelsea)
9	FW	NOR	Alexander Sørloth (from Villarreal)
15	DF	FRA	Clément Lenglet (on loan from Barcelona)
19	FW	ARG	Julián Álvarez (from (England) Manchester City)
24	DF	ESP	Robin Le Normand (from Real Sociedad)

Out:

No.	Pos.	Nation	Player
1	GK	ROU	Horațiu Moldovan (on loan to (Italy) Sassuolo)
4	DF	BRA	Gabriel Paulista (to (Turkey) Beşiktaş)
8	MF	ESP	Saúl (on loan to Sevilla)
9	FW	NED	Memphis Depay (released)
15	DF	MNE	Stefan Savić (to (Turkey) Trabzonspor)
18	MF	BEL	Arthur Vermeeren (on loan to (Germany) RB Leipzig)
19	FW	ESP	Álvaro Morata (to (Italy) Milan)
22	DF	ESP	Mario Hermoso (released)
—	DF	TUR	Çağlar Söyüncü (to (Turkey) Fenerbahçe, previously on loan)
—	MF	ESP	Vitolo (released)
—	FW	ESP	Carlos Martín (on loan to Alavés, previously on loan at Mirandes)
—	FW	POR	João Félix (to (England) Chelsea, previously on loan at Barcelona)
—	FW	ESP	Samu Omorodion (to (Portugal) Porto, previously on loan at Alavés)
—	DF	URU	Santiago Mouriño (to Alavés, previously on loan at Zaragoza)
—	FW	POR	Marcos Paulo (on loan to (Belgium) RWDM)
—	FW	ESP	Germán Valera (to Valencia, previously on loan at Zaragoza)

=== Athletic Bilbao ===
In:

No.	Pos.	Nation	Player
2	DF	ESP	Andoni Gorosabel (from Alavés)
11	MF	ESP	Álvaro Djaló (from (Portugal) Braga)
25	DF	ESP	Unai Núñez (on loan from Celta Vigo)

Out:

No.	Pos.	Nation	Player
10	MF	ESP	Iker Muniain (released)
14	MF	ESP	Dani García (to (Greece) Olympiacos)
19	DF	ESP	Imanol García de Albéniz (to (Czech Republic) Sparta Prague)
20	FW	ESP	Asier Villalibre (to Alavés)
22	MF	ESP	Raúl García (retired)
—	MF	ESP	Jon Morcillo (to Albacete, previously on loan at Amorebieta)
—	MF	ESP	Unai Vencedor (to Racing Santander, previously on loan at Eibar)
—	MF	ESP	Juan Artola (to Cultural Leonesa, previously on loan at Alcorcón)
—	DF	ESP	Unai Núñez (to Celta Vigo, previously on loan)

=== Real Sociedad ===
In:

No.	Pos.	Nation	Player
9	FW	ISL	Orri Óskarsson (from (Denmark) Copenhagen)
12	DF	ESP	Javi López (from Alavés)
17	DF	ESP	Sergio Gómez (from (England) Manchester City)
21	DF	MAR	Nayef Aguerd (on loan from (England) West Ham United)
24	MF	CRO	Luka Sučić (from (Austria) RB Salzburg)

Out:

No.	Pos.	Nation	Player
8	MF	ESP	Mikel Merino (to (England) Arsenal)
9	FW	ESP	Carlos Fernández (on loan to Cádiz)
24	DF	ESP	Robin Le Normand (to Atletico Madrid)
—	FW	ESP	Roberto López (to Leganés, previously on loan at Tenerife)
—	MF	ESP	Álex Sola (to Getafe, previously on loan at Alavés)
—	DF	ESP	Diego Rico (to Getafe, previously on loan)
—	FW	ESP	Martín Merquelanz (to Eibar)
—	FW	ESP	Jon Karrikaburu (on loan to Racing Santander, previously on loan at Andorra)
—	MF	ESP	Robert Navarro (to Mallorca, previously on loan at Cádiz)

=== Real Betis ===
In:

No.	Pos.	Nation	Player
3	DF	ESP	Diego Llorente (from (England) Leeds United)
6	DF	BRA	Natan (on loan from (Italy) Napoli)
8	FW	BRA	Vitor Roque (on loan from Barcelona)
12	DF	SUI	Ricardo Rodriguez (from (Italy) Torino)
13	GK	ESP	Adrián (from (England) Liverpool)
15	DF	FRA	Romain Perraud (from (England) Southampton)
19	MF	ESP	Iker Losada (from Racing de Ferrol)
20	MF	ARG	Giovani Lo Celso (from (England) Tottenham Hotspur)
21	MF	ESP	Marc Roca (from (England) Leeds United, previously on loan)
28	DF	MAR	Chadi Riad (from Barcelona, previously on loan)

Out:

No.	Pos.	Nation	Player
1	GK	CHI	Claudio Bravo (retired)
3	DF	ESP	Juan Miranda (to (Italy) Bologna)
5	MF	ARG	Guido Rodríguez (to (England) West Ham United)
6	DF	ARG	Germán Pezzella (to (Argentina) River Plate)
8	MF	FRA	Nabil Fekir (to (United Arab Emirates) Al Jazira)
10	FW	ESP	Ayoze Pérez (to Villarreal)
12	FW	BRA	Willian José (to (Russia) Spartak Moscow)
19	DF	GRE	Sokratis Papastathopoulos (retired)
20	DF	BRA	Abner (to (France) Lyon)
28	DF	MAR	Chadi Riad (to (England) Crystal Palace)
—	MF	ESP	Rober González (to (Netherlands) NEC Nijmegen, previously on loan)
—	MF	ESP	Juan Cruz (to Leganés, previously on loan)
—	FW	ESP	Borja Iglesias (on loan to Celta Vigo, previously on loan at (Germany) Bayer Leverkusen)
—	MF	ESP	Álex Collado (on loan to (Saudi Arabia) Al-Kholood, previously on loan at (Saudi Arabia) Al-Okhdood)

=== Villarreal ===
In:

No.	Pos.	Nation	Player
1	GK	BRA	Luiz Júnior (from (Portugal) Famalicão)
2	DF	CPV	Logan Costa (from (France) Toulouse)
5	DF	COD	Willy Kambwala (from (England) Manchester United)
13	GK	ESP	Diego Conde (from Leganés)
15	FW	FRA	Thierno Barry (from (Switzerland) Basel)
18	MF	SEN	Pape Gueye (from (France) Marseille)
19	FW	CIV	Nicolas Pépé (from (Turkey) Trabzonspor)
22	FW	ESP	Ayoze Pérez (from Real Betis)
23	DF	ESP	Sergi Cardona (from Las Palmas)

Out:

No.	Pos.	Nation	Player
1	GK	ESP	Pepe Reina (to (Italy) Como)
5	DF	ESP	Jorge Cuenca (to (England) Fulham)
6	MF	FRA	Étienne Capoue (released)
11	FW	NOR	Alexander Sørloth (to Atlético Madrid)
13	GK	DEN	Filip Jörgensen (to (England) Chelsea)
14	MF	ESP	Manu Trigueros (to Granada)
15	FW	ESP	José Luis Morales (to Levante)
18	DF	ESP	Alberto Moreno (to (Italy) Como)
19	MF	FRA	Francis Coquelin (released)
23	DF	ALG	Aïssa Mandi (to (France) Lille)
25	MF	BFA	Bertrand Traoré (to (Netherlands) Ajax)
26	DF	ESP	Adrià Altimira (on loan to Leganés)
30	FW	ESP	Jorge Pascual (on loan to Eibar)
37	DF	ESP	Carlos Romero (on loan to Espanyol)
—	DF	COL	Johan Mojica (to Mallorca, previously on loan at Osasuna)
—	FW	CHI	Ben Brereton Díaz (to (England) Southampton, previously on loan at (England) Sheffield United)
—	FW	URU	Andrés Ferrari (on loan to (Belgium) Sint-Truiden)
—	FW	NED	Arnaut Danjuma (on loan to Girona, previously on loan at (England) Everton)

=== Valencia ===
In:

No.	Pos.	Nation	Player
2	DF	BEL	Maximiliano Caufriez (on loan from (France) Clermont)
5	MF	ARG	Enzo Barrenechea (on loan from (England) Aston Villa)
11	FW	ESP	Rafa Mir (on loan from Sevilla)
13	GK	MKD	Stole Dimitrievski (from Rayo Vallecano)
17	FW	ESP	Dani Gómez (on loan from Levante)
22	MF	ESP	Luis Rioja (from Alavés)
25	GK	GEO	Giorgi Mamardashvili (on loan from (England) Liverpool)
30	FW	ESP	Germán Valera (from Atlético Madrid)

Out:

No.	Pos.	Nation	Player
11	FW	DOM	Peter Federico (loan return to Real Madrid B, later to Getafe)
13	GK	ESP	Cristian Rivero (on loan to Albacete)
15	DF	TUR	Cenk Özkacar (on loan to Valladolid)
17	FW	UKR	Roman Yaremchuk (loan return to (Belgium) Club Brugge, later to (Greece) Olympiacos)
19	FW	ESP	Alberto Marí (on loan to Zaragoza)
25	GK	GEO	Giorgi Mamardashvili (to (England) Liverpool)
—	DF	SUI	Eray Cömert (on loan to Real Valladolid, previously on loan at (France) Nantes)

=== Alavés ===
In:

No.	Pos.	Nation	Player
3	DF	ESP	Manu Sánchez (on loan from Celta Vigo)
9	FW	ESP	Asier Villalibre (from Athletic Bilbao)
10	MF	ARG	Tomás Conechny (from (Argentina) Godoy Cruz)
11	FW	ESP	Toni Martínez (from (Portugal) Porto)
12	DF	URU	Santiago Mouriño (from Atlético Madrid)
15	FW	ESP	Carlos Martín (on loan from Atlético Madrid)
16	DF	ESP	Hugo Novoa (from (Germany) RB Leipzig)
19	FW	ESP	Stoichkov (from Eibar)
20	MF	ARG	Luka Romero (on loan from (Italy) AC Milan)
22	DF	MLI	Moussa Diarra (from (France) Toulouse)
25	MF	ESP	Joan Jordán (on loan from Sevilla)

Out:

No.	Pos.	Nation	Player
2	DF	ESP	Andoni Gorosabel (to Athletic Bilbao)
3	DF	ESP	Rubén Duarte (to (Mexico) Pumas UNAM)
7	MF	ESP	Álex Sola (loan return to Real Sociedad, later to Getafe)
11	MF	ESP	Luis Rioja (to Valencia)
16	DF	ESP	Rafa Marín (loan return to Real Madrid, later to (Italy) Napoli)
17	MF	ESP	Xeber Alkain (to Eibar)
27	DF	ESP	Javi López (to Real Sociedad)
32	FW	ESP	Samu Omorodion (loan return to Atlético Madrid, later to (Portugal) Porto)
42	DF	ESP	Unai Ropero (on loan to Eldense)
—	FW	ESP	Miguel de la Fuente (to Leganés, previously on loan)
—	MF	EQG	Álex Balboa (to (Netherlands) Almere City, previously on loan at Huesca)
—	FW	ESP	Alan Godoy (to Eldense, previously on loan at Gimnàstic)
—	DF	SRB	Nikola Maraš (on loan to Sporting Gijón, previously on loan at Levante)

=== Osasuna ===
In:

No.	Pos.	Nation	Player
19	MF	ESP	Bryan Zaragoza (on loan from (Germany) Bayern Munich)
22	DF	CMR	Enzo Boyomo (from Real Valladolid)
23	DF	ESP	Abel Bretones (from Oviedo)

Out:

No.	Pos.	Nation	Player
5	DF	ESP	David García (to (Qatar) Al-Rayyan)
22	DF	COL	Johan Mojica (loan return to Villarreal, later to Mallorca)

=== Getafe ===
In:

No.	Pos.	Nation	Player
1	GK	CZE	Jiří Letáček (from (Czech Republic) Baník Ostrava)
4	DF	ESP	Juan Berrocal (from Eibar)
6	MF	NGA	Christantus Uche (from Ceuta)
7	DF	ESP	Álex Sola (from Real Sociedad)
16	DF	ESP	Diego Rico (from Real Sociedad)
18	FW	URU	Álvaro Rodríguez (on loan from Real Madrid)
17	FW	ESP	Carles Pérez (on loan from Celta Vigo)
19	FW	DOM	Peter Federico (from Real Madrid B)
23	FW	TUR	Bertuğ Yıldırım (on loan from (France) Rennes)
24	FW	URU	Álvaro Rodríguez (on loan from Real Madrid)

Out:

No.	Pos.	Nation	Player
1	GK	BRA	Daniel Fuzato (loan return to Ibiza, later to Eibar)
4	DF	URU	Gastón Álvarez (to (Saudi Arabia) Al Qadsiah)
7	FW	ESP	Jaime Mata (to Las Palmas)
9	MF	ESP	Óscar Rodríguez (loan return to Sevilla, later to Leganés)
12	FW	ENG	Mason Greenwood (loan return to (England) Manchester United, later to (France) Marseille)
14	FW	ESP	Juanmi Latasa (loan return to Real Madrid. later to Real Valladolid)
20	MF	SRB	Nemanja Maksimović (to (Greece) Panathinaikos)
24	MF	GUI	Ilaix Moriba (loan return to (Germany) RB Leipzig, later on loan to Celta Vigo)
—	FW	TUR	Enes Ünal (to (England) Bournemouth, previously on loan)
—	FW	ESP	Darío Poveda (to (Portugal) Farense, previously on loan at Cartagena)
—	FW	HON	Choco Lozano (to (Mexico) Santos Laguna, previously on loan at Almería)
—	DF	ARG	Jonathan Silva (to (Cyprus) Pafos, previously on loan at Albacete)

=== Celta Vigo ===
In:

No.	Pos.	Nation	Player
4	DF	ESP	Unai Núñez (from Athletic Bilbao, previously on loan)
6	MF	GUI	Ilaix Moriba (on loan from (Germany) RB Leipzig)
7	FW	ESP	Borja Iglesias (on loan from Real Betis)
20	DF	ESP	Marcos Alonso (from Barcelona)

Out:

No.	Pos.	Nation	Player
4	DF	ESP	Unai Núñez (on loan to Athletic Bilbao)
5	MF	PER	Renato Tapia (to Leganés)
6	MF	ESP	Carlos Dotor (on loan to Real Oviedo)
7	FW	ESP	Carles Pérez (on loan to Getafe)
18	FW	NOR	Jørgen Strand Larsen (on loan to (England) Wolverhampton)
20	DF	ESP	Kevin Vázquez (to Sporting de Gijón)
23	DF	ESP	Manu Sánchez (on loan to Alavés)
24	FW	ESP	Miguel Rodríguez (on loan to (Netherlands) Utrecht)
—	DF	ESP	José Fontán (to (Portugal) Arouca, previously on loan at Cartagena)
—	MF	ESP	Miguel Baeza (to (Portugal) Nacional, previously on loan at Mirandés)
—	FW	ESP	Julen Lobete (to Málaga, previously on loan at Andorra)
—	FW	ESP	Lautaro de León (to Andorra, previously on loan at Mirandés)
—	FW	POR	Gonçalo Paciência (released, previously on loan at (Germany) VfL Bochum)

=== Sevilla ===
In:

No.	Pos.	Nation	Player
1	GK	ESP	Álvaro Fernández (from Huesca)
9	FW	NGA	Kelechi Iheanacho (from (England) Leicester City)
12	MF	BEL	Albert Sambi Lokonga (on loan from (England) Arsenal)
14	FW	ESP	Peque (from Racing Santander)
17	MF	ESP	Saúl (on loan from Atlético Madrid)
18	MF	FRA	Lucien Agoumé (from (Italy) Inter Milan, previously on loan)
19	DF	ARG	Valentín Barco (on loan from (England) Brighton)
21	MF	NGA	Chidera Ejuke (from (Russia) CSKA Moscow)

Out:

No.	Pos.	Nation	Player
1	GK	SRB	Marko Dmitrović (to Leganés)
4	DF	ESP	Sergio Ramos (released)
8	MF	ESP	Joan Jordán (on loan to Alavés)
9	FW	ESP	Rafa Mir (on loan to Valencia)
10	FW	ARG	Alejo Véliz (loan return to (England) Tottenham Hotspur, later on loan to Espanyol)
12	FW	DOM	Mariano Díaz (released)
15	FW	MAR	Youssef En-Nesyri (to (Turkey) Fenerbahçe)
17	FW	ARG	Erik Lamela (to (Greece) AEK Athens)
19	DF	ARG	Marcos Acuña (to (Argentina) River Plate)
21	MF	ESP	Óliver Torres (to (Mexico) Monterrey)
25	FW	BEL	Adnan Januzaj (on loan to Las Palmas)
46	MF	TUN	Hannibal Mejbri (loan return to (England) Manchester United, later to (England) Burnley)
—	DF	ARG	Federico Gattoni (on loan to (Argentina) River Plate, previously on loan at (Belgium) Anderlecht)
—	MF	DEN	Thomas Delaney (to (Denmark) Copenhagen, previously on loan at (Belgium) Anderlecht)
—	DF	SWE	Ludwig Augustinsson (to (Belgium) Anderlecht, previously on loan)
—	MF	ESP	Óscar Rodríguez (to Leganés, previously on loan at Getafe)

=== Mallorca ===
In:

No.	Pos.	Nation	Player
2	DF	ESP	Mateu Morey (from (Germany) Borussia Dortmund)
11	FW	JPN	Takuma Asano (from (Germany) VfL Bochum)
15	DF	ESP	Valery Fernández (on loan from Girona)
16	FW	POR	Chiquinho (on loan from (England) Wolverhampton)
20	MF	ESP	Robert Navarro (from Real Sociedad)
22	DF	COL	Johan Mojica (from Villarreal)

Out:

No.	Pos.	Nation	Player
1	GK	SRB	Predrag Rajković (to (Saudi Arabia) Al-Ittihad)
11	DF	ESP	Jaume Costa (to Albacete)
20	DF	URU	Giovanni González (to (Russia) Krasnodar)
—	FW	SEN	Amath Ndiaye (to Real Valladolid, previously on loan)
—	DF	ESP	Josep Gayá (to Tenerife, previously on loan at Amorebieta)
—	MF	GHA	Iddrisu Baba (to Almería, previously on loan)

=== Las Palmas ===
In:

No.	Pos.	Nation	Player
1	GK	NED	Jasper Cillessen (from (Netherlands) NEC Nijmegen)
2	MF	ESP	Marvin Park (from Real Madrid, previously on loan)
7	FW	POR	Fábio Silva (on loan from (England) Wolverhampton Wanderers)
13	GK	CRO	Dinko Horkaš (from (Bulgaria) Lokomotiv Plovdiv)
14	MF	ESP	Manu Fuster (from Albacete)
15	DF	SCO	Scott McKenna (from (England) Nottingham Forest)
16	FW	SCO	Oli McBurnie (from (England) Sheffield United)
17	FW	ESP	Jaime Mata (from Getafe)
18	DF	ESP	Viti Rozada (from Albacete)
21	FW	ESP	Iván Gil (from (Spain) FC Andorra)
26	MF	POR	Dário Essugo (on loan from (Portugal) Sporting CP)
27	FW	BEL	Adnan Januzaj (on loan from Sevilla)
—	FW	CMR	Iván Cédric (from Real Valladolid)

Out:

No.	Pos.	Nation	Player
1	DF	ESP	Aarón Escandell (to Real Oviedo)
3	DF	ESP	Sergi Cardona (to Villarreal)
6	DF	ESP	Eric Curbelo (to Sporting Gijón)
7	FW	ESP	Cristian Herrera (released)
14	DF	ESP	Álvaro Lemos (to Oviedo)
16	FW	GUI	Sory Kaba (on loan to Elche CF)
17	MF	MAR	Munir El Haddadi (released)
22	MF	COD	Omenuke Mfulu (released)
23	DF	EQG	Saúl Coco (to (Italy) Torino)
28	DF	MEX	Julián Araujo (loan return to Barcelona, later to (England) Bournemouth)
—	FW	CMR	Iván Cédric (on loan to Barcelona B)

=== Rayo Vallecano ===
In:

No.	Pos.	Nation	Player
4	MF	ESP	Pedro Díaz (from (France) Bordeaux)
10	MF	COL	James Rodríguez (from (Brazil) São Paulo)
13	GK	ARG	Augusto Batalla (on loan from (Argentina) River Plate)
15	MF	ESP	Gerard Gumbau (on loan from Granada)
21	FW	ESP	Adri Embarba (on loan from Almería)

Out:

No.	Pos.	Nation	Player
1	GK	MKD	Stole Dimitrievski (to Valencia)
6	MF	ESP	José Ángel Pozo (to (Cyprus) Karmiotissa)
9	FW	COL	Radamel Falcao (to (Colombia) Millonarios)
10	FW	CPV	Bebé (released)
15	MF	POR	Miguel Crespo (loan return to (Turkey) Fenerbahçe, later to (Turkey) İstanbul Başakşehir)
—	FW	ESP	Andrés Martín (to Racing Santander, previously on loan)
—	GK	ESP	Miguel Ángel Morro (on loan to (Portugal) Vizela, previously on loan at Villarreal B)

=== Leganés ===
In:

No.	Pos.	Nation	Player
1	GK	ESP	Juan Soriano (from Tenerife)
2	DF	ESP	Adrià Altimira (on loan from Villarreal)
4	DF	ECU	Jackson Porozo (on loan from (France) Troyes)
5	MF	PER	Renato Tapia (from Celta Vigo)
7	MF	ESP	Óscar Rodríguez (from Sevilla)
9	FW	ESP	Miguel de la Fuente (from Alavés, previously on loan)
11	MF	ESP	Juan Cruz (from Real Betis, previously on loan)
12	DF	FRA	Valentin Rosier (from (Turkey) Beşiktaş)
13	GK	SRB	Marko Dmitrović (from Sevilla)
15	DF	ESP	Enric Franquesa (from Levante)
18	FW	CIV	Sébastien Haller (on loan from (Germany) Borussia Dortmund)
21	FW	ESP	Roberto López (from Real Sociedad)

Out:

No.	Pos.	Nation	Player
1	GK	ESP	Dani Jiménez (to Huesca)
4	DF	CAN	Diyaeddine Abzi (loan return to (France) Pau FC, later released)
8	MF	ESP	Luis Perea (to Racing Ferrol)
13	GK	ESP	Diego Conde (to Villarreal)
20	MF	ESP	Iker Undabarrena (to (Malaysia) Johor Darul Ta'zim)
21	DF	ESP	Jorge Miramón (to (Cyprus) AEK Larnaca)
22	DF	ESP	Aritz Arambarri (to Eibar)
—	FW	ESP	Sergio Navarro (to Alcorcón, previously on loan at Rayo Majadahonda)

=== Valladolid ===
In:

No.	Pos.	Nation	Player
1	GK	POR	André Ferreira (from Granada, previously on loan)
4	MF	ESP	Víctor Meseguer (from Granada, previously on loan)
6	DF	TUR	Cenk Özkacar (on loan from Valencia)
11	FW	ESP	Raúl Moro (from (Italy) Lazio, previously on loan)
12	MF	ESP	Mario Martín (on loan from Real Madrid)
13	GK	EST	Karl Hein (on loan from (England) Arsenal)
14	FW	ESP	Juanmi Latasa (from Real Madrid)
15	DF	SUI	Eray Cömert (on loan from Valencia)
17	FW	CRO	Stipe Biuk (from (United States) Los Angeles FC, previously on loan)
19	FW	SEN	Amath Ndiaye (from Mallorca, previously on loan)
20	FW	CRO	Stanko Jurić (from (Italy) Parma, previously on loan)

Out:

No.	Pos.	Nation	Player
1	GK	ESP	Jordi Masip (released)
6	DF	CMR	Enzo Boyomo (to Osasuna)
17	FW	CRO	Stipe Biuk (on loan to (Croatia) Hadjuk Split)
18	DF	ESP	Sergio Escudero (to Deportivo La Coruña)
35	FW	CMR	Iván Cédric (to Las Palmas)

=== Espanyol ===
In:

No.	Pos.	Nation	Player
4	DF	ALB	Marash Kumbulla (on loan from (Italy) Roma)
9	FW	ARG	Alejo Véliz (on loan from (England) Tottenham Hotspur)
12	DF	ESP	Álvaro Tejero (from Eibar)
16	FW	MAR	Walid Cheddira (on loan from (Italy) Napoli)
20	MF	CZE	Alex Král (on loan from (Germany) 1. FC Union Berlin)
22	DF	ESP	Carlos Romero (on loan from Villarreal)
24	FW	FRA	Irvin Cardona (on loan from (Germany) FC Augsburg)
37	FW	TUR	Naci Ünüvar (on loan from (Netherlands) Ajax)

Out:

No.	Pos.	Nation	Player
2	DF	ESP	Óscar Gil (to (Belgium) OH Leuven)
4	DF	ESP	Víctor Ruiz (released)
8	MF	ALB	Keidi Bare (to Real Zaragoza)
9	FW	SEN	Keita Baldé (loan return to (Russia) Spartak Moscow, later to (Turkey) Sivasspor)
16	MF	ESP	José Carlos Lazo (to Albacete)
21	MF	ESP	Nico Melamed (to Almería)
22	FW	DEN	Martin Braithwaite (to (Brazil) Grêmio)
—	FW	ESP	Joselu (to Real Madrid, previously on loan)
—	DF	ESP	Rubén Sánchez (on loan to Granada, previously on loan at Mirandés)

== See also ==
- 2024–25 La Liga
