= 2023–24 UD Las Palmas season =

75th season in existence of UD Las Palmas

Las Palmas
2023–24 season
- President: Miguel Ángel Ramírez
- Head coach: García Pimienta
- Stadium: Estadio Gran Canaria
- La Liga: 16th
- Copa del Rey: Round of 32
- Top goalscorer: League: Kirian Rodríguez (6); All: Kirian Rodríguez (6)
- Highest home attendance: 32,037 vs Real Madrid (27 January 2024)
- Lowest home attendance: 18,734 vs Girona (27 April 2024)
- Average home league attendance: 25,152
- Biggest win: 3–0 vs Manacor (31 October 2023); 3–0 vs Villarreal (13 January 2024)
- Biggest defeat: 0–5 vs Atlético Madrid (17 February 2024)
Home colours	Away colours	Third colours

The 2023–24 Unión Deportiva Las Palmas season was the club's 75th season in existence and their first season in La Liga since the 2017–18 season, following promotion from the Segunda División in their previous campaign. In addition to the domestic league, Las Palmas participated in this season's edition of the Copa del Rey. The season covers the period from 1 July 2023 until 30 June 2024.

== Kits ==
- Supplier: Hummel
- Sponsors: Gran Canaria (front)

Home (Note: The inaugural shirt's design honors beach sands, weaving varied shades into the fabric. The fluid wave pattern evokes Maspalomas' dunes, anchoring this partnership within Gran Canaria's essence. Notably, the neckline displays vibrant yellow and blue accents.)	Away (Note: The second kit features Gran Canaria's map – a tribute to its origin. Striking yellow accents contrast the anthracite base, connecting with the primary kit; the chevrons on the shoulders and pants symbolise the club's spirit and progress.)	Third (Note: The third kit features the emblems of founding teams Arenas Club and Atlético Club and prominently showcases red stripes in two shades along with white. The kit pays homage to Gran Canaria's history, evoking the 1940s banana cultivation era in the northwest region of the island.)

== Season overview ==
=== Pre-season ===
On 10 June 2023, Las Palmas announced that the pre-season would start with the players' medical examinations on 6 July before training commenced on 10 July in Ciudad Deportiva, Las Palmas.

=== August ===
On 12 August, Las Palmas played their first La Liga game since the 2017–18 season, being held 1–1 against Mallorca in their opening league match at Estadio Gran Canaria. Jonathan Viera scored the first goal for the club as he opened the score from a penalty before Antonio Raíllo equalised for Mallorca in the second half. On 17 August, Las Palmas announced the signing of Sory Kaba for an initial fee of €1,500,000 with additional payments of another €1,500,000 to be paid to FC Midtjylland. The following day, Las Palmas announced the signing of returning loanee Marvin Park, on loan from Real Madrid; the club refused to pay a reported fee of €2,000,000 to make the signing permanent so instead agreed on a loan signing with an option to buy.

On the same day, Las Palmas fell to defeat in their second league match against Valencia after a 1–0 loss at the Mestalla. Both Mármol and Araujo played their first competitive match for the club. On 23 August, Las Palmas announced the signing of Máximo Perrone on a year-loan from Manchester City. Perrone replaced Fabio González's place as the number 8 for the squad due to González's injury with the right ankle.

On 25 August, Las Palmas played their second home match of the season in a goalless draw against Real Sociedad with Enzo Loiodice hitting the crossbar twice during the game. Kaba made his competitive debut whilst Araujo made his starting debut for the club. Prior to the match, Las Palmas gave a 1-minute silence in respects for former president José de Aguilar after his passing on 24 August 2023. de Aguilar was president of Las Palmas in 1983, having been a board member since 1968, and served two terms for the club.

=== September ===
On 2 September 2023, Las Palmas suffered a 1–0 defeat to Girona at Montilivi. Perrone made his competitive debut on the day. On 8 September 2023, Las Palmas played a friendly match against Atlético Paso during international break. Las Palmas lost 1–0 to the La Palma side by full-time. On 17 September 2023, Las Palmas fell to a second consecutive loss to Sevilla after succumbing to a 1–0 result at the Ramón Sánchez Pizjuán Stadium. On 24 September 2023, Las Palmas got their first win of the season, winning 1–0 against Granada with the winner coming from Kirian Rodríguez in the 92nd minute of the match. Cristian Herrera made his debut for the club while Mika Mármol was sent off in the second half after accumulating two yellow cards. On 27 September 2023, Las Palmas fell to a 2–0 defeat against Real Madrid at the Santiago Bernabéu. Eric Curbelo made his First Division debut for the club, and Daley Sinkgraven returned to the starting line-up from injury.

=== October ===
On 2 October 2023, Las Palmas completed a late comeback in a 2–1 victory over Celta Vigo. Jonathan Viera equalised from the penalty spot, cancelling out Anastasios Douvikas's 66th-minute goal, before Marc Cardona scored the winner, and his first league goal, in the 7th minute of additional time, giving Las Palmas the lead before full-time. On 8 October 2023, Las Palmas won their first away match of La Liga after a 2–1 victory against Villarreal. A goal each from set pieces by Saúl Coco and Marc Cardona, who scored in his second consecutive game, earned the win for Las Palmas. Going into international break, Saúl Coco was called up to the Equatorial Guinea national team for a friendly on 13 October 2023. On 17 October 2023, manager García Pimienta extended his contract with Las Palmas until June 2025.

On 22 October 2023, Las Palmas fell to their first defeat at home after losing 1–0 to Rayo Vallecano, following a late penalty goal by Bebé. On 28 October 2023, Las Palmas won 2–1 away against Almería. Munir El Haddadi opened the score, assisted by Marvin Park, before Sory Kaba scored the winning goal in additional time. On 31 October 2023, Las Palmas progressed through to the second round of the Copa del Rey after a 3–0 win against Manacor. Aarón Escandell made his debut while Julián Araujo, Alberto Moleiro and Pau Ferrer scored a goal each to seal the match.

=== November ===
On 3 November 2023, Las Palmas defeated Atlético Madrid in a 2–1 upset in front of a crowd of 30,080 fans. Both Kirian Rodríguez and Benito Ramírez scored a goal each. It was the first time Las Palmas had defeated Atleti since January 1987 with the same scoreline.

== Management team ==
Position	Name
Head coach	(Spain) García Pimienta
Assistant coach	(Spain) Álex García
Fitness coach	(Spain) David Gómez
Goalkeeping coach	(Spain) José Yepes
Technical assistant	(Spain) Momo

- Last updated: 6 August 2023

== Players ==
=== First team ===
N	Pos.	Nat.	Name	Age	EU	Since	App	Goals	Ends	Transfer fee	Notes
Goalkeepers
1	GK	(Spain)	Aarón Escandell	31	EU	2023	0	0	2025	€400,000	
13	GK	(Spain)	Álvaro Valles	29	EU	2019	97	0	2024	Free	
Defenders
2	DF	(Spain)	Marvin Park	26	EU	2023	24	1	2024	Loan	
3	DF	(Spain)	Sergi Cardona	27	EU	2021	79	0	2024	Free	
4	DF	(Spain)	Álex Suárez	33	EU	2016	92	2	2024	Free	
6	DF	(Spain)	Eric Curbelo	32	EU	2019	152	5	2024	Free (Note: Curbelo was released by SD Leioa on 22 December 2015, before joining Las Palmas on a free transfer six days later.)	
14	DF	(Spain)	Álvaro Lemos	33	EU	2018	149	7	2025	Free	
15	DF	(Spain)	Mika Mármol	25	EU	2023	0	0	2026	€2M	
18	DF	(Netherlands)	Daley Sinkgraven	31	EU	2023	0	0	2025	Free	
23	DF	(Equatorial Guinea)	Saúl Coco	27	EU	2019	43	1	2025	Free	
28	DF	(Mexico)	Julián Araujo	25	Non-EU	2023	0	0	2024	Loan	
Midfielders
5	MF	(Spain)	Javi Muñoz	31	EU	2023	0	0	2025	Free	
8	MF	(Argentina)	Máximo Perrone	23	Non-EU	2023	0	0	2024	Loan	
10	MF	(Spain)	Alberto Moleiro	23	EU	2021	77	3	2026	Youth system	
12	MF	(France)	Enzo Loiodice	25	EU	2020	78	6	2025	Undisclosed (Note: Prior to his signing, Loiodice was under contract at Dijon until June 2021.)	
20	MF	(Spain)	Kirian Rodríguez	31	EU	2019	100	6	2026	Youth system	
21	MF	(Spain)	Jonathan Viera (captain)	37	EU	2021	248	75	2025	Free	
22	MF	(Democratic Republic of the Congo)	Omenuke Mfulu (vice captain)	32	EU	2021	60	0	2025	Free	
Forwards
7	FW	(Spain)	Cristian Herrera	35	EU	2023	0	0	2024	Free	
9	FW	(Spain)	Sandro Ramírez	31	EU	2023	21	7	2026	€1.5M	
11	FW	(Spain)	Benito Ramírez (4th captain)	31	EU	2018	111	6	2025	Youth system	
16	FW	(Guinea)	Sory Kaba	31	EU	2023	0	0	2027	€3M	
17	FW	(Morocco)	Munir El Haddadi	31	EU	2023	0	0	2024	Free	
19	FW	(Spain)	Marc Cardona	31	EU	2022	36	7	2026	Free (Note: Cardona was released by Osasuna, before signing with Las Palmas on 7 July 2022.)	
24	FW	(Spain)	Pejiño	30	EU	2020	70	15	2026	Free (Note: Pejiño was released by Sevilla on 23 June 2020, before signing for Las Palmas in August.)	
Unregistered players
–	MF	(Spain)	Fabio González (3rd captain)	29	EU	2017	111	0	2025	Youth System	(Note: Fabio was left out of the final squad after injury in August 2023. He is assumed to return in January 2024.)

- Last updated: 6 August 2023
- Source: and
- Ordered by squad number.

== Transfers ==
=== In ===
No.	Pos.	Player	Transferred from	Fee	Date	Source
5	MF	(Spain) Javi Muñoz	Eibar	Free transfer	1 July 2023	
7	FW	(Spain) Cristian Herrera	Ibiza	Free transfer	1 July 2023	
9	FW	(Spain) Sandro Ramírez	Huesca	€1,500,000	1 July 2023	
18	DF	(Netherlands) Daley Sinkgraven	(Germany) Bayer Leverkusen	Free transfer	11 July 2023	
1	GK	(Spain) Aarón Escandell	Cartagena	€400,000	25 July 2023	
17	FW	(Morocco) Munir El Haddadi	Getafe	Free transfer	30 July 2023	
15	DF	(Spain) Mika Mármol	FC Andorra	€2,000,000	11 August 2023	
16	FW	(Guinea) Sory Kaba	(Denmark) Midtjylland	€3,000,000	17 August 2023	
Total					€6,900,000	

=== Out ===
No.	Pos.	Player	Transferred to	Fee	Date	Source
18	DF	(Brazil) Sidnei	(Brazil) Ceará	End of contract	1 July 2023	
17	MF	(Spain) Óscar Clemente	Levante	End of contract	1 July 2023	
25	MF	(Cameroon) Wilfrid Kaptoum	(Cyprus) AEK Larnaca	Free transfer	6 July 2023	
–	MF	(Spain) Unai Veiga	Unattached	Released	8 July 2023	
–	FW	(Guinea-Bissau) Claudio Mendes	Cornellà	Free transfer	19 July 2023	
1	GK	(Spain) Álex Domínguez	(France) Toulouse	Undisclosed	26 July 2023	
16	FW	(Romania) Florin Andone	Eldense	Free transfer	30 July 2023	
18	FW	(Spain) Pinchi	(Turkey) Çaykur Rizespor	Free transfer (Note: Las Palmas reserves a right for 20% of any future sale.)	10 August 2023	
Total					€0,000,000	

=== Loans in ===
No.	Pos.	Player	Loaned from	Fee	Date	On loan until	Source
28	DF	(Mexico) Julián Araujo	Barcelona	None	1 August 2023	End of season	
2	DF	(Spain) Marvin Park	Real Madrid	None	18 August 2023	End of season	
8	MF	(Argentina) Máximo Perrone	(England) Manchester City	None	23 August 2023	End of season	
Total						€0,000,000	

=== Loans out ===
No.	Pos.	Player	Loaned to	Fee	Date	On loan until	Source
27	FW	(Spain) Ale García	Antequera	None	4 July 2023	End of season	
20	FW	(Spain) Joel del Pino	Real Avilés	None	14 July 2023	End of season	
5	MF	(Spain) Enrique Clemente	Racing Ferrol	None	1 August 2023	End of season	
26	DF	(Spain) Alejandro Palanca	Ponferradina	None	23 August 2023	End of season	
Total						€0,000,000	

== Pre-season and friendlies ==
On 29 June 2023, Las Palmas announced they would play their five friendly matches at the Marbella Football Center in Málaga, against Orlando Pirates on 19 July, Al-Wakrah on 22 July, Almería on 23 July, Espanyol on 26 July and Cádiz on 28 July.

On 22 July, Las Palmas announced they would face RB Leipzig on 5 August, in part of the latter side's presentation game of the season at the Red Bull Arena in Leipzig.

Win Draw Loss Fixtures

19 July 2023 Friendly	Las Palmas	0–0	Orlando Pirates	Málaga
10:00 CEST (UTC+2)		Report		Stadium: Banús Football Center; Referee: Abraham Domínguez Cervantes

23 July 2023 Friendly	Las Palmas	2–0	Al-Wakrah	Málaga
19:00 CEST (UTC+2)	Muñoz 21'; Ramírez 79'	Report		Stadium: Marbella Football Center; Referee: Luis Milla Alvendiz

24 July 2023 Friendly	Almería	0–0	Las Palmas	Málaga
17:00 CEST (UTC+2)		Report		Stadium: La Quinta Football Center; Referee: Pablo Morales Moreno

27 July 2023 Friendly	Las Palmas	1–2	Espanyol	Málaga
17:00 CEST (UTC+2)	Muñoz 80'	Report	Lozano 62'; Rubén 88'	Stadium: Marbella Football Center; Referee: José Luis Guzmán Mansilla

28 July 2023 Friendly	Cádiz	0–1	Las Palmas	Málaga
10:00 CEST (UTC+2)		Report	Ramírez 65'; Loiodice (yellow card) (yellow-red card) 81'	Stadium: Marbella Football Center; Referee: Abraham Domínguez Cervantes

5 August 2023 Friendly	RB Leipzig	3–0	Las Palmas	Leipzig
13:30 CEST (UTC+2)	Openda 23', 34'; Šeško 55'	Report	Suárez (yellow card) 60'; S. Cardona (yellow card) 63'; Sinkgraven (yellow card) 64'; M. Cardona (yellow card) 85'	Stadium: Red Bull Arena; Attendance: 15,134; Referee: Alexander Sather (Germany)

== Competitions ==
=== Overall record ===
Competition	First match	Last match	Starting round	Final position	Record							
Competition	First match	Last match	Starting round	Final position	Pld	W	D	L	GF	GA	GD	Win %
La Liga	12 August 2023	26 May 2024	Matchday 1	16th	38	10	10	18	33	47	−14	26.32
Copa del Rey	31 October 2023	7 January 2024	First round	Round of 32	3	2	0	1	5	3	+2	66.67
Total					41	12	10	19	38	50	−12	29.27

Source: Soccerway

=== La Liga ===
==== League table ====
Pos	Team	Pld	W	D	L	GF	GA	GD	Pts	Qualification or relegation
14	Sevilla	38	10	11	17	48	54	−6	41 (Note: Celta Vigo finished ahead of Sevilla on head-to-head points: Celta Vigo 1–1 Sevilla, Sevilla 1–2 Celta Vigo.)	
15	Mallorca	38	8	16	14	33	44	−11	40 (Note: Mallorca finished ahead of Las Palmas on head-to-head points: Las Palmas 1–1 Mallorca, Mallorca 1–0 Las Palmas.)	
16	Las Palmas	38	10	10	18	33	47	−14	40	
17	Rayo Vallecano	38	8	14	16	29	48	−19	38	
18	Cádiz (R)	38	6	15	17	26	55	−29	33	Relegation to Segunda División

Source: LaLiga EA Sports
Rules for classification: 1) Points; 2) Head-to-head points; 3) Head-to-head goal difference; 4) Goal difference; 5) Goals scored; 6) Fair-play points
(Note: Head-to-head record is used only after all the matches between the teams in question have been played)
(R) Relegation

==== Results summary ====
Overall								Home						Away					
Pld	W	D	L	GF	GA	GD	Pts	W	D	L	GF	GA	GD	W	D	L	GF	GA	GD
38	10	10	18	33	47	−14	40	6	6	7	20	20	0	4	4	11	13	27	−14

Source: La Liga

==== Results by round ====
Round	1	2	3	4	5	6	7	8	9	10	11	12	13	14	15	16	17	18	19	20	21	22	23	24	25	26	27	28	29	30	31	32	33	34	35	36	37	38
Ground	H	A	H	A	A	H	A	H	A	H	A	H	A	A	H	A	H	A	H	H	A	H	A	H	A	H	A	H	H	A	H	A	H	A	A	H	A	H
Result	D	L	D	L	L	W	L	W	W	L	W	W	D	L	W	W	D	L	L	W	W	L	D	W	L	D	D	L	L	L	L	L	L	L	L	D	D	D
Position	10	14	16	18	19	15	17	14	10	12	10	8	8	11	8	8	9	9	10	9	8	9	9	8	9	8	8	9	11	12	12	13	14	14	14	14	15	16

Source: La Liga
A = Away; H = Home; W = Win; D = Draw; L = Loss

==== Matches ====
The league fixtures were announced on 22 June 2023.

12 August 2023 1	Las Palmas	1–1	Mallorca	Las Palmas
19:30 CEST (UTC+2)	Viera 29' (pen.); Rodríguez (yellow card) 39'; Lemos (yellow card) 84'; Loiodice (yellow card) 84'	Report	Muriqi (penalty missed) 41'; Mascarell (yellow card) 53'; Raíllo 70'	Stadium: Estadio Gran Canaria; Attendance: 24,100; Referee: Víctor García Verdura

18 August 2023 2	Valencia	1–0	Las Palmas	Valencia
21:30 CEST (UTC+2)	Pepelu 74' (pen.)	Report		Stadium: Mestalla; Attendance: 41,053; Referee: Javier Iglesias Villanueva

25 August 2023 3	Las Palmas	0–0	Real Sociedad	Las Palmas
19:30 CEST (UTC+2)	S. Cardona (yellow card) 45'	Report	Le Normand (yellow card) 44'; Méndez (yellow card) 72'; Zubeldia (yellow card) 82'; Sadiq (yellow card) 90+1'	Stadium: Estadio Gran Canaria; Attendance: 25,335; Referee: Guillermo Cuadra Fernández

2 September 2023 4	Girona	1–0	Las Palmas	Girona
14:00 CEST (UTC+2)	Sávio (yellow card) 23'; López (yellow card) 67'; Couto (yellow card) 85'; Portu 88'	Report	S. Cardona (yellow card) 26'; Mármol (yellow card) 35'; Rodríguez (yellow card) 48'	Stadium: Montilivi; Attendance: 11,619; Referee: Mateo Busquets Ferrer

17 September 2023 5	Sevilla	1–0	Las Palmas	Seville
18:30 CEST (UTC+2)	Óliver (yellow card) 32'; Mir (yellow card) 38'; Ocampos (yellow card) 69'; Lukebakio 71'	Report	Munir (yellow card) 49'; Araujo (yellow card) 50'; Rodríguez (yellow card) 52'; Viera (yellow card) 62'; Pejiño (yellow card) 63'	Stadium: Ramón Sánchez Pizjuán; Attendance: 40,578; Referee: Juan Martínez Munuera

24 September 2023 6	Las Palmas	1–0	Granada	Las Palmas
18:30 CEST (UTC+2)	Suárez (yellow card) 41'; Marmol (yellow card) 42' (yellow-red card) 58'; Araujo (yellow card) 43'; Mfulu (yellow card) 58'; Kaba (yellow card) 80'; Rodríguez 90+2'	Report	Gumbau (yellow card) 7'; Villar (yellow card) 70'; Sánchez (yellow card) 82'; Fernández (yellow card) 89'	Stadium: Estadio Gran Canaria; Attendance: 24,848; Referee: Ricardo De Burgos Bengoetxea

27 September 2023 7	Real Madrid	2–0	Las Palmas	Madrid
19:00 CEST (UTC+2)	Brahim 45+3'; Joselu 54'	Report	Coco (yellow card) 79'	Stadium: Santiago Bernabéu; Attendance: 65,017; Referee: José Luis Munuera Montero

2 October 2023 8	Las Palmas	2–1	Celta Vigo	Las Palmas
21:00 CEST (UTC+2)	Mármol (yellow card) 74'; Viera 84' (pen.); M. Cardona 90+7', (yellow card) 90+8'	Report	Douvikas 67'; Starfelt (yellow card) 83'	Stadium: Estadio Gran Canaria; Attendance: 22,472; Referee: Javier Alberola Rojas

8 October 2023 9	Villarreal	1–2	Las Palmas	Villarreal
14:00 CEST (UTC+2)	Pino (yellow card) 45+1'; Parejo (yellow card) 68'; Gerard 90+2'; Akhomach (yellow card) 90+6'; Capoue (yellow card) 90+10'	Report	Coco 45+2'; M. Cardona 51' (pen.), (yellow card) 90+4'; Marvin (yellow card) 68'; Rodríguez (yellow card) 72'; Kaba (yellow card) 90+5'	Stadium: Estadio de la Cerámica; Attendance: 16,249; Referee: Alejandro Muñiz Ruiz

22 October 2023 10	Las Palmas	0–1	Rayo Vallecano	Las Palmas
14:00 CEST (UTC+2)	Coco (yellow card) 20'; Munir (penalty missed) 34'; Muñoz (yellow card) 77'; Suárez (yellow card) 90+1'; Perrone (yellow card) 90+5'	Report	Camello (yellow card) 79'; Valentín (yellow card) 86' (yellow-red card) 90+4'; Bebé 90+2' (pen.)	Stadium: Estadio Gran Canaria; Attendance: 24,548; Referee: Javier Iglesias Villanueva

28 October 2023 11	Almería	1–2	Las Palmas	Almería
14:00 CEST (UTC+2)	Baba (yellow card) 18'; Robertone (yellow card) 31'; Montes (yellow card) 32'; Ramazani 73'	Report	Munir 23'; S. Cardona (yellow card) 43'; Kaba 90+4'	Stadium: Power Horse Stadium; Attendance: 12,132; Referee: Francisco José Hernández Maeso

3 November 2023 12	Las Palmas	2–1	Atlético Madrid	Las Palmas
21:00 CET (UTC+1)	Rodríguez 51'; Benito 75'	Report	De Paul (yellow card) 62'; Morata 83'; Giménez (yellow card) 90+3'; Savić (yellow card) 90+9'	Stadium: Estadio Gran Canaria; Attendance: 30,080; Referee: Mario Melero López

11 November 2023 13	Osasuna	1–1	Las Palmas	Pamplona
18:30 CET (UTC+1)	Budimir 73'; Catena (yellow card) 84'	Report	Moleiro 70'; Araujo (yellow card) 87'	Stadium: El Sadar; Attendance: 20,125; Referee: Jorge Figueroa Vázquez

26 November 2023 14	Real Betis	1–0	Las Palmas	Seville
21:00 CET (UTC+1)	Willian José 19'; Iglesias (yellow card) 90+6'	Report	Perrone (yellow card) 33'; Munir (yellow card) 53'	Stadium: Benito Villamarín; Attendance: 48,142; Referee: Victor García Verdura

1 December 2023 15	Las Palmas	2–0	Getafe	Las Palmas
21:00 CET (UTC+1)	Araujo 43'; Herrera 90+2'	Report	Óscar (yellow card) 11'; Alderete (red card) 48'; Suárez (yellow card) 55'; Rico (yellow card) 69'; Milla (yellow card) 70'; Angileri (yellow card) 90+1'	Stadium: Estadio Gran Canaria; Attendance: 21,912; Referee: Mateo Busquets Ferrer

9 December 2023 16	Alavés	0–1	Las Palmas	Vitoria-Gasteiz
14:00 CET (UTC+1)	Abqar (yellow card) 48'; Gorosabel (yellow card) 90+2'	Report	S. Cardona (yellow card) 9'; Rodríguez 31'; Muñoz (yellow card) 33'; Marvin (yellow card) 90+7'; Herrera (yellow card) 90+8'	Stadium: Mendizorrotza; Attendance: 15,971; Referee: José Luis Munuera Montero

17 December 2023 17	Las Palmas	1–1	Cádiz	Las Palmas
18:30 CET (UTC+1)	Pejiño 7'; Rodríguez (yellow card) 90+4'	Report	Alejo (yellow card) 25'; Lucas Pires (yellow card) 30'; Fali (yellow card) 33'; Ramos 83'	Stadium: Estadio Gran Canaria; Attendance: 25,275; Referee: Alejandro Muñiz Ruiz

20 December 2023 18	Athletic Bilbao	1–0	Las Palmas	Bilbao
21:30 CET (UTC+1)	Guruzeta (penalty missed) 40'; Gómez 90+4'; I. Williams (yellow card) 90+7'	Report	Araujo (yellow card) 39'; Perrone (yellow card) 68'; Loiodice (yellow card) 90+7'	Stadium: San Mamés; Attendance: 39,471; Referee: Juan Martínez Munuera

4 January 2024 19	Las Palmas	1–2	Barcelona	Las Palmas
21:30 CET (UTC+1)	Munir 12'; Suárez (yellow card) 58'; Coco (yellow card) 79'; Muñoz (yellow card) 88'; S. Cardona (yellow card) 90'; Sinkgraven (red card) 90+1'; Rodríguez (yellow card) 90+2'	Report	Roberto (yellow card) 20'; Torres 56'; Yamal (yellow card) 81'; Gündoğan 90+3' (pen.)	Stadium: Estadio Gran Canaria; Attendance: 31,712; Referee: Pablo González Fuertes

13 January 2024 20	Las Palmas	3–0	Villarreal	Las Palmas
14:00 CET (UTC+1)	Rodríguez 8', 63'; Suárez (yellow card) 16'; Muñoz (yellow card) 16'; Herzog (yellow card) 34', (goal) 51'; S. Cardona (yellow card) 43'	Report	Altimira (yellow card) 1'; Baena (yellow card) 19'; Bailly (yellow card) 39'	Stadium: Estadio Gran Canaria; Attendance: 24,485; Referee: Javier Iglesias Villanueva

20 January 2024 21	Rayo Vallecano	0–2	Las Palmas	Madrid
14:00 CET (UTC+1)	Balliu (yellow card) 17'; Palazón (yellow card) 69'; García (yellow card) 76' (yellow-red card) 81'	Report	Moleiro 35'; Valles (yellow card) 80'; Muñoz 83'	Stadium: Campo de Fútbol de Vallecas; Attendance: 12,477; Referee: Mario Melero López

27 January 2024 22	Las Palmas	1–2	Real Madrid	Las Palmas
16:15 CET (UTC+1)	Muñoz 53', (yellow card) 82'; Rodríguez (yellow card) 55'; Perrone (yellow card) 90+5'	Report	Rodrygo (yellow card) 5'; Vinícius 65'; Mendy (yellow card) 90+7'; Tchouaméni 84', (yellow card) 90+9'	Stadium: Estadio Gran Canaria; Attendance: 32,037; Referee: César Soto Grado

3 February 2024 23	Granada	1–1	Las Palmas	Granada
16:15 CET (UTC+1)	Batalla (yellow card) 21'; Piątkowski (red card) 21'; Méndez 43'; Arezo (yellow card) 45+1'; Villar (yellow card) 45+4'; Neva (yellow card) 45+5'	Report	Marvin (yellow card) 42'; Sandro (yellow card) 45+5'; Pejiño 68'; Escandell (red card) 71'; Loiodice (yellow card) 86'	Stadium: Nuevo Los Cármenes; Attendance: 17,941; Referee: Mateo Busquets Ferrer

10 February 2024 24	Las Palmas	2–0	Valencia	Las Palmas
21:00 CET (UTC+1)	Mármol (yellow card) 48'; Suárez 89'; M. Cardona 90+5', (yellow card) 90+6'	Report		Stadium: Estadio Gran Canaria; Attendance: 25,633; Referee: Guillermo Cuadra Fernández

17 February 2024 25	Atlético Madrid	5–0	Las Palmas	Madrid
14:00 CET (UTC+1)	Llorente 15', 20'; Molina (yellow card) 28'; Saúl (yellow card) 33'; Correa 47', 62' (pen.); Depay 87'	Report	Perrone (yellow card) 4'	Stadium: Cívitas Metropolitano; Attendance: 61,196; Referee: Jorge Figueroa Vázquez

25 February 2024 26	Las Palmas	1–1	Osasuna	Las Palmas
18:30 CET (UTC+1)	Suárez (yellow card) 49'; Rodríguez 52'; Coco (yellow card) 90+3'	Report	Moncayola (yellow card) 45'; U. García 49'	Stadium: Estadio Gran Canaria; Attendance: 25,075; Referee: José Luis Munuera Montero

2 March 2024 27	Getafe	3–3	Las Palmas	Getafe
18:30 CET (UTC+1)	Carmona (yellow card) 7'; Mata 11', (yellow card) 67'; Greenwood 14', (yellow card) 43'; Maksimović 45'; Moriba (yellow card) 60'	Report	Sandro 35'; S. Cardona 50'; Munir 57'; Muñoz (yellow card) 67'	Stadium: Coliseum; Attendance: 7,623; Referee: Pablo González Fuertes

10 March 2024 28	Las Palmas	0–2	Athletic Bilbao	Las Palmas
16:15 CET (UTC+1)	Coco (yellow card) 64'; M. Cardona (yellow card) 81'; Valles (yellow card) 82'	Report	Guruzeta 31'; Vivian (yellow card) 48'; Coco 65' (o.g.); De Marcos (yellow card) 67'; Paredes (yellow card) 90+1'	Stadium: Estadio Gran Canaria; Attendance: 27,316; Referee: Miguel Ángel Ortiz Arias

17 March 2024 29	Las Palmas	0–1	Almería	Las Palmas
16:15 CET (UTC+1)	Perrone (yellow card) 26'; Marvin (yellow card) 80'	Report	Centelles (yellow card) 8'; Baptistão 14'; Langa (yellow card) 90+4'	Stadium: Estadio Gran Canaria; Attendance: 22,865; Referee: Víctor García Verdura

30 March 2024 30	Barcelona	1–0	Las Palmas	Barcelona
21:00 CET (UTC+1)	Gündoğan (yellow card) 52'; Raphinha 59'; Roberto (yellow card) 63'; Martínez (yellow card) 64'; Lewandowski (yellow card) 81'; Cancelo (yellow card) 88'	Report	S. Cardona (yellow card) 14'; Valles (red card) 24'	Stadium: Estadi Olímpic Lluís Companys; Attendance: 46,788; Referee: Mateo Busquets Ferrer

14 April 2024 31	Las Palmas	0–2	Sevilla	Las Palmas
14:00 CEST (UTC+2)	Coco (red card) 6'; Suárez (yellow card) 7'; Sandro (yellow card) 43'; Marvin (yellow card) 45+4'	Report	En-Nesyri 43'; Badé (yellow card) 61'; Salas (yellow card) 73'; Nyland (yellow card) 90+1'; Lukebakio 90+3'	Stadium: Estadio Gran Canaria; Attendance: 23,698; Referee: Alejandro Muñiz Ruiz

20 April 2024 32	Celta Vigo	4–1	Las Palmas	Vigo
14:00 CEST (UTC+2)	Aspas 37', 76'; Swedberg 39'; Larsen (yellow card) 66'; Douvikas 71'	Report	Herzog 11'	Stadium: Balaídos; Attendance: 21,256; Referee: Francisco José Hernández Maeso

27 April 2024 33	Las Palmas	0–2	Girona	Las Palmas
14:00 CEST (UTC+2)	Sandro (penalty missed) 8'; Rodríguez (yellow card) 39'; Mármol (yellow card) 45+4'	Report	Dovbyk (penalty missed) 26', (yellow card) 37', (goal) 57' (pen.); López 26'; Herrera (yellow card) 39'; Couto (yellow card) 69'	Stadium: Estadio Gran Canaria; Attendance: 18,734; Referee: Jorge Figueroa Vázquez

4 May 2024 34	Real Sociedad	2–0	Las Palmas	San Sebastián
14:00 CEST (UTC+2)	Galán (yellow card) 17'; Suárez 33' (o.g.); Le Normand (yellow card) 40'; Becker 45+1'	Report	S. Cardona (yellow card) 67'	Stadium: Reale Arena; Attendance: 29,330; Referee: Miguel Ángel Ortiz Arias

11 May 2024 35	Mallorca	1–0	Las Palmas	Palma
14:00 CEST (UTC+2)	González (yellow card) 14', (goal) 29'; J. Costa (yellow card) 45+1'; S. Costa (yellow card) 70'; Valjent (yellow card) 78'; Muriqi (yellow card) 80'; Copete (yellow card) 85'	Report	Araujo (yellow card) 59'; Sandro (yellow card) 90+3'	Stadium: Estadi Mallorca Son Moix; Attendance: 16,050; Referee: Juan Martínez Munuera

16 May 2024 36	Las Palmas	2–2	Real Betis	Las Palmas
19:30 CEST (UTC+2)	Suárez (yellow card) 5', (goal) 27'; Moleiro 64'; Coco (yellow card) 70'	Report	Mármol 21' (o.g.); Ruibal (yellow card) 26'; Pérez 49'	Stadium: Estadio Gran Canaria; Attendance: 22,606; Referee: Javier Iglesias Villanueva

19 May 2024 37	Cádiz	0–0	Las Palmas	Cádiz
19:00 CEST (UTC+2)	Ramos (yellow card) 45+1'; J. Hernández (yellow card) 46'; Chust (red card) 74'; Ocampo (yellow card) 82'	Report	M. Cardona (yellow card) 83'	Stadium: Nuevo Mirandilla; Attendance: 18,950; Referee: César Soto Grado

26 May 2024 38	Las Palmas	1–1	Alavés	Las Palmas
16:15 CEST (UTC+2)	M. Cardona 71'; González (yellow card) 74'; Moleiro (yellow card) 76'	Report	Simeone (penalty missed) 33'; Hagi (yellow card) 37'; Vicente 50'	Stadium: Estadio Gran Canaria; Attendance: 23,043; Referee: Francisco José Hernández Maeso

=== Copa del Rey ===
Las Palmas entered the tournament in the first round against Manacor, who played in the Tercera Federación.

31 October 2023 First round	Manacor	0–3	Las Palmas	Manacor
21:00 CET (UTC+1)	Chakroun (yellow card) 63'	Report	Araujo 68'; Moleiro 76'; Ferrer 86'	Stadium: Na Capellera; Attendance: 2,600; Referee: Jorge Figueroa Vázquez

6 December 2023 Second round	Tudelano	1–2 (a.e.t.)	Las Palmas	Tudela
21:00 CET (UTC+1)	Rodríguez 42' (pen.); Colau (yellow card) 45+2'; Santigosa (yellow card) 70'	Report	Kaba 38'; M. Cardona (yellow card) 69'; Suárez (yellow card) 72'; Aarón (yellow card) 112'; Munir 120+4'	Stadium: Ciudad de Tudela; Attendance: 6,000; Referee: Juan Martínez Munuera

7 January 2024 Round of 32	Tenerife	2–0	Las Palmas	Santa Cruz de Tenerife
20:00 WET (UTC+0)	Amo 4', (yellow card) 48' (yellow-red card) 62'; Luismi 21'; Williams (yellow card) 28'; Sanz (yellow card) 29'; Nacho (yellow card) 59'	Report	Bassinga (yellow card) 23'; Araujo (yellow card) 76', (red card) 76'	Stadium: Heliodoro Rodríguez López; Attendance: 21,417; Referee: Ricardo de Burgos Bengoetxea

== Statistics ==
=== Overall ===
As of 17 December 2023

No..	Pos.	Nat.	Player	La Liga		Copa del Rey		Total		Discipline		Notes
No..	Pos.	Nat.	Player	Apps	Goals	Apps	Goals	Apps	Goals	Yellow card	Red card	Notes
Goalkeepers
1	GK	(Spain)	Aarón Escandell	0	0	2	0	2	0	1	0	
13	GK	(Spain)	Álvaro Valles	17	0	0	0	17	0	0	0	
Defenders
2	DF	(Spain)	Marvin Park	4+9	0	0+1	0	14	0	2	0	On loan
3	DF	(Spain)	Sergi Cardona	13+3	0	0	0	16	0	5	0	
4	DF	(Spain)	Álex Suárez	13	0	1	0	14	0	3	0	
6	DF	(Spain)	Eric Curbelo	1	0	1	0	2	0	0	0	
14	DF	(Spain)	Álvaro Lemos	2+1	0	0	0	3	0	1	0	
15	DF	(Spain)	Mika Mármol	15	0	0	0	10	0	2	1	
18	DF	(Netherlands)	Daley Sinkgraven	4+1	0	2	0	7	0	0	0	
23	DF	(Equatorial Guinea)	Saúl Coco	11+3	1	0+1	0	15	1	2	0	
28	DF	(Mexico)	Julián Araujo	9+6	1	1+1	1	17	1	2	0	On loan
31	DF	(Spain)	Juanma Herzog	0	0	2	0	2	0	0	0	
Midfielders
5	MF	(Spain)	Javi Muñoz	13+4	0	0	0	17	0	2	0	
8	MF	(Argentina)	Máximo Perrone	6+8	0	1	0	15	0	2	0	On loan
10	MF	(Spain)	Alberto Moleiro	5+3	1	0+2	1	10	2	0	0	
12	MF	(France)	Enzo Loiodice	11+6	0	1+1	0	19	0	1	0	
20	MF	(Spain)	Kirian Rodríguez	16+1	3	0	0	17	3	5	0	
21	MF	(Spain)	Jonathan Viera	7+2	2	0	0	9	2	1	0	
22	MF	(Democratic Republic of the Congo)	Omenuke Mfulu	1+3	0	2	0	6	0	1	0	
26	MF	(Spain)	Yadam Santana	0	0	1	0	1	0	0	0	
Forwards
7	FW	(Spain)	Cristian Herrera	1+5	1	2	0	8	1	1	0	
9	FW	(Spain)	Sandro Ramírez	5+1	0	0	0	6	0	0	0	
11	FW	(Spain)	Benito Ramírez	0+8	1	2	0	10	1	0	0	
16	FW	(Guinea)	Sory Kaba	6+5	1	2	1	13	2	2	0	
17	FW	(Morocco)	Munir El Haddadi	16+1	1	0+1	1	12	2	2	0	
19	FW	(Spain)	Marc Cardona	5+5	2	1	0	11	2	2	0	
24	FW	(Spain)	Pejiño	6+3	1	1+1	0	11	1	1	0	
27	FW	(Spain)	Pau Ferrer	0	0	0+1	1	1	1	0	0	

=== Goalscorers ===
As of 3 November 2023

Rank	No.	Pos.	Nat.	Player	La Liga	Copa del Rey	Total
1	21	MF	(Spain)	Jonathan Viera	2	0	2
1	19	FW	(Spain)	Marc Cardona	2	0	2
1	20	MF	(Spain)	Kirian Rodríguez	2	0	2
2	23	DF	(Equatorial Guinea)	Saúl Coco	1	0	1
2	17	FW	(Morocco)	Munir El Haddadi	1	0	1
2	16	FW	(Guinea)	Sory Kaba	1	0	1
2	28	DF	(Mexico)	Julián Araujo	0	1	1
2	10	MF	(Spain)	Alberto Moleiro	0	1	1
2	27	FW	(Spain)	Pau Ferrer	0	1	1
2	11	FW	(Spain)	Benito Ramírez	1	0	1
Totals					10	3	13

=== Assists ===
As of 3 November 2023

Rank	No.	Pos.	Nat.	Player	La Liga	Copa del Rey	Total
1	7	FW	(Spain)	Cristian Herrera	0	2	2
2	21	MF	(Spain)	Jonathan Viera	1	0	1
2	16	FW	(Guinea)	Sory Kaba	1	0	1
2	2	DF	(Spain)	Marvin Park	1	0	1
2	27	FW	(Spain)	Pau Ferrer	0	1	1
2	10	MF	(Spain)	Alberto Moleiro	1	0	1
2	17	FW	(Morocco)	Munir El Haddadi	1	0	1
Totals					5	3	6

=== Cleansheets ===
As of 3 November 2023

Rank	No.	Nat.	Player	La Liga	Copa del Rey	Total
1	13	(Spain)	Álvaro Valles	2	0	2
2	1	(Spain)	Aarón Escandell	0	1	1
Totals				2	1	3
