= Mika Mármol =

Spanish footballer (born 2001)

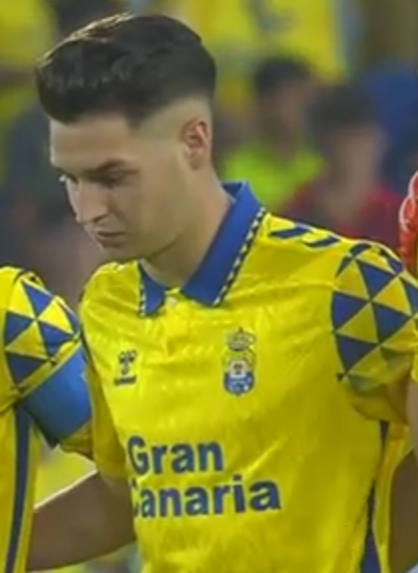
- Mármol in 2024 with Las Palmas

Personal information
- Full name: Mika Mármol Medina
- Date of birth: 1 July 2001 (age 25)
- Place of birth: Terrassa, Spain
- Height: 1.81 m (5 ft 11 in)
- Positions: Centre-back; left-back

Team information
- Current team: Feyenoord
- Number: 35

Youth career
- 2006–2008: Barcelona
- 2008–2013: Jàbac Terrassa
- 2013–2017: Damm
- 2017–2018: Jàbac Terrassa
- 2018–2019: Barcelona

Senior career*
Years	Team	Apps	(Gls)
2019–2022	Barcelona B	62	(3)
2022	Barcelona	1	(0)
2022–2023	Andorra	37	(1)
2023–2026	Las Palmas	102	(3)
2026–	Feyenoord	11	(0)

International career
2019	Spain U19	2	(0)
2019	Spain U20	5	(0)
2024–	Catalonia	2	(0)
- * Club domestic league appearances and goals as of 31 October 2026

Mika Mármol Medina (born 1 July 2001) is a Spanish professional footballer who plays for Eredivisie club Feyenoord. Mainly a centre-back, he can also play as a left-back.

== Club career ==
=== Barcelona ===
Born in Terrassa, Barcelona, Catalonia, Mármol started his career with FC Barcelona in 2006. He left two years later and continued his development in the academies of UFB Jàbac Terrassa and CF Damm before returning to Barcelona in June 2018. He made his senior debut with Barcelona B on 12 October 2019, coming on as a late substitute for Óscar Mingueza in a 3–0 Segunda División B home win over Orihuela CF.

On 1 July 2020, Mármol renewed his contract with Barça and was permanently promoted to the B team. He became a regular starter for the side and scored his first senior goal on 17 January 2021 in a 3–1 away loss to Gimnàstic de Tarragona.

Mármol made his first-team and La Liga debut for Barcelona on 15 May 2022, replacing fellow youth graduate Alejandro Balde late in a 0–0 away draw against Getafe CF.

=== Andorra ===
On 30 August 2022, Mármol signed a two-year contract with Segunda División newcomers FC Andorra. He became a regular starter for the club and scored his first professional goal on 27 May 2023, netting the second goal in a 4–3 home win over Villarreal CF B.

=== Las Palmas ===
On 11 August 2023, Mármol joined UD Las Palmas, newly promoted to the top tier, on a three-year deal.

=== Feyenoord ===
On 30 June 2026, Dutch club Feyenoord announced that Mármol had signed a four-year contract with the club.

== Career statistics ==
=== Club ===
As of match played 3 November 2026

Appearances and goals by club, season and competition
Club	Season	League			Cup		Europe		Other		Total											
Club	Season	Division	Apps	Goals	Apps	Goals	Apps	Goals	Apps	Goals	Apps	Goals										
Barcelona B	2019–20	Segunda División B	2	0	—		—		0	0	2	0										
Barcelona B	2020–21	Segunda División B	24 (Note: Includes five appearances in second phase)	2	—		—		1 (Note: Appearances(s) in Segunda División B play-offs)	0	25	2										
Barcelona B	2021–22	Primera Federación	36	1	—		—		—		34	1										
Barcelona B	Total		62	3	—		—		1	0	63	3										
Barcelona	2021–22	La Liga	1	0	0	0	—		—		1	0										
Andorra	2022–23	Segunda División	37	1	1	0	—		—		38	1										
Las Palmas	2023–24	La Liga	36	0	0	0	—		—		36	-	2024–25	La Liga	30	0	3	0	—	—	33	0
Las Palmas	2025–26	Segunda División	36	3	—		—		2 (Note: Appearances in La Liga play-offs)	0	38	3										
Las Palmas	Total		102	3	3	0	—		2	0	107	3										
Las Palmas	Feyenoord	2026–27	Eredivisie	11	0	0	0	4 (Note: Appearances in UEFA Champions League)	0	—		15	0									
Career total			213	7	4	0	4	0	3	0	224	7										
