= Aarón Escandell =

Spanish footballer

Aarón
Personal information
- Full name: Aarón Escandell Banacloche
- Date of birth: 27 September 1995 (age 31)
- Place of birth: Carcaixent, Spain
- Height: 1.84 m (6 ft 0 in)
- Position: Goalkeeper

Team information
- Current team: Oviedo
- Number: 13

Youth career
- 2003–2008: Villarreal
- 2008–2012: Valencia
- 2012–2014: Málaga

Senior career*
Years	Team	Apps	(Gls)
2013–2017	Málaga B	83	(0)
2017–2018	Granada B	32	(0)
2018–2022	Granada	13	(0)
2022–2023	Cartagena	36	(0)
2023–2024	Las Palmas	2	(0)
2024–	Oviedo	77	(0)
- * Club domestic league appearances and goals as of 14 May 2026

Aarón Escandell Banacloche (born 27 September 1995), simply known as Aarón, is a Spanish professional footballer who plays as a goalkeeper for Real Oviedo.

== Career ==
=== Málaga ===
Born in Carcaixent, Valencia, Aarón finished his formation with Málaga CF. He made his senior debut for the reserves on 15 September 2013, starting in a 0–0 away draw against Atarfe Industrial CF in the Tercera División.

On 8 December 2013 Aarón first appeared with the main squad, being an unused substitute in a 3–3 Copa del Rey home draw against CA Osasuna. For the 2015–16 campaign, he was chosen as third choice behind Guillermo Ochoa and Carlos Kameni.

=== Granada ===
On 10 July 2017, Aarón moved to another reserve team, Granada CF B of the Segunda División B. The following 6 June, he signed a new two-year deal with the club and was definitely promoted to the main squad in the Segunda División.

Aarón made his professional debut on 13 September 2018, starting in a 2–1 loss at Elche CF, in the season's Copa del Rey. His first league game occurred the following 9 June, playing the full 90 minutes in a 2–1 home win against AD Alcorcón, as his side was already promoted.

A backup to Rui Silva, Aarón made his La Liga debut on 8 February 2020, starting in a 1–0 loss at Atlético Madrid. On 10 December, he made his European bow in a UEFA Europa League group stage game away to PAOK FC, a goalless draw.

Silva left Granada in the summer of 2021 and Aarón became the new starting goalkeeper for the first matches of the season under incoming manager Robert Moreno, despite the arrival of another Portuguese, Luís Maximiano. Maximiano, however, got the starting spot in September, being regularly used afterwards as the campaign ended in relegation.

=== Cartagena ===
On 2 July 2022, Aarón signed a two-year contract with second division side FC Cartagena. He overcame longtime incumbent Marc Martínez as first-choice during the season, featuring in 36 matches.

=== Las Palmas ===
On 24 July 2023, Aarón agreed to a two-year deal with UD Las Palmas, newly-promoted to the top tier. A backup to Álvaro Valles during the entire campaign, he only featured in five matches overall before terminating his contract on 9 July 2024.

=== Oviedo ===
On 10 July 2024, Aarón signed for Real Oviedo in the second division for two years.

== Career statistics ==
As of match played 14 May 2026

Appearances and goals by club, season and competition
Club	Season	League			National cup		Continental		Other		Total	
Club	Season	Division	Apps	Goals	Apps	Goals	Apps	Goals	Apps	Goals	Apps	Goals
Málaga B	2013–14	Tercera División	1	0	—		—		2 (Note: Appearance(s) in Promotion Playoffs)	0	3	0
Málaga B	2014–15	Tercera División	25	0	—		—		2	0	27	0
Málaga B	2015–16	Tercera División	29	0	—		—		4	0	33	0
Málaga B	2016–17	Tercera División	28	0	—		—		6	0	34	0
Málaga B	Total		83	0	—		—		14	0	97	0
Málaga	2013–14	La Liga	0	0	0	0	—		—		0	0
Málaga	2015–16	La Liga	0	0	0	0	—		—		0	0
Málaga	2016–17	La Liga	0	0	0	0	—		—		0	0
Málaga	Total		0	0	0	0	—		—		0	0
Granada B	2017–18	Segunda División B	32	0	0	0	—		—		32	0
Granada	2017–18	Segunda División	0	0	0	0	—		—		0	0
Granada	2018–19	Segunda División	1	0	1	0	—		—		2	0
Granada	2019–20	La Liga	3	0	5	0	—		—		8	0
Granada	2020–21	La Liga	5	0	5	0	1 (Note: Appearance(s) in UEFA Europa League)	0	—		11	0
Granada	2021–22	La Liga	4	0	2	0	—		—		6	0
Granada	Total		13	0	13	0	1	0	0	0	27	0
Cartagena	2022–23	Segunda División	36	0	0	0	—		—		36	0
Las Palmas	2023–24	La Liga	2	0	3	0	—		—		5	0
Real Oviedo	2024–25	Segunda División	41	0	0	0	—		4	0	45	0
Real Oviedo	2025–26	La Liga	36	0	0	0	—		—		36	0
Real Oviedo	Total		77	0	0	0	—		4	0	81	0
Career total			243	0	16	0	1	0	18	0	278	0
