= Julián Araujo =

Mexican-American soccer player (born 2001)

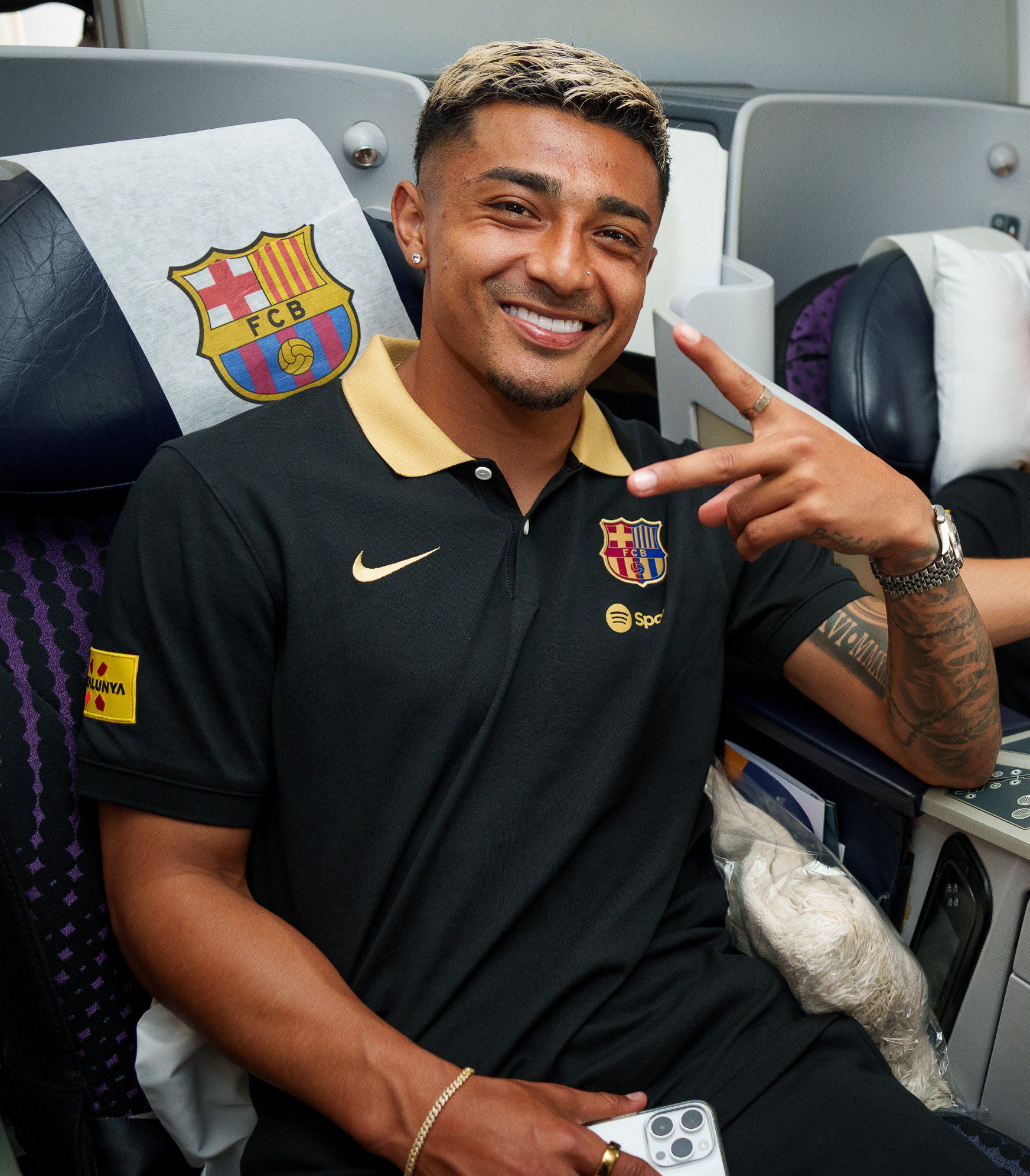
- Araujo with Barcelona in 2024

Personal information
- Full name: Julián Vicente Araujo Zúñiga
- Date of birth: 13 August 2001 (age 25)
- Place of birth: Lompoc, California, U.S.
- Height: 1.76 m (5 ft 9 in)
- Position: Right-back

Team information
- Current team: Bournemouth
- Number: 2

Youth career
- 2013–2015: Central Coast Condors
- 2015–2016: Santa Barbara Soccer Club
- 2016–2017: Lompoc High School
- 2017–2018: Barça Residency Academy
- 2018–2019: LA Galaxy

Senior career*
Years	Team	Apps	(Gls)
2018–2019	LA Galaxy II	2	(0)
2019–2023	LA Galaxy	100	(1)
2023–2024	Barcelona B	0	(0)
2023–2024	→ Las Palmas (loan)	25	(1)
2024–	Bournemouth	12	(0)
2026	→ Celtic (loan)	10	(1)

International career^{‡}
2017	United States U16	4	(0)
2017–2018	United States U18	6	(0)
2018	United States U19	2	(0)
2018	United States U20	2	(0)
2019–2021	United States U23	6	(0)
2020	United States	1	(0)
2021–	Mexico	16	(0)
Medal record
Men's football
Representing Mexico
CONCACAF Gold Cup
Winner	2023 United States–Canada
Winner	2025 United States–Canada
CONCACAF Nations League
Runner-up	2024 United States
Third place	2023 United States
Representing United States
CONCACAF U-20 Championship
Winner	2018 United States
- * Club domestic league appearances and goals as of 4 March 2026 ‡ National team caps and goals as of 2 July 2025

Julián Vicente Araujo Zúñiga (born 13 August 2001) is a professional soccer player who plays as a right-back for Premier League club Bournemouth. Born in the United States, he represents the Mexico national team.

== Youth ==
Araujo was born in Lompoc, California, and is of Mexican descent. He attended Lompoc High School for two years, then left home and joined Barça Residency Academy in Casa Grande, Arizona in 2017.

In March 2017, Araujo had committed to playing college soccer at the University of California, Santa Barbara from 2018 onward.

== Club career ==
=== LA Galaxy II ===
Araujo made his professional debut in a 2–2 draw with Seattle Sounders 2 on 4 October 2018, coming on as an 88th-minute substitute for Nate Shultz.

=== LA Galaxy ===
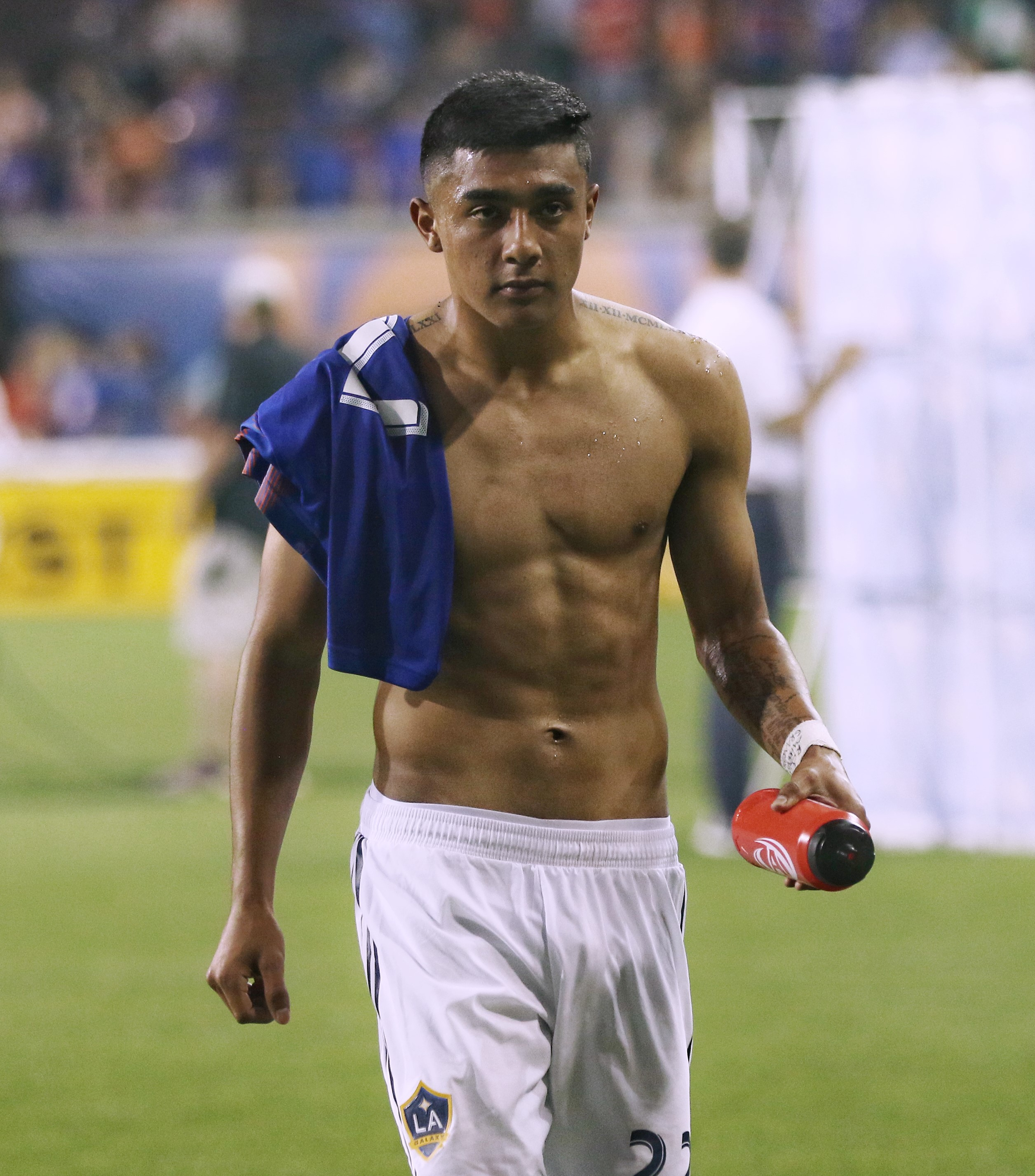
Araujo with LA Galaxy in 2019

On 1 March 2019, LA Galaxy acquired Araujo after trading $50,000 of Targeted Allocation Money to Colorado Rapids to gain the first spot in the Waivers Order.

Araujo made 108 total appearances with the Galaxy, scoring once in the regular season and again in the playoffs. He became a regular starter beginning in 2019 and finished 2021 and 2022 as the team's defender of the year.

=== Barcelona ===
On 1 February 2023, Barcelona and LA Galaxy agreed on a transfer for Araujo. The paperwork, however, was delivered 18 seconds late, and the deal was left in limbo after FIFA rejected the transfer but the Court of Arbitration for Sport overruled. Ultimately, by 17 February Araujo was transferred to Barcelona.

==== Loan to Las Palmas ====
On 1 August 2023, Araujo was loaned to La Liga side Las Palmas for the entire 2023–24 season.

On 31 October, Araujo scored his first goal with the club in a 3–0 away win against Manacor to advance in the second round of the Copa del Rey. On 1 December, he scored his first league goal with the club, scoring the first goal in their 2–0 win over Getafe. On 7 January 2024, during a Copa del Rey match against Tenerife, Araujo picked up a red card for a violent conduct on Nacho Martínez after Nacho Martínez had gone down in the penalty area. On 10 January, it was announced that he would serve a four-match suspension. He returned a month later on 10 February, coming on in stoppage-time for Marvin Park in their 2–0 win over Valencia.

=== AFC Bournemouth ===
On 13 August 2024, Araujo joined Premier League team AFC Bournemouth on a five-year deal. He made his debut on 17 August in a 1–1 away draw against Nottingham Forest.

==== Loan to Celtic ====
On 2 January 2026, Araujo joined Scottish Premiership club Celtic on loan for the remainder of the 2025–26 season.

Araujo scored his first Celtic goal on 15 February when he netted a last minute winner against Kilmarnock at Rugby Park. In the 97th minute, he swept the ball home with his weaker left foot, then celebrated by jumping into the stand with the Celtic fans and linking arms.

== International career ==
=== United States ===
Araujo was eligible to play for the United States and Mexico.

After an injury to Ayo Akinola, Araujo was named to the 2019 FIFA U-20 World Cup squad to represent the United States under-20.

Araujo was called into the United States national soccer team by Gregg Berhalter for the January 2020 camp, but did not make an official match appearance. He was called up again in December 2020 for a game against El Salvador, in which he made his senior level debut. Araujo was named to the final 20-player United States under-23 roster for the 2020 CONCACAF Men's Olympic Qualifying Championship in March 2021.

On 18 June 2021, Araujo was named to the preliminary 59-player USMNT roster for the 2021 CONCACAF Gold Cup but was left off the final roster on 1 July 2021. Berhalter cited Araujo's dual citizenship and unwillingness to become cap-tied to the USMNT.

=== Mexico ===
On 13 August 2021, sports media in Mexico reported that Araujo himself had filed and submitted the one-time switch to FIFA to join Mexico. As of 4 October 2021 FIFA officially approved Araujo's case.

On 27 November 2021, Araujo was included in the Mexico national football team call-up by Gerardo Martino for a friendly match against Chile set to take place on 8 December. He was given a starting berth in Mexico's 2–2 draw, playing the full 90 minutes. In making his debut, Araujo became the third player in the history of the Mexico–United States rivalry in having represented both national teams alongside Martín Vásquez and Edgar Castillo.

In the summer of 2023, Araujo was part of Mexico national team that reached 3rd-place finish at the 2023 CONCACAF Nations League Finals and won the 2023 CONCACAF Gold Cup. He also won the latter tournament in 2025.

== Career statistics ==
=== Club ===
As of match played 8 March 2026

Appearances and goals by club, season and competition
Club	Season	League			National cup (Note: Includes U.S. Open Cup, Copa del Rey, Scottish Cup)		League cup (Note: Includes EFL Cup)		Continental		Other		Total	
Club	Season	Division	Apps	Goals	Apps	Goals	Apps	Goals	Apps	Goals	Apps	Goals	Apps	Goals
LA Galaxy II	2018	USL	2	0	—		—		—		—		2	0
LA Galaxy	2019	MLS	18	0	1	0	—		—		1 (Note: Appearance in Leagues Cup)	0	20	0
LA Galaxy	2020	MLS	17	1	—		—		—		—		17	1
LA Galaxy	2021	MLS	32	0	—		—		—		—		32	0
LA Galaxy	2022	MLS	33	0	4	0	—		—		2 (Note: Appearances in MLS Cup playoffs)	1	39	1
LA Galaxy	Total		100	1	5	0	—		—		3	1	108	2
Barcelona	2022–23	La Liga	0	0	0	0	—		0	0	0	0	0	0
Las Palmas (loan)	2023–24	La Liga	25	1	3	1	—		—		—		28	2
Bournemouth	2024–25	Premier League	12	0	0	0	1	0	—		—		13	0
Bournemouth	2025–26	Premier League	0	0	—		1	0	—		—		1	0
Bournemouth	2026–27	Premier League	0	0	0	0	0	0	0	0	—		0	0
Bournemouth	Total		12	0	0	0	2	0	0	0	—		14	0
Celtic (loan)	2025–26	Scottish Premiership	10	1	2	0	—		1 (Note: Appearance in UEFA Europa League)	0	—		13	1
Career total			149	3	10	1	2	0	1	0	3	1	165	5

=== International ===
As of match played 2 July 2025

Appearances and goals by national team and year
National team	Year	Apps	Goals
Mexico	2021	1	0
Mexico	2022	2	0
Mexico	2023	9	0
Mexico	2024	2	0
Mexico	2025	2	0
Total		16	0

== Honors ==
Celtic

- Scottish Premiership: 2025–26
- Scottish Cup: 2025–26

United States

- CONCACAF U-20 Championship: 2018

Mexico

- CONCACAF Gold Cup: 2023, 2025

Individual

- LA Galaxy Young Player of the Year: 2020
- LA Galaxy Defender of the Year: 2020, 2021
- MLS All-Star: 2021, 2022
- IFFHS CONCACAF Best XI: 2021 (substitute)
- IFFHS CONCACAF Youth Best XI: 2021
