= Máximo Perrone =

Argentine footballer (born 2003)

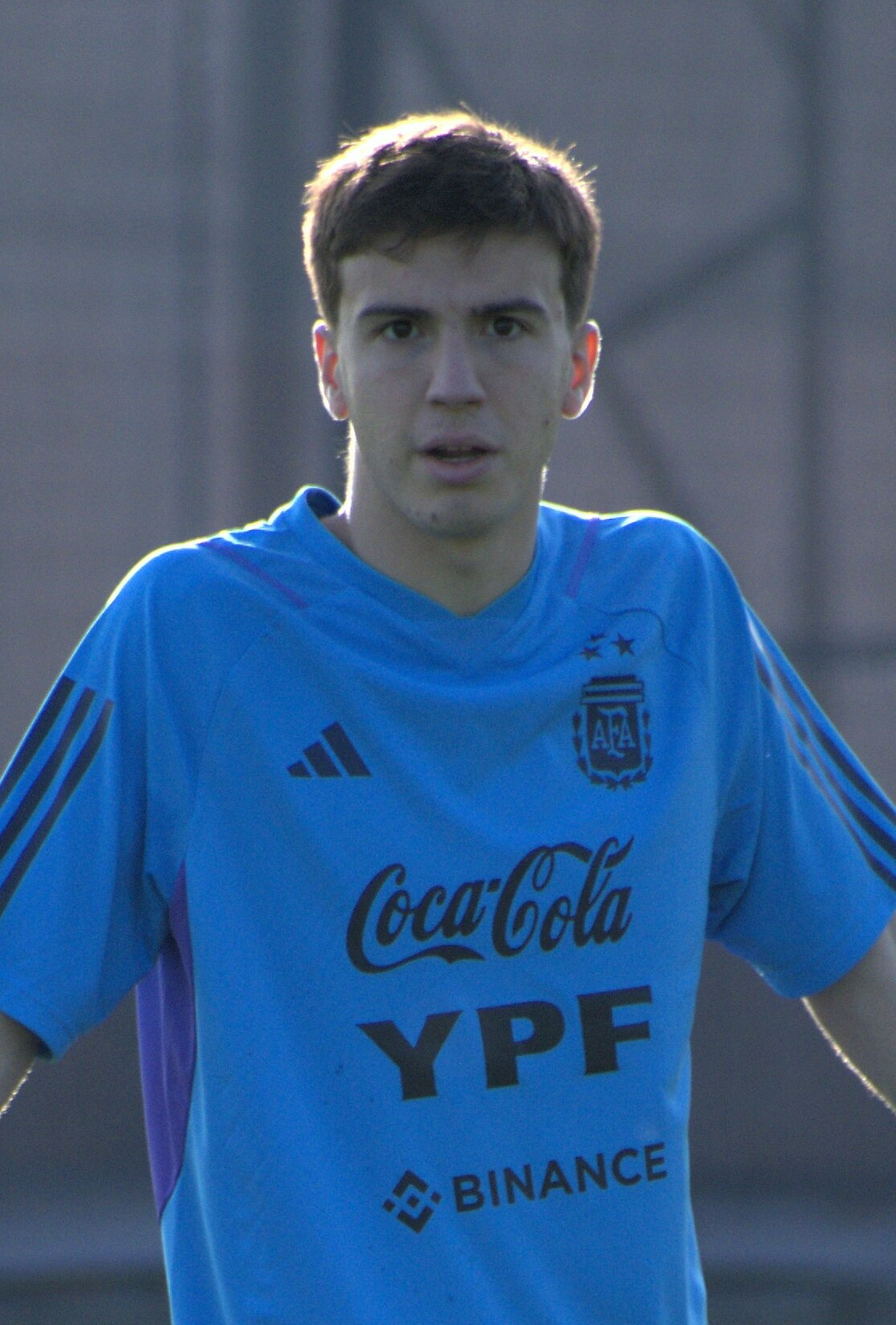
- Perrone with Argentina U20 in 2023

Personal information
- Full name: Máximo Perrone
- Date of birth: 7 January 2003 (age 23)
- Place of birth: Buenos Aires, Argentina
- Height: 1.77 m (5 ft 10 in)
- Position: Defensive midfielder

Team information
- Current team: Como
- Number: 5

Youth career
- 2009–2022: Vélez Sarsfield

Senior career*
Years	Team	Apps	(Gls)
2022–2023	Vélez Sarsfield	15	(2)
2023–2025	Manchester City	1	(0)
2023–2024	→ Las Palmas (loan)	29	(0)
2024–2025	→ Como (loan)	26	(0)
2025–	Como	48	(3)

International career^{‡}
2019–2020	Argentina U16	7	(0)
2022–2023	Argentina U20	7	(2)
2025–	Argentina	2	(0)
- * Club domestic league appearances and goals as of 18:43, 21 November 2026 (UTC) ‡ National team caps and goals as of 31 March 2026

Máximo Perrone (born 7 January 2003) is an Argentine professional footballer who plays as a defensive midfielder for Serie A club Como and the Argentina national team.

== Club career ==
=== Vélez Sarsfield ===
Perrone made his professional debut for Vélez Sarsfield on 6 March 2022 against Estudiantes.

On 18 May, he scored his first senior goal, which was a 94th-minute winner against Nacional in the Copa Libertadores group stage.

=== Manchester City ===
On 23 January 2023, Perrone signed a contract for five-and-a-half year with Manchester City for around £8m, and joined the club following the end of the 2023 South American U-20 Championship.

On 25 February, he made his Premier League debut in a 4–1 away victory against Bournemouth, replacing Erling Haaland in the 72nd minute. He made his only other competitive appearance for City in a 3-0 FA Cup fifth victory at Bristol City, replacing Bernardo Silva in the 88th minute.

On 23 August, Perrone joined La Liga club Las Palmas on loan for the rest of the 2023–24 season.

=== Como ===
On 25 August 2024, Serie A club Como announced the signing of Perrone on loan for the 2024–25 season with an option for the loan to be extended.

On 18 July 2025, Perrone joined Como permanently, signing a four-year contract.

== International career ==
Born in Argentina, Perrone is of Italian descent. He represented Argentina at under-16 and under-20 levels.

He was part of the squad that was sent to the 2023 South American U-20 Championship. Perrone scored in Argentina's group stage opener against Paraguay, which ended as a 2–1 defeat. With only one victory from the remaining three matches, Argentina failed to reach the knockout stages of the tournament for the first time since 2013.

Perrone was once again included in Argentina's squad for the 2023 FIFA U-20 World Cup, where he scored the third goal in a 3–0 group stage victory against Guatemala. Argentina were eliminated in the round of 16, losing 2–0 against Nigeria, with Perrone being left on the bench.

In March 2023, Perrone received his first call-up to the Argentina senior national team by coach Lionel Scaloni for two friendly matches against Panama and Curaçao. He debuted in a friendly match against Angola on 14 November 2025.

== Career statistics ==
=== Club ===
As of match played 21 November 2026

Appearances and goals by club, season and competition
Club	Season	League			National cup (Note: Includes Copa Argentina, FA Cup, Copa del Rey, Coppa Italia)		Continental		Total	
Club	Season	Division	Apps	Goals	Apps	Goals	Apps	Goals	Apps	Goals
Vélez Sarsfield	2022	Argentine Primera División	22	2	1	0	10 (Note: Appearances in Copa Libertadores)	1	33	3
Manchester City	2022–23	Premier League	1	0	1	0	0	0	2	0
Las Palmas (loan)	2023–24	La Liga	29	0	2	0	—		31	0
Como (loan)	2024–25	Serie A	26	0	0	0	—		26	0
Como	2025–26	Serie A	36	3	5	0	—		41	3
Como	2026–27	Serie A	12	0	0	0	4 (Note: Appearances in UEFA Champions League)	1	16	1
Como	Como total		74	3	5	0	4	1	83	4
Career total			126	5	9	0	14	2	149	7

== Honours ==
Manchester City

- UEFA Champions League: 2022–23
- UEFA Super Cup: 2023
