= Marc Cardona =

Spanish footballer (born 1995)

Personal information
- Full name: Marc Cardona Rovira
- Date of birth: 8 July 1995 (age 31)
- Place of birth: Lleida, Spain
- Height: 1.82 m (6 ft 0 in)
- Position: Striker

Team information
- Current team: Bangkok United

Youth career
- Sanluqueño
- Xerez
- 2011–2014: San Benito

Senior career*
Years	Team	Apps	(Gls)
2014–2015	Sanluqueño B	24	(11)
2014–2016	Sanluqueño	43	(20)
2016–2019	Barcelona B	54	(22)
2016	Barcelona	0	(0)
2018–2019	→ Eibar (loan)	17	(3)
2019–2022	Osasuna	22	(1)
2020–2021	→ Mallorca (loan)	13	(2)
2021–2022	→ Go Ahead Eagles (loan)	22	(2)
2022–2026	Las Palmas	79	(11)
2026	Andorra	9	(3)
2026–	Bangkok United	0	(0)

International career^{‡}
2019–	Catalonia	2	(0)
- * Club domestic league appearances and goals as of 9 June 2026 ‡ National team caps and goals as of 25 March 2019

Marc Cardona Rovira (born 8 July 1995) is a Spanish professional footballer who plays as a striker for Thai League 1 club Bangkok United.

== Club career ==
Born in Lleida, Catalonia, Cardona moved to the Province of Cádiz at early age, and represented Atlético Sanluqueño CF, Xerez CD and San Benito CF as a youth. In 2014, he returned to Sanluqueño, and made his debut for the club on 24 August 2014 by coming on as a second half substitute in a 3–0 Tercera División away loss against CD Alcalá.

Cardona appeared rarely for the first team during his first season, playing regularly with the reserves in Primera Andaluza. In his second, he was a key player in Sanluqueño's promotion to Segunda División B, scoring a career-best 20 goals; highlights included a hat-trick in a 5–1 home rout of Sevilla FC C on 24 January 2016.

On 29 June 2016, Cardona joined FC Barcelona, and was immediately assigned to the reserves in the third division. He made his debut for Barça B on 20 August, scoring a hat-trick in a 3–1 home win against Atlético Saguntino.

Cardona helped the B-side achieve promotion to Segunda División in 2017 by scoring 15 goals. He played his first match in the second division on 19 August of that year, starting and scoring his team's second in a 2–1 away win against Real Valladolid.

On 19 July 2018, Cardona was loaned to La Liga side SD Eibar for one year, with a buyout clause. On 31 August he played and scored the equalizer in a 2–1 home win against Real Sociedad.

On 25 June 2019, Cardona joined fellow top tier side CA Osasuna until 2023. On 5 October of the following year, he moved to second division side RCD Mallorca on loan for one year.

On 29 July 2021, Cardona moved abroad for the first time in his career, after agreeing to a one-year loan deal with Dutch Eredivisie side Go Ahead Eagles.

On 7 July 2022, Cardona signed a two-year contract with UD Las Palmas in the second level. On 20 June of the following year, after scoring seven goals during the campaign as his side achieved promotion to the top tier, he renewed his contract until 2026.

On 21 January 2026, Cardona terminated his link with the Amarillos, and signed a six-month deal with fellow second division side FC Andorra just hours later.

== Career statistics ==
As of match played 11 December 2023

Appearances and goals by club, season and competition
Club	Season	League			National cup		Continental		Other		Total	
Club	Season	Division	Apps	Goals	Apps	Goals	Apps	Goals	Apps	Goals	Apps	Goals
Sanluqueño B	2014–15	Primera Andaluza	24	11	—		—		—		24	11
Sanluqueño	2014–15	Tercera División	7	1	—		—		—		7	1
Sanluqueño	2015–16	Tercera División	36	19	—		—		5 (Note: Appearance(s) in Tercera División play-offs)	1	41	20
Sanluqueño	Total		43	20	0	0	0	0	5	1	48	21
Barcelona B	2016–17	Segunda División B	25	15	—		—		6 (Note: Appearance(s) in Segunda División B play-offs)	2	31	17
Barcelona B	2017–18	Segunda División	29	7	—		—		—		29	7
Barcelona B	Total		54	22	0	0	0	0	6	2	60	24
Barcelona	2016–17	La Liga	0	0	1	0	1 (Note: Appearance(s) in UEFA Champions League)	0	0	0	2	0
Eibar (loan)	2018–19	La Liga	17	3	2	0	—		—		19	3
Osasuna	2019-20	La Liga	19	1	3	1	—		—		22	2
Osasuna	2020–21	La Liga	3	0	0	0	—		—		3	0
Osasuna	Total		22	1	3	1	0	0	0	0	25	2
Mallorca (loan)	2020–21	Segunda División	13	2	0	0	—		—		13	2
Go Ahead Eagles (loan)	2021–22	Eredivisie	22	2	3	0	—		—		2	0
Las Palmas	2022–23	Segunda División	36	7	1	0	—		—		39	7
Las Palmas	2023–24	La Liga	10	2	1	0	—		—		11	2
Las Palmas	Total		46	9	2	0	0	0	0	0	50	9
Career total			241	70	11	1	1	0	11	3	264	74

== Honours ==
Barcelona

- Copa del Rey: 2016–17
