= Álvaro Valles =

Spanish footballer (born 1997)

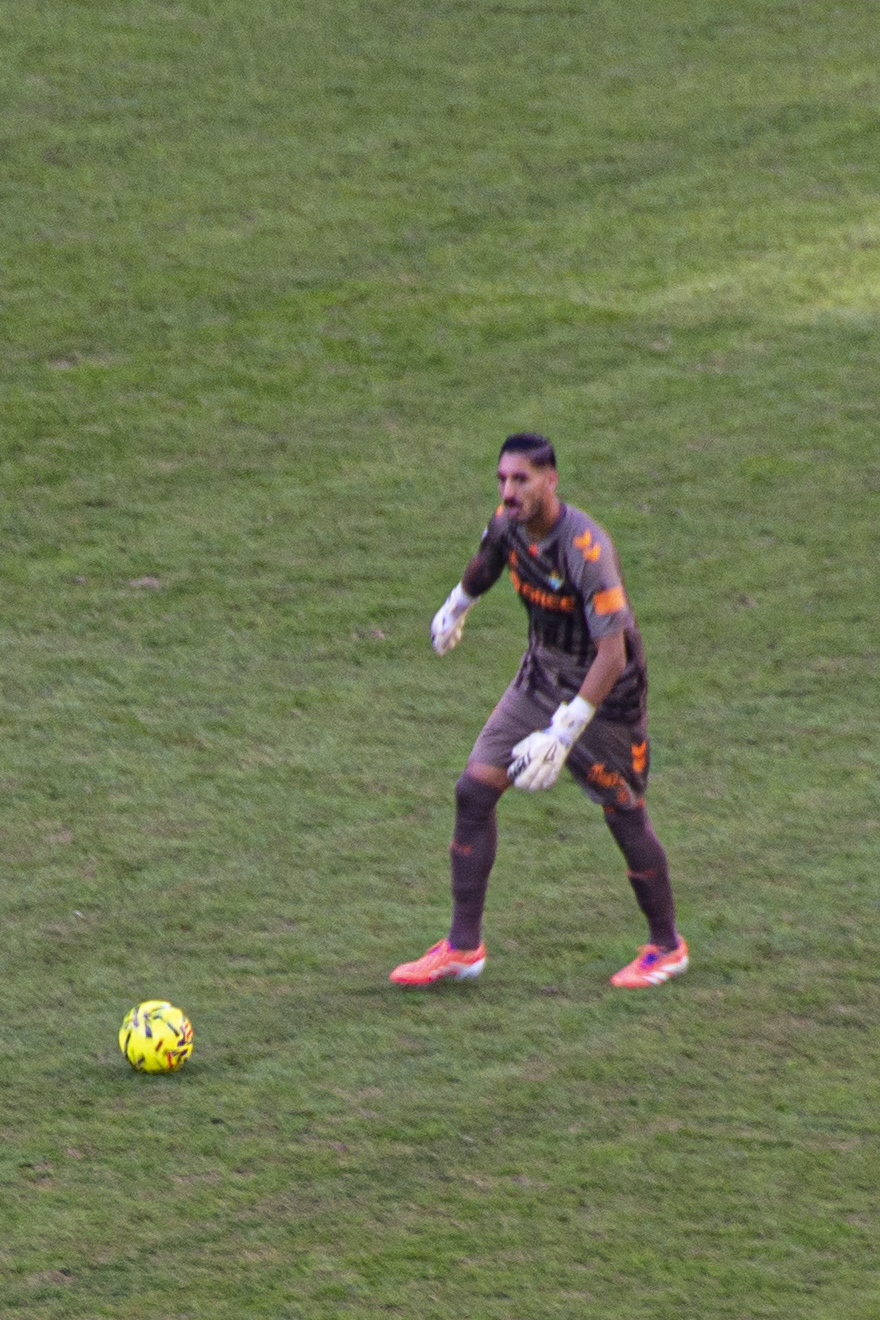
- Valles with Betis in 2025

Personal information
- Full name: Álvaro Valles Rosa
- Date of birth: 25 July 1997 (age 29)
- Place of birth: La Rinconada, Spain
- Height: 1.92 m (6 ft 4 in)
- Position: Goalkeeper

Team information
- Current team: Betis
- Number: 1

Youth career
- Círculo Don Bosco
- 2014–2016: Betis

Senior career*
Years	Team	Apps	(Gls)
2016–2018	Betis B	10	(0)
2017–2018	→ Gerena (loan)	34	(0)
2018–2019	Las Palmas B	7	(0)
2019–2025	Las Palmas	132	(0)
2025–	Betis	41	(0)
- * Club domestic league appearances and goals as of 21 November 2026

Álvaro Valles Rosa (born 25 July 1997) is a Spanish professional footballer who plays as a goalkeeper for La Liga club Real Betis.

== Career ==
=== Early career ===
Born in La Rinconada, Seville, Andalusia, Valles finished his formation with Real Betis. He made his senior debut with the reserves on 16 October 2016, starting in a 3–0 Tercera División away win against CD Guadalcacín.

On 6 September 2017, after being rarely used, Valles was loaned to CD Gerena of the fourth division, for one year. On 10 July of the following year, he moved to another reserve team, UD Las Palmas Atlético of the Segunda División B.

=== Las Palmas ===
Valles made his first-team debut for the Canarians on 13 October 2019, playing the full 90 minutes in a 3–0 home defeat of Deportivo de La Coruña in the Segunda División. He subsequently established himself as a starter for the main squad under Pepe Mel, overtaking fellow youth graduate Josep Martínez and Raúl Fernández, and renewed his contract until 2024 on 17 June 2022.

Valles contributed with 34 appearances during the 2022–23 season as the club achieved promotion to La Liga. He made his debut in the top tier of Spanish football on 12 August 2023, starting in a 1–1 home draw against RCD Mallorca.

Demoted to third-choice ahead of the 2024–25 campaign after the arrivals of Jasper Cillessen and Dinko Horkaš, Valles terminated his link with the Amarillos on 10 February 2025.

=== Betis ===
On 17 June 2025, Valles returned to Betis on a five-year contract, now being a first team member.

== Career statistics ==
As of match played 21 November 2026

Appearances and goals by club, season and competition
Club	Season	League			Copa del Rey		Europe		Other		Total	
Club	Season	Division	Apps	Goals	Apps	Goals	Apps	Goals	Apps	Goals	Apps	Goals
Gerena (loan)	2017–18	Tercera División	34	0	0	0	—		—		34	0
Las Palmas B	2018–19	Segunda División B	7	0	—		—		—		7	0
Las Palmas	2019–20	Segunda División	21	0	0	0	—		—		21	0
Las Palmas	2020–21	Segunda División	26	0	2	0	—		—		28	0
Las Palmas	2021–22	Segunda División	14	0	2	0	—		2 (Note: Appearances in Segunda División promotion play-offs)	0	18	0
Las Palmas	2022–23	Segunda División	34	0	0	0	—		—		34	0
Las Palmas	2023–24	La Liga	37	0	0	0	—		—		37	0
Las Palmas	2024–25	La Liga	0	0	0	0	—		—		0	0
Las Palmas	Total		132	0	4	0	—		2	0	138	0
Betis	2025–26	La Liga	28	0	0	0	5 (Note: Appearances in UEFA Europa League)	0	—		33	0
Betis	2026–27	La Liga	13	0	0	0	4 (Note: Appearances in UEFA Champions League)	0	—		17	0
Betis	Total		41	0	0	0	9	0	—		50	0
Career total			214	0	4	0	9	0	2	0	229	0

== Honours ==
Individual

- La Liga Save of the Month: September 2026
