= Iván Gil =

Spanish footballer

Personal information
- Full name: Iván Gil Calero
- Date of birth: 18 January 2000 (age 26)
- Place of birth: Sant Boi de Llobregat, Spain
- Height: 1.68 m (5 ft 6 in)
- Position: Midfielder

Team information
- Current team: Eibar
- Number: 21

Youth career
- Sector Montserratina
- Gavà
- Marianao Poblet
- 2014–2019: Espanyol

Senior career*
Years	Team	Apps	(Gls)
2019–2021	Espanyol B	49	(3)
2021–2024	Andorra	94	(16)
2024–2026	Las Palmas	26	(2)
2025	→ Eibar (loan)	11	(0)
2026–	Eibar	0	(0)
- * Club domestic league appearances and goals as of 3 June 2026

Iván Gil Calero (born 18 January 2000) is a Spanish professional footballer who plays as a midfielder for SD Eibar.

== Club career ==
=== Espanyol ===
Born in Sant Boi de Llobregat, Barcelona, Catalonia, Gil joined RCD Espanyol's youth setup in 2014, after representing Marianao Poblet, CF Gavà and UD Sector Montserratina. He made his senior debut with the reserves on 25 August 2019, coming on as a late substitute for Nico Melamed in a 2–0 Segunda División B home win over FC Andorra.

Gil scored his first senior goals on 10 November 2019, netting a brace in a 3–1 home success over SD Ejea. On 20 December, he renewed his contract until 2022.

=== Andorra ===
On 20 July 2021, Gil terminated his contract with the Pericos, and moved to Primera División RFEF side FC Andorra three days later. He was regularly used during his first season, scoring six goals in 29 appearances overall as the club achieved a first-ever promotion to Segunda División.

Gil made his professional debut on 15 August 2022, replacing Sergio Molina in a 1–0 away win over Real Oviedo. He scored his first professional goal on 4 September, netting the winner in a 1–0 home success over Granada CF.

=== Las Palmas ===
On 23 June 2024, Gil agreed to a three-year contract with La Liga side UD Las Palmas. The following 3 January, after just two cup appearances, he returned to the second division after being loaned out to SD Eibar.

=== Eibar return ===
On 8 July 2026, Gil returned to Eibar on a permanent three-year deal.
