= Álex Suárez (footballer, born 1993) =

Spanish footballer

Personal information
- Full name: José Alejandro Suárez Suárez
- Date of birth: 18 March 1993 (age 33)
- Place of birth: Las Palmas, Spain
- Height: 1.80 m (5 ft 11 in)
- Position: Defender

Team information
- Current team: Las Palmas
- Number: 4

Youth career
- Daniel Carnevali
- Las Palmas

Senior career*
Years	Team	Apps	(Gls)
2013–2014	Acodetti		
2014–2016	Villa Santa Brígida	57	(6)
2016–2019	Las Palmas B	101	(10)
2019–	Las Palmas	153	(4)
- * Club domestic league appearances and goals as of 27 May 2025

José Alexander Suárez Suárez (born 18 March 1993), known as Álex Suárez, is a Spanish professional footballer who plays for UD Las Palmas. Mainly a central defender, he can also play as a right back.

== Career ==
Born in Las Palmas, Canary Islands, Suárez finished his formation with UD Las Palmas. In 2013, he joined Acodetti CF in the regional leagues, and made his senior debut during the campaign.

In 2014, Suárez moved to Tercera División side UD Villa de Santa Brígida, being regularly used during his spell at the club. In August 2016, he returned to his former club Las Palmas, being assigned to the reserves also in the fourth division.

On 18 July 2017, after achieving promotion to Segunda División B with the Amarillos, Suárez renewed his contract, and subsequently became team captain. On 28 June 2019, he was definitely promoted to the main squad in Segunda División, after agreeing to a new two-year deal.

Suárez made his professional debut at the age of 26 on 27 September 2019, coming on as a late substitute for Slavoljub Srnić in a 3–2 home success over Albacete Balompié. He became a regular starter in the 2020–21 season, and scored his first goal as a professional on 31 October 2020, in a 2–1 home loss against Real Oviedo.

After being rarely used in the 2021–22 campaign, Suárez was converted into a right back by manager Francisco García Pimienta ahead of the 2022–23 season, and helped the club to achieve promotion to La Liga at the end of it. He made his debut in the category on 12 August 2023, starting in a 1–1 home draw against RCD Mallorca.

Suárez scored his first goal in the main category of Spanish football on 10 February 2024, netting the opener in a 2–0 home win over Valencia CF. On 10 July of the following year, after suffering relegation, he renewed his contract until 2028.

== Personal life ==
Suárez's uncle Alexis was also a footballer and a central defender. Also groomed in Las Palmas, he spent the most of his career representing CD Tenerife and Levante UD.

== Honors ==
Villa Santa Brígida

- Tercera División: 2015–16
