= Juanma Herzog =

Spanish footballer (born 2004)

Personal information
- Full name: Juan Manuel Herzog González
- Date of birth: 13 May 2004 (age 22)
- Place of birth: Santa Cruz de Tenerife, Spain
- Height: 1.86 m (6 ft 1 in)
- Position: Centre-back

Team information
- Current team: Las Palmas
- Number: 15

Youth career
- 2021–2023: Las Palmas

Senior career*
Years	Team	Apps	(Gls)
2023–2024	Las Palmas B	23	(0)
2023–	Las Palmas	42	(2)

International career^{‡}
2025–	Spain U21	4	(0)
- * Club domestic league appearances and goals as of 3 June 2026 ‡ National team caps and goals as of 14:21, 20 June 2025 (UTC)

Juan Manuel "Juanma" Herzog González (born 13 May 2004) is a Spanish professional footballer who plays for UD Las Palmas as a centre-back.

== Career ==
Born in Santa Cruz de Tenerife, Canary Islands, Herzog was an UD Las Palmas youth graduate. After making the 2023 pre-season with the first team, he made his senior debut with the reserves on 10 September of that year, starting in a 2–1 Tercera Federación home win over UD Tamaraceite.

Herzog made his first team debut on 31 October 2023, starting in a 3–0 away win over CE Manacor, for the season's Copa del Rey. He made his professional debut the following 7 January, playing the full 90 minutes in a 2–0 loss at rivals CD Tenerife, also for the national cup.

Herzog made his La Liga debut on 13 January 2024, starting and scoring Las Palmas' second in a 3–0 home win over Villarreal CF.

== Personal life ==
Herzog is of German descent through his paternal grandfather.
