= Iván Cédric =

Cameroonian footballer (born 2001)

Personal information
- Full name: Iván Cédric Bikoue Embolo
- Date of birth: 22 December 2001 (age 24)
- Place of birth: Madrid, Spain
- Height: 1.85 m (6 ft 1 in)
- Position: Forward

Team information
- Current team: Alanyaspor
- Number: 19

Youth career
- 2013–2016: Ciudad de Móstoles
- 2013–2016: Móstoles
- 2016–2017: EMF Aluche
- 2017–2018: Humanes
- 2018–2019: Los Yébenes SB
- 2019–2020: Alcorcón

Senior career*
Years	Team	Apps	(Gls)
2018–2019	Los Yébenes SB	2	(0)
2020–2022	Alcorcón B	25	(10)
2021–2022	→ Toledo (loan)	29	(8)
2022–2024	Valladolid B	34	(13)
2023–2024	Valladolid	12	(2)
2024–2026	Las Palmas	0	(0)
2024–2025	→ Barcelona B (loan)	29	(8)
2025–2026	→ Vanspor (loan)	33	(15)
2026	Vanspor	0	(0)
2026–	Alanyaspor	3	(0)

International career^{‡}
2022	Cameroon U23	1	(0)
2026–	Cameroon	1	(0)
- * Club domestic league appearances and goals as of 10 October 2026 ‡ National team caps and goals as of 3 October 2026

Iván Cédric Bikoue Embolo (born 22 December 2001), known as Iván Cédric or just Cédric, is a footballer who plays as a forward for Turkish club Alanyaspor. Born in Spain, he represents the Cameroon national team.

== Early life ==
Cédric's parents both left Cameroon and moved to Madrid in 1993, to continue their studies. They met each other in the Spanish capital, with Cédric later being born in the city.

== Club career ==
=== Early career ===
Cédric represented the youth sides of CD Ciudad de Móstoles, CD Móstoles URJC, EMF Aluche, CD Humanes and CD Los Yébenes San Bruno, and made his first team debut with the latter on 19 May 2019, coming on as a second-half substitute in a 2–0 Preferente de Madrid home win over CF Fuenlabrada B. In July, he moved to AD Alcorcón and returned to youth football.

Cédric was promoted to Alkor's B-team ahead of the 2020–21 Tercera División season, and scored his first senior goals on 29 November 2020, netting a brace in a 3–0 home win over AD Parla. On 19 August 2021, after being the side's top goalscorer with 10 goals, he was loaned to Segunda División RFEF side CD Toledo, for one year.

=== Valladolid ===
On 28 July 2022, Cédric signed a two-year contract with Real Valladolid, being initially assigned to the reserves also in the fourth division. He impressed during the 2023 pre-season with the first team, and made his professional debut on 11 August of that year, starting and scoring the opener in a 2–0 Segunda División home win over Sporting de Gijón.

In December 2023, despite being regularly used in the first team, Cédric was demoted to the B-team after not renewing his contract.

=== Las Palmas ===
On 24 June 2024, Cédric signed a two-year deal with UD Las Palmas, with an option for a further two years. On 30 August, however, he was loaned to FC Barcelona Atlètic in Primera Federación, for one year.

On 1 August 2025, Cédric left Spain for the first time in his career, and joined Turkish side Vanspor FK on loan for one year.

=== Alanyaspor ===
On 21 August 2026, Cédric signed a four-year contract with Alanyaspor.

== International career ==
On 3 October 2026, Cédric made his debut for the Cameroon national team in a friendly against the Ivory Coast.
