= Marvin Park =

Spanish footballer (born 2000)

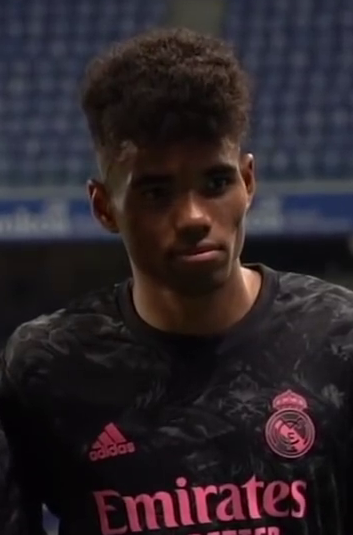
- Marvin with Real Madrid in 2020

Personal information
- Full name: Marvin Olawale Akinlabi Park
- Date of birth: 3 July 2000 (age 26)
- Place of birth: Palma de Mallorca, Spain
- Height: 1.75 m (5 ft 9 in)
- Position: Right-back

Team information
- Current team: Las Palmas
- Number: 2

Youth career
- 2006–2009: Ciutat de Palma
- 2009–2012: Tranmere Rovers
- 2012–2013: Ciutat de Palma
- 2013–2014: La Salle
- 2014–2016: Penya Arrabal
- 2016–2019: Real Madrid

Senior career*
Years	Team	Apps	(Gls)
2019–2022	Real Madrid B	59	(4)
2020–2024	Real Madrid	4	(0)
2022–2024	→ Las Palmas (loan)	55	(1)
2024–	Las Palmas	54	(1)

International career^{‡}
2019	Spain U19	1	(0)
- * Club domestic league appearances and goals as of 3 June 2026 ‡ National team caps and goals as of 20:45, 12 October 2022 (UTC)

Marvin Olawale Akinlabi Park (Spanish: [ˈmaɾβim ˈpaɾk]; Korean: 마르빈 파르크; born 3 July 2000), known as Marvin Park or simply Marvin, is a Spanish professional footballer who plays for La Liga club Las Palmas. Mainly a right back, he can also play as a right winger.

== Club career ==
=== Real Madrid ===
Born in Palma de Mallorca, Balearic Islands, Marvin spent his early career with Sporting Ciutat de Palma (two stints), English club Tranmere Rovers FC, where he spent three years, and back in Spain with SD La Salle and AD Penya Arrabal before joining Real Madrid's La Fábrica in 2016. He made his senior debut with the reserves on 25 August 2019, coming on as a second-half substitute for Miguel Baeza in a 1–1 Segunda División B away draw against Las Rozas CF.

Marvin scored his first senior goal on 26 October 2019, netting the opener in a 1–2 home loss against Racing de Ferrol. He ended his first senior campaign with three goals in 26 appearances, as the season was curtailed by the COVID-19 pandemic, while also helping the under-20s win the UEFA Youth League.

Marvin made his first team – and La Liga – debut on 20 September 2020, replacing Rodrygo in a 0–0 away draw against Real Sociedad.

=== Las Palmas ===
In August 2022, Marvin was loaned to UD Las Palmas in Segunda División. He scored his first professional goal on 22 August, netting his team's fourth in a 4–0 away routing of Málaga CF, and featured in 24 matches during the campaign as the club achieved promotion to the top tier.

On 18 August 2023, Marvin returned to Las Palmas on loan for the entire 2023–24 season with an option to make the move permanent. On 20 June 2024, the club exercised his buyout clause, and he signed a permanent four-year deal.

== International career ==
Marvin was born in Spain to a Nigerian father and a Korean mother. He represented the Spain U19s once in a friendly 3–0 loss against Italy U19s on 16 January 2019.

== Career statistics ==
=== Club ===
As of 20 December 2023

Appearances and goals by club, season and competition
Club	Season	League			Cup		Continental		Other		Total	
Club	Season	Division	Apps	Goals	Apps	Goals	Apps	Goals	Apps	Goals	Apps	Goals
Real Madrid Castilla	2019–20	Segunda División B	26	3	—		—		0	0	26	3
Real Madrid Castilla	2020–21	Segunda División B	11	1	—		—		0	0	11	1
Real Madrid Castilla	2021–22	Primera División RFEF	22	0	—		—		0	0	22	0
Real Madrid Castilla	Total		59	4	0	0	0	0	0	0	59	4
Real Madrid	2020–21	La Liga	4	0	0	0	0	0	0	0	4	0
Las Palmas (loan)	2022–23	Segunda División	24	1	0	0	—		0	0	24	1
Las Palmas (loan)	2023–24	La Liga	14	0	1	0	—		0	0	15	0
Las Palmas (loan)	Total		38	1	1	0	0	0	0	0	39	1
Career total			101	5	1	0	0	0	0	0	102	5

== Honours ==
Real Madrid (youth)

- UEFA Youth League: 2019–20
