= La Liga Goal of the Month =

Spanish Football award

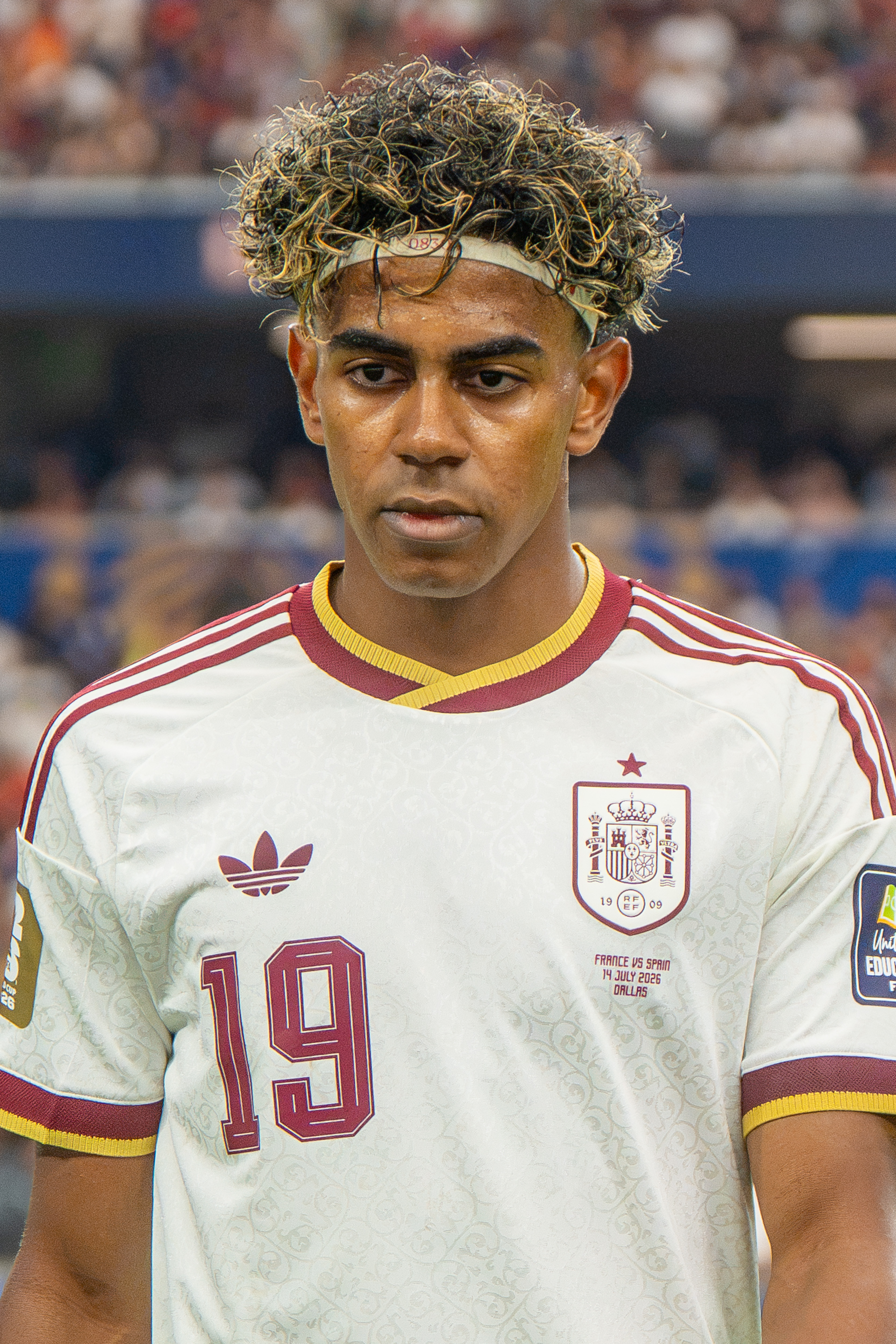
Lamine Yamal has won a joint-record two Goal of the Month awards.

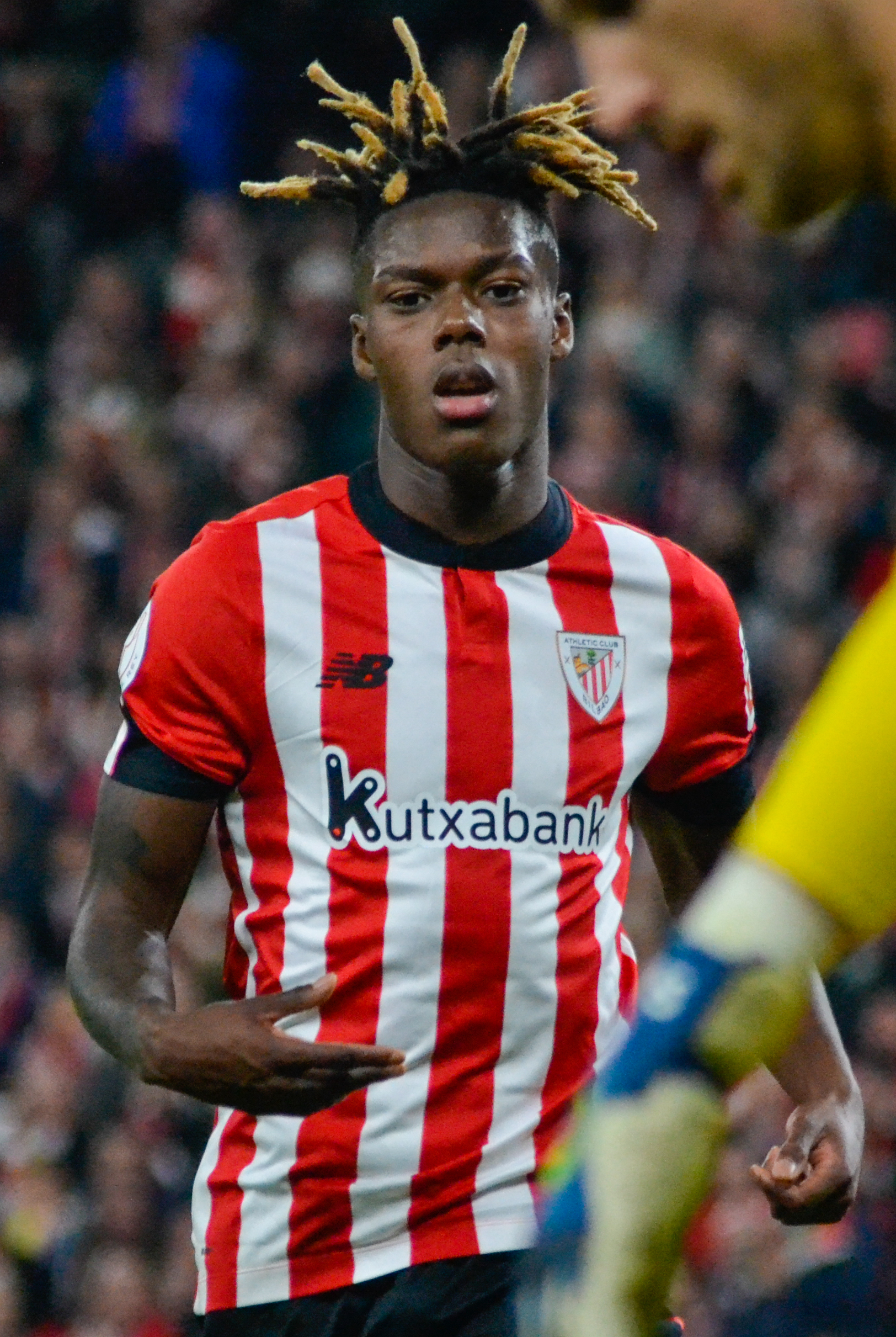
Nico Williams has won a joint-record two Goal of the Month awards.

João Cancelo has won a joint-record two Goal of the Month awards.

The La Liga Goal of the Month is an association football award that recognises the player who is deemed to have scored the best La Liga goal each month of the season from August to May. The award was introduced for the 2023–24 season.

== Winners ==
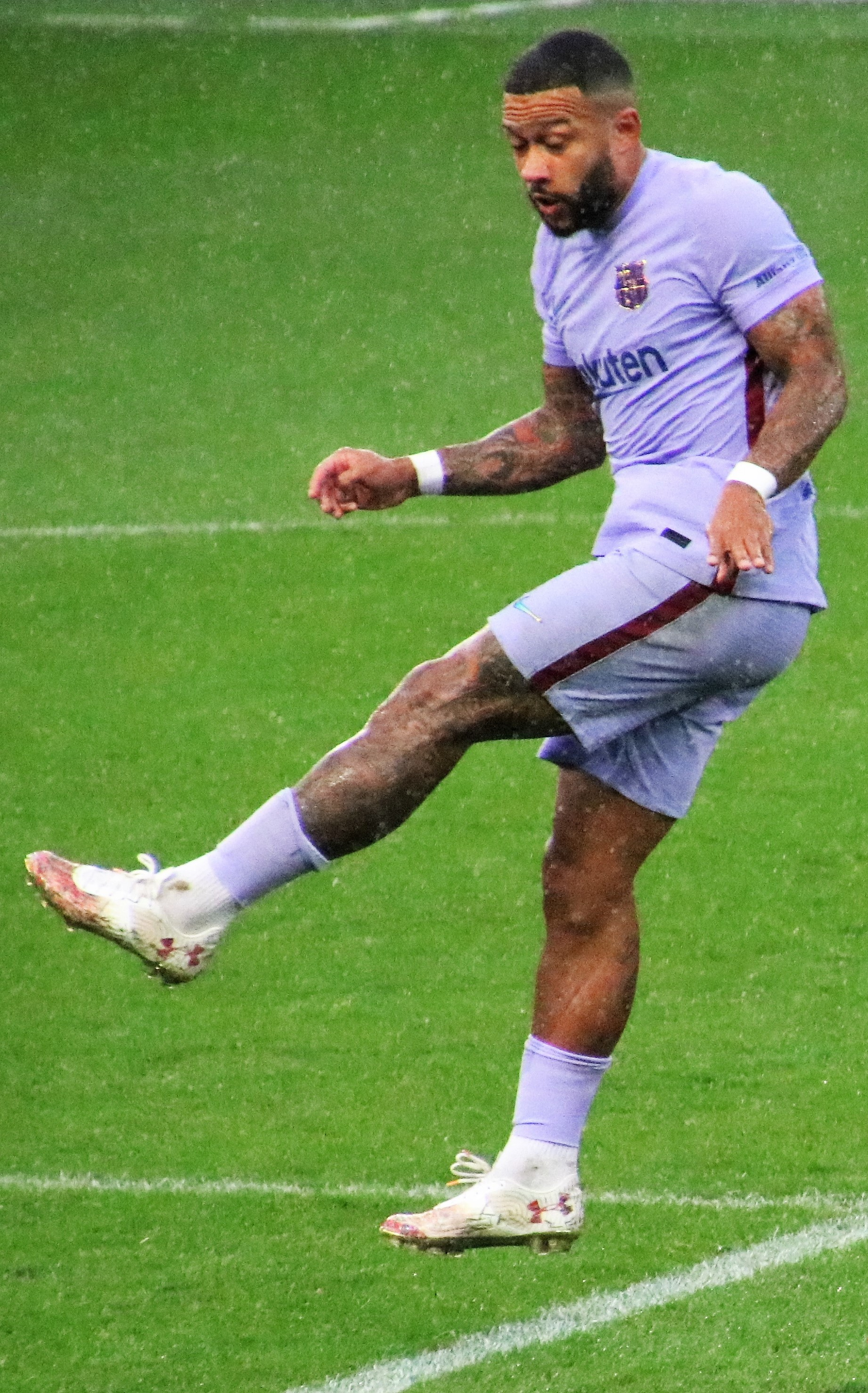
Memphis Depay won the first Goal of the Month award in August 2023.

Key
Player (X)	Name of the player and number of times they had won the award at that point (if more than one).
Italics	Home team.
	La Liga Goal of the Season.

Month	Year (Note: Each year is linked to an article on the particular season associated with the month of that year.)	Player	Pos.	Club	Score (Note: The score at the time of the goal. Player's club's score listed first.)	Opponent	Date	Ref.
August	2023	(Netherlands) Memphis Depay	FW	Atlético Madrid	2–1	Granada	14 August 2023	
September	2023	(Portugal) João Cancelo	DF	Barcelona	5–0	Real Betis	16 September 2023	
October	2023	(Equatorial Guinea) Saúl Coco	DF	Las Palmas	1–0	Villarreal	8 October 2023	
November	2023	(Croatia) Ivan Rakitić	MF	Sevilla	1–1	Real Betis	12 November 2023	
December	2023	(Spain) Aitor Ruibal	FW	Real Betis	1–1	Real Madrid	9 December 2023	
January	2024	(Spain) Jesús Areso	DF	Osasuna	3–2	Getafe	21 January 2024	
February	2024	(Brazil) Vinícius Júnior	FW	Real Madrid	1–0	Girona	10 February 2024	
March	2024	(Spain) Lamine Yamal	FW	Barcelona	1–0	Mallorca	8 March 2024	
April	2024	(Portugal) João Félix	FW	Barcelona	1–0	Cádiz	13 April 2024	
August	2024	(Spain) Juan Cruz	FW	Leganés	1–0	Las Palmas	25 August 2024	
September	2024	(Ghana) Abdul Mumin	DF	Rayo Vallecano	1–1	Osasuna	16 September 2024	
October	2024	(Croatia) Luka Sučić	MF	Real Sociedad	1–1	Atlético Madrid	6 October 2024	
November	2024	(Morocco) Munir	FW	Leganés	3–4	Girona	2 November 2024	
December	2024	(Czech Republic) Ladislav Krejčí	DF	2–2	Villarreal	1 December 2024		
January	2025	(Spain) Javi Puado	FW	Espanyol	1–0	Valladolid	17 January 2025	
February	2025	(France) Romain Perraud	DF	Real Betis	2–1	Athletic Bilbao	2 February 2025	
March	2025	(Nigeria) Umar Sadiq	FW	Valencia	3–3	Osasuna	2 March 2025	
April	2025	(Spain) Nico Williams	FW	Athletic Bilbao	2–1	Rayo Vallecano	13 April 2025	
August	2025	(Spain) Pedri	MF	Barcelona	1–2	Levante	23 August 2025	
September	2025	(Brazil) Éder Militão	DF	Real Madrid	1–0	Espanyol	20 September 2025	
October	2025	(Portugal) Samú Costa	MF	Mallorca	1–1	Athletic Bilbao	4 October 2025	
November	2025	(Spain) Nico Williams (2)	FW	Athletic Bilbao	1–0	Oviedo	9 November 2025	
December	2025	(Spain) Héctor Fort	DF	Elche	1–0	Rayo Vallecano	22 December 2025	
January	2026	(Spain) Gonzalo García	FW	Real Madrid	2–0	Real Betis	4 January 2026	
February	2026	(Belgium) Largie Ramazani	FW	Valencia	1–0	Levante	15 February 2026	
March	2026	(Turkey) Arda Güler	MF	Real Madrid	4–1	Elche	14 March 2026	
April	2026	(England) Marcus Rashford	FW	Barcelona	4–1	Espanyol	11 April 2026	
August	2026	(South Korea) Lee Kang-in	FW	Atlético Madrid	1–0	Málaga	19 August 2026	
September	2026	(Portugal) João Cancelo (2)	DF	Barcelona	1–0	Racing Santander	16 September 2026	
October	2026	(Spain) Lamine Yamal (2)	FW	Barcelona	1–0	Real Betis	17 October 2026	

== Multiple winners ==
As of November 2026

The following table lists the number of awards won by players who have won at least two Player of the Month awards.

Players in bold are still active in La Liga.

Rank	Player	Wins
1st	(Spain) **Nico Williams**	2
1st	(Portugal) **João Cancelo**	2
1st	(Spain) **Lamine Yamal**	2

== Awards won by club ==
As of November 2026

Club	Players	Wins
Barcelona	5	7
Real Madrid	4	4
Atlético Madrid	2	2
Leganés	2	2
Real Betis	2	2
Valencia	2	2
Athletic Bilbao	1	2
Elche	1	1
Espanyol	1	1
Girona	1	1
Las Palmas	1	1
Mallorca	1	1
Osasuna	1	1
Rayo Vallecano	1	1
Real Sociedad	1	1
Sevilla	1	1

== Awards won by nationality ==
As of November 2026

Nationality	Players	Wins
Spain	9	11
Portugal	3	4
Brazil	2	2
Croatia	2	2
Belgium	1	1
Czech Republic	1	1
England	1	1
Equatorial Guinea	1	1
France	1	1
Ghana	1	1
Morocco	1	1
Netherlands	1	1
Nigeria	1	1
South Korea	1	1
Turkey	1	1

== Awards won by position ==
As of November 2026

Position	Players	Wins
Forward	14	16
Defender	8	9
Midfielder	5	5
Goalkeeper	0	0

== See also ==
- La Liga Player of the Month
- La Liga U23 Player of the Month
- La Liga Manager of the Month
- La Liga Save of the Month
- La Liga Awards
