= La Liga Player of the Month =

Spanish association football award

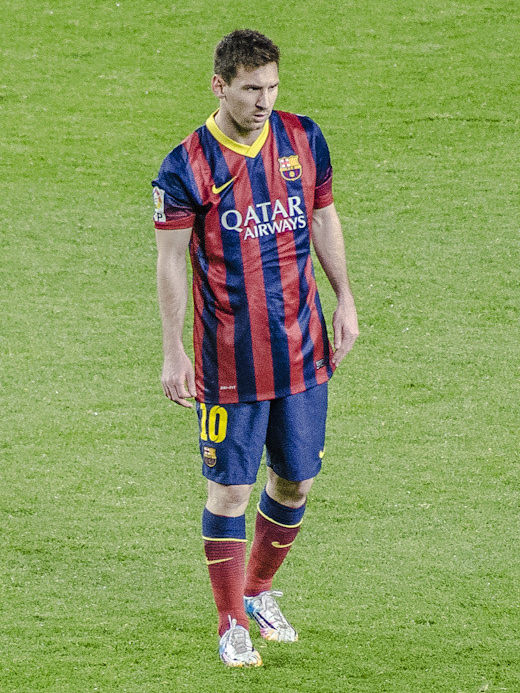
Lionel Messi has won a joint-record eight Player of the Month awards.

The Player of the Month is an association football award that recognises the best La Liga player each month of the season.

As of October 2026, the latest winner is Real Madrid forward Kylian Mbappé.

== Winners ==
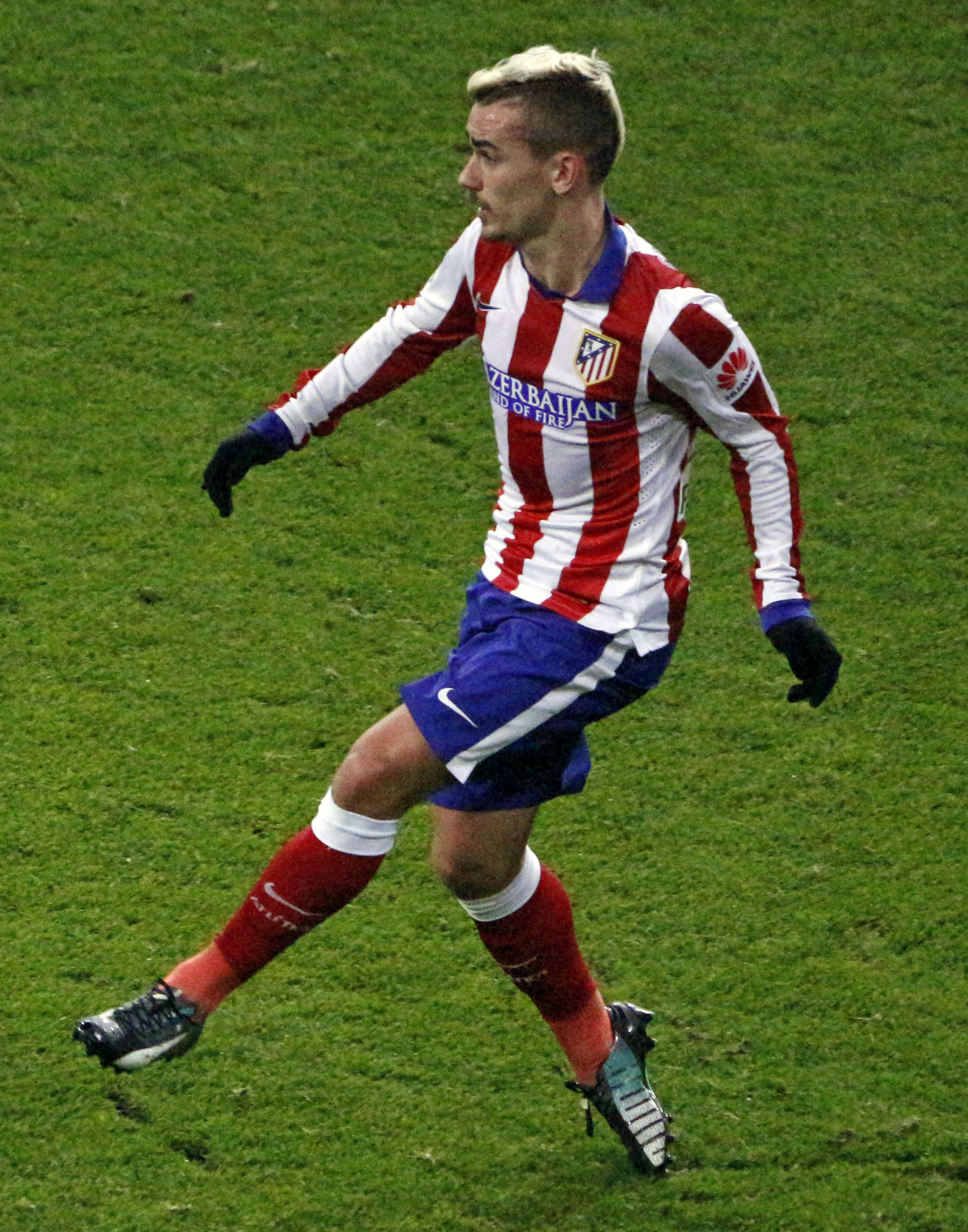
Antoine Griezmann has been named Player of the Month on a joint-record eight occasions.

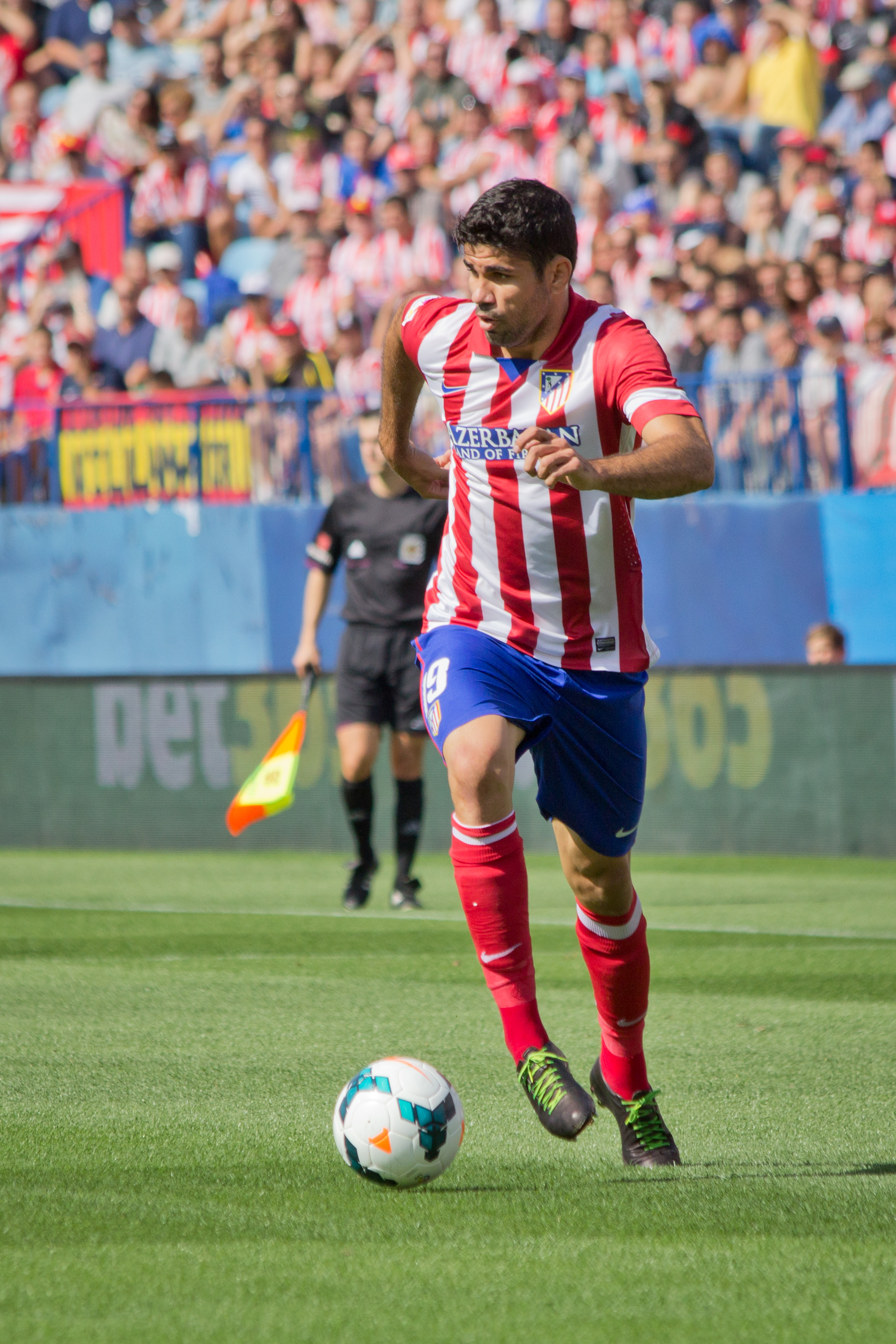
Diego Costa won the first Player of the Month award in September 2013.

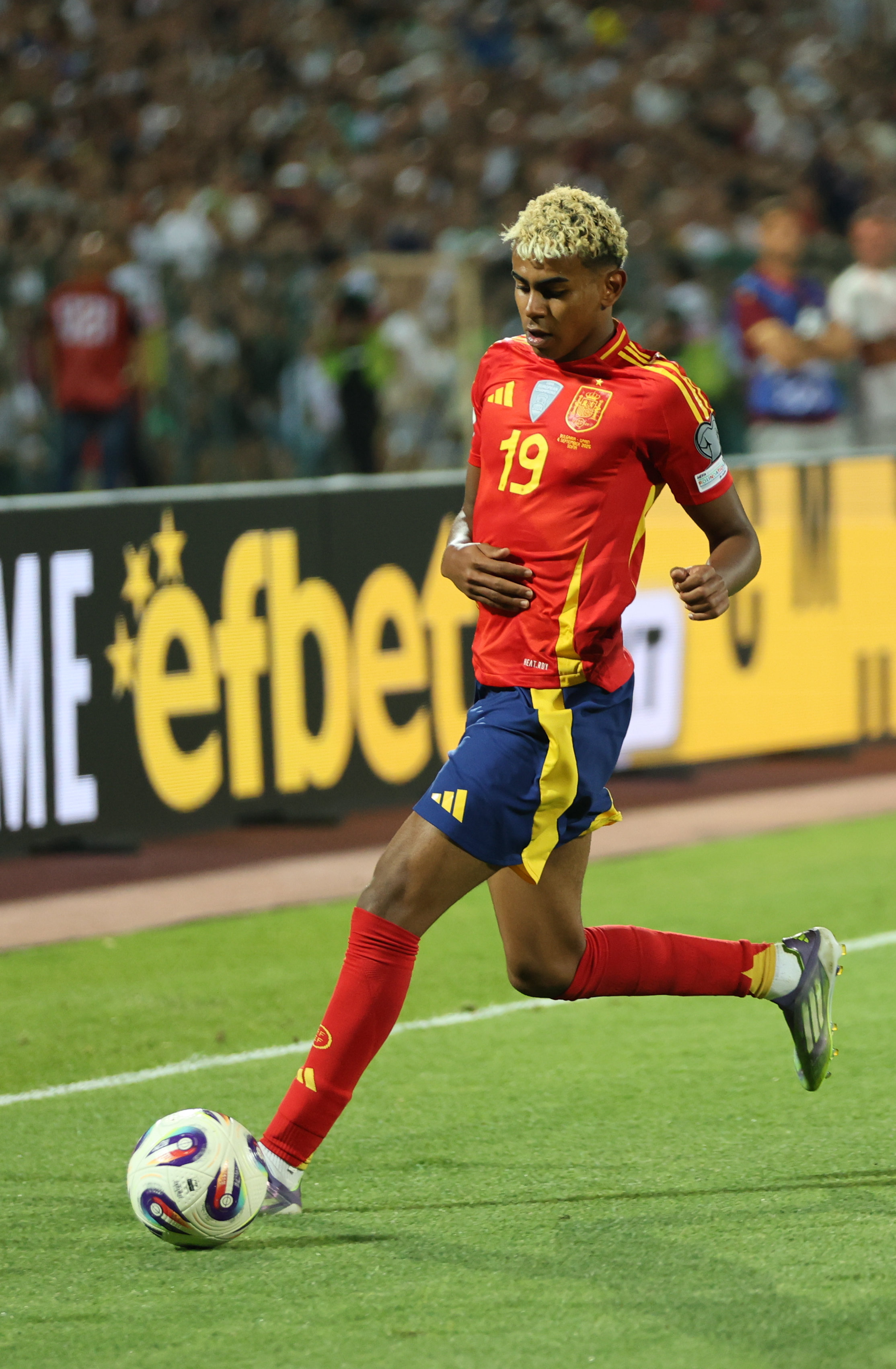
Lamine Yamal was the first player to win three Player of the Month awards in one season.

Month	Year (Note: Each year is linked to an article on the particular season associated with the month of that year.)	Player	Nationality	Pos.	Club	Ref.
September	2013	Diego Costa	Brazil (Note: Represented Spain at international level after the award was given.)	FW	Atlético Madrid	
October	2013	Koke	Spain	MF	Atlético Madrid	
November	2013	Cristiano Ronaldo	Portugal	FW	Real Madrid	
December	2013	Carlos Vela	Mexico	FW	Real Sociedad	
January	2014	Ivan Rakitić	Croatia	MF	Sevilla	
February	2014	Rafinha	Brazil	MF	Celta Vigo	
March	2014	Keylor Navas	Costa Rica	GK	Levante	
April	2014	Diego Godín	Uruguay	DF	Atlético Madrid	
May	2014	Diego Godín	Uruguay	DF	Atlético Madrid	
September	2014	Nolito	Spain	FW	Celta Vigo	
October	2014	Karim Benzema	France	FW	Real Madrid	
November	2014	Carlos Vela	Mexico	FW	Real Sociedad	
December	2014	Luciano Vietto	Argentina	FW	Villarreal	
January	2015	Antoine Griezmann	France	FW	Atlético Madrid	
February	2015	Alberto Bueno	Spain	FW	Rayo Vallecano	
March	2015	Vitolo	Spain	FW	Sevilla	
April	2015	Antoine Griezmann	France	FW	Atlético Madrid	
May	2015	Cristiano Ronaldo	Portugal	FW	Real Madrid	
September	2015	Nolito	Spain	FW	Celta Vigo	
October	2015	Borja Bastón	Spain	FW	Eibar	
November	2015	Neymar	Brazil	FW	Barcelona	
December	2015	Lucas Pérez	Spain	FW	Deportivo La Coruña	
January	2016	Lionel Messi	Argentina	FW	Barcelona	
February	2016	Miku	Venezuela	FW	Rayo Vallecano	
March	2016	Aritz Aduriz	Spain	FW	Athletic Bilbao	
April	2016	Koke	Spain	MF	Atlético Madrid	
May	2016	Luis Suárez	Uruguay	FW	Barcelona	
August	2016	Jon Ander Serantes	Spain	GK	Leganés	
September	2016	Antoine Griezmann	France	FW	Atlético Madrid	
October	2016	Iago Aspas	Spain	FW	Celta Vigo	
November	2016	Diego López	Spain	GK	Espanyol	
December	2016	Florin Andone	Romania	FW	Deportivo La Coruña	
January	2017	Steven Nzonzi	France	MF	Sevilla	
February	2017	Sergi Enrich	Spain	FW	Eibar	
March	2017	Antoine Griezmann	France	FW	Atlético Madrid	
April	2017	Lionel Messi	Argentina	FW	Barcelona	
May	2017	Cristiano Ronaldo	Portugal	FW	Real Madrid	
September	2017	Simone Zaza	Italy	FW	Valencia	
October	2017	Cédric Bakambu	DR Congo	FW	Villarreal	
November	2017	Iago Aspas	Spain	FW	Celta Vigo	
December	2017	Luis Suárez	Uruguay	FW	Barcelona	
January	2018	Aritz Aduriz	Spain	FW	Athletic Bilbao	
February	2018	Antoine Griezmann	France	FW	Atlético Madrid	
March	2018	Rodrigo	Spain	FW	Valencia	
April	2018	Lionel Messi	Argentina	FW	Barcelona	
September	2018	Lionel Messi	Argentina	FW	Barcelona	
October	2018	Luis Suárez	Uruguay	FW	Barcelona	
November	2018	Tomáš Vaclík	Czech Republic	GK	Sevilla	
December	2018	Antoine Griezmann	France	FW	Atlético Madrid	
January	2019	Iñaki Williams	Spain (Note: Represented Ghana at international level after the award was given.)	FW	Athletic Bilbao	
February	2019	Jaime Mata	Spain	FW	Getafe	
March	2019	Lionel Messi	Argentina	FW	Barcelona	
April	2019	Iago Aspas	Spain	FW	Celta Vigo	
September	2019	Martin Ødegaard	Norway	FW	Real Sociedad	
October	2019	Karl Toko Ekambi	Cameroon	FW	Villarreal	
November	2019	Lionel Messi	Argentina	FW	Barcelona	
December	2019	Luis Suárez	Uruguay	FW	Barcelona	
January	2020	Thibaut Courtois	Belgium	GK	Real Madrid	
February	2020	Lionel Messi	Argentina	FW	Barcelona	
June	2020	Karim Benzema	France	FW	Real Madrid	
September	2020	Ansu Fati	Spain	FW	Barcelona	
October	2020	Mikel Oyarzabal	Spain	FW	Real Sociedad	
November	2020	João Félix	Portugal	FW	Atlético Madrid	
December	2020	Iago Aspas	Spain	FW	Celta Vigo	
January	2021	Youssef En-Nesyri	Morocco	FW	Sevilla	
February	2021	Lionel Messi	Argentina	FW	Barcelona	
March	2021	Karim Benzema	France	FW	Real Madrid	
April	2021	Fernando	Brazil	MF	Sevilla	
May	2021	Jan Oblak	Slovenia	GK	Atlético Madrid	
September	2021	Karim Benzema	France	FW	Real Madrid	
October	2021	Robin Le Normand	France	DF	Real Sociedad	
November	2021	Vinícius Júnior	Brazil	FW	Real Madrid	
December	2021	Juanmi	Spain	FW	Real Betis	
January	2022	Ángel Correa	Argentina	FW	Atlético Madrid	
February	2022	Thibaut Courtois	Belgium	GK	Real Madrid	
March	2022	João Félix	Portugal	FW	Atlético Madrid	
April	2022	Karim Benzema	France	FW	Real Madrid	
May	2022	Vedat Muriqi	Kosovo	FW	Mallorca	
August	2022	Borja Iglesias	Spain	FW	Real Betis	
September	2022	Federico Valverde	Uruguay	MF	Real Madrid	
October	2022	Robert Lewandowski	Poland	FW	Barcelona	
January	2023	Alexander Sørloth	Norway	FW	Real Sociedad	
February	2023	Gabri Veiga	Spain	MF	Celta Vigo	
March	2023	Antoine Griezmann	France	FW	Atlético Madrid	
April	2023	Youssef En-Nesyri	Morocco	FW	Sevilla	
May	2023	Nicolas Jackson	Senegal	FW	Villarreal	
August	2023	Jude Bellingham	England	MF	Real Madrid	
September	2023	Takefusa Kubo	Japan	MF	Real Sociedad	
October	2023	Jude Bellingham	England	MF	Real Madrid	
November	2023	Antoine Griezmann	France	FW	Atlético Madrid	
December	2023	Artem Dovbyk	Ukraine	FW	Girona	
January	2024	Kirian Rodríguez	Spain	MF	Las Palmas	
February	2024	Robert Lewandowski	Poland	FW	Barcelona	
March	2024	Vinícius Júnior	Brazil	FW	Real Madrid	
April	2024	Isco	Spain	MF	Real Betis	
August	2024	Raphinha	Brazil	FW	Barcelona	
September	2024	Lamine Yamal	Spain	FW	Barcelona	
October	2024	Robert Lewandowski	Poland	FW	Barcelona	
November	2024	Vinícius Júnior	Brazil	FW	Real Madrid	
December	2024	Jude Bellingham	England	MF	Real Madrid	
January	2025	Kylian Mbappé	France	FW	Real Madrid	
February	2025	Oihan Sancet	Spain	MF	Athletic Bilbao	
March	2025	Isco	Spain	MF	Real Betis	
April	2025	Pedri	Spain	MF	Barcelona	
August	2025	Nicolas Pépé	Ivory Coast	FW	Villarreal	
September	2025	Kylian Mbappé	France	FW	Real Madrid	
October	2025	Kylian Mbappé	France	FW	Real Madrid	
November	2025	Lamine Yamal	Spain	FW	Barcelona	
December	2025	Lamine Yamal	Spain	FW	Barcelona	
January	2026	Vedat Muriqi	Kosovo	FW	Mallorca	
February	2026	Georges Mikautadze	Georgia	FW	Villarreal	
March	2026	Carlos Espí	Spain	FW	Levante	
April	2026	Lamine Yamal	Spain	FW	Barcelona	
August	2026	Raphinha	Brazil	FW	Barcelona	
September	2026	Raphinha	Brazil	FW	Barcelona	
October	2026	Kylian Mbappé	France	FW	Real Madrid	

== Multiple winners ==
The following table lists the number of awards won by players who have won at least two Player of the Month awards.

Players in bold are still active in La Liga.

Rank	Player	Wins
1st	(France) Antoine Griezmann	8
1st	(Argentina) Lionel Messi	8
3rd	(France) Karim Benzema	5
4th	(Spain) **Iago Aspas**	4
4th	(France) **Kylian Mbappé**	4
4th	(Uruguay) Luis Suárez	4
4th	(Spain) **Lamine Yamal**	4
8th	(England) **Jude Bellingham**	3
8th	(Brazil) **Vinícius Júnior**	3
8th	(Poland) Robert Lewandowski	3
8th	(Brazil) **Raphinha**	3
8th	(Portugal) Cristiano Ronaldo	3
13th	(Spain) Aritz Aduriz	2
13th	(Belgium) **Thibaut Courtois**	2
13th	(Morocco) Youssef En-Nesyri	2
13th	(Portugal) João Félix	2
13th	(Uruguay) Diego Godín	2
13th	(Spain) **Isco**	2
13th	(Spain) **Koke**	2
13th	(Kosovo) Vedat Muriqi	2
13th	(Spain) Nolito	2
13th	(Mexico) Carlos Vela	2

== Awards won by nationality ==
As of October 2026

Nationality	Players	Wins
Spain	25	35
France	5	19
Brazil	6	10
Argentina	3	10
Uruguay	3	7
Portugal	2	5
England	1	3
Poland	1	3
Norway	2	2
Belgium	1	2
Kosovo	1	2
Mexico	1	2
Morocco	1	2
Cameroon	1	1
Costa Rica	1	1
Croatia	1	1
Czech Republic	1	1
DR Congo	1	1
Georgia	1	1
Italy	1	1
Ivory Coast	1	1
Japan	1	1
Romania	1	1
Senegal	1	1
Slovenia	1	1
Ukraine	1	1
Venezuela	1	1

== Awards won by club ==
As of October 2026

Club	Players	Wins
Barcelona	8	25
Real Madrid	7	21
Atlético Madrid	7	17
Celta Vigo	4	8
Sevilla	6	7
Real Sociedad	6	7
Villarreal	6	6
Athletic Bilbao	3	4
Real Betis	3	4
Deportivo La Coruña	2	2
Eibar	2	2
Rayo Vallecano	2	2
Valencia	2	2
Levante	2	2
Mallorca	1	2
Espanyol	1	1
Getafe	1	1
Girona	1	1
Las Palmas	1	1
Leganés	1	1

== Awards won by position ==
As of October 2026

Position	Players	Wins
Forward	45	92
Midfielder	13	16
Goalkeeper	6	7
Defender	2	3

== See also ==
- La Liga U23 Player of the Month
- La Liga Manager of the Month
- La Liga Goal of the Month
- La Liga Save of the Month
- La Liga Awards
