= La Liga U23 Player of the Month =

Spanish association football award

Lamine Yamal and Alberto Moleiro have won a joint-record three U23 Player of the Month awards.

The U23 Player of the Month is an association football award that recognizes the best La Liga player under the age of 23 each month of the season. The award was established after the rebranding of the league for the 2023–24 season.

== Winners ==
Key
Player (X)	Name of the player and number of times they had won the award at that point (if more than one).

Month	Year (Note: Each year is linked to an article on the particular season associated with the month of that year.)	Player	Nationality	Pos.	Club	Ref.
August	2023	Lamine Yamal	Spain	FW	Barcelona	
September	2023	Javi Guerra	Spain	MF	Valencia	
October	2023	Bryan Zaragoza	Spain	MF	Granada	
November	2023	Rodrygo	Brazil	FW	Real Madrid	
December	2023	Yan Couto	Brazil	DF	Girona	
January	2024	Savinho	Brazil	FW	Girona	
February	2024	Johnny Cardoso	United States	MF	Real Betis	
March	2024	Pau Cubarsí	Spain	DF	Barcelona	
April	2024	Miguel Gutiérrez	Spain	DF	Girona	
August	2024	Lamine Yamal (2)	Spain	FW	Barcelona	
September	2024	Alberto Moleiro	Spain	MF	Las Palmas	
October	2024	Pedri	Spain	MF	Barcelona	
November	2024	Fábio Silva	Portugal	MF	Las Palmas	
December	2024	Arda Güler	Turkey	MF	Real Madrid	
January	2025	Jude Bellingham	England	MF	Real Madrid	
February	2025	Lamine Yamal (3)	Spain	FW	Barcelona	
March	2025	Diego López	Spain	FW	Valencia	
April	2025	Fábio Silva (2)	Portugal	MF	Las Palmas	
August	2025	Adrián Liso	Spain	FW	Getafe	
September	2025	Arda Güler (2)	Turkey	MF	Real Madrid	
October	2025	Alberto Moleiro (2)	Spain	MF	Villarreal	
November	2025	Alberto Moleiro (3)	Spain	MF	Villarreal	
December	2025	Williot Swedberg	Sweden	FW	Celta Vigo	
January	2026	Vitor Reis	Brazil	DF	Girona	
February	2026	Víctor Muñoz	Spain	FW	Osasuna	
March	2026	Víctor Muñoz (2)	Spain	FW	Osasuna	
April	2026	Pau Cubarsí (2)	Spain	DF	Barcelona	
August	2026	Javi Hernández	Spain	MF	Espanyol	
September	2026	Yassir Zabiri	Morocco	FW	Racing Santander	
October	2026	Adrián Niño	Spain	FW	Málaga	

== Multiple winners ==
As of October 2026

The following table lists the number of awards won by players who have won at least two Player of the Month awards.

Players in bold are still active in La Liga.

Rank	Player	Wins
1st	(Spain) **Alberto Moleiro**	3
1st	(Spain) **Lamine Yamal**	3
3rd	(Spain) **Pau Cubarsí**	2
3rd	(Turkey) **Arda Güler**	2
3rd	(Spain) Víctor Muñoz	2
3rd	(Portugal) Fábio Silva	2

== Awards won by nationality ==
As of October 2026

Nationality	Players	Wins
Spain	12	18
Brazil	4	4
Portugal	1	2
Turkey	1	2
England	1	1
Morocco	1	1
Sweden	1	1
United States	1	1

== Awards won by club ==
As of October 2026

Club	Players	Wins
Barcelona	3	6
Girona	4	4
Real Madrid	3	4
Las Palmas	2	3
Valencia	2	2
Osasuna	1	2
Villarreal	1	2
Celta Vigo	1	1
Espanyol	1	1
Getafe	1	1
Granada	1	1
Racing Santander	1	1
Real Betis	1	1
Málaga	1	1

== Awards won by position ==
As of October 2026

Position	Players	Wins
Midfielder	9	13
Forward	9	12
Defender	4	5
Goalkeeper	0	0

== See also ==
- La Liga Player of the Month
- La Liga Manager of the Month
- La Liga Goal of the Month
- La Liga Save of the Month
- La Liga Awards
