= La Liga Save of the Month =

Spanish association football award

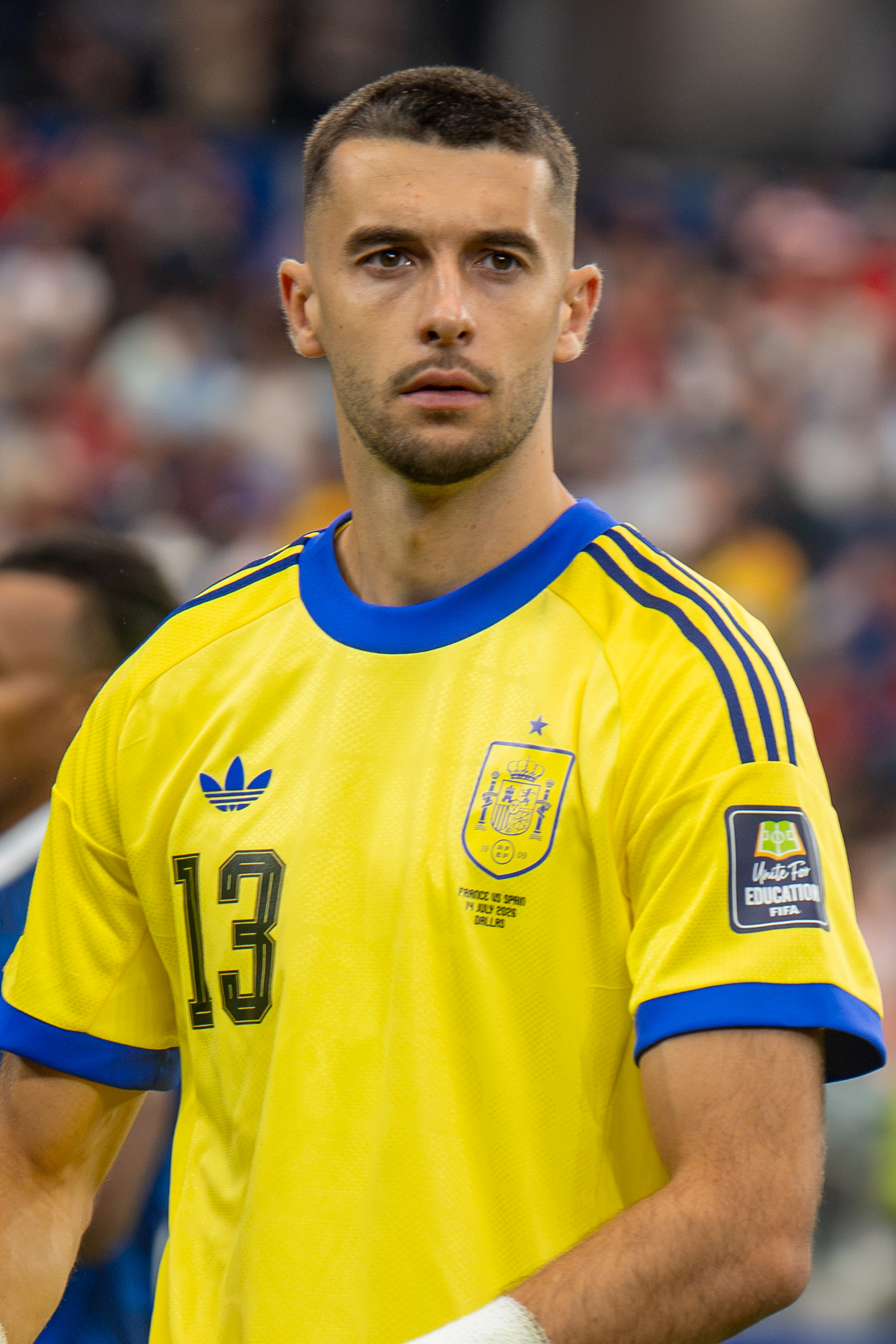
Joan Garcia has won the Save of the Month award a record four times.

The La Liga Save of the Month is an association football award that recognises the goalkeeper deemed to have made the best La Liga save in each month of the season from August to May. The award was introduced for the 2024–25 season.

The first recipient of the award was Villarreal goalkeeper Diego Conde for his double save against Sevilla. Conde was also the first player to have won the award twice. Winning in February and March 2025, Espanyol goalkeeper Joan Garcia became the first player to have won the award in consecutive months.

== Winners ==
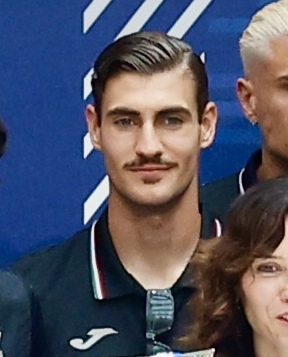
Diego Conde won the first Save of the Month award in August 2024.

Key
Player (X)	Name of the player and number of times they had won the award at that point (if more than one).
Italics	Home team.
	La Liga Save of the Season.

Month	Year	Nationality	Player	Club	Opponent	Date	Ref.
August	2024	Spain	Diego Conde	Villarreal	Sevilla	23 August 2024	
September	2024	Serbia	Marko Dmitrović	Leganés	Getafe	22 September 2024	
October	2024	Slovenia	Jan Oblak	Atlético Madrid	Real Sociedad	6 October 2024	
November	2024	Spain	Diego Conde (2)	Villarreal	Alavés	9 November 2024	
December	2024	Serbia	Marko Dmitrović (2)	Leganés	Barcelona	15 December 2024	
January	2025	Spain	Sergio Herrera	Osasuna	Rayo Vallecano	19 January 2025	
February	2025	Spain	Joan Garcia	Espanyol	Real Sociedad	9 February 2025	
March	2025	Spain	Joan Garcia (2)	Espanyol	Girona	10 March 2025	
April	2025	Norway	Ørjan Nyland	Sevilla	Valencia	11 April 2025	
August	2025	Spain	Joan Garcia (3)	Barcelona	Rayo Vallecano	31 August 2025	
September	2025	Spain	Sergio Herrera (2)	Osasuna	Villarreal	20 September 2025	
October	2025	Slovenia	Jan Oblak (2)	Atlético Madrid	Osasuna	18 October 2025	
November	2025	Spain	David Soria	Getafe	Atlético Madrid	23 November 2025	
December	2025	Slovenia	Jan Oblak (3)	Atlético Madrid	Girona	21 December 2025	
January	2026	Spain	Joan Garcia (4)	Barcelona	Espanyol	3 January 2026	
February	2026	Greece	Odysseas Vlachodimos	Sevilla	Girona	8 February 2026	
March	2026	Serbia	Marko Dmitrović (3)	Espanyol	Mallorca	15 March 2026	
April	2026	Argentina	Paulo Gazzaniga	Girona	Real Madrid	11 April 2026	
August	2026	Spain	Unai Simón	Athletic Bilbao	Barcelona	27 August 2026	
September	2026	Spain	Álvaro Valles	Real Betis	Villarreal	14 September 2026	
October	2026	Indonesia	Emil Audero	Rayo Vallecano	Getafe	19 October 2026	

== Multiple winners ==
As of October 2026

The following table lists the number of awards won by players who have won at least two Save of the Month awards.

Players in bold are still active in La Liga.

Rank	Player	Wins
1st	(Spain) **Joan Garcia**	4
2nd	(Slovenia) **Jan Oblak**	3
2nd	(Serbia) **Marko Dmitrović**	3
4th	(Spain) **Diego Conde**	2
4th	(Spain) **Sergio Herrera**	2

== Awards won by club ==
As of October 2026

Club	Players	Wins
Atlético Madrid	1	3
Espanyol	2	3
Sevilla	2	2
Barcelona	1	2
Leganés	1	2
Osasuna	1	2
Villarreal	1	2
Athletic Bilbao	1	1
Getafe	1	1
Girona	1	1
Real Betis	1	1
Rayo Vallecano	1	1

== Awards won by nationality ==
As of October 2026

Nationality	Players	Wins
Spain	6	11
Serbia	1	3
Slovenia	1	3
Greece	1	1
Norway	1	1
Argentina	1	1
Indonesia	1	1

== See also ==
- La Liga Player of the Month
- La Liga U23 Player of the Month
- La Liga Manager of the Month
- La Liga Goal of the Month
- La Liga Awards
