= La Liga Manager of the Month =

Football award

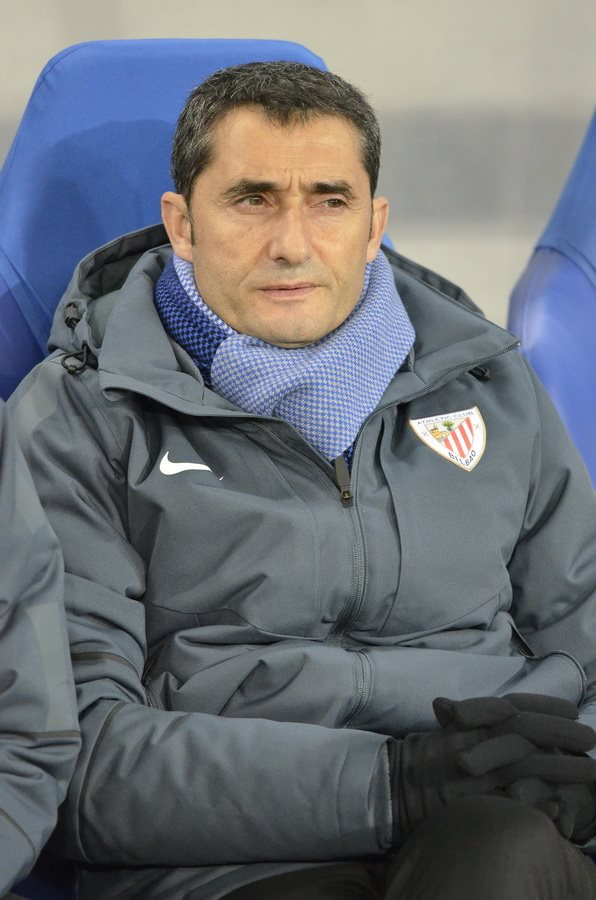
Ernesto Valverde won the Manager of the Month award a record eight times.

The La Liga Manager of the Month is an association football award that recognises the best adjudged La Liga manager each month of the season. Established in 2013, the award was abandoned after the conclusion of the 2016–17 La Liga season, but was later reinstated after six years following the rebranding of the league ahead of the 2023–24 season.

== Winners ==
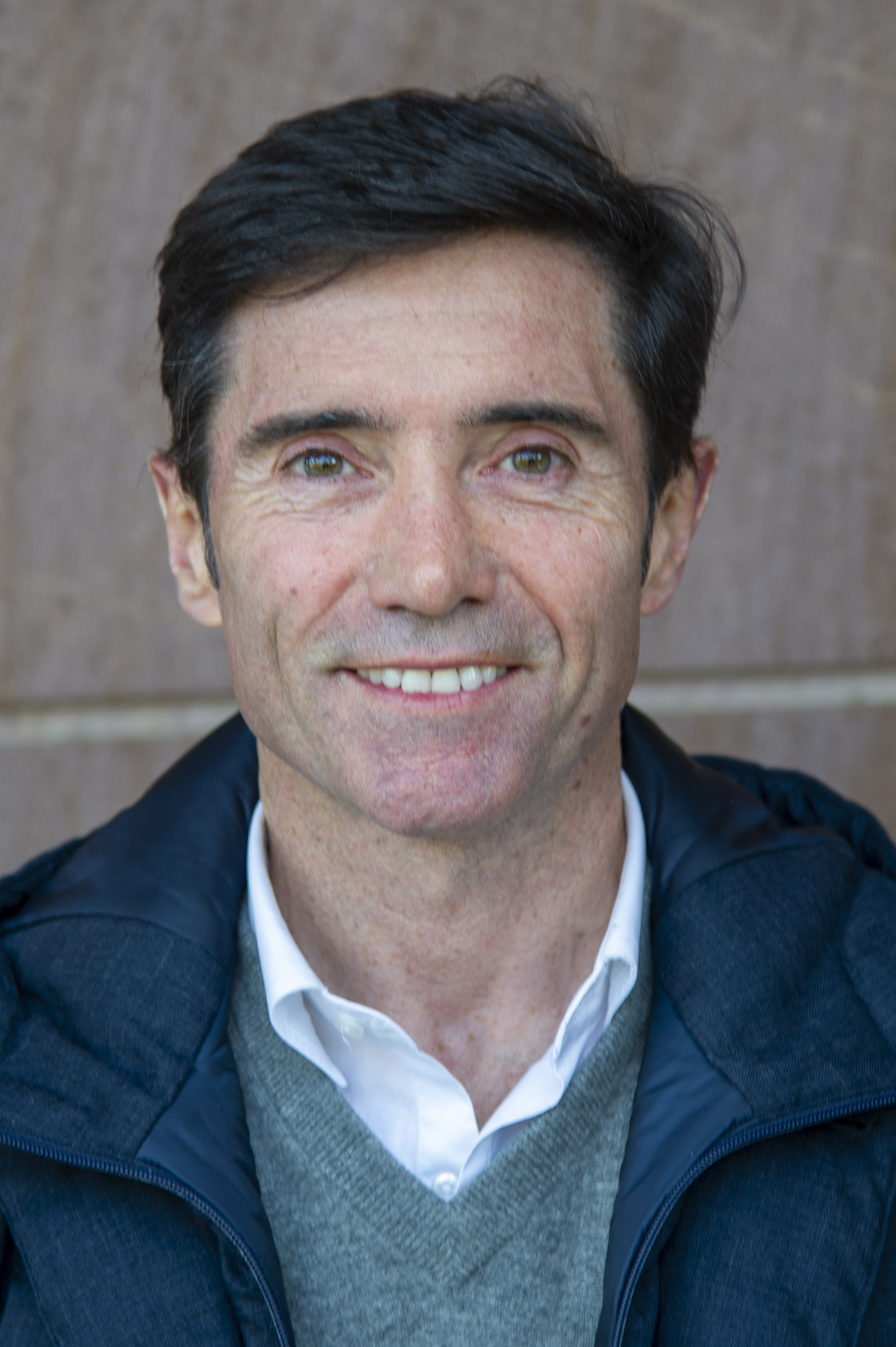
Marcelino won the first Manager of the Month award in September 2013.

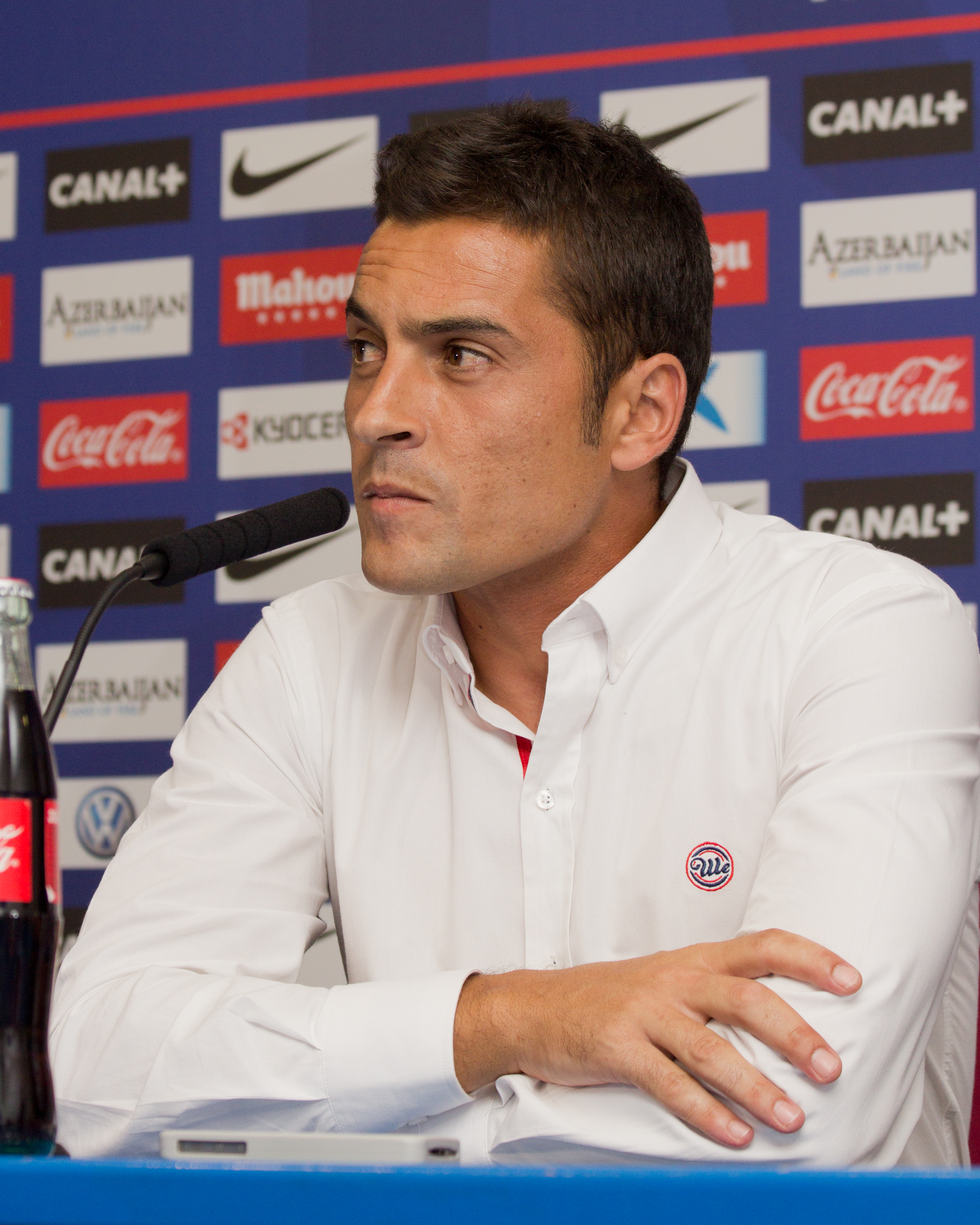
Francisco was the first manager to win the award twice in a season.

Month	Year (Note: Each year is linked to an article on the particular season associated with the month of that year.)	Manager	Nationality	Team	Ref.
September	2013	Marcelino	Spain	Villarreal	
October	2013	Diego Simeone	Argentina	Atlético Madrid	
November	2013	Francisco	Spain	Almería	
December	2013	Jagoba Arrasate	Spain	Real Sociedad	
January	2014	Ernesto Valverde	Spain	Athletic Bilbao	
February	2014	Juan Antonio Pizzi	Spain	Valencia	
March	2014	Unai Emery	Spain	Sevilla	
April	2014	Paco Jémez	Spain	Rayo Vallecano	
May	2014	Francisco	Spain	Almería	
September	2014	Nuno Espírito Santo	Portugal	Valencia	
October	2014	Carlo Ancelotti	Italy	Real Madrid	
November	2014	Ernesto Valverde	Spain	Athletic Bilbao	
December	2014	Nuno Espírito Santo	Portugal	Valencia	
January	2015	Unai Emery	Spain	Sevilla	
February	2015	Nuno Espírito Santo	Portugal	Valencia	
March	2015	Ernesto Valverde	Spain	Athletic Bilbao	
April	2015	Carlo Ancelotti	Italy	Real Madrid	
May	2015	José Ramón Sandoval	Spain	Granada	
September	2015	Marcelino	Spain	Villarreal	
October	2015	Ernesto Valverde	Spain	Athletic Bilbao	
November	2015	Diego Simeone	Argentina	Atlético Madrid	
December	2015	Javi Gracia	Spain	Málaga	
January	2016	Unai Emery	Spain	Sevilla	
February	2016	Eusebio	Spain	Real Sociedad	
March	2016	Quique Setién	Spain	Las Palmas	
April	2016	Zinedine Zidane	France	Real Madrid	
May	2016	Luis Enrique	Spain	Barcelona	
August	2016	Quique Setién	Spain	Las Palmas	
September	2016	Ernesto Valverde	Spain	Athletic Bilbao	
October	2016	Jorge Sampaoli	Argentina	Sevilla	
November	2016	Eusebio	Spain	Real Sociedad	
December	2016	Fran Escribá	Spain	Villarreal	
January	2017	Eduardo Berizzo	Argentina	Celta Vigo	
February	2017	José Luis Mendilibar	Spain	Eibar	
March	2017	Diego Simeone	Argentina	Atlético Madrid	
April	2017	Míchel (Note: José Miguel González Martín del Campo.)	Spain	Málaga	
May	2017	Zinedine Zidane	France	Real Madrid	
August	2023	Carlo Ancelotti	Italy	Real Madrid	
September	2023	Míchel (Note: Miguel Ángel Sánchez Muñoz.)	Spain	Girona	
October	2023	Diego Simeone	Argentina	Atlético Madrid	
November	2023	Míchel	Spain	Girona	
December	2023	Ernesto Valverde	Spain	Athletic Bilbao	
January	2024	Míchel	Spain	Girona	
February	2024	Ernesto Valverde	Spain	Athletic Bilbao	
March	2024	Marcelino	Spain	Villarreal	
April	2024	Carlo Ancelotti	Italy	Real Madrid	
August	2024	Hansi Flick	Germany	Barcelona	
September	2024	Ernesto Valverde	Spain	Athletic Bilbao	
October	2024	Hansi Flick	Germany	Barcelona	
November	2024	Míchel	Spain	Girona	
December	2024	Diego Simeone	Argentina	Atlético Madrid	
January	2025	José Bordalás	Spain	Getafe	
February	2025	Hansi Flick	Germany	Barcelona	
March	2025	Manuel Pellegrini	Chile	Real Betis	
April	2025	Manolo González	Spain	Espanyol	
August	2025	Xabi Alonso	Spain	Real Madrid	
September	2025	Eder Sarabia	Spain	Elche	
October	2025	Iñigo Pérez	Spain	Rayo Vallecano	
November	2025	Marcelino	Spain	Villarreal	
December	2025	Manolo González	Spain	Espanyol	
January	2026	Pellegrino Matarazzo	United States	Real Sociedad	
February	2026	Manuel Pellegrini	Chile	Real Betis	
March	2026	Hansi Flick	Germany	Barcelona	
April	2026	Martín Demichelis	Argentina	Mallorca	
August	2026	Quique Sánchez Flores	Spain	Alavés	
September	2026	Hansi Flick	Germany	Barcelona	
October	2026	José Mourinho	Portugal	Real Madrid	

== Multiple winners ==
The following table lists the number of awards won by managers who have won at least two Manager of the Month awards.

Managers in bold are still active in La Liga.

Rank	Manager	Wins
1	(Spain) Ernesto Valverde	8
2	(Argentina) **Diego Simeone**	5
2	(Germany) **Hansi Flick**	5
4	(Italy) Carlo Ancelotti	4
4	(Spain) Marcelino	4
4	(Spain) Míchel	4
7	(Spain) Unai Emery	3
7	(Portugal) Nuno Espírito Santo	3
9	(Spain) Eusebio	2
9	(Spain) Francisco	2
9	(Spain) **Manolo González**	2
9	(Chile) **Manuel Pellegrini**	2
9	(Spain) Quique Setién	2
9	(France) Zinedine Zidane	2

== Awards won by nationality ==
As of October 2026

Nationality	Managers	Wins
Spain	22	41
Argentina	4	8
Germany	1	5
Italy	1	4
Portugal	2	4
Chile	1	2
France	1	2
United States	1	1

== Awards won by club ==
As of October 2026

Club	Managers	Wins
Athletic Bilbao	1	8
Real Madrid	4	8
Barcelona	2	6
Atlético Madrid	1	5
Villarreal	2	5
Sevilla	2	4
Valencia	2	4
Real Sociedad	3	4
Girona	1	4
Málaga	2	2
Rayo Vallecano	2	2
Almería	1	2
Espanyol	1	2
Las Palmas	1	2
Real Betis	1	2
Alavés	1	1
Celta Vigo	1	1
Eibar	1	1
Elche	1	1
Getafe	1	1
Granada	1	1
Mallorca	1	1

== See also ==
- La Liga Player of the Month
- La Liga U23 Player of the Month
- La Liga Goal of the Month
- La Liga Save of the Month
- La Liga Awards
