= Fábio Silva (footballer, born 2002) =

Portuguese footballer (born 2002)

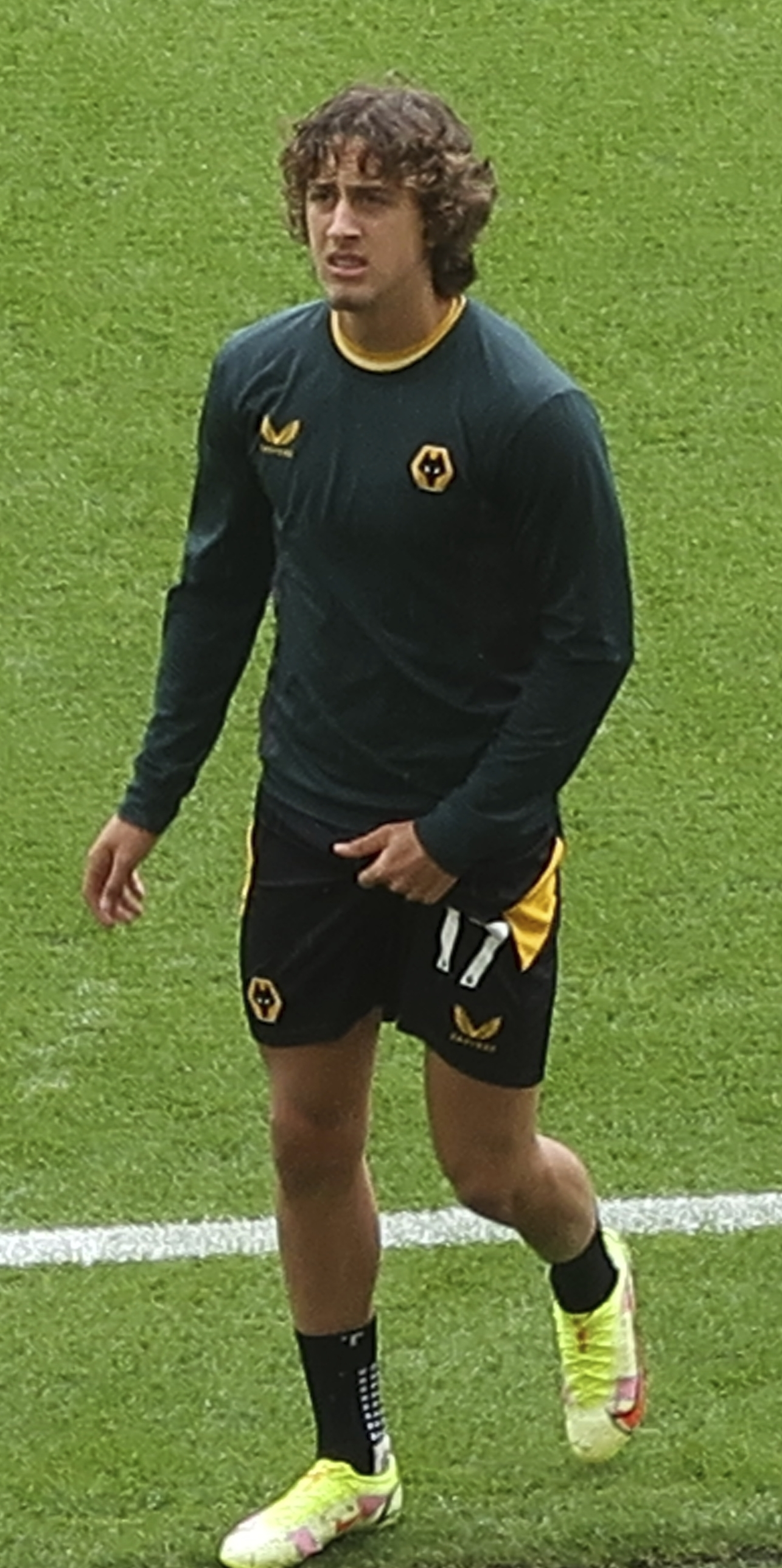
- Silva with Wolverhampton Wanderers in 2021

Personal information
- Full name: Fábio Daniel Soares Silva
- Date of birth: 19 July 2002 (age 24)
- Place of birth: Gondomar, Portugal
- Height: 1.85 m (6 ft 1 in)
- Position: Forward

Team information
- Current team: Borussia Dortmund
- Number: 21

Youth career
- 2010–2015: Porto
- 2015–2017: Benfica
- 2017–2019: Porto

Senior career*
Years	Team	Apps	(Gls)
2019–2020	Porto	12	(1)
2020	Porto B	3	(0)
2020–2025	Wolverhampton Wanderers	62	(4)
2022–2023	→ Anderlecht (loan)	20	(7)
2023	→ PSV (loan)	14	(4)
2024	→ Rangers (loan)	18	(4)
2024–2025	→ Las Palmas (loan)	24	(10)
2025–	Borussia Dortmund	34	(5)

International career
2017	Portugal U15	5	(5)
2017–2018	Portugal U16	8	(6)
2017–2019	Portugal U17	19	(5)
2019	Portugal U19	5	(3)
2021–2025	Portugal U21	28	(15)
2024	Portugal	1	(0)
- * Club domestic league appearances and goals as of 31 October 2026

Fábio Daniel Soares Silva (born 19 July 2002) is a Portuguese professional footballer who plays as a forward for Bundesliga club Borussia Dortmund and the Portugal national team.

Silva made his professional debut for Porto in August 2019, and set several club records relating to his young age, while winning the Primeira Liga and Taça de Portugal in his only season. He then signed for Premier League club Wolverhampton Wanderers for a club-record fee, and was loaned to Anderlecht, PSV, Rangers and Las Palmas, winning the KNVB Cup with PSV in 2023.

Having represented the country since under-15 level in 2017, Silva made his senior international debut for Portugal in 2024.

== Club career ==
=== Early career ===
Born in Gondomar, Porto District, Silva began his career at Porto youth academy before transferring to rivals Benfica youth academy in 2015, then returning two years later. Silva was part of the squad that won the 2018–19 UEFA Youth League. With 20 goals in 26 games for the under-19 team by February 2019, he was called up by manager Sérgio Conceição to train with the first team.

=== Porto ===
He made his Primeira Liga debut for Porto on 10 August 2019 in a 2–1 loss at Gil Vicente, playing the final eleven minutes in place of Otávio; at 17 years and 22 days, he surpassed Bruno Gama as the youngest league player in the club's history. On 19 September against Young Boys in the UEFA Europa League group stage, he became the club's youngest player in European competitions, beating Rúben Neves. Six days later, he became the club's youngest starter in any competition when he lined up against Santa Clara in the Taça da Liga group stage, beating a record held by Serafim Pereira since 1960.

On 19 October, Silva scored his first goal to conclude a 5–0 win at neighbouring Coimbrões in the third round of the Taça de Portugal; with this goal he surpassed Neves as the youngest goalscorer in the club's history, by a month. Eight days later, he beat the same player's record as Porto's youngest league goalscorer in a 3–0 home win over Famalicão. On 10 November, in a 1–0 win at Boavista in the Derby da Invicta, he became the youngest league starter in the club's history, a record held since Serafim's days.

On 9 February 2020, Silva dropped into Porto's reserve team in LigaPro, debuting as a starter in a 1–1 home draw with Farense, as one of three appearances at this level. He made two further appearances for Porto's first team following the resumption of the league after the coronavirus-enforced shutdown as the club won the league title.

=== Wolverhampton Wanderers ===
==== 2020–2022: Struggles in England ====
On 5 September 2020, Silva joined English club Wolverhampton Wanderers on a five-year deal for a club record fee of a reported £35 million. He made his full debut on 17 September 2020 in an EFL Cup defeat to Stoke City; four days later, he made his Premier League debut as a second-half substitute in a 3–1 home loss to Manchester City.

Silva scored his first two goals in a Wolves shirt for the under-21 team in a 2–1 away win over Doncaster Rovers in the EFL Trophy on 10 November 2020. His first league start was in a 1–0 home defeat against Aston Villa on 12 December, and eight days later he scored his first league goal through a penalty in a 2–1 away loss against Burnley. On 16 January 2021, Silva scored his first goal from open play and his first goal at Molineux for Wolves against West Bromwich Albion in the first Black Country derby of the 2020–21 season.

Silva made his first start for Wolves in the 2021–22 Premier League season in a 2–1 away win over Brentford on 22 January 2022, due to Raúl Jiménez missing the game through injury.

Silva scored his first goal for Wolves since 3 May 2021 in a home EFL Cup game against Blackpool on 29 August 2023, a match that Wolves went on to win 5–0.

==== 2022–2025: Various loans and departure ====
On 19 July 2022, Silva joined Belgian club Anderlecht on a season-long loan, as well as signing a contract extension with Wolves until 2026 with the option of a further year. Five days later, he scored on his Belgian Pro League debut against Oostende after coming off the bench in a 2–0 win; he finished his spell in Brussels with 32 games and 11 goals in all competitions.

The agreement with Anderlecht was terminated on 25 January 2023 and Silva was loaned out to Eredivisie side PSV Eindhoven until the end of the season. On 30 April, in the final of the KNVB Cup, he came on for Luuk de Jong at half time of extra time in a 1–1 draw with Ajax; he then scored the winner in the penalty shootout. Silva ended his spell under manager Ruud van Nistelrooy with 19 games and 5 goals.

On 1 January 2024, Wolverhampton sent Silva on loan to Scottish Premiership club Rangers until the end of the 2023–24 season; he was the first signing by Philippe Clement. He made his debut against Kilmarnock as a second-half substitute the following day. Silva scored his first goal for Rangers in a 3–0 home victory over Livingston on 3 February.

Silva joined La Liga side Las Palmas on a one-year loan deal on 30 August 2024. Three months later he scored the winning goal in a 2–1 victory away to Barcelona, defeating the league leaders at the Estadi Olímpic Lluís Companys during their 125th anniversary celebrations.

=== Borussia Dortmund ===
On 29 August 2025, Bundesliga club Borussia Dortmund announced the signing of Silva on a contract valid until 30 June 2030. Later that year, on 21 October, he scored his first goal for the club in a 4–2 away win over Copenhagen in the Champions League.

== International career ==
Silva had his first international experience with Portugal's under-15 team in 2017. He was part of the under-17 team that reached the quarter-finals of the 2019 UEFA European Championship in the Republic of Ireland, scoring in a 4–2 group win over Iceland.

On 11 October 2019, Silva scored a hat-trick for the under-19s in a 4–1 friendly win over Italy in Bragança.

In November 2024, having scored three goals on loan at Las Palmas, Silva was called up by senior international manager Roberto Martínez for a UEFA Nations League match against Croatia, with Pedro Neto having returned to Chelsea after helping the country qualify for the quarter-finals. He debuted on 18 November in the 1–1 away draw, and Martínez praised him as offering a different style of play to Cristiano Ronaldo, Diogo Jota or Gonçalo Ramos.

== Personal life ==
Silva's father Jorge was a defensive midfielder who won the league in 2001 for Boavista and was capped twice by Portugal, and his older brother also named Jorge played that position for Lazio.

== Career statistics ==
=== Club ===
As of match played 4 November 2026

Appearances and goals by club, season and competition
Club	Season	League			National cup (Note: Includes Taça de Portugal, FA Cup, Belgian Cup, KNVB Cup, Scottish Cup, Copa del Rey, DFB-Pokal)		League cup (Note: Includes Taça da Liga, EFL Cup)		Europe		Other		Total	
Club	Season	Division	Apps	Goals	Apps	Goals	Apps	Goals	Apps	Goals	Apps	Goals	Apps	Goals
Porto B	2019–20	LigaPro	3	0	—		—		—		—		3	0
Porto	2019–20	Primeira Liga	12	1	3	2	3	0	3 (Note: Appearances in UEFA Europa League)	0	—		21	3
Wolverhampton Wanderers	2020–21	Premier League	32	4	4	0	1	0	—		—		37	4
Wolverhampton Wanderers	2021–22	Premier League	22	0	2	0	2	0	—		—		26	0
Wolverhampton Wanderers	2023–24	Premier League	8	0	—		2	1	—		—		10	1
Wolverhampton Wanderers	Total		62	4	6	0	5	1	—		—		73	5
Anderlecht (loan)	2022–23	Belgian Pro League	20	7	2	1	—		10 (Note: Appearances in UEFA Europa Conference League)	3	—		32	11
PSV Eindhoven (loan)	2022–23	Eredivisie	14	4	3	0	—		2	1	—		19	5
Rangers (loan)	2023–24	Scottish Premiership	18	4	5	2	—		2	0	—		25	6
Las Palmas (loan)	2024–25	La Liga	24	10	1	0	—		—		—		25	10
Borussia Dortmund	2025–26	Bundesliga	28	2	2	0	—		9 (Note: Appearances in UEFA Champions League)	1	—		39	3
Borussia Dortmund	2026–27	Bundesliga	6	3	2	1	—		4	1	1 (Note: Appearance in Franz Beckenbauer Supercup)	1	13	6
Borussia Dortmund	Total		34	5	4	1	—		13	2	1	1	52	9
Career total			187	35	24	6	8	1	30	6	1	1	250	49

=== International ===
Appearances and goals by national team and year
National team	Year	Apps	Goals
Portugal	2024	1	0
Total		1	0

== Honours ==
Porto Youth

- UEFA Youth League: 2018–19

Porto

- Primeira Liga: 2019–20
- Taça de Portugal: 2019–20

PSV

- KNVB Cup: 2022–23

Portugal U16

- Montaigu Tournament: 2017, 2018

Individual

- La Liga U23 Player of the Month: November 2024, April 2025
