= Juan Cruz (footballer, born 2000) =

Spanish footballer

Personal information
- Full name: Juan Cruz Díaz Espósito
- Date of birth: 25 April 2000 (age 26)
- Place of birth: Quilmes, Argentina
- Height: 1.77 m (5 ft 10 in)
- Position: Winger

Team information
- Current team: Málaga (on loan from Leganés)
- Number: 19

Youth career
- 2010–2016: Málaga
- 2016–2017: San Félix
- 2017–2018: Málaga

Senior career*
| Years | Team | Apps | (Gls) |
| 2017–2021 | Málaga B | 64 | (11) |
| 2018–2021 | Málaga | 4 | (0) |
| 2021–2023 | Betis B | 38 | (7) |
| 2022–2024 | Betis | 11 | (1) |
| 2024 | → Leganés (loan) | 16 | (4) |
| 2024– | Leganés | 73 | (8) |
| 2026– | → Málaga (loan) | 0 | (0) |

International career^{‡}
| 2018 | Spain U18 | 2 | (0) |
- * Club domestic league appearances and goals as of 9 June 2026 ‡ National team caps and goals as of 30 June 2018

Juan Cruz Díaz Espósito (Note: In this Spanish name, the first or paternal surname is Díaz and the second or maternal family name is Espósito.) (born 25 April 2000), known as Juan Cruz, is a Spanish professional footballer who plays as a winger for Málaga CF on loan from CD Leganés.

== Club career ==
Born in Quilmes, Argentina, Cruz grew up in Rincón de la Victoria, Málaga, Andalusia, and joined Málaga CF's youth setup in 2010. He made his senior debut with the reserves on 19 November 2017, coming on as a second-half substitute for Nacho Abeledo in a 5–1 Tercera División home routing of Martos CD.

Cruz made his first team – and La Liga – debut on 19 May 2018, replacing Mehdi Lacen in a 0–1 home loss against Getafe CF. On 1 July 2021, he signed a two-year contract with Real Betis after his deal with Málaga expired; he was assigned to the B-team.

On 21 October 2022, five days after his first team debut for the Verdiblancos, Cruz signed a new contract with the club until 2025. He scored his first professional goal nine days later, netting the opener in a 2–0 away win over Real Sociedad.

Definitely promoted to the first team of Betis for the 2023–24 season, Cruz only featured rarely before moving to Segunda División side CD Leganés on loan on 1 February 2024. After helping in their promotion to the top tier as champions, he signed a permanent four-year contract with the club on 12 June.

On 19 July 2026, Cruz returned to his first club Málaga, now back to the top tier, on a one-year loan deal.

== Honours ==
Leganés

- Segunda División: 2023–24

Spain U18

- Mediterranean Games: Gold Medal 2018

Individual

- La Liga Goal of the Month: August 2024
