= Diego Conde =

Spanish footballer (born 1998)

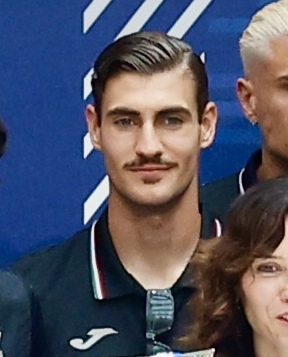
- Conde with Leganés in 2024

Personal information
- Full name: Diego José Conde Alcolado
- Date of birth: 28 October 1998 (age 28)
- Place of birth: Madrid, Spain
- Height: 1.88 m (6 ft 2 in)
- Position: Goalkeeper

Team information
- Current team: Betis (on loan from Villarreal)

Youth career
- 2007–2017: Atlético Madrid

Senior career*
Years	Team	Apps	(Gls)
2017–2020	Atlético Madrid B	19	(0)
2018–2019	→ Navalcarnero (loan)	23	(0)
2020–2021	Atlético Madrid	0	(0)
2020–2021	→ Leganés (loan)	3	(0)
2021–2023	Getafe	1	(0)
2023–2024	Leganés	40	(0)
2024–	Villarreal	22	(0)
2026–	→ Betis (loan)	0	(0)

International career
2016	Spain U19	1	(0)
- * Club domestic league appearances and goals as of 26 May 2025

Diego José Conde Alcolado (born 28 October 1998) is a Spanish professional footballer who plays as a goalkeeper for club Betis, on loan from Villarreal.

== Club career ==
Born in Madrid, Conde joined Atlético Madrid's youth setup in 2007. Promoted to the reserves ahead of the 2017–18 season, he made his senior debut on 19 November 2017 by starting in a 3–0 Segunda División B away loss against Deportivo Fabril.

After spending the season as a backup to Miguel San Román, Conde renewed his contract until 2021 on 1 July 2018, and was loaned to fellow third division side CDA Navalcarnero seventeen days later. Upon returning, he was assigned back to the B-team.

On 28 August 2020, Conde was loaned to Segunda División side CD Leganés, for one year. He made his professional debut on 20 September, starting in a 2–1 away loss against CD Lugo.

In July 2021, Conde joined La Liga side Getafe CF, initially as a third-choice behind Rubén Yáñez and David Soria. He made his top tier debut on 4 February 2022, coming on as a late substitute for the latter in a 3–0 home win over Levante UD.

After being again a third-choice behind Soria and Kiko Casilla during the 2022–23 campaign, Conde returned to Lega on 16 June 2023, signing a permanent two-year contract. An undisputed starter, he won the Ricardo Zamora Trophy after conceding only 27 goals during the entire season as his side achieved promotion as champions.

On 2 July 2024, Conde signed a five-year contract with Villarreal CF in the top tier. In a league game against Sevilla on 23 August, Conde made a double save to deny Saúl and Isaac Romero, which would later win the inaugural La Liga Save of the Month award for August. On 9 November, Conde made a close-range stop to keep out Kike García's header in a match against Alavés that earned him the second accolade for November. By achieving the honour, he became the first player to have won the award twice.

Conde lost his starting spot to Luiz Júnior in January 2025, and after moving further down the pecking order after the arrival of Arnau Tenas, he was loaned to fellow top tier Real Betis on 20 July 2026.

== Personal life ==
Conde's sister María is a professional basketball player.

== Career statistics ==
As of match played 29 October 2025

Appearances and goals by club, season and competition
Club	Season	League			National cup		Europe		Other		Total	
Club	Season	Division	Apps	Goals	Apps	Goals	Apps	Goals	Apps	Goals	Apps	Goals
Atlético Madrid B	2017–18	Segunda División B	4	0	—		—		—		4	0
Atlético Madrid B	2019–20	Segunda División B	15	0	—		—		0	0	15	0
Atlético Madrid B	Total		19	0	0	0	0	0	0	0	19	0
Navalcarnero (loan)	2018–19	Segunda División B	23	0	0	0	—		—		23	0
Leganés (loan)	2020–21	Segunda División	3	0	0	0	—		0	0	3	0
Getafe	2021–22	La Liga	1	0	0	0	—		—		1	0
Getafe	2022–23	La Liga	0	0	0	0	—		—		0	0
Getafe	Total		1	0	0	0	0	0	0	0	1	0
Leganés	2023–24	Segunda División	40	0	0	0	—		—		40	0
Villarreal	2024–25	La Liga	22	0	0	0	—		—		22	0
Villarreal	2025–26	La Liga	0	0	1	0	0	0	—		1	0
Villarreal	Total		22	0	1	0	0	0	0	0	23	0
Career total			108	0	1	0	0	0	0	0	109	0

== Honours ==
Leganés

- Segunda División: 2023–24

Individual

- Ricardo Zamora Trophy (Segunda División): 2023–24
- La Liga Save of the Month: August 2024, November 2024
