= Manolo González =

Spanish footballer

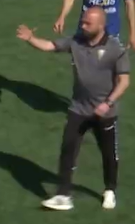
- González in 2020

Personal information
- Full name: José Manuel González Álvarez
- Date of birth: 14 January 1979 (age 47)
- Place of birth: Folgoso do Courel, Spain

Youth career
- 1987–1988: Colegio Dalvi
- 1988–1996: Martinenc
- 1996–1997: Sant Gabriel

Senior career*
Years	Team	Apps	(Gls)
- Martinenc
- Gramenet B
- Santboià
- Montañesa
- Poble Sec

Managerial career
- 1995–1996: Martinenc (youth)
- 1996–2005: Sant Gabriel (youth)
- 2005–2012: Badalona (youth)
- 2012–2014: Montañesa
- 2014–2018: Badalona
- 2018–2019: Ebro
- 2019–2021: Badalona
- 2021–2023: Peña Deportiva
- 2023–2024: Espanyol B
- 2024–2026: Espanyol
- * Club domestic league appearances and goals

José Manuel "Manolo" González Álvarez (born 14 January 1979) is a Spanish football manager and former player who is the former manager of La Liga club RCD Espanyol.

== Playing career ==
Born in Folgoso do Courel, Lugo, Galicia, González moved to Barcelona at the age of three, and began his career with Colegio Dalvi at the age of eight. In the following year, he moved to FC Martinenc, and spent a year with CE Sant Gabriel before making his senior debut with the former.

González subsequently played for UDA Gramenet B, FC Santboià and CF Montañesa, suffering a serious knee injury with the latter. He subsequently signed for UE Poble Sec, but had to retire.

== Managerial career ==
González started his managerial career at the age of 16, being in charge of the Infantil B squad of Martinenc. He subsequently managed San Gabriel in several different categories, also working as an urban bus driver.

In 2005, González joined CF Badalona as a manager of the Juvenil squad, and was in charge of the side for seven years before departing in May 2012. On 25 May of that year, he was appointed manager of the first team of Montañesa, in Tercera División.

On 20 June 2014, after missing out promotion in the play-offs, González returned to Badalona, now as manager of the main squad in Segunda División B; he was presented by the club on 3 July. On 7 May 2015, after leading the club to a fifth place finish, he renewed his contract until 2018.

On 31 May 2018, González left Badalona to take over fellow third division side CD Ebro. Despite leading the club to the round of 32 in the season's Copa del Rey and a 9th place in the league, he left on a mutual agreement on 23 May 2019.

On 7 October 2019, González returned to the Escapulats, replacing sacked Juanma Pons. He renewed his link with the club for a further year the following 20 May, but left on 26 May 2021, after refusing a new deal.

On 8 June 2021, González was named at the helm of SCR Peña Deportiva, in the newly-created Segunda División RFEF. On 31 May 2023, after missing out promotion in two consecutive play-offs, he left the club, and took over fellow league team RCD Espanyol B on 3 July.

On 12 March 2024, González was appointed manager of Espanyol's first team in Segunda División, replacing Luis Miguel Ramis. His first professional match in charge occurred five days later, a 1–0 away win over Real Zaragoza.

González led Espanyol to a promotion to La Liga at first attempt, after defeating Real Oviedo in the finals of the play-offs. He managed to narrowly avoid relegation in the 2024–25 campaign, and was named Manager of the Month in April after leading Espanyol to three consecutive victories.

On 15 July 2025, González renewed his contract with the Pericos until 2027, and was named Manager of the Month in December. He was sacked on 27 October 2026, following a 4–3 Copa del Rey extra-time loss at Sestao River Club.

== Managerial statistics ==
As of match played 27 October 2026

Managerial record by team and tenure
Team	Nat	From	To	Record								Ref
Team	Nat	From	To	G	W	D	L	GF	GA	GD	Win %	Ref
Montañesa	(Spain)	25 May 2012	20 June 2014	80	32	26	22	101	85	+16	40.00	
Badalona	(Spain)	20 June 2014	31 May 2018	162	56	60	46	173	159	+14	34.57	
Ebro	(Spain)	31 May 2018	23 May 2019	42	13	17	12	33	38	−5	30.95	
Badalona	(Spain)	7 October 2019	26 May 2021	50	15	17	18	43	49	−6	30.00	
Peña Deportiva	(Spain)	8 June 2021	31 May 2023	75	35	22	18	102	66	+36	46.67	
Espanyol B	(Spain)	3 July 2023	12 March 2024	26	10	8	8	32	29	+3	38.46	
Espanyol	(Spain)	12 March 2024	27 October 2026	107	33	30	44	119	135	−16	30.84	
Career total				542	194	180	168	603	561	+42	35.79	—

== Honours ==
=== Manager ===
Individual

- La Liga Manager of the Month: April 2025, December 2025
