= Arda Güler =

Turkish footballer (born 2005)

- Güler with Turkey in 2026

Personal information
- Full name: Arda Güler
- Date of birth: 25 February 2005 (age 21)
- Place of birth: Altındağ, Turkey
- Height: 1.75 m (5 ft 9 in)
- Positions: Attacking midfielder; winger

Team information
- Current team: Real Madrid
- Number: 15

Youth career
- 2014–2019: Gençlerbirliği
- 2019–2021: Fenerbahçe

Senior career*
Years	Team	Apps	(Gls)
2021–2023	Fenerbahçe	32	(7)
2023–	Real Madrid	84	(16)

International career^{‡}
2021–2022	Turkey U17	10	(4)
2022–	Turkey	38	(8)
- * Club domestic league appearances and goals as of 22:07, 21 November 2026 (UTC) ‡ National team caps and goals as of 15 November 2026 (UTC)

Arda Güler (Turkish pronunciation: [aɾˈda ˈɟylæɾ]; born 25 February 2005) is a Turkish professional footballer who plays as an attacking midfielder and winger for La Liga club Real Madrid and the Turkey national team. Known for his technical ability and skill, he is regarded as one of the best attacking midfielders in the world.

Güler began his senior career with the Turkish club Fenerbahçe in 2021, where he won the Turkish Cup in 2023. In the summer of the latter year, Güler signed with Spanish side Real Madrid. In his inaugural season with the Spanish giants, he won La Liga and the UEFA Champions League.

At the international level, Güler made his senior debut for Turkey in 2022. He was a member of the squad for UEFA Euro 2024, and played a key role in the team's run to the quarter-finals. He also represented Turkey at the 2026 FIFA World Cup, where the Turkish team was eliminated after the group stage.

== Club career ==
=== Early career ===
Güler started his youth career at Ankara-based club Gençlerbirliği in 2014. Arda Güler was discovered by Fenerbahçe on 20 February 2019, when he was only 13 years old, and was included in the youth squad. Güler, who has played in all of the Fenerbahçe youth teams including U-15, U-16 and U-19, first started playing for the Fenerbahçe U-15 team in the 2018-19 season, and was taken to the U-16 team in 2020 and the U19 team in 2021. He contributed 7 goals and 4 assists in 18 matches for the Fenerbahçe U-19 team. He made 3 goals and 1 assist in the U-19 Play-Off quarterfinal match, and thus attracted attention as the top scorer in that season's Play-Off.

=== Fenerbahçe ===
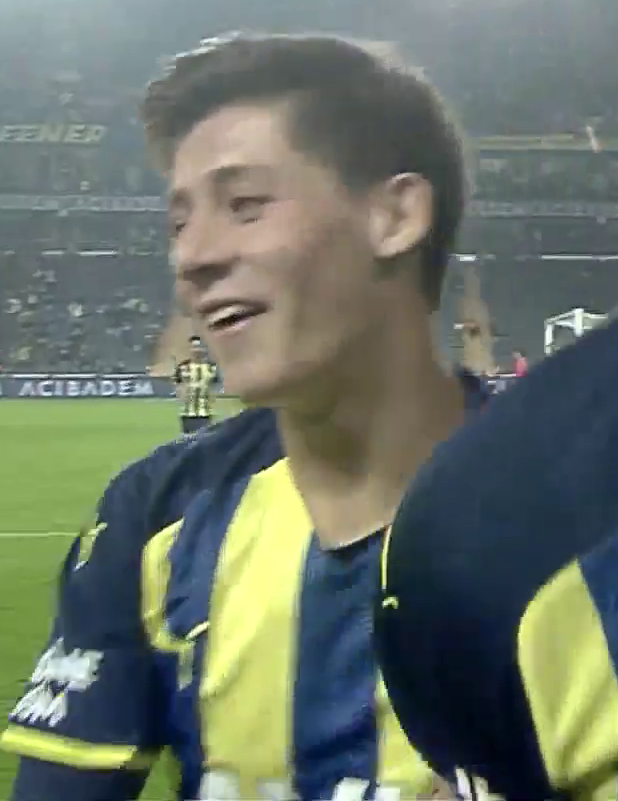
Güler with Fenerbahçe in 2021

Güler signed a two-and-a-half-year-long professional contract with Fenerbahçe on 13 January 2021. He was considered as a wonderkid and seen as a big prospect for the future.

==== 2021–22 season ====
Güler made his senior debut as a substitute player against Finnish club HJK in the play-off round encounter of the 2021–22 UEFA Europa League. Held at Şükrü Saracoğlu Stadium on 19 August 2021, it ended 1–0 for Fenerbahçe. In his first Süper Lig match three days later, he provided the assist that let Miha Zajc score a goal at the 89th minute of the 2–0 victory over Antalyaspor. He started getting more playing time as the 2021–22 season progressed.

In March 2022, Güler became Fenerbahçe's youngest goalscorer in Süper Lig history, having just turned 17 three weeks earlier. By May 2022, Güler had scored 3 goals and delivered 3 assists in just 255 minutes of playing time. After an impressive start to his career, it was reported that big European clubs like Arsenal, Liverpool, Bayern Munich, Borussia Dortmund, Barcelona and Paris Saint-Germain showed their interest in signing him. On 17 March 2022, Fenerbahçe announced that they had signed a three-year contract with him.

==== 2022–23 season ====
At the start of 2022–23 season, after the departure of Mesut Özil, Güler was given the number 10, which has a special meaning for Fenerbahçe fans, being the number of former players Alex de Souza and Jay-Jay Okocha. Güler played his first match of the season against Kasımpaşa and scored two goals in 21 minutes of play.

On 3 November 2022, he scored his first goal in European competitions, and also provided an assist, in a 2–0 away win over Dynamo Kyiv in the Europa League group stage. On 11 June 2023, Güler put in a man of the match performance in a 2–0 win at 2023 Turkish Cup final against İstanbul Başakşehir. On 6 July, Güler took to Instagram to announce his departure from Fenerbahçe, marking the end of his tenure with the Turkish club.

=== Real Madrid ===
On 6 July 2023, La Liga club Real Madrid announced the signing of Güler to a six-year contract lasting until June 2029. The deal was sealed by triggering his release clause with an initial payment of €20 million, which surpassed the €17.5 million clause from his former contract with Fenerbahçe. Güler requested Real Madrid to pay beyond his release clause to raise funds for his former club.

==== 2023–24 season ====
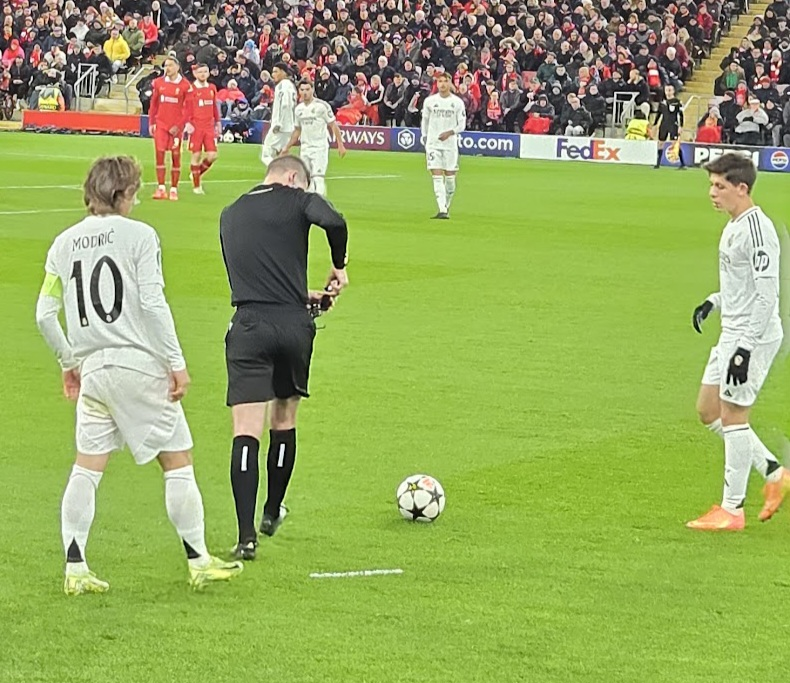
Güler (right) playing alongside Luka Modrić for Real Madrid in a Champions League match in 2024. Guler was born 2 years after Luka began his professional career.

Following multiple injuries in late 2023, Güler debuted for Real Madrid in the Copa del Rey match against Arandina on 6 January 2024, contributing to the team's 3–1 win. On 14 January, Güler won his first trophy with Real Madrid in the Supercopa de España final, where Real Madrid triumphed over Barcelona with a score of 4–1. He made his La Liga debut against Las Palmas on 27 January, coming on as a substitute in the 81st minute, replacing Rodrygo. On 10 March, he scored his first league goal for Real Madrid, dribbling past Celta Vigo goalkeeper Vicente Guaita in the fourth minute of stoppage time, five minutes after being substituted on, to seal a 4–0 league victory over Celta Vigo. On 26 April, Güler marked his first La Liga start with a goal in a 1–0 win against Real Sociedad at Reale Arena. On 19 May, he scored a brace against Villarreal in a 4–4 draw, becoming the fastest player in Real Madrid's history to score six La Liga goals in just 330 minutes of playing time. Although he did not play in the competition, he became the first Turkish player to win the UEFA Champions League when his club clinched their 15th title with a 2–0 win over Borussia Dortmund in the final.

==== 2024–25 season ====
Güler made his Champions League debut as a substitute in the opening match of the league phase, which ended in a 3–1 victory over Stuttgart on 17 September 2024. Later that year, he scored his first goal of the season in a 3–0 away win over Girona in La Liga on 7 December. After being used mainly in Copa del Rey matches and seeing limited time in league games for most part of the season, Güler was given rare back-to-back league starts on 23 April 2025 when he scored the winner and was nominated player of the match in a 1–0 win over Getafe, and on 4 May when he registered a goal and an assist in a 3–2 victory over Celta Vigo.

==== 2025–26 season ====
Following Xabi Alonso's appointment as Real Madrid head coach, Güler began featuring more regularly in the starting lineup, primarily in a midfield role. On 30 August 2025, he netted his first goal of the season in a 2–1 La Liga win over Mallorca, putting in a man-of-the-match performance. Throughout August and September, Güler began to play an increasingly important role in Real Madrid’s squad, earning consistent starts. His performances culminated in being named the La Liga U23 Player of the Month for September, having scored two goals and provided two assists during that period.

On 14 March 2026, Güler scored a 68-meter goal from his own half in a 4–1 victory over Elche, setting a new record for the longest goal ever scored in La Liga, tying the mark set by Antonio José in 2004 from a very similar distance.The goal was later named La Liga Goal of the Season. A month later, on 15 April, Güler scored his first Champions League goals, including the club's fastest-ever goal in the competition after 34 seconds, breaking previous record of Felo in 1962, before adding another from a free-kick, giving his side the lead on two separate occasions in a 4–3 away defeat against Bayern Munich in the quarter-finals. In addition, he was shown a red card after the final whistle for protesting the sending-off of his teammate, Eduardo Camavinga. At the conclusion of the tournament, he was awarded the Champions League's Young Player of the Season honor.

==== 2026–27 season ====
On 30 August 2026, Güler scored his first goal of the season in a 4–0 La Liga win over Málaga after coming on as a substitute in the 86th minute. On 18 November, he extended his contract with Madrid until 2032.

== International career ==
Güler is a Turkish youth international, having played up to the Turkey U21s. He made his senior international debut for Turkey on 19 November 2022, in their 2–1 friendly win against Czech Republic. He scored his first goal against Wales in Euro 2024 qualifiers on 19 June 2023.

=== UEFA Euro 2024 ===
Güler was named in Turkey's 26-man squad for UEFA Euro 2024. On 18 June 2024, he was awarded Player of the Match, as he scored in Turkey's 3–1 opening fixture win over Georgia, becoming the first teenager to score on his European Championship debut since Cristiano Ronaldo in 2004. With his goal, he also became the fifth-youngest goalscorer in the tournament's history and the youngest debutant to find the net, aged 19 years and 114 days, breaking Cristiano Ronaldo's previous record.

On 3 July, Güler provided an assist as Turkey defeated Austria 2–1 in the round of 16 and progressed into the quarter-finals. In doing so, he became only the third teenager in history to score and assist in the same Euros, following Cristiano Ronaldo and Wayne Rooney.

=== 2026 FIFA World Cup ===
Güler was selected in Turkey's 26-man squad for the 2026 FIFA World Cup in May 2026.

On 26 June 2026, in a 3–2 victory over the United States, Güler scored Turkey's first goal, becoming the youngest player in World Cup history to score for Turkey, and was named Man of the Match.

== Style of play ==
Considered by various media outlets and commentators to be one of the best young footballers in the world, Güler is a left-footed attacking midfielder who can also play as a winger, primarily on the right flank. He has been praised for his composure and ability to operate in tight spaces. A playmaker, Güler has also been noted for his impressive dribbling skill, vision, creativity, above-average passing skills, and technical ability from set-pieces.

== Personal life ==
Güler is in a relationship with Turkish former basketball player Duru Nayman.

== Career statistics ==
=== Club ===
As of match played 21 November 2026

Appearances and goals by club, season and competition
Club	Season	League			National cup (Note: Includes Turkish Cup, Copa del Rey)		Europe		Other		Total	
Club	Season	Division	Apps	Goals	Apps	Goals	Apps	Goals	Apps	Goals	Apps	Goals
Fenerbahçe	2021–22	Süper Lig	12	3	0	0	4 (Note: Two appearances in UEFA Europa League, two appearances in UEFA Europa Conference League)	0	—		16	3
Fenerbahçe	2022–23	Süper Lig	20	4	5	1	10 (Note: One appearance in UEFA Champions League, nine appearances and one goal in UEFA Europa League)	1	—		35	6
Fenerbahçe	Total		32	7	5	1	14	1	—		51	9
Real Madrid	2023–24	La Liga	10	6	1	0	0	0	1 (Note: Appearance(s) in Supercopa de España)	0	12	6
Real Madrid	2024–25	La Liga	28	3	6	2	7 (Note: Appearances in UEFA Champions League)	0	8 (Note: One appearance in UEFA Super Cup, one appearance in FIFA Intercontinental Cup, six appearances and one goal in FIFA Club World Cup)	1	49	6
Real Madrid	2025–26	La Liga	33	4	2	0	14	2	2	0	51	6
Real Madrid	2026–27	La Liga	13	3	0	0	2	1	0	0	15	4
Real Madrid	Total		84	16	9	2	23	3	11	1	127	22
Career total			116	23	14	3	37	4	11	1	178	31

=== International ===
As of match played 15 November 2026

Appearances and goals by national team and year
National team	Year	Apps	Goals
Turkey	2022	1	0
Turkey	2023	3	1
Turkey	2024	14	2
Turkey	2025	8	3
Turkey	2026	12	2
Total		38	8

Scores and results list Turkey's goal tally first, score column indicates score after each Güler goal.

List of international goals scored by Arda Güler
No.	Date	Venue	Cap	Opponent	Score	Result	Competition
1	19 June 2023	Samsun 19 Mayıs Stadium, Samsun, Turkey	4	Wales	2–0	2–0	UEFA Euro 2024 qualifying
2	18 June 2024	Westfalenstadion, Dortmund, Germany	8	Georgia	2–1	3–1	UEFA Euro 2024
3	14 October 2024	Laugardalsvöllur, Reykjavík, Iceland	16	Iceland	3–2	4–2	2024–25 UEFA Nations League B
4	23 March 2025	Puskás Aréna, Budapest, Hungary	19	Hungary	2–0	3–0	2024–25 UEFA Nations League promotion/relegation play-offs
5	7 June 2025	Pratt & Whitney Stadium, East Hartford, United States	20	United States	1–1	2–1	Friendly
6	11 October 2025	Vasil Levski National Stadium, Sofia, Bulgaria	24	Bulgaria	1–0	6–1	2026 FIFA World Cup qualification
7	25 June 2026	SoFi Stadium, Inglewood, United States	33	United States	1–1	3–2	2026 FIFA World Cup
8	12 November 2026	Gürsel Aksel Stadium, İzmir, Turkey	37	Belgium	1–0	1–2	2026–27 UEFA Nations League A

== Honours ==
Fenerbahçe

- Turkish Cup: 2022–23

Real Madrid

- La Liga: 2023–24
- Supercopa de España: 2024
- UEFA Champions League: 2023–24
- UEFA Super Cup: 2024
- FIFA Intercontinental Cup: 2024

Individual

- La Liga U23 Player of the Month: December 2024, September 2025
- UEFA Champions League Young Player of the Season: 2025–26
- La Liga Goal of the Season: 2025–26
- La Liga Team of the Season: 2025–26
