= 2024–25 La Liga =

94th season of La Liga

La Liga
- Season: 2024–25
- Dates: 15 August 2024 – 25 May 2025
- Champions: Barcelona; 28th title
- Relegated: Leganés; Las Palmas; Valladolid
- Champions League: Barcelona; Real Madrid; Atlético Madrid; Athletic Bilbao; Villarreal
- Europa League: Real Betis; Celta Vigo
- Conference League: Rayo Vallecano
- Matches: 380
- Goals: 995 (2.62 per match)
- Best player: Raphinha
- Top goalscorer: Kylian Mbappé (31 goals)
- Best goalkeeper: Jan Oblak (0.83 goals/match)
- Biggest home win: Barcelona 7–0 Valladolid (31 August 2024)
- Biggest away win: Valladolid 0–5 Atlético Madrid (30 November 2024)
- Highest scoring: Barcelona 7–1 Valencia (26 January 2025); Athletic Bilbao 7–1 Valladolid (23 February 2025)
- Longest winning run: Barcelona (9 matches)
- Longest unbeaten run: Barcelona (17 matches)
- Longest winless run: Valladolid (19 matches)
- Longest losing run: Valladolid (12 matches)
- Highest attendance: 78,192; Real Madrid 0–4 Barcelona (26 October 2024)
- Lowest attendance: 7,559; Getafe 1–0 Espanyol (9 December 2024)
- Attendance: 11,392,732 (29,981 per match)

The 2024–25 La Liga, also known as La Liga EA Sports due to sponsorship reasons, was the 94th season of La Liga, Spain's premier football competition. It commenced on 15 August 2024 and concluded on 25 May 2025. Real Madrid were the defending champions, having won their 36th title the previous season. The fixture schedule was announced on 18 June 2024.

On 15 May 2025, Barcelona officially secured their 28th title with two matches to spare following a 2–0 win against city rivals Espanyol.

== Teams ==
Location of teams in 2024–25 La Liga
Location of Community of Madrid teams in 2024–25 La Liga
Location of teams in 2024–25 La Liga (Canary Islands)

=== Promotion and relegation (pre-season) ===
A total of twenty teams contest the league, including seventeen sides from the 2023–24 season and three promoted from the 2023–24 Segunda División. This includes the two top teams from the Segunda División, and the winners of the promotion play-offs.

Teams relegated to Segunda División

The first team to be relegated from La Liga were Almería, after a 1–3 loss to Getafe on 27 April 2024, ending their two-year stay in top tier. The second team to be relegated was Granada, following Mallorca’s 1–0 win against Las Palmas, suffering immediate relegation. The third and final team relegated to Segunda was Cádiz, after a 0–0 draw against Las Palmas on 19 May 2024, ending their four-year stay in the top tier.

Teams promoted from Segunda División

On 26 May 2024, Valladolid became the first side to mathematically be automatically promoted, assured of a return to the top flight following a 3–2 win against Villarreal B, thus returning after a single season absence. The second and final team to earn automatic promotion was Leganés, following a 2–0 win against Elche on 2 June 2024, thus returning after a four-season absence and also being promoted to the top flight for the second time in their history. The third and final team to be promoted was Espanyol, following their win against Oviedo in the promotion play-off final, returning to the top flight after only a single season.

Promoted from 2023–24 Segunda División	Relegated from 2023–24 La Liga
Leganés; Valladolid; Espanyol	Almería; Granada; Cádiz

=== Stadiums and locations ===
Team	Location	Stadium	Capacity
Alavés	Vitoria-Gasteiz	Mendizorrotza	19,840
Athletic Bilbao	Bilbao	San Mamés	53,289
Atlético Madrid	Madrid (San Blas-Canillejas)	Metropolitano	70,460
Barcelona	Barcelona	Olímpic Lluís Companys	55,926
Celta Vigo	Vigo	Balaídos	24,870
Espanyol	Cornellà de Llobregat	RCDE Stadium	42,260
Getafe	Getafe	Coliseum	16,500
Girona	Girona	Montilivi	14,624
Las Palmas	Las Palmas	Gran Canaria	32,392
Leganés	Leganés	Municipal de Butarque	13,089
Mallorca	Palma	Mallorca Son Moix	23,142
Osasuna	Pamplona	El Sadar	23,576
Rayo Vallecano	Madrid (Puente de Vallecas)	Vallecas	14,708
Real Betis	Sevilla (Bellavista-La Palmera)	Benito Villamarín	60,721
Real Madrid	Madrid (Chamartín)	Santiago Bernabéu	78,297
Real Sociedad	San Sebastián	Anoeta	39,313
Sevilla	Sevilla (Nervión)	Ramón Sánchez-Pizjuán	43,883
Valencia	Valencia	Mestalla	49,430
Valladolid	Valladolid	José Zorrilla	27,618
Villarreal	Villarreal	La Cerámica	23,008

=== Personnel and kits ===
Team	Manager	Captain	Kit maker	Kit sponsors	
Team	Manager	Captain	Kit maker	Main	Other(s)
Alavés	(Argentina) Eduardo Coudet	(Spain) Antonio Sivera	Puma	Dexin News	List: Side: Araba-Álava; Back: Digi; Sleeves: EBpay; Shorts: Silken Hoteles
Athletic Bilbao	(Spain) Ernesto Valverde	(Spain) Óscar de Marcos	Castore	Kutxabank	List: Side: None; Back: Digi; Sleeves: B2BinPay; Shorts: Vueling
Atlético Madrid	(Argentina) Diego Simeone	(Spain) Koke	Nike	Riyadh Air	List: Side: None; Back: Hyundai; Sleeves: Kraken; Shorts: ComAve
Barcelona	(Germany) Hansi Flick	(Germany) Marc-André ter Stegen	Nike	Spotify	List: Side: None; Back: UNHCR; Sleeves: Ambilight TV; Shorts: None
Celta Vigo	(Spain) Claudio Giráldez	(Spain) Iago Aspas	Hummel	Estrella Galicia 0,0	List: Side: None; Back: Abanca; Sleeves: None; Shorts: Siweb, Grupo Recalvi
Espanyol	(Spain) Manolo González	(Spain) Sergi Gómez	Kelme	Conservas Dani	List: Side: None; Back: Rastar Group; Sleeves: None; Shorts: Škoda
Getafe	(Spain) José Bordalás	(Togo) Djené	Joma	Tecnocasa	List: Side: None; Back: Lowi; Sleeves: ODTY News; Shorts: None
Girona	(Spain) Míchel	(Uruguay) Cristhian Stuani	Puma	Etihad Airways	List: Side: None; Back: Marlex; Sleeves: HYLO; Shorts: Costa Brava Pirieneu de Girona, Parlem
Las Palmas	(Spain) Diego Martínez	(Spain) Kirian Rodríguez	Hummel	Gran Canaria	List: Side: Cervezas PÍO PÍO; Back: DISA, Islas Canarias; Sleeves: Kalise; Shorts: BeCordial, Binter Canarias
Leganés	(Spain) Borja Jiménez	(Spain) Sergio González	Joma	Ontime Logística	List: Side: Ibai Llanos / SportyTV Africa; Back: Nara Seguros, Lowi; Sleeves: Mercanza; Shorts: Urban Poke Bar, Ebury
Mallorca	(Spain) Jagoba Arrasate	(Spain) Antonio Raíllo	Nike	αGEL	List: Side: None; Back: Alua, Juaneda Hospitales; Sleeves: OK Mobility; Shorts: Air Europa, Iles Balears
Osasuna	(Spain) Vicente Moreno	(Spain) Sergio Herrera	Macron	Kosner	List: Side: None; Back: Digi; Sleeves: Celer Light; Shorts: Clínica Universidad de Navarra
Rayo Vallecano	(Spain) Iñigo Pérez	(Spain) Óscar Valentín	Umbro	Digi	List: Side: None; Back: None; Sleeves: Griffin Core Solutions; Shorts: None
Real Betis	(Chile) Manuel Pellegrini	(Spain) Isco	Hummel	Gree Electric	List: Side: None; Back: Forever Green, Trainline; Sleeves: Drive REVEL; Shorts: AUS Global
Real Madrid	(Italy) Carlo Ancelotti	(Croatia) Luka Modrić	Adidas	Emirates	List: Side: None; Back: None; Sleeves: HP; Shorts: None
Real Sociedad	(Spain) Imanol Alguacil	(Spain) Mikel Oyarzabal	Macron	Yasuda Group	List: Side: None; Back: Kutxabank; Sleeves: Reale Seguros; Shorts: None
Sevilla	(Spain) Joaquín Caparrós	(Serbia) Nemanja Gudelj	Castore	Midea	List: Side: None; Back: Socios.com; Sleeves: JD Sports; Shorts: None
Valencia	(Spain) Carlos Corberán	(Spain) José Gayà	Puma	TM Real Estate Group	List: Side: None; Back: None; Sleeves: Divina Seguros; Shorts: Škoda
Valladolid	(Spain) Álvaro Rubio	(Spain) Javi Sánchez	Kappa	Estrella Galicia 0,0	List: Side: None; Back: None; Sleeves: JD Sports; Shorts: INEXO
Villarreal	(Spain) Marcelino	(Spain) Raúl Albiol	Joma	Pamesa Cerámica	List: Side: None; Back: ASCALE; Sleeves: None; Shorts: None

=== Managerial changes ===
Team	Outgoing manager	Manner of departure	Date of vacancy	Position in table	Incoming manager	Date of appointment
Barcelona	(Spain) Xavi	Sacked	26 May 2024	Pre-season	(Germany) Hansi Flick	29 May 2024
Mallorca	(Mexico) Javier Aguirre	End of contract	30 June 2024	Pre-season	(Spain) Jagoba Arrasate	10 June 2024
Osasuna	(Spain) Jagoba Arrasate	End of contract	30 June 2024	Pre-season	(Spain) Vicente Moreno	27 May 2024
Sevilla	(Spain) Quique Sánchez Flores	Mutual consent	30 June 2024	Pre-season	(Spain) García Pimienta	2 June 2024
Las Palmas	(Spain) García Pimienta	Mutual consent	30 June 2024	Pre-season	(Spain) Luis Carrión	26 June 2024
Las Palmas	(Spain) Luis Carrión	Sacked	8 October 2024	20th	(Spain) Diego Martínez	9 October 2024
Valladolid	(Uruguay) Paulo Pezzolano	Sacked	30 November 2024	20th	(Spain) Álvaro Rubio (caretaker)	2 December 2024
Alavés	(Spain) Luis García	Sacked	2 December 2024	16th	(Argentina) Eduardo Coudet	2 December 2024
Valladolid	(Spain) Álvaro Rubio	End of caretaker spell	14 December 2024	19th	(Argentina) Diego Cocca	14 December 2024
Valencia	(Spain) Rubén Baraja	Sacked	23 December 2024	19th	(Spain) Carlos Corberán	25 December 2024
Valladolid	(Argentina) Diego Cocca	Sacked	17 February 2025	20th	(Spain) Álvaro Rubio (caretaker)	19 February 2025
Sevilla	(Spain) García Pimienta	Sacked	13 April 2025	14th	(Spain) Joaquín Caparrós (caretaker)	13 April 2025

== League table ==
Pos	Team	Pld	W	D	L	GF	GA	GD	Pts	Qualification or relegation
1	Barcelona (C)	38	28	4	6	102	39	+63	88	Qualification for the Champions League league stage (Note: La Liga gained an additional Champions League place as a result of Spain gaining one of the two European Performance Spots (EPS) awarded to the two associations with the highest UEFA coefficient points in 2024–25.)
2	Real Madrid	38	26	6	6	78	38	+40	84	Qualification for the Champions League league stage
3	Atlético Madrid	38	22	10	6	68	30	+38	76	Qualification for the Champions League league stage
4	Athletic Bilbao	38	19	13	6	54	29	+25	70 (Note: Athletic Bilbao finished ahead of Villarreal on head-to-head points: Athletic Bilbao 2–0 Villarreal, Villarreal 0–0 Athletic Bilbao.)	Qualification for the Champions League league stage
5	Villarreal	38	20	10	8	71	51	+20	70	Qualification for the Champions League league stage
6	Real Betis	38	16	12	10	57	50	+7	60	Qualification for the Europa League league stage (Note: The 2024–25 Copa del Rey winner qualified for the Europa League league stage. Since the cup winners (Barcelona) qualified based on league position, the Europa League spot was passed to the seventh-placed team, and the Conference League spot was passed to the eighth-placed team.)
7	Celta Vigo	38	16	7	15	59	57	+2	55	Qualification for the Europa League league stage
8	Rayo Vallecano	38	13	13	12	41	45	−4	52 (Note: Rayo Vallecano finished ahead of Osasuna on head-to-head points: Rayo Vallecano 3–1 Osasuna, Osasuna 1–1 Rayo Vallecano.)	Qualification for the Conference League play-off round
9	Osasuna	38	12	16	10	48	52	−4	52	
10	Mallorca	38	13	9	16	35	44	−9	48	
11	Real Sociedad	38	13	7	18	35	46	−11	46 (Note: Real Sociedad finished ahead of Valencia on head-to-head goal difference: Real Sociedad 3–0 Valencia, Valencia 1–0 Real Sociedad.)	
12	Valencia	38	11	13	14	44	54	−10	46	
13	Getafe	38	11	9	18	34	39	−5	42 (Note: Head-to-head points: Getafe 9, Espanyol 9, Alavés 0.)	
14	Espanyol	38	11	9	18	40	51	−11	42	
15	Alavés	38	10	12	16	38	48	−10	42	
16	Girona	38	11	8	19	44	60	−16	41 (Note: Girona finished ahead of Sevilla on head-to-head goal difference: Sevilla 0–2 Girona, Girona 1–2 Sevilla.)	
17	Sevilla	38	10	11	17	42	55	−13	41	
18	Leganés (R)	38	9	13	16	39	56	−17	40	Relegation to Segunda División
19	Las Palmas (R)	38	8	8	22	40	61	−21	32	Relegation to Segunda División
20	Valladolid (R)	38	4	4	30	26	90	−64	16	Relegation to Segunda División

Source: LaLiga EA Sports
Rules for classification: 1) Points; 2) Head-to-head points; 3) Head-to-head goal difference; 4) Goal difference; 5) Goals scored; 6) Fair-play points
(Note: Head-to-head record is used only after all the matches between the teams in question have been played)
(C) Champions; (R) Relegated

== Results ==
Home \ Away	ALA	ATH	ATM	BAR	CEL	ESP	GET	GIR	LPA	LEG	MLL	OSA	RAY	BET	RMA	RSO	SEV	VAL	VLL	VIL
Alavés	—	1–1	0–0	0–3	1–1	0–1	0–1	0–1	2–0	1–1	1–0	1–1	0–2	0–0	0–1	1–0	2–1	1–0	2–3	1–0
Athletic Bilbao	1–0	—	0–1	0–3	3–1	4–1	1–1	3–0	1–0	0–0	1–1	0–0	3–1	1–1	2–1	1–0	1–1	1–0	7–1	2–0
Atlético Madrid	2–1	1–0	—	2–4	1–1	0–0	1–0	3–0	2–0	3–1	2–0	1–0	3–0	4–1	1–1	4–0	4–3	3–0	4–2	1–1
Barcelona	1–0	2–1	1–2	—	4–3	3–1	1–0	4–1	1–2	0–1	1–0	3–0	1–0	1–1	4–3	4–0	5–1	7–1	7–0	2–3
Celta Vigo	2–1	1–2	0–1	2–2	—	0–2	1–0	1–1	1–1	2–1	2–0	1–0	1–2	3–2	1–2	2–0	3–2	3–1	3–1	3–0
Espanyol	3–2	1–1	1–1	0–2	3–1	—	1–0	1–1	2–0	1–1	2–1	0–0	2–1	1–2	1–0	0–1	0–2	1–1	2–1	1–2
Getafe	2–0	0–2	2–1	1–1	1–2	1–0	—	0–1	1–3	1–1	0–1	1–1	0–0	1–2	0–1	0–0	0–0	1–1	2–0	1–2
Girona	0–1	2–1	0–4	1–4	2–2	4–1	1–2	—	2–1	4–3	1–0	4–0	0–0	1–3	0–3	0–1	1–2	1–1	3–0	0–1
Las Palmas	2–2	2–3	1–0	0–2	0–1	1–0	1–2	1–0	—	0–1	2–3	1–1	0–1	1–1	1–1	1–3	2–2	2–3	2–1	1–2
Leganés	3–3	0–2	1–0	0–1	3–0	3–2	1–0	1–1	2–1	—	0–1	1–1	0–1	2–3	0–3	0–3	1–0	0–0	3–0	2–5
Mallorca	1–1	0–0	0–1	1–5	1–2	2–1	1–2	2–1	3–1	0–0	—	1–1	1–0	0–1	1–1	1–0	0–0	2–1	2–1	1–2
Osasuna	2–2	1–2	2–0	4–2	3–2	2–0	1–2	2–1	2–1	1–1	1–0	—	1–1	1–2	1–1	2–1	1–0	3–3	1–0	2–2
Rayo Vallecano	1–0	1–2	1–1	1–2	2–1	0–4	1–0	2–1	1–3	1–1	0–0	3–1	—	2–2	3–3	2–2	1–1	1–1	1–0	0–1
Real Betis	1–3	2–2	1–0	2–2	2–2	1–0	2–1	1–1	1–0	2–0	1–2	1–1	1–1	—	2–1	3–0	2–1	1–1	5–1	1–2
Real Madrid	3–2	1–0	1–1	0–4	3–2	4–1	2–0	2–0	4–1	3–2	2–1	4–0	2–1	2–0	—	2–0	4–2	1–2	3–0	2–0
Real Sociedad	1–2	0–0	1–1	1–0	0–1	2–1	0–3	3–2	0–0	3–0	0–2	0–2	1–2	2–0	0–2	—	0–1	3–0	2–1	1–0
Sevilla	1–1	0–1	1–2	1–4	1–0	1–1	1–0	0–2	1–0	2–2	1–1	1–1	1–0	1–0	0–2	0–2	—	1–1	2–1	1–2
Valencia	2–2	0–1	0–3	1–2	2–1	1–1	3–0	2–0	2–3	2–0	1–0	0–0	0–1	4–2	1–2	1–0	1–0	—	2–1	1–1
Valladolid	0–1	1–1	0–5	1–2	0–1	1–0	0–4	0–1	1–1	0–0	1–2	2–3	1–2	1–0	0–3	0–0	0–4	1–0	—	1–2
Villarreal	3–0	0–0	2–2	1–5	4–3	1–0	1–1	2–2	3–1	3–0	4–0	4–2	1–1	1–2	1–2	2–2	4–2	1–1	5–1	—

Source: La Liga
Legend: Blue = home team win; Yellow = draw; Red = away team win.
For upcoming matches, an "a" indicates there is an article about the rivalry between the two participants.

== Season statistics ==
=== Scoring ===
- First goal of the season:
  (Spain) Oihan Sancet (Athletic Bilbao) against Getafe (15 August 2024)
- Last goal of the season:
  (Spain) Dani Olmo (Barcelona) against Athletic Bilbao (25 May 2025)

=== Top goalscorers ===
Rank	Player	Club	Goals
1	(France) Kylian Mbappé	Real Madrid	31
2	(Poland) Robert Lewandowski	Barcelona	27
3	(Croatia) Ante Budimir	Osasuna	21
4	(Norway) Alexander Sørloth	Atlético Madrid	20
5	(Spain) Ayoze Pérez	Villarreal	19
6	(Brazil) Raphinha	Barcelona	18
7	(Argentina) Julián Alvarez	Atlético Madrid	17
8	(Spain) Oihan Sancet	Athletic Bilbao	15
9	(Spain) Kike García	Alavés	13
10	(Spain) Javi Puado	Espanyol	12

==== Hat-tricks ====
Player	For	Against	Result	Date	Round
(Brazil) Raphinha	Barcelona	Valladolid	7–0 (H)	31 August 2024	4
(Spain) Javi Puado	Espanyol	Alavés	3–2 (H)	14 September 2024	5
(Poland) Robert Lewandowski	Barcelona	Alavés	3–0 (A)	6 October 2024	9
(Brazil) Vinícius Júnior	Real Madrid	Osasuna	4–0 (H)	9 November 2024	13
(France) Thierno Barry	Villarreal	Leganés	5–2 (A)	22 December 2024	18
(Spain) Kike García	Alavés	Real Betis	3–1 (A)	18 January 2025	20
(France) Kylian Mbappé	Real Madrid	Valladolid	3–0 (A)	25 January 2025	21
(Spain) Oihan Sancet	Athletic Bilbao	Girona	3–0 (H)	8 February 2025	23
(Spain) Borja Iglesias	Celta Vigo	Barcelona	3–4 (A)	19 April 2025	32
(Norway) Alexander Sørloth^{4}	Atlético Madrid	Real Sociedad	4–0 (H)	10 May 2025	35
(France) Kylian Mbappé	Real Madrid	Barcelona	3–4 (A)	11 May 2025	35
(Norway) Alexander Sørloth	Atlético Madrid	Girona	4–0 (A)	25 May 2025	38

^{4} – Player scored four goals.

=== Zamora Trophy ===
The Zamora Trophy was awarded by newspaper Marca to the goalkeeper with the lowest goals-to-games ratio. A goalkeeper had to play at least 28 matches of 60 or more minutes to be eligible for the trophy.

Rank	Player	Club	Matches	Goals against	Average
1	(Slovenia) Jan Oblak	Atlético Madrid	36	30	0.83
2	(Belgium) Thibaut Courtois	Real Madrid	30	29	0.97
3	(Spain) David Soria	Getafe	38	39	1.03
4	(Slovakia) Dominik Greif	Mallorca	31	34	1.10
5	(Spain) Álex Remiro	Real Sociedad	36	43	1.19

=== Discipline ===
==== Player ====
- Most yellow cards: 14
  - (Cameroon) Yvan Neyou (Leganés)
- Most red cards: 3
  - (Spain) Mario Martín (Valladolid)

==== Team ====
- Most yellow cards: 107
  - Las Palmas
- Fewest yellow cards: 58
  - Real Madrid
- Most red cards: 8
  - Sevilla
- Fewest red cards: 0
  - Osasuna

== Awards ==
=== Monthly awards ===
Month	Manager of the Month		Player of the Month		U23 Player of the Month		Goal of the Month		Save of the Month		References
Month	Manager	Club	Player	Club	Player	Club	Player	Club	Player	Club	References
August	(Germany) Hansi Flick	Barcelona	(Brazil) Raphinha	Barcelona	(Spain) Lamine Yamal	Barcelona	(Spain) Juan Cruz	Leganés	(Spain) Diego Conde	Villarreal	
September	(Spain) Ernesto Valverde	Athletic Bilbao	(Spain) Lamine Yamal	Barcelona	(Spain) Alberto Moleiro	Las Palmas	(Ghana) Abdul Mumin	Rayo Vallecano	(Serbia) Marko Dmitrović	Leganés	
October	(Germany) Hansi Flick	Barcelona	(Poland) Robert Lewandowski	Barcelona	(Spain) Pedri	Barcelona	(Croatia) Luka Sučić	Real Sociedad	(Slovenia) Jan Oblak	Atlético Madrid	
November	(Spain) Míchel	Girona	(Brazil) Vinícius Júnior	Real Madrid	(Portugal) Fábio Silva	Las Palmas	(Morocco) Munir	Leganés	(Spain) Diego Conde	Villarreal	
December	(Argentina) Diego Simeone	Atlético Madrid	(England) Jude Bellingham	Real Madrid	(Turkey) Arda Güler	Real Madrid	(Czech Republic) Ladislav Krejčí	Girona	(Serbia) Marko Dmitrović	Leganés	
January	(Spain) José Bordalás	Getafe	(France) Kylian Mbappé	Real Madrid	(England) Jude Bellingham	Real Madrid	(Spain) Javi Puado	Espanyol	(Spain) Sergio Herrera	Osasuna	
February	(Germany) Hansi Flick	Barcelona	(Spain) Oihan Sancet	Athletic Bilbao	(Spain) Lamine Yamal	Barcelona	(France) Romain Perraud	Real Betis	(Spain) Joan García	Espanyol	
March	(Chile) Manuel Pellegrini	Real Betis	(Spain) Isco	Real Betis	(Spain) Diego López	Valencia	(Nigeria) Umar Sadiq	Valencia	(Spain) Joan García	Espanyol	
April	(Spain) Manolo González	Espanyol	(Spain) Pedri	Barcelona	(Portugal) Fábio Silva	Las Palmas	(Spain) Nico Williams	Athletic Bilbao	(Norway) Ørjan Nyland	Sevilla	

=== Annual awards ===
Award	Winner	Club	Ref.
Coach of the Season	(Germany) Hansi Flick	Barcelona	
Player of the Season	(Brazil) Raphinha	Barcelona	
U23 Player of the Season	(Spain) Lamine Yamal	Barcelona	
Goal of the Season	(Croatia) Luka Sučić	Real Sociedad	
Save of the Season	(Slovenia) Jan Oblak	Atlético Madrid	

EA SPORTS Team of the Season
Pos.	Player	Club
GK	(Spain) **Joan García**	Espanyol
GK	(Belgium) Thibaut Courtois	Real Madrid
DF	(Germany) **Antonio Rüdiger**	Real Madrid
DF	(Spain) **Iñigo Martínez**	Barcelona
DF	(Spain) **Daniel Vivian**	Athletic Bilbao
DF	(Spain) Pau Cubarsí	Barcelona
DF	(France) Jules Koundé	Barcelona
DF	(Romania) Andrei Rațiu	Rayo Vallecano
MF	(Spain) **Pedri**	Barcelona
MF	(Uruguay) **Federico Valverde**	Real Madrid
MF	(Spain) **Álex Baena**	Villarreal
MF	(England) **Jude Bellingham**	Real Madrid
MF	(Argentina) Rodrigo De Paul	Atlético Madrid
MF	(Spain) Isco	Real Betis
FW	(Spain) **Lamine Yamal**	Barcelona
FW	(Brazil) **Raphinha**	Barcelona
FW	(France) **Kylian Mbappé**	Real Madrid
FW	(Brazil) Vinícius Júnior	Real Madrid
FW	(France) Antoine Griezmann	Atlético Madrid
FW	(Poland) Robert Lewandowski	Barcelona
FW	(Argentina) Julián Alvarez	Atlético Madrid
FW	(Spain) Iago Aspas	Celta Vigo

Players in bold are the main eleven.

== Attendances ==
Real Madrid drew the highest average home attendance in the 2024-25 edition of La Liga.

#	Football club	Home games	Average attendance
1	Real Madrid	19	72,701
2	Atlético de Madrid	19	60,883
3	Real Betis	19	51,542
4	Athletic Club	19	48,401
5	FC Barcelona	19	46,005
6	Valencia CF	19	43,042
7	Sevilla FC	19	35,574
8	Real Sociedad	19	29,877
9	Espanyol	19	25,640
10	UD Las Palmas	19	23,010
11	Celta de Vigo	19	21,504
12	Osasuna	19	20,476
13	Real Valladolid	19	19,829
14	RCD Mallorca	19	18,502
15	Villarreal CF	19	18,267
16	Deportivo Alavés	19	17,318
17	Rayo Vallecano	19	12,908
18	Girona FC	19	11,657
19	Getafe CF	19	11,464
20	CD Leganés	19	11,135

== See also ==
- 2024–25 Copa del Rey
- 2024–25 Segunda División
- 2024–25 Primera Federación
- 2024–25 Segunda Federación
- 2024–25 Tercera Federación
