= La Liga Awards =

Spanish association football awards

The La Liga Awards, previously known as the LFP awards, are presented annually by the Liga de Fútbol Profesional (LFP) to the best players and coach in La Liga, the first division of association football in Spain. Established in the 2008–09 season, they were the first official awards in the history of the Spanish competition. La Liga's best coach and player in each position—goalkeeper, defender, midfielder, and forward—were chosen based on a voting by the captain and vice-captains of each club, while the best player overall was determined via statistical analysis. The gala events and television broadcast were produced in collaboration with audiovisual group Mediapro, whose co-founder Jaume Roures was a registered member (socio) of FC Barcelona.

The awards were discontinued after the 2015–16 season before being officially relaunched for the 2023–24 season under a partnership with EA Sports. In the original era (2008–09 to 2015–16), Barcelona players won 32 honours in the six main categories, almost triple the number of any other club. Barcelona's forward Lionel Messi was named La Liga's best player six times and La Liga's best forward seven times, both all-time records. Across all positions, the other outstanding individuals are Barcelona midfielder Andrés Iniesta with five wins, Barcelona coach Pep Guardiola with four wins, Real Madrid defender Sergio Ramos with four wins, and goalkeepers Iker Casillas of Real Madrid and Víctor Valdés of Barcelona with two wins each.

== Annual awards ==
=== Player of the season ===
Season	Recipient	Club	Ref.
2008–09	(Argentina) Lionel Messi	Barcelona	
2009–10	(Argentina) Lionel Messi (2)	Barcelona	
2010–11	(Argentina) Lionel Messi (3)	Barcelona	
2011–12	(Argentina) Lionel Messi (4)	Barcelona	
2012–13	(Argentina) Lionel Messi (5)	Barcelona	
2013–14	(Portugal) Cristiano Ronaldo	Real Madrid	
2014–15	(Argentina) Lionel Messi (6)	Barcelona	
2015–16	(France) Antoine Griezmann	Atlético Madrid	
2016–17 to 2022–23	Not awarded / Discontinued		
2023–24	(England) Jude Bellingham	Real Madrid	
2024–25	(Brazil) Raphinha	Barcelona	
2025–26	(Spain) Lamine Yamal	Barcelona	

=== Manager of the season ===
Season	Recipient	Club	Ref.
2008–09	(Spain) Pep Guardiola	Barcelona	
2009–10	(Spain) Pep Guardiola (2)	Barcelona	
2010–11	(Spain) Pep Guardiola (3)	Barcelona	
2011–12	(Spain) Pep Guardiola (4)	Barcelona	
2012–13	(Argentina) Diego Simeone	Atlético Madrid	
2013–14	(Argentina) Diego Simeone (2)	Atlético Madrid	
2014–15	(Spain) Luis Enrique	Barcelona	
2015–16	(Argentina) Diego Simeone (3)	Atlético Madrid	
2023–24	(Spain) Míchel	Girona	
2024–25	(Germany) Hansi Flick	Barcelona	
2025–26	(Germany) Hansi Flick (2)	Barcelona	

=== African player of the season ===
Season	Recipient	Club	Ref.
2013–14	(Algeria) Yacine Brahimi	Granada	
2014–15	(Algeria) Sofiane Feghouli	Valencia	
2021–22	(Morocco) Yassine Bounou	Sevilla	
2022–23	(Nigeria) Samuel Chukwueze	Villarreal	
2023–24	(Ghana) Iñaki Williams	Athletic Bilbao	
2024–25	(Ghana) Iñaki Williams (2)	Athletic Bilbao	
2025–26	(Senegal) Pape Gueye	Villarreal	

=== U23 Player of the season ===
Season	Recipient	Club	Ref.
2023–24	(Spain) Lamine Yamal	Barcelona	
2024–25	(Spain) Lamine Yamal (2)	Barcelona	
2025–26	(Spain) Carlos Espí	Levante	

=== Goal of the season ===
Season	Recipient	Club	Score	Against	Date	Ref.
2013–14	(Portugal) Cristiano Ronaldo	Real Madrid	2–2	Valencia	4 May 2014	
2023–24	(Spain) Jesús Areso	Osasuna	3–2	Getafe	21 January 2024	
2024–25	(Croatia) Luka Sučić	Real Sociedad	1–1	Atlético Madrid	6 October 2024	
2025–26	(Turkey) Arda Güler	Real Madrid	4–1	Elche	14 March 2026	

=== Save of the season ===
Season	Recipient	Club	Against	Date	Ref.
2024–25	(Slovenia) Jan Oblak	Atlético Madrid	Real Sociedad	6 October 2024	
2025–26	(Spain) Joan Garcia	Barcelona	Espanyol	3 January 2026	

=== Team of the season ===
Season	Position			
Season	Goalkeeper	Defenders	Midfielders	Forwards
2013–14	(Belgium) Thibaut Courtois (Atlético Madrid)	(Brazil) Filipe Luís (Atlético Madrid) (France) Aymeric Laporte (Athletic Bilbao) (Uruguay) Diego Godín (Atlético Madrid) (Spain) Juanfran (Atlético Madrid)	(Spain) Ander Iturraspe (Athletic Bilbao) (Spain) Gabi (Atlético Madrid) (Spain) Koke (Atlético Madrid) (Croatia) Ivan Rakitić (Sevilla)	(Spain) Diego Costa (Atlético Madrid) (Portugal) Cristiano Ronaldo (Real Madrid)
2014–15	(Chile) Claudio Bravo (Barcelona)	(Spain) Jordi Alba (Barcelona) (Argentina) Nicolás Otamendi (Valencia) (Spain) Gerard Piqué (Barcelona) (Brazil) Dani Alves (Barcelona)	(Poland) Grzegorz Krychowiak (Sevilla) (Croatia) Ivan Rakitić (Barcelona) (Colombia) James Rodríguez (Real Madrid)	(Portugal) Cristiano Ronaldo (Real Madrid) (France) Antoine Griezmann (Athletico Madrid) (Argentina) Lionel Messi (Barcelona)
2015–16	(Slovenia) Jan Oblak (Atlético Madrid)	(Brazil) Marcelo (Real Madrid) (Uruguay) Diego Godín (Atlético Madrid) (Spain) Gerard Piqué (Barcelona) (Spain) Sergio Ramos (Real Madrid)	(Spain) Andrés Iniesta (Barcelona) (Spain) Sergio Busquets (Barcelona) (Croatia) Luka Modrić (Real Madrid)	(Portugal) Cristiano Ronaldo (Real Madrid) (Uruguay) Luis Suárez (Barcelona) (Argentina) Lionel Messi (Barcelona)
2021–22	(Belgium) Thibaut Courtois (Real Madrid)	(Argentina) Marcos Acuña (Sevilla) (Austria) David Alaba (Real Madrid) (France) Jules Koundé (Sevilla) (Brazil) Éder Militão (Real Madrid) (Uruguay) Ronald Araújo (Barcelona)	(Spain) Sergio Canales (Real Betis) (France) Nabil Fekir (Real Betis) (Croatia) Luka Modrić (Real Madrid) (Spain) Iker Muniain (Athletic Bilbao) (Spain) Pedri (Barcelona)	(France) Karim Benzema (Real Madrid) (Spain) Raúl de Tomás (Espanyol) (Portugal) João Félix (Atlético Madrid) (Brazil) Vinícius Júnior (Real Madrid)
2022–23	(Germany) Marc-André ter Stegen (Barcelona)	(Spain) Alejandro Balde (Barcelona) (France) Jules Koundé (Barcelona) (Brazil) Éder Militão (Real Madrid) (Spain) David García (Osasuna) (Argentina) Nahuel Molina (Atlético Madrid)	(Spain) Gabri Veiga (Celta Vigo) (Uruguay) Federico Valverde (Real Madrid) (Spain) Mikel Merino (Real Sociedad) (Spain) Pedri (Barcelona) (Croatia) Luka Modrić (Real Madrid)	(France) Antoine Griezmann (Atlético Madrid) (France) Karim Benzema (Real Madrid) (Poland) Robert Lewandowski (Barcelona) (Brazil) Vinícius Júnior (Real Madrid)
2023–24	(Spain) Unai Simón (Athletic Bilbao)	(Spain) Miguel Gutiérrez (Girona) (Germany) Antonio Rüdiger (Real Madrid) (Uruguay) Ronald Araújo (Barcelona) (Spain) Dani Carvajal (Real Madrid)	(England) Jude Bellingham (Real Madrid) (Uruguay) Federico Valverde (Real Madrid) (Spain) Isco (Real Betis) (Germany) İlkay Gündoğan (Barcelona) (Spain) Aleix García (Girona)	(France) Antoine Griezmann (Atlético Madrid) (Ukraine) Artem Dovbyk (Girona) (Brazil) Savinho (Girona) (Poland) Robert Lewandowski (Barcelona) (Brazil) Vinícius Júnior (Real Madrid)
2024–25	(Spain) Joan Garcia (Espanyol)	(Germany) Antonio Rüdiger (Real Madrid) (Spain) Iñigo Martínez (Barcelona) (Spain) Daniel Vivian (Athletic Bilbao)	(Spain) Álex Baena (Villarreal) (Uruguay) Federico Valverde (Real Madrid) (England) Jude Bellingham (Real Madrid) (Spain) Pedri (Barcelona)	(Brazil) Raphinha (Barcelona) (France) Kylian Mbappé (Real Madrid) (Spain) Lamine Yamal (Barcelona)
2025–26	(Spain) Joan Garcia (Barcelona)	(Uruguay) Santiago Mouriño (Villarreal) (Spain) Eric García (Barcelona) (Spain) Marcos Llorente (Atlético Madrid) (Spain) Carlos Romero (Espanyol)	(Spain) Pedri (Barcelona) (Uruguay) Federico Valverde (Real Madrid) (France) Aurélien Tchouaméni (Real Madrid)	(Kosovo) Vedat Muriqi (Mallorca) (France) Kylian Mbappé (Real Madrid) (Spain) Lamine Yamal (Barcelona)

== Discontinued awards ==
=== Best Forward ===
Season	Recipient	Club	Ref.
2008–09	(Argentina) Lionel Messi	Barcelona	
2009–10	(Argentina) Lionel Messi	Barcelona	
2010–11	(Argentina) Lionel Messi	Barcelona	
2011–12	(Argentina) Lionel Messi	Barcelona	
2012–13	(Argentina) Lionel Messi	Barcelona	
2013–14	(Portugal) Cristiano Ronaldo	Real Madrid	
2014–15	(Argentina) Lionel Messi	Barcelona	
2015–16	(Argentina) Lionel Messi	Barcelona	

=== Goalkeeper of the season ===
Season	Recipient	Club	Ref.
2008–09	(Spain) Iker Casillas	Real Madrid	
2009–10	(Spain) Víctor Valdés	Barcelona	
2010–11	(Spain) Víctor Valdés	Barcelona	
2011–12	(Spain) Iker Casillas	Real Madrid	
2012–13	(Belgium) Thibaut Courtois	Atlético Madrid	
2013–14	(Costa Rica) Keylor Navas	Levante	
2014–15	(Chile) Claudio Bravo	Barcelona	
2015–16	(Slovenia) Jan Oblak	Atlético Madrid	

=== Best Attacking Midfielder ===
Season	Recipient	Club	Ref.
2008–09	(Spain) Andrés Iniesta	Barcelona	
2009–10	(Spain) Jesús Navas	Sevilla	
2010–11	(Spain) Andrés Iniesta	Barcelona	
2011–12	(Spain) Andrés Iniesta	Barcelona	
2012–13	(Spain) Andrés Iniesta	Barcelona	
2013–14	(Spain) Andrés Iniesta	Barcelona	

=== Best Midfielder ===
Season	Recipient	Club	Ref.
2008–09	(Spain) Xavi	Barcelona	
2009–10	(Spain) Xavi	Barcelona	
2010–11	(Spain) Xavi	Barcelona	
2011–12	(Spain) Xabi Alonso	Real Madrid	
2012–13	(Spain) Asier Illarramendi	Real Sociedad	
2013–14	(Croatia) Luka Modrić	Real Madrid	
2014–15	(Colombia) James Rodríguez	Real Madrid	
2015–16	(Croatia) Luka Modrić	Real Madrid	

=== Best Defender ===
Season	Recipient	Club	Ref.
2008–09	(Brazil) Dani Alves	Barcelona	
2009–10	(Spain) Gerard Piqué	Barcelona	
2010–11	(France) Eric Abidal	Barcelona	
2011–12	(Spain) Sergio Ramos	Real Madrid	
2012–13	(Spain) Sergio Ramos	Real Madrid	
2013–14	(Spain) Sergio Ramos	Real Madrid	
2014–15	(Spain) Sergio Ramos	Real Madrid	
2015–16	(Uruguay) Diego Godín	Atlético Madrid	

=== Fair Play ===
Season	Recipient	Club	Ref.
2008–09	(Spain) Juan Carlos Valerón	Deportivo La Coruña	
2009–10	(Spain) Marcos Senna	Villarreal	
2010–11	(Spain) Alberto Rivera	Sporting Gijón	
2011–12	(Spain) Carles Puyol	Barcelona	
2012–13	(Spain) Iker Casillas	Real Madrid	
2013–14	(Croatia) Ivan Rakitić	Sevilla	

=== Breakthrough Player ===
Season	Recipient	Club	Ref.
2008–09	(Spain) Sergio Busquets	Barcelona	
2009–10	(Spain) Pedro	Barcelona	
2010–11	(Spain) Iker Muniain	Athletic Bilbao	
2011–12	(Spain) Isco	Málaga	
2012–13	(Spain) Asier Illarramendi	Real Sociedad	
2013–14	(Brazil) Rafinha	Celta Vigo	
2015–16	(Spain) Marco Asensio	Espanyol	

=== Best American Player ===
Season	Recipient	Club	Ref.
2013–14	(Colombia) Carlos Bacca	Sevilla	
2014–15	(Brazil) Neymar	Barcelona	

=== Fans' Five-Star Player ===
Season	Recipient	Club	Ref.
2014–15	(Portugal) Cristiano Ronaldo	Real Madrid	
2015–16	(France) Antoine Griezmann	Atlético Madrid	

=== Play of the Month ===
Key
Italics	Home team

Month	Year	Player(s)	Club	Score (Note: The score at the time of the play. Player's club's score listed first.)	Opponent	Date	Ref.
August	2023	(Spain) Nico Williams (Spain) Gorka Guruzeta	Athletic Bilbao	2–0	Osasuna	19 August 2023	
September	2023	(Uruguay) Federico Valverde (Spain) Fran García	Real Madrid	1–1	Real Sociedad	17 September 2023	
October	2023	(Spain) Gerard Gumbau (Spain) Bryan Zaragoza	Granada	2–0	Barcelona	8 October 2023	
November	2023	(Spain) Alberto Moleiro (Spain) Kirian Rodríguez	Las Palmas	1–0	Atlético Madrid	3 November 2023	
December	2023	(Spain) Nico Williams (Spain) Iñigo Lekue	Athletic Bilbao	2–0	Atlético Madrid	16 December 2023	
January	2024	(Spain) Ferran Torres (Portugal) João Félix	Barcelona	3–2	Real Betis	21 January 2024	
February	2024	(Spain) Álex Sola (Spain) Samu Omorodion	Alavés	1–2	Barcelona	3 February 2024	
March	2024	(Spain) Mikel Oyarzabal (Spain) Mikel Merino	Real Sociedad	2–0	Cádiz	15 March 2024	
April	2024	(Spain) Isco (France) Nabil Fekir	Real Betis	2–1	Celta Vigo	12 April 2024	

=== Others ===
The following awards were only presented once:

Season	Award	Recipient	Club	Ref.
2012–13	Most Valuable Player	(Portugal) Cristiano Ronaldo	Real Madrid	
2015–16	World Player	(Uruguay) Luis Suárez	Barcelona	

== See also ==
- Don Balón Award
- Miguel Muñoz Trophy
- Trofeo Alfredo Di Stéfano
- Trofeo Aldo Rovira
- Trofeo EFE
- Ricardo Zamora Trophy
- Pichichi Trophy
- Zarra Trophy
