= 2021–22 UD Las Palmas season =

UD Las Palmas
2021–22 season
- President: Miguel Ángel Ramírez
- Head coach: Pepe Mel (until 23 January); García Pimienta (from 24 January)
- Stadium: Estadio Gran Canaria
- Segunda División: 4th
- Copa del Rey: Second round
- Top goalscorer: League: Jonathan Viera (14); All: Jonathan Viera (14)
Home colours	Away colours

The 2021–22 season was the 73rd season in the existence of UD Las Palmas and the club's fourth consecutive season in the second division of Spanish football. In addition to the domestic league, Las Palmas participated in this season's edition of the Copa del Rey.

== Players ==
=== First-team squad ===
As of 25 January 2022.

Note: Flags indicate national team as defined under FIFA eligibility rules; some limited exceptions apply. Players may hold more than one non-FIFA nationality.

No.	Pos.	Nation	Player
1	GK	ESP	Raúl Fernández
2	DF	ESP	Álex Díez
3	FW	POR	Hernâni Fortes
4	DF	ESP	Álex Suárez
5	DF	ECU	Erick Ferigra
6	DF	ESP	Eric Curbelo
7	FW	VEN	Adalberto Peñaranda (on loan from Watford)
8	MF	ESP	Maikel Mesa (captain)
9	FW	ESP	Rafa Mújica
10	FW	ESP	Jesé (vice-captain)
11	FW	ESP	Benito Ramírez
12	MF	FRA	Enzo Loiodice
13	GK	ESP	Álvaro Valles
14	DF	ESP	Álvaro Lemos
15	MF	ESP	Fabio González
16	DF	ESP	Raúl Navas (3rd captain)
17	MF	ESP	Óscar Clemente

No.	Pos.	Nation	Player
18	FW	ESP	Pinchi
19	FW	ALB	Armando Sadiku
20	MF	ESP	Kirian Rodríguez
21	MF	ESP	Jonathan Viera
22	MF	COD	Omenuke Mfulu
23	DF	ESP	Unai Veiga
24	FW	ESP	Pejiño
25	FW	ESP	Rober (on loan from Betis)
27	FW	ESP	Ale García
28	MF	ESP	Alberto Moleiro
29	DF	GEQ	Saúl Coco
30	DF	ESP	Sergi Cardona
31	GK	ESP	Alfonso Liceras
32	MF	ESP	Pol Salvador
33	DF	ESP	David Vicente
34	DF	ESP	Isaac Hernández

=== Reserve team ===
Note: Flags indicate national team as defined under FIFA eligibility rules; some limited exceptions apply. Players may hold more than one non-FIFA nationality.

No.	Pos.	Nation	Player
35	MF	ESP	Sato
36	GK	ESP	Javier Cendón

=== Out on loan ===
Note: Flags indicate national team as defined under FIFA eligibility rules; some limited exceptions apply. Players may hold more than one non-FIFA nationality.

No.	Pos.	Nation	Player
—	GK	ESP	Álex Domínguez (at Ibiza until 30 June 2022)
—	FW	GBS	Claudio Mendes (at Rayo Majadahonda until 30 June 2022)

== Pre-season and friendlies ==
Win Draw Loss Fixtures

21 July 2021 Friendly	Espanyol	0–1	Las Palmas	Cornellà de Llobregat, Spain
19:00 CEST (UTC+2)			Mújica 80'	Stadium: RCDE Stadium; Referee: Juan Antonio Manrique Antequera

26 July 2021 Friendly	Las Palmas	3–2	Wolverhampton Wanderers	Marbella, Spain
19:00 CEST (UTC+2)	García 39'; Peñaranda 45'; Jesé 72'		Hoever 53'; Gibbs-White 83'	Stadium: Marbella Football Center; Referee: Expósito Amarillo

27 July 2021 Friendly	Cádiz	0–2	Las Palmas	San Pedro de Alcántara, Spain
19:00 CEST (UTC+2)		Report	Pejiño 8'; Mesa 26'	Stadium: Marbella Football Center; Referee: José María Aranda Delgado

== Competitions ==
=== Overall record ===
Competition	First match	Last match	Starting round	Final position	Record							
Competition	First match	Last match	Starting round	Final position	Pld	W	D	L	GF	GA	GD	Win %
Segunda División	15 August 2021	29 May 2022	Matchday 1	4th	42	19	13	10	57	47	+10	45.24
Segunda División promotion play-offs	1 June 2022	4 June 2022	Semi-finals	Semi-finals	2	0	0	2	1	3	−2	0.00
Copa del Rey	2 December 2021	15 December 2021	First round	Second round	2	1	0	1	4	5	−1	50.00
Total					46	20	13	13	62	55	+7	43.48

Source: Soccerway

=== Segunda División ===
==== League table ====
Pos	Team	Pld	W	D	L	GF	GA	GD	Pts	Qualification or relegation
2	Valladolid (P)	42	24	9	9	71	43	+28	81 (Note: Almería finished ahead of Valladolid on head-to-head points: Almería 3–1 Valladolid, Valladolid 2–2 Almería.)	Promotion to La Liga
3	Eibar	42	23	11	8	61	45	+16	80	Qualification for promotion play-offs
4	Las Palmas	42	19	13	10	57	47	+10	70	Qualification for promotion play-offs
5	Tenerife	42	20	9	13	53	37	+16	69	Qualification for promotion play-offs
6	Girona (O, P)	42	20	8	14	57	42	+15	68 (Note: Girona finished ahead of Oviedo on head-to-head points: Girona 2–1 Oviedo, Oviedo 0–0 Girona.)	Qualification for promotion play-offs

Source: LaLiga SmartBank
Rules for classification: 1) points; 2) head-to-head points; 3) head-to-head goal difference; 4) goal difference; 5) number of goals scored
(O) Play-off winners; (P) Promoted

==== Results summary ====
Overall								Home						Away					
Pld	W	D	L	GF	GA	GD	Pts	W	D	L	GF	GA	GD	W	D	L	GF	GA	GD
42	19	13	10	57	47	+10	70	12	5	4	34	23	+11	7	8	6	23	24	−1

Last updated: 29 May 2022.
Source: La Liga SmartBank

==== Results by round ====
Round	1	2	3	4	5	6	7	8	9	10	11	12	13	14	15	16	17	18	19	20	21	22	23	24	25	26	27	28	29	30	31	32	33	34	35	36	37	38	39	40	41	42
Ground	H	A	H	A	H	A	H																																			
Result	D	D	W	L	D	D																																				
Position	10	14	8	13	13	13	11	6	6	5	6	4	4	3	4	5	6	6	6	6	7	7	7	8	9	7	7	8	9	11	14	9	8	8	7	7	8	8	8	7	6	4

Updated to match(es) played on 29 May 2022. Source: La Liga SmartBank
A = Away; H = Home; W = Win; D = Draw; L = Loss

==== Matches ====
The league fixtures were announced on 30 June 2021.

15 August 2021 1	Las Palmas	1–1	Valladolid	Las Palmas
21:00 WEST (UTC+1)	Jesé 64'	Report	Marcos André 53'	Stadium: Estadio Gran Canaria; Referee: Dámaso Arcediano Monescillo

22 August 2021 2	Girona	0–0	Las Palmas	Girona
19:30 CEST (UTC+2)		Report		Stadium: Montilivi; Attendance: 2,163; Referee: Luis Mario Milla Alvendiz

27 August 2021 3	Las Palmas	2–1	Huesca	Las Palmas
19:00 WEST (UTC+1)	Jesé 6' (pen.); Pejiño 14'	Report	Miguel 90+4'	Stadium: Estadio Gran Canaria; Referee: Javier Iglesias Villanueva

5 September 2021 4	Mirandés	4–2	Las Palmas	Miranda de Ebro
18:15 CEST (UTC+2)	Camello 9', 20'; Vicente 26'; Riquelme 75'	Report	Pejiño 23', 53'	Stadium: Estadio Municipal de Anduva; Referee: Rafael Sánchez López

11 September 2021 5	Las Palmas	1–1	Ibiza	Las Palmas
17:15 WEST (UTC+1)	Moleiro 68'	Report	Castel 12'	Stadium: Estadio Gran Canaria; Attendance: 11,726; Referee: Víctor García Verdura

20 September 2021 6	Burgos	0–0	Las Palmas	Burgos
21:00 CEST (UTC+2)				Stadium: Estadio El Plantío

25 September 2021 7	Las Palmas	2–1	Ponferradina	Las Palmas
17:15 WEST (UTC+1)				Stadium: Estadio Gran Canaria

3 October 2021 8	Las Palmas	4–1	FC Cartagena	Las Palmas
18:15 WEST (UTC+1)	Fabio González (yellow card) 23'; Jonathan Viera 32' (pen.); Pejiño 36'; Jesé 43'; Peñaranda 72' (yellow card) 88'; Sergi Cardona (yellow card) 90+1'	Report	David Andújar (yellow card) 25'; Álex Gallar (yellow card) 29'; Boateng (yellow card) 45+4' (yellow-red card) 63'; Dauda 83'	Stadium: Estadio Gran Canaria; Attendance: 11,873; Referee: (Spain) Oliver De La Fuente

9 October 2021 9	Almería	1–1	Las Palmas	Almería
18:15 WEST (UTC+1)	Chumi (yellow card) 21'; Portillo 32'; Dyego Sousa (yellow card) 84'	Report	Sergi Cardona (yellow card) 36'; Ferigra (yellow card) 56'; Eric Curbelo (yellow card) 67'; Loiodice (yellow card) 73'; Jonathan Viera 90'	Stadium: Estadio de los Juegos Mediterráneos; Attendance: 8,734; Referee: (Spain) Saúl Ais Reig

16 October 2021 10	Las Palmas	2–1	Tenerife	Las Palmas
18:15 WEST (UTC+1)	Jonathan Viera 26'; Loiodice (yellow card) 54'; Eric Curbelo (yellow card) 63'; Raúl Fernández (yellow card) 82'; Álvaro Lemos 90+2'	Report	Carlos Ruiz (yellow card) 16'; Elady Zorrilla 65'; Álex Bermejo (yellow card) 70'; Álex Muñoz (yellow card) 77'; Moore (yellow card) 80'; Víctor Mollejo (yellow card) 90+4'	Stadium: Estadio Gran Canaria; Attendance: 25,887; Referee: (Spain) Eduardo Prieto Iglesias

20 October 2021 11	Lugo	2–0	Las Palmas	Lugo
21:00 WEST (UTC+1)	Ferigra 5' (o.g.); Ricard Sánchez (yellow card) 7'; Xavi Torres 33'; Chris Ramos (yellow card) 43'; Joselu (yellow card) 60'; Diego Alende (yellow card) 64'; Edu Campabadal (yellow card) 68'; Josep Señé (yellow card) 80'	Report	Sergi Cardona (yellow card) 27'; Maikel Mesa (yellow card) 69'; Óscar Clemente (yellow card) 72'; Eric Curbelo (yellow card) 77'; Álvaro Lemos (yellow card) 88'	Stadium: Estadio Anxo Carro; Attendance: 2,110; Referee: (Spain) Rubén Ávalos Barrera

24 October 2021 12	Las Palmas	3–0	Alcorcón	Las Palmas
21:00 WEST (UTC+1)	Loiodice 23'; Benito Ramírez 58'; Eric Curbelo 72'	Report	Asier Córdoba (red card) 8'; Carlos Hernández (yellow card) 61'	Stadium: Estadio Gran Canaria; Attendance: 8,936; Referee: (Spain) Iván Caparrós Hernández

29 October 2021 13	Real Sociedad B	0–1	Las Palmas	San Sebastián
21:00 WEST (UTC+1)	Jon Karrikaburu (yellow card) 78'	Report	Jesé 35'; Fabio González (yellow card) 80'	Stadium: Reale Arena; Attendance: 2,320; Referee: (Spain) Dámaso Arcediano Monescillo

3 November 2021 14	Las Palmas	2–1	Fuenlabrada	Las Palmas
21:15 CET (UTC+1)	Jesé 34' 43' (pen.); Eric Curbelo (yellow card) 46'; Benito Ramírez (yellow card) 60'; Álvaro Lemos (yellow card) 70'; Fabio González (yellow card) 90+6'	Report	Fuentes (yellow card) 10'; Pol Valentín (yellow card) 41'; Adrián Diéguez (yellow card) 51' (yellow-red card) 51'; Cristóbal (yellow card) 76'; Zozulya 79'; Arturo Molina (yellow card) 90+5'	Stadium: Estadio Gran Canaria; Attendance: 8,714; Referee: (Spain) Luis Milla Alvendiz

6 November 2021 15	Real Oviedo	1–1	Las Palmas	Oviedo
18:15 CET (UTC+1)	Borja Bastón 21' (pen.); Obeng (yellow card) 30'; Viti (yellow card) 31'; Dani Calvo (yellow card) 43'; Jorge Pombo (yellow card) 90'	Report	Kirian Rodríguez 72'; Eric Curbelo (yellow card) 87'	Stadium: Estadio Carlos Tartiere; Attendance: 9,139; Referee: (Spain) Francisco Hernández Maeso

13 November 2021 16	Las Palmas	2–3	Zaragoza	Las Palmas
20:30 CET (UTC+1)	Jonathan Viera 23' (yellow card) 90+4'; Benito Ramírez 67'; Álex Suárez (yellow card) 90+1'	Report	Sergio Bermejo 33'; Álvaro Giménez 54' 75'; Lluís López (yellow card) 69'; Fran Gámez (yellow card) 82'	Stadium: Estadio Gran Canaria; Attendance: 13,432; Referee: (Spain) Álvaro Moreno Aragón

20 November 2021 17	Málaga	2–1	Las Palmas	Málaga
18:15 CET (UTC+1)	Antoñín 30' (yellow card) 55'; Alberto Escassi (yellow card) 48'; Gassama 86'	Report	Loiodice (yellow card) 17' (yellow-red card) 52'; Benito Ramírez 77'; Fabio González (yellow card) 83'	Stadium: La Rosaleda; Attendance: 22,128; Referee: (Spain) Eduardo Prieto Iglesias

28 November 2021 18	Leganés	4–1	Las Palmas	Leganés
14:00 CET (UTC+1)	Recio (yellow card) 24'; Sergi Cardona 30' (o.g.); Borja Garcés 44' (pen.); Javi Hernández (yellow card) 61'; Ranđelović 68'; Sabin Merino (yellow card) 86' (goal) 89'	Report	Saúl Coco (yellow card) 42'; Jonathan Viera (yellow card) 45' (goal) 85'	Stadium: Estadio Municipal de Butarque; Attendance: 7,008; Referee: (Spain) Rubén Ávalos Barrera

5 December 2021 19	Las Palmas	1–0	Sporting Gijón	Las Palmas
20:30 CET (UTC+1)	Sergi Cardona (yellow card) 45+1'; Loiodice (yellow card) 53'; Juan Berrocal 72' (o.g.); Raúl Navas (yellow card) 79'; Álvaro Lemos (yellow card) 90'	Report	Borja López (yellow card) 43'; José Gragera (yellow card) 56'; Rodríguez (yellow card) 74'	Stadium: Estadio Gran Canaria; Attendance: 11,539; Referee: (Spain) Dámaso Arcediano Monescillo

12 December 2021 20	Amorebieta	1–1	Las Palmas	Amorebieta-Etxano
18:15 CET (UTC+1)	Gorka Guruzeta 2'; Iker Bilbao (yellow card) 57'; Aimar Sagastibelza (yellow card) 66'	Report	Alberto Moleiro 27'	Stadium: Urritxe; Attendance: 1,097; Referee: (Spain) Álvaro Moreno Aragón

18 December 2021 21	Las Palmas	0–1	Eibar	Las Palmas
18:15 CET (UTC+1)	Eric Curbelo (yellow card) 45'; Alberto Moleiro (yellow card) 65'; Álex Díez (yellow card) 69'; Raúl Navas (yellow card) 74'; Peñaranda (yellow card) 90+6'	Report	Javi Muñoz (yellow card) 13'; Sergio Álvarez (yellow card) 26'; Stoichkov 35'; Álvaro Tejero (yellow card) 47'; Arbilla (yellow card) 65'; Blanco (yellow card) 90+4'; Olabe (yellow card) 90+5'	Stadium: Estadio Gran Canaria; Attendance: 10,331; Referee: (Spain) Eduardo Prieto Iglesias

2 January 2022 22	Tenerife	0–1	Las Palmas	Santa Cruz de Tenerife
21:30 CET (UTC+1)	Aitor Sanz (yellow card) 58'	Report	Álex Díez (yellow card) 45+2'; Kirian Rodríguez 72'; Raúl Fernández (yellow card) 90+2'	Stadium: Estadio Heliodoro Rodríguez López; Attendance: 10,756; Referee: (Spain) Jon González Esteban

9 January 2022 23	Las Palmas	1–1	Almería	Las Palmas
21:30 CET (UTC+1)	Jonathan Viera 37' (yellow card) 52'; Sergi Cardona (yellow card) 54'; Pinchi (yellow card) 59'; Peñaranda (yellow card) 90+2'	Report	Robertone (yellow card) 18'; Appiah 51'; César de la Hoz (yellow card) 55'; Babić (yellow card) 61'	Stadium: Estadio Gran Canaria; Attendance: 9,827; Referee: (Spain) David Gálvez Rascón

22 January 2022 24	Fuenlabrada	3–2	Las Palmas	Fuenlabrada
18:15 CET (UTC+1)	Pedro León 11' (pen.) (yellow card) 85'; Konaté (yellow card) 27' (goal) 60'; Raúl Navas 87' (o.g.); Adrián (yellow card) 90+1'	Report	Óscar Clemente 21'; Mfulu (yellow card) 30'; Jesé 77' (pen.)	Stadium: Estadio Fernando Torres; Attendance: 2,554; Referee: (Spain) Francisco Hernández Maeso

30 January 2022 25	Las Palmas	0–0	Real Sociedad B	Las Palmas
18:15 CET (UTC+2)	Cardona (yellow card) 85'		Turrientes (yellow card) 41'; Clemente (yellow card) 69'; Magunazelaia (yellow card) 76'; Gabilondo (yellow card) 78'	Stadium: Estadio Gran Canaria; Attendance: 11,030; Referee: (Spain) Alejandro Quintero

6 February 2022 26	FC Cartagena	0–2	Las Palmas	Cartagena
18:15 CET (UTC+2)	Cristóforo (yellow card) 69'; Gastón Silva (yellow card) 74'	Report	Jonathan Viera 17' (pen.); Jesé 28' (yellow card) 87'; Mfulu (yellow card) 39'; Maikel Mesa (yellow card) 67'; Sergi Cardona (yellow card) 90+3'	Stadium: Estadio Cartagonova; Attendance: 9,382; Referee: (Spain) Oliver De La Fuente

13 February 2022 27	Las Palmas	0–2	Burgos	Las Palmas
21:00 CET (UTC+2)	Raúl Navas (yellow card) 45+1'; Loiodice (yellow card) 63'	Report	Grego (yellow card) 7'; Aitor Córdoba 48'; Unai Elgezabal (yellow card) 56'; Andy 71'	Stadium: Estadio Gran Canaria; Attendance: 9,803; Referee: (Spain) Gorka Sagués Oscoz

19 February 2022 28	Zaragoza	2–1	Las Palmas	Zaragoza
16:00 CET (UTC+1)	Jaume Grau 5' (yellow card) 72'; Fran Gámez (yellow card) 10'; Pep Chavarría (yellow card) 43'; Alejandro Francés (yellow card) 63'; Álvaro Giménez 69' (yellow card) 82'	Report	Mfulu (yellow card) 4'; Maikel Mesa (yellow card) 17' (goal) 55'; Eric Curbelo (yellow card) 24'; Sergi Cardona (yellow card) 60'	Stadium: La Romareda; Attendance: 14,898; Referee: (Spain) Iván Caparrós Hernández

26 February 2022 29	Las Palmas	2–2	Lugo	Las Palmas
21:00 CET (UTC+1)	Álvaro Lemos (yellow card) 24'; Rafa Mújica 27'; Diego Alende 45' (o.g.); Mfulu (yellow card) 79'	Report	Sebas Moyano 23'; Diego Alende (yellow card) 39'; Fernando Seoane (yellow card) 67'; Carlos Pita (yellow card) 83'; Chris Ramos 89'	Stadium: Estadio Gran Canaria; Attendance: 6,675; Referee: (Spain) Alejandro Quintero González

5 March 2022 30	Huesca	0–0	Las Palmas	Huesca
16:00 CET (UTC+1)	Dani Escriche (yellow card) 33'; Timor (yellow card) 69'; Darío Poveda (yellow card) 76'; Joaquín Muñoz (yellow card) 81'	Report		Stadium: Estadio El Alcoraz; Attendance: 6,084; Referee: (Spain) Aitor Gorostegui Fernández

12 March 2022 31	Las Palmas	1–3	Girona	Las Palmas
18:15 CET (UTC+1)	Jesé 12' (pen.); Rafa Mújica (yellow card) 21' (yellow-red card) 37'; Álvaro Lemos (yellow card) 44'; Maikel Mesa (yellow card) 68'; Fabio González (yellow card) 71'; Raúl Navas (red card) 77'; Peñaranda (yellow card) 81'; Rober (yellow card) 84'; Saúl Coco (yellow card) 90+6'	Report	Aleix García (yellow card) 12'; Samuel Sáiz (yellow card) 28'; Bustos 62' 65'; Álex Baena (yellow card) 83'; Valery 90+3'	Stadium: Estadio Gran Canaria; Attendance: 12,591; Referee: (Spain) Dámaso Arcediano Monescillo

19 March 2022 32	Real Valladolid	0–1	Las Palmas	Valladolid
18:15 CET (UTC+1)	Roque Mesa (yellow card) 69'; Luis Pérez (yellow card) 77'; Weissman (yellow card) 85'	Report	Alberto Moleiro (yellow card) 38'; Sadiku 61'; Saúl Coco (yellow card) 90+6'	Stadium: Estadio José Zorrilla; Attendance: 15,252; Referee: (Spain) Luis Milla Alvendiz

28 March 2022 33	Las Palmas	4–2	Leganés	Las Palmas
21:00 CET (UTC+1)	Sadiku 23' 75'; Kirian Rodríguez 26'; Saúl Coco (yellow card) 27'; Jonathan Viera 37' (pen.); Eric Curbelo (yellow card) 88'	Report	Qasmi 20' (yellow card) 42'; Cissé (yellow card) 36'; Nyom (yellow card) 39'; Sergi Palencia (yellow card) 53'; Giraudon (yellow card) 57'; Álvaro Lemos 70' (o.g.); Rubén Pardo (yellow card) 80'	Stadium: Estadio Gran Canaria; Attendance: 6,961; Referee: (Spain) Javier Iglesias Villanueva

3 April 2022 34	Ponferradina	1–2	Las Palmas	Ponferrada
16:00 CET (UTC+1)	Cristian Rodríguez (yellow card) 22'; Yuri 23'; Pașcanu (yellow card) 45+3' (yellow-red card) 75'	Report	Sergi Cardona (yellow card) 41'; Pinchi (yellow card) 45+2'; Sadiku (yellow card) 45+3'; Kirian Rodríguez 86'; Rober 90+4' (yellow card) 90+5'	Stadium: Estadio El Toralín; Attendance: 5,745; Referee: (Spain) Aitor Gorostegui Fernández

9 April 2022 35	Las Palmas	1–0	Amorebieta	Las Palmas
21:00 CET (UTC+1)	Kirian Rodríguez 48'; Sadiku (yellow card) 90'; Fabio González (yellow card) 90+2'	Report	Aitor Aldalur (yellow card) 25'; Javi Ros (yellow card) 31'; Óscar Gil (yellow card) 76'	Stadium: Estadio Gran Canaria; Attendance: 12,825; Referee: (Spain) Víctor García Verdura

15 April 2022 36	Eibar	2–2	Las Palmas	Eibar
18:30 CET (UTC+1)	Stoichkov 4'; Etxeita (yellow card) 70'; Chema (yellow card) 76'; Llorente 80'	Report	Sadiku 22'; Jesé (yellow card) 23' (goal) 45' (pen.); Álvaro Lemos (yellow card) 70'; Fabio González (yellow card) 90+2'	Stadium: Ipurua; Attendance: 4,110; Referee: (Spain) José López Toca

24 April 2022 37	Ibiza	1–1	Las Palmas	Ibiza
16:15 CET (UTC+1)	Diop (yellow card) 29'; Ekain Zenitagoia (yellow card) 31'; Escobar (yellow card) 53'; David Goldar 62'; Juan Ibiza (yellow card) 89'; Álvaro Jiménez (yellow card) 90+6'	Report	Sadiku (yellow card) 24'; Jonathan Viera 41' (yellow card) 58'	Stadium: Estadi Municipal de Can Misses; Referee: (Spain) Gorka Sagués Oscoz

29 April 2022 38	Las Palmas	2–1	Málaga	Las Palmas
21:00 WEST (UTC+1)	Jonathan Viera 24'; Mfulu (yellow card) 77'; Jesé 79'	Report	Cufré (yellow card) 51'; Víctor Gómez (yellow card) 55' (yellow-red card) 90+3'; Febas 85'; Thomas (yellow card) 90+5'	Stadium: Estadio Gran Canaria; Attendance: 10,644; Referee: (Spain) Oliver De La Fuente

6 May 2022 39	Las Palmas	1–0	Mirandés	Las Palmas
20:00 WEST (UTC+1)	Jonathan Viera 18'; Sergi Cardona (yellow card) 35'; Fabio González (yellow card) 44'; Eric Curbelo (yellow card) 84'; Benito Ramírez (yellow card) 87'; Rober (yellow card) 88'; Álvaro Lemos (yellow card) 88'	Report	Imanol García de Albéniz (yellow card) 45+1'	Stadium: Estadio Gran Canaria; Attendance: 11,299; Referee: (Spain) Alejandro Quintero González

15 May 2022 40	Alcorcón	0–2	Las Palmas	Alcorcón
14:00 WEST (UTC+1)	Apeh (yellow card) 34'	Report	Jonathan Viera 21'; Jesé (yellow card) 62'; Rober 90+1'	Stadium: Estadio Municipal de Santo Domingo; Attendance: 1,557; Referee: (Spain) Iosu Galech Apezteguía

21 May 2022 41	Las Palmas	2–1	Real Oviedo	Las Palmas
21:00 WEST (UTC+1)	Alberto Moleiro 26'; Jonathan Viera 62'	Report	Borja Sánchez 7'; Carlos Isaac (yellow card) 45+3'; Cornud (red card) 90'	Stadium: Estadio Gran Canaria; Attendance: 30,063; Referee: (Spain) Saúl Ais Reig

29 May 2022 42	Sporting Gijón	0–1	Las Palmas	Gijón
19:00 CEST (UTC+2)	Pablo García (yellow card) 36'; Javier Mecerreyes (yellow card) 90+1'	Report	Jonathan Viera 37' (pen.)	Stadium: El Molinón; Attendance: 12,346; Referee: (Spain) Eduardo Prieto Iglesias

==== Promotion play-offs ====
1 June 2022 First leg	Tenerife	1–0	Las Palmas	Santa Cruz de Tenerife
20:00 WEST (UTC+1)				Stadium: Heliodoro Rodríguez López

4 June 2022 Second leg	Las Palmas	1–2 (1–3 agg.)	Tenerife	Las Palmas
20:00 WEST (UTC+1)				Stadium: Estadio Gran Canaria

=== Copa del Rey ===
2 December 2021 First Round	Vélez	2 - 3	Las Palmas	Vélez-Málaga
16:00 CET	Joselinho 10'; Unai Veiga 33' (o.g.); Cervera (yellow card) 35'; Pedro Ramirez (yellow card) 63'; Álex Portillo (yellow card) 84'; Álex Camacho (yellow card) 89'	Report	Benito Ramírez 27'; Sadiku 43'; Álex Suárez (yellow card) 62'; Ale García 83'; Kirian Rodríguez (yellow card) 85' (yellow-red card) 90+2'; Maikel Mesa (yellow card) 88'	Stadium: Estadio Vivar Téllez; Referee: (Spain) Rafael Sánchez López

15 December 2021 Second Round	Real Valladolid	3 - 1	Las Palmas	Valladolid
20:00 CET	Tuhami 45+2'; Sergio León (yellow card) 53'; Weissman 63'; Cristo González 68'; Olaza (yellow card) 74'	Report	Sadiku 22'; Álex Suárez (yellow card) 56'; Unai Veiga (red card) 61'; Fabio González (yellow card) 78'	Stadium: Estadio José Zorrilla; Attendance: 8,266; Referee: (Spain) Francisco Hernández Maeso

== Statistics ==
=== Goalscorers ===
As of 29 May 2022

Rank	Pos.	No.	Player	Segunda División	Promotion play-offs	Copa del Rey	Total
1	MF	21	(Spain) Jonathan Viera	14	0	0	14
2	FW	10	(Spain) Jesé	11	0	0	11
3	FW	19	(Albania) Armando Sadiku	4	0	2	6
4	FW	24	(Spain) Pejiño	5	0	0	5
4	MF	20	(Spain) Kirian Rodríguez	5	0	0	5
Total				57	0	4	61
