= 2022–23 UD Las Palmas season =

UD Las Palmas
2022–23 season
- President: Miguel Ángel Ramírez Alonso
- Head coach: García Pimienta
- Stadium: Estadio Gran Canaria
- Segunda División: 2nd (promoted)
- Copa del Rey: Second round
- Top goalscorer: League: Marc Cardona; Sandro Ramírez; Jonathan Viera (7 each); All: Marc Cardona; Sandro Ramírez; Jonathan Viera (7 each)
Home colours	Away colours

The 2022–23 season was the 74th season in the history of UD Las Palmas and their fifth consecutive season in the second division. The club participated in Segunda División and the Copa del Rey.

== Players ==
As of 21 September 2022.

Note: Flags indicate national team as defined under FIFA eligibility rules; some limited exceptions apply. Players may hold more than one non-FIFA nationality.

No.	Pos.	Nation	Player
1	GK	ESP	Álex Domínguez
2	MF	ESP	Marvin Park (on loan from Real Madrid)
3	DF	ESP	Sergi Cardona
4	DF	ESP	Álex Suárez
5	DF	ESP	Enrique Clemente
6	DF	ESP	Eric Curbelo
7	FW	ESP	Vitolo (on loan from Atlético Madrid)
8	MF	ESP	Fabio González
9	FW	ESP	Sandro Ramírez (on loan from Huesca)
10	MF	ESP	Alberto Moleiro
11	FW	ESP	Benito Ramírez
12	MF	FRA	Enzo Loiodice
13	GK	ESP	Álvaro Valles
14	DF	ESP	Álvaro Lemos
15	MF	ESP	Álvaro Jiménez (on loan from Cádiz)

No.	Pos.	Nation	Player
16	FW	ROU	Florin Andone
17	MF	ESP	Óscar Clemente
18	DF	BRA	Sidnei
19	FW	ESP	Marc Cardona
20	FW	ESP	Joel del Pino
21	MF	ESP	Jonathan Viera (captain)
22	MF	COD	Omenuke Mfulu (vice-captain)
23	DF	GEQ	Saúl Coco
24	FW	ESP	Pejiño
26	DF	ESP	Alejandro Palanca
27	FW	ESP	Ale García
28	MF	ESP	Julen Pérez
30	GK	ESP	Javier Cendón
—	MF	ESP	Kirian Rodríguez

=== Reserve team ===
Note: Flags indicate national team as defined under FIFA eligibility rules; some limited exceptions apply. Players may hold more than one non-FIFA nationality.

No.	Pos.	Nation	Player
31	MF	ESP	Joaquín González
32	FW	SEN	Saliou Mandiang

No.	Pos.	Nation	Player
33	DF	ESP	Álvaro Santana

=== Out on loan ===
Note: Flags indicate national team as defined under FIFA eligibility rules; some limited exceptions apply. Players may hold more than one non-FIFA nationality.

No.	Pos.	Nation	Player
—	DF	ESP	Unai Veiga (at Algeciras until 30 June 2023)
—	DF	ESP	Isaac Hernández (at Guadalajara until 30 June 2023)

No.	Pos.	Nation	Player
—	FW	GBS	Claudio Mendes (at Logroñés until 30 June 2023)
—	FW	ESP	Óscar Pinchi (at Mirandés until 30 June 2023)

== Transfers ==
=== In ===
Date	Player	From	Type	Fee	Ref
7 July 2022	(Spain) Marc Cardona	Osasuna	Transfer	Free	
7 July 2022	(Brazil) Sidnei	(Brazil) Goiás	Transfer	Undisclosed	
20 July 2022	(Spain) Álvaro Jiménez	Cádiz	Loan		
21 July 2022	(Spain) Vitolo	Atlético Madrid	Loan		
12 August 2022	(Spain) Marvin Park	Real Madrid	Loan		
22 August 2022	(Spain) Sandro Ramírez	Huesca	Loan		
27 August 2022	(Spain) Enrique Clemente	Zaragoza	Transfer	Undisclosed	
1 September 2022	(Romania) Florin Andone	(England) Brighton & Hove Albion	Transfer	Undisclosed	

=== Out ===
Date	Player	To	Type	Fee	Ref
1 July 2022	(Spain) Rafa Mújica	(Portugal) Arouca	Transfer	Undisclosed	
17 July 2022	(Albania) Armando Sadiku	Cartagena	Transfer	Free	
18 July 2022	(Spain) Raúl Fernández	Granada	Transfer	Free	
25 July 2022	(Spain) Maikel Mesa	Albacete	Transfer	Free	
4 August 2022	(Spain) Jesé	(Turkey) MKE Ankaragücü	Transfer	Free	
9 August 2022	(Portugal) Hernâni	(Portugal) Rio Ave	Transfer	Free	
23 August 2022	(Ecuador) Erick Ferigra	(Portugal) Paços de Ferreira	Transfer	Free	

== Pre-season and friendlies ==
Win Draw Loss Fixtures

22 July 2022 Friendly	Espanyol	0–0	Las Palmas
CEST (UTC+2)

23 July 2022 Friendly	Lille	2–2	Las Palmas
CEST (UTC+2)

26 July 2022 Friendly	Cádiz	1–1	Las Palmas
CEST (UTC+2)

27 July 2022 Friendly	Al-Shabab	2–1	Las Palmas
CEST (UTC+2)

29 July 2022 Friendly	Al-Nassr	2–2	Las Palmas
CEST (UTC+2)

6 August 2022 Friendly	Las Palmas	3–0	Tamaraceite
CEST (UTC+2)

7 February 2023 Friendly	Las Palmas	1–3	Djurgårdens
CEST (UTC+2)

== Competitions ==
=== Overall record ===
Competition	First match	Last match	Starting round	Final position	Record							
Competition	First match	Last match	Starting round	Final position	Pld	W	D	L	GF	GA	GD	Win %
Segunda División	12 August 2022	27 May 2023	Matchday 1	2nd	42	18	18	6	49	29	+20	42.86
Copa del Rey	13 November 2022	22 December 2022	First round	Second round	2	1	1	0	1	0	+1	50.00
Total					44	19	19	6	50	29	+21	43.18

Source: Soccerway

=== Segunda División ===
==== League table ====
Pos	Team	Pld	W	D	L	GF	GA	GD	Pts	Qualification or relegation
1	Granada (C, P)	42	22	9	11	55	30	+25	75	Promotion to La Liga
2	Las Palmas (P)	42	18	18	6	49	29	+20	72 (Note: Overall goal difference: Las Palmas +20, Levante +16.)	Promotion to La Liga
3	Levante	42	18	18	6	46	30	+16	72	Qualification for promotion play-offs
4	Alavés (O, P)	42	19	14	9	47	33	+14	71 (Note: Alavés finished ahead of Eibar on head-to-head points: Eibar 0–0 Alavés, Alavés 2–0 Eibar.)	Qualification for promotion play-offs
5	Eibar	42	19	14	9	45	36	+9	71	Qualification for promotion play-offs

Source: LaLiga SmartBank
Rules for classification: 1) points; 2) head-to-head points; 3) head-to-head goal difference; 4) goal difference; 5) number of goals scored
(C) Champions; (O) Play-off winners; (P) Promoted
Notes:

Notes

1. Reserve teams are not eligible for promotion to the same league as the first team.

==== Results summary ====
Overall								Home						Away					
Pld	W	D	L	GF	GA	GD	Pts	W	D	L	GF	GA	GD	W	D	L	GF	GA	GD
42	18	18	6	49	29	+20	72	9	9	3	24	13	+11	9	9	3	25	16	+9

Source: LaLiga SmartBank

==== Results by round ====
Round	1	2	3	4	5	6	7	8	9	10	11	12	13	14	15	16	17	18	19	20	21	22	23	24	25	26	27	28	29	30	31	32	33	34	35	36	37	38	39	40	41	42
Ground	H	A	H	A	H	A	H	A	H	A	A	H	A	H	H	A	H	A	A	H	A	H	A	H	H	A	H	A	H	A	H	A	H	A	H	A	H	A	A	H	A	H
Result	D	W	W	D	W	D	W	D	D	W	W	W	L	L	D	D	W	W	D	L	W	D	W	W	W	D	W	D	W	D	D	L	D	W	L	L	D	D	W	D	W	D
Position	12	4	2	3	1	2	1	2	2	1	1	1	1	3	2	3	2	1	1	2	1	2	2	2	1	1	1	1	1	1	2	3	3	2	2	3	4	5	1	2	2	2

Source: LaLiga SmartBank
A = Away; H = Home; W = Win; D = Draw; L = Loss

==== Matches ====
The league fixtures were announced on 23 June 2022.

13 August 2022 1	Las Palmas	v	Las Palmas
CEST (UTC+2)			Stadium: Estadio Gran Canaria

=== Copa del Rey ===
13 November 2022 First round	Teruel	0–1	Las Palmas	Teruel
16:30		Report	Pejiño 55'	Stadium: Pinilla; Referee: Andrés Fuentes Molina
