= 2020–21 UD Las Palmas season =

UD Las Palmas
2020–21 season
- President: Miguel Ángel Ramírez
- Head coach: Pepe Mel
- Stadium: Estadio Gran Canaria
- Segunda División: 9th
- Copa del Rey: Second round
- Top goalscorer: League: Sergio Araujo (11); All: Sergio Araujo (11)
Home colours	Away colours	Third colours
- All statistics correct as of 30 May 2021.

The 2020–21 season was the 72nd season in existence of Unión Deportiva Las Palmas and the club's third consecutive season in the second division of Spanish football. In addition to the domestic league, Las Palmas participated in this season's edition of the Copa del Rey. The season covered the period from 26 July 2020 to 30 June 2021.

== Players ==
=== First-team squad ===
As of 1 February 2021.

Note: Flags indicate national team as defined under FIFA eligibility rules; some limited exceptions apply. Players may hold more than one non-FIFA nationality.

No.	Pos.	Nation	Player
1	GK	ESP	Álvaro Valles
2	DF	ESP	Álex Díez
3	MF	ESP	Sergio Ruiz (on loan from Charlotte FC)
4	DF	ESP	Álex Suárez
5	DF	ARG	Tomás Cardona (on loan from Godoy Cruz)
6	DF	ESP	Eric Curbelo
7	FW	ESP	Aridai
8	MF	ESP	Maikel Mesa
9	FW	ESP	Jesé
10	FW	ARG	Sergio Araujo
11	FW	ESP	Benito Ramírez
12	MF	FRA	Enzo Loiodice
13	DF	KEN	Ismael Athuman
14	DF	ESP	Álvaro Lemos
15	MF	ESP	Fabio González
16	FW	ESP	Pejiño
17	MF	URU	Lautaro Sánchez

No.	Pos.	Nation	Player
18	MF	ESP	Javi Castellano (vice-captain)
19	FW	ESP	Edu Espiau
20	MF	ESP	Kirian Rodríguez
21	MF	ESP	Christian Rivera
22	FW	ESP	Rafa Mújica (on loan from Leeds United)
23	DF	ESP	Dani Castellano
24	FW	ESP	Rober (on loan from Betis)
25	DF	ESP	Aythami Artiles (captain)
26	FW	GBS	Claudio Mendes
27	MF	ESP	Pol Salvador
28	MF	ESP	Alberto Moleiro
29	FW	ESP	Pau Miguélez
30	GK	ESP	Álex Domínguez
32	GK	ESP	Sergi Puig
33	DF	BRA	Jonathan (on loan from Almería)
35	DF	GEQ	Saúl Coco
36	MF	ESP	Diego Gutiérrez

=== Other players under contract ===
Note: Flags indicate national team as defined under FIFA eligibility rules; some limited exceptions apply. Players may hold more than one non-FIFA nationality.

No.	Pos.	Nation	Player
—	GK	ESP	Raúl Fernández
—	MF	ESP	Cristian Cedrés

=== Reserve team ===
Note: Flags indicate national team as defined under FIFA eligibility rules; some limited exceptions apply. Players may hold more than one non-FIFA nationality.

No.	Pos.	Nation	Player
31	MF	ESP	Sato
37	MF	ESP	Pipo Santana

=== Out on loan ===
Note: Flags indicate national team as defined under FIFA eligibility rules; some limited exceptions apply. Players may hold more than one non-FIFA nationality.

No.	Pos.	Nation	Player
—	DF	ESP	Alberto de la Bella (at Cartagena until 30 June 2021)
—	FW	ESP	Adrián Flaqué (at Andratx until 30 June 2021)

== Transfers ==
=== In ===
No.	Pos	Player	Transferred from	Fee	Date	Source
15			TBD		1 July 2020	

=== Out ===
No.	Pos	Player	Transferred to	Fee	Date	Source
15			TBD		1 July 2020	

== Pre-season and friendlies ==
Win Draw Loss Fixtures

4 September 2020 Friendly	Tenerife	1–3	Las Palmas	Santa Cruz de Tenerife, Spain
19:00 CEST (UTC+2)	Pomares 78'		Rober 46'; Rodríguez 59'; Maikel 90+3' (pen.)	Stadium: Heliodoro Rodríguez López; Attendance: 0 Referee: Alexander González González

== Competitions ==
=== Overview ===
Competition	First match	Last match	Starting round	Final position	Record							
Competition	First match	Last match	Starting round	Final position	Pld	W	D	L	GF	GA	GD	Win %
Segunda División	12 September 2020	30 May 2021	Matchday 1	9th	42	14	14	14	46	52	−6	33.33
Copa del Rey	17 December 2020	6 January 2021	First round	Second round	2	1	0	1	4	1	+3	50.00
Total					44	15	14	15	50	53	−3	34.09

Last updated: 30 May 2021
Source: Soccerway

=== Segunda División ===
==== League table ====
Pos	Team	Pld	W	D	L	GF	GA	GD	Pts
7	Sporting Gijón	42	17	14	11	37	28	+9	65
8	Ponferradina	42	15	12	15	45	50	−5	57
9	Las Palmas	42	14	14	14	46	53	−7	56
10	Mirandés	42	14	12	16	38	41	−3	54 (Note: Head-to-head points: Mirandés: 6, Fuenlabrada: 0)
11	Fuenlabrada	42	12	18	12	45	46	−1	54

Source: LaLiga
Rules for classification: 1) points; 2) head-to-head points; 3) head-to-head goal difference; 4) goal difference; 5) number of goals scored

==== Results summary ====
Overall								Home						Away					
Pld	W	D	L	GF	GA	GD	Pts	W	D	L	GF	GA	GD	W	D	L	GF	GA	GD
42	14	14	14	46	52	−6	56	11	5	5	34	23	+11	3	9	9	12	29	−17

Last updated: 30 May 2021.
Source: La Liga

==== Results by round ====
Round	1	2	3	4	5	6	7	8	9	10	11	12	13	14	15	16	17	18	19	20	21	22	23	24	25	26	27	28	29	30	31	32	33	34	35	36	37	38	39	40	41	42
Ground	A	H	A	H	A	H	H	A	A	H	A	H	A	H	H	A	A	H	A	H	A	H	A	H	A	H	A	H	A	H	A	H	H	A	H	A	H	A	H	A	H	A
Result	L	D	D	W	D	W	W	L	D	L	D	W	L	L	W	W	D	D	L	W	W	W	L	L	L	W	L	D	W	L	D	W	D	D	D	L	W	D	L	L	W	W
Position	17	11	11	11	11	11	11	11	11	11	11	11	15	15	15	15	15	15	15	15	9	9	10	11	13	10	13	14	12	12	12	12	12	12	12	12	12	10	13	14	10	9

Updated to match(es) played on 30 May 2021. Source: La Liga
A = Away; H = Home; W = Win; D = Draw; L = Loss

==== Matches ====
The league fixtures were announced on 31 August 2020.

12 September 2020 1	Leganés	1–0	Las Palmas	Leganés
18:15 CEST (UTC+2)	Muñoz 75'	Report		Stadium: Estadio Municipal de Butarque; Attendance: 0 (Note: The match was played behind closed doors due to the COVID-19 pandemic in Spain.); Referee: José Antonio López Toca

20 September 2020 2	Las Palmas	3–3	Fuenlabrada	Las Palmas
20:30 CEST (UTC+2)	Espiau (yellow card) 8'; Curbelo (yellow card) 36'; Lemos 45'; Pejiño 48', (yellow card) 49'; Loiodice (yellow card) 63'; Claudio (yellow card) 81', (goal) 90'; Araujo (yellow card) 90+3'	Report	Antonio Cristian (yellow card) 27'; Nteka 64'; Salvador (yellow card) 71', (goal) 79' (pen.); Pinchi (yellow card) 83'; Kanté 84'	Stadium: Estadio Gran Canaria; Attendance: 0 Referee: Rubén Ávalos Barrera

26 September 2020 3	Zaragoza	2–2	Las Palmas	Zaragoza
16:00 CEST (UTC+2)	Nieto (yellow card) 10' (yellow-red card) 85'; Ros (yellow card) 16', (goal) 49'; Claudio 19' (o.g.); Atienza (yellow card) 37'; Buyla (yellow card) 63'; Adrián (yellow card) 90+4'	Report	Lemos 23', (yellow card) 57' (yellow-red card) 70'; Espiau 82'; Mesa (yellow card) 89'	Stadium: La Romareda; Attendance: 0 Referee: Javier Iglesias Villanueva

3 October 2020 4	Las Palmas	2–1	UD Logroñés	Las Palmas
20:30 CEST (UTC+2)	Ruiz (yellow card) 24'; Rober 53'; González (yellow card) 68'; Artiles (yellow card) 70'; Araujo 90'; Curbelo (yellow card) 90+2'	Report	Errasti (yellow card) 31'; Andy 90+3' (pen.)	Stadium: Estadio Gran Canaria; Attendance: 0 Referee: Jon González Esteban

11 October 2020 5	Málaga	0–0	Las Palmas	Málaga
16:00 CEST (UTC+2)	Rahmani (yellow card) 38'; Escassi (yellow card) 60'; Juande (yellow card) 83'	Report	Suárez (red card) 40'; Ruiz (yellow card) 52'; Valles (yellow card) 90+4'	Stadium: La Rosaleda; Attendance: 0 Referee: Saúl Ais Reig

17 October 2020 6	Las Palmas	2–0	Almería	Las Palmas
18:15 CEST (UTC+2)	Araujo 7', 76'; Lemos (yellow card) 14'; Pejiño (yellow card) 28'; Iemmello (yellow card) 90+3'	Report	Carvalho (yellow card) 55'; Aketxe (yellow card) 62'; Balliu (yellow card) 65'	Stadium: Estadio Gran Canaria; Attendance: 0 Referee: Iñaki Vicandi Garrido

21 October 2020 7	Las Palmas	2–1	Castellón	Las Palmas
19:00 CEST (UTC+2)	Araujo 49'; Claudio (yellow card) 60'; Rober 72'; González (yellow card) 90'	Report	Señé (yellow card) 44'; Gálvez 65'	Stadium: Estadio Gran Canaria; Attendance: 0 Referee: Oliver De La Fuente

24 October 2020 8	Cartagena	3–0	Las Palmas	Cartagena
18:15 CEST (UTC+2)	Castro 25' (pen.); Andújar (yellow card) 31'; Martín 41'; Gil (yellow card) 45+4'; De la Bella (yellow card) 52'; Aguza (yellow card) 70'; Carrasquilla 88'	Report	Lemos (yellow card) 45+3' (yellow-red card) 90'; Loiodice (yellow card) 60'; Suárez (yellow card) 89'	Stadium: Cartagonova; Attendance: 0 Referee: Rubén Ávalos Barrera

28 October 2020 9	Albacete	1–1	Las Palmas	Albacete
19:00 CET (UTC+1)	Garcia 37'; Chema (yellow card) 90+2'; Israfilov (yellow card) 90+7'	Report	Castellano (yellow card) 45+3'; González (yellow card) 53'; Curbelo (yellow card) 71'; Mesa (yellow card) 83', (goal) 90' (pen.); Jonathan (yellow card) 90+3'	Stadium: Estadio Carlos Belmonte; Attendance: 0 Referee: David Gálvez Rascón

31 October 2020 10	Las Palmas	1–2	Oviedo	Las Palmas
18:15 CET (UTC+1)	Lemos (yellow card) 62'; Suárez 88'	Report	Fernández (yellow card) 15'; Nahuel 19', 21'; González (yellow card) 48'; Hernández (yellow card) 52'; Mier (yellow card) 89'	Stadium: Estadio Gran Canaria; Attendance: 0 Referee: Miguel Ángel Ortiz Arias

9 November 2020 11	Girona	1–1	Las Palmas	Girona
21:00 CET (UTC+1)	Espinosa 67', (yellow card) 85' (yellow-red card) 90+4'; Luna (yellow card) 73'; Moreno (yellow card) 90+1'	Report	Ruiz 45'; Lemos (yellow card) 66'	Stadium: Estadi Municipal de Montilivi; Attendance: 0 Referee: Luis Mario Milla Alvéndiz

15 November 2020 12	Las Palmas	1–0	Tenerife	Las Palmas
22:00 CET (UTC+1)	Jonathan (yellow card) 38'; Ortolá 48' (o.g.); Rober (yellow card) 72'; Lemos (yellow card) 90+4'	Report	González (yellow card) 90+2'	Stadium: Estadio Gran Canaria; Attendance: 0 Referee: Dámaso Arcediano Monescillo

22 November 2020 13	Sabadell	3–1	Las Palmas	Sabadell
14:00 CET (UTC+1)	Cuevas 33', 69', (yellow card) 60'; Guruzeta 45'	Report	Jonathan (red card) 57'; Ruiz 63'; Cabrera (yellow card) 90+2'	Stadium: Estadi de la Nova Creu Alta; Attendance: 0 Referee: Álvaro Moreno Aragón

25 November 2020 14	Las Palmas	0–2	Mirandés	Las Palmas
19:00 CET (UTC+1)	Claudio (yellow card) 90+1'	Report	Artiles 18' (o.g.); Berrocal (yellow card) 47'; Meseguer (yellow card) 62'; Jirka 79'	Stadium: Estadio Gran Canaria; Attendance: 0 Referee: Saúl Ais Reig

29 November 2020 15	Las Palmas	3–2	Sporting Gijón	Las Palmas
21:00 CET (UTC+1)	Rober 54', 56'; Curbelo (yellow card) 72'; Espiau 84'	Report	Fuego (yellow card) 16'; Đurđević 24' (pen.), 35', (yellow card) 67'; López (yellow card) 38'	Stadium: Estadio Gran Canaria; Attendance: 0 Referee: Javier Iglesias Villanueva

2 December 2020 16	Lugo	1–1	Las Palmas	Lugo
21:30 CET (UTC+1)	Barreiro 12' (pen.), (red card) 79'; Iriome (yellow card) 66'	Report	Loiodice 19'; Curbelo (yellow card) 33'	Stadium: Estadio Anxo Carro; Attendance: 0 Referee: Jon Ander González Esteban

5 December 2020 17	Ponferradina	0–0	Las Palmas	Ponferrada
16:00 CET (UTC+1)	Reina (yellow card) 43'; Adot (yellow card) 79'	Report	Athuman (yellow card) 56'; Lemos (yellow card) 81'; Castellano (yellow card) 86'	Stadium: El Toralín; Attendance: 0 Referee: Miguel Ángel Ortiz Arias

13 December 2020 18	Las Palmas	0–0	Alcorcón	Las Palmas
18:15 CET (UTC+1)	Rodríguez (yellow card) 24'; Cedrés (yellow card) 28'; Castellano (yellow card) 75'	Report	José Carlos (yellow card) 42'	Stadium: Estadio Gran Canaria; Attendance: 0 Referee: Rubén Ávalos Barrera

20 December 2020 19	Rayo Vallecano	2–0	Las Palmas	Madrid
18:15 CET (UTC+1)	Trejo (yellow card) 40'; Antoñín 58'; Bebé (yellow card) 85', (goal) 87'	Report	Mesa (yellow card) 28'; Ramírez (yellow card) 35'; Espiau (yellow card) 50'; Rodríguez (yellow card) 82'	Stadium: Campo de Fútbol de Vallecas; Attendance: 0 Referee: Oliver De La Fuente

3 January 2021 20	Las Palmas	1–0	Espanyol	Las Palmas
16:00 CET (UTC+1)	Rober 26'; Lemos (yellow card) 35'; Ruiz (yellow card) 66'; Castellano (yellow card) 75'; Espiau (yellow card) 90+2'; Claudio (yellow card) 90+4'; Domínguez (yellow card) 90+5'	Report	L. López (red card) 49'; D. López (yellow card) 67'; Cabrera (yellow card) 80'	Stadium: Estadio Gran Canaria; Attendance: 0 Referee: Daniel Ocón Arráiz

10 January 2021 21	Mallorca	0–1	Las Palmas	Palma de Mallorca
16:00 CET (UTC+1)	Sastre (yellow card) 57'; Valjent (yellow card) 61'; Diabate (yellow card) 88'	Report	Araujo 21'; Castellano (yellow card) 75'	Stadium: Visit Mallorca Stadium; Attendance: 0 Referee: Aitor Gorostegui Fernández Ortega

24 January 2021 22	Las Palmas	2–1	Leganés	Las Palmas
20:30 CET (UTC+1)	Araujo (yellow card) 41'; Ruiz 63'; Cabrera 86' (pen.); Mesa (yellow card) 87'	Report	Hernández (red card) 45+2'; Shibasaki (yellow card) 49'; Merino (yellow card) 51'; Pardo 70', (yellow card) 71'; Bustinza (yellow card) 84' (yellow-red card) 89'; Ibáñez (yellow card) 90+1'	Stadium: Estadio Gran Canaria; Attendance: 0 Referee: Iosu Galech Apezteguía

31 January 2021 23	Mirandés	2–0	Las Palmas	Miranda de Ebro
18:15 CET (UTC+1)	Vivian (yellow card) 25'; González 31', (yellow card) 32'; López (yellow card) 34'; Jirka (yellow card) 84', (goal) 90+2'; Lizoain (yellow card) 88'	Report	Castellano (yellow card) 68'; Díez (yellow card) 88'	Stadium: Estadio Municipal de Anduva; Attendance: 0 Referee: David Gálvez Rascón

7 February 2021 24	Las Palmas	0–1	Sabadell	Las Palmas
20:30 CET (UTC+1)	Domínguez (red card) 33'	Report	Hernández 62'	Stadium: Estadio Gran Canaria; Attendance: 0 Referee: Javier Iglesias Villanueva

14 February 2021 25	Almería	3–1	Las Palmas	Almería
16:00 CET (UTC+1)	Fernandes (yellow card) 20'; Costa (yellow card) 26'; Villar (yellow card) 28', (goal) 45+2' (pen.), 48'; Robertone (yellow card) 43'; Akieme 54'	Report	Mújica 53'; Castellano (yellow card) 72'	Stadium: Estadio de los Juegos Mediterráneos; Attendance: 0 Referee: Jon Ander González Esteban

20 February 2021 26	Las Palmas	2–0	Cartagena	Las Palmas
20:30 CET (UTC+1)	Mújica (yellow card) 7'; Mesa 14' (pen.), (yellow card) 38'; Pejiño 19'; Araujo (yellow card) 34'; Díez (yellow card) 52'	Report	Navas (yellow card) 65'; Aburjania (yellow card) 74'	Stadium: Estadio Gran Canaria; Attendance: 0 Referee: Francisco José Hernández Maeso

27 February 2021 27	Castellón	4–0	Las Palmas	Castellón de la Plana
20:30 CET (UTC+1)	Moyano (yellow card) 15'; Mateu 19' (pen.); Díaz (yellow card) 32'; Fernández 58'; Jamelli 70', 81'	Report	Araujo (yellow card) 24' (yellow-red card) 27'; Curbelo (yellow card) 42'; Castellano (yellow card) 45+1'; Mújica (yellow card) 45+3'; Pejiño (yellow card) 56'; Suárez (yellow card) 87'	Stadium: Nou Estadi Castàlia; Attendance: 0 Referee: Rafael Sánchez López

6 March 2021 28	Las Palmas	1–1	Rayo Vallecano	Las Palmas
18:15 CET (UTC+1)	Díez (yellow card) 5'; Ruiz 87'	Report	Trejo 42' (pen.), (yellow card) 86'	Stadium: Estadio Gran Canaria; Attendance: 0 Referee: Eduardo Prieto Iglesias

13 March 2021 29	Fuenlabrada	1–2	Las Palmas	Fuenlabrada
16:00 CET (UTC+1)	Garcés 2'; Ciss (yellow card) 32' (yellow-red card) 66'; Fuentes (yellow card) 86'	Report	Rivera (yellow card) 9'; Pejiño 35', 71'; Curbelo (yellow card) 79'	Stadium: Fernando Torres; Attendance: 0 Referee: Iñaki Bikandi Garrido

19 March 2021 30	Las Palmas	1–2	Girona	Las Palmas
21:00 CET (UTC+1)	Lemos 42' (pen.); Araujo (yellow card) 45+1'; Curbelo (yellow card) 69'	Report	Bustos (yellow card) 37'; Sylla 47'; Espinosa (yellow card) 56'; Couto 64'; Juanpe (yellow card) 70'; Terrats (yellow card) 72'; Bueno (red card) 90+1'	Stadium: Estadio Gran Canaria; Attendance: 0 Referee: Álvaro Moreno Aragón

28 March 2021 31	Tenerife	1–1	Las Palmas	Santa Cruz de Tenerife
21:30 CEST (UTC+2)	Vada 10', (yellow card) 19'; Santana (yellow card) 84'; Šipčić (yellow card) 89'; Ruiz (yellow card) 90+6'	Report	Ruiz 41'; Pejiño (yellow card) 43'	Stadium: Heliodoro Rodríguez López; Attendance: 0 Referee: Luis Mario Milla Alvéndiz

1 April 2021 32	Las Palmas	6–1	Lugo	Las Palmas
21:00 CEST (UTC+2)	Lemos (yellow card) 4'; Jesé 13' (pen.); Rober 35', 57', 88'; Araujo 45+2'; Mesa (yellow card) 68'; Cabrera 90'	Report	Juanpe 5'; Ruiz (yellow card) 10'; Torres (yellow card) 12'; Pita (yellow card) 60'	Stadium: Estadio Gran Canaria; Attendance: 0 Referee: Gorka Sagues Oscoz

4 April 2021 33	Las Palmas	1–1	Mallorca	Las Palmas
20:30 CEST (UTC+2)	Araujo 47'	Report	Amath 14'; Murilo (yellow card) 31'; Sedlar (yellow card) 45'; Cufré (yellow card) 76'	Stadium: Estadio Gran Canaria; Attendance: 0 Referee: Jon Ander González Esteban

10 April 2021 34	Oviedo	0–0	Las Palmas	Oviedo
16:00 CEST (UTC+2)	Tejera (yellow card) 12'; Fernández (yellow card) 71'; Arribas (yellow card) 75'	Report	Clemente (yellow card) 23'; Lemos (yellow card) 66'; Jesé (red card) 66'; Mesa (yellow card) 70'	Stadium: Carlos Tartiere; Attendance: 0 Referee: Francisco José Hernández Maeso

17 April 2021 35	Las Palmas	1–1	Málaga	Las Palmas
18:15 CEST (UTC+2)	Clemente (yellow card) 11'; Suárez (yellow card) 49'; Lemos (yellow card) 60'; Araujo 85'	Report	Benítez (yellow card) 16'; Juande (yellow card) 18'; Šćepović 78'	Stadium: Estadio Gran Canaria; Attendance: 0 Referee: Aitor Gorostegui Fernández Ortega

24 April 2021 36	Espanyol	4–0	Las Palmas	Cornellà de Llobregat
18:15 CEST (UTC+2)	Puado 9', 14', 23'; Calero (yellow card) 20'; Embarba 49' (pen.); Dimata (yellow card) 52'	Report	Lemos (yellow card) 32' (yellow-red card) 39'; Curbelo (yellow card) 49'	Stadium: RCDE Stadium; Attendance: 0 Referee: Álvaro Moreno Aragón

2 May 2021 37	Las Palmas	2–0	Ponferradina	Las Palmas
20:30 CEST (UTC+2)	Mesa 18' (pen.); Araujo 70'; Cardona (yellow card) 80'	Report		Stadium: Estadio Gran Canaria; Attendance: 0 Referee: Iñaki Vicandi Garrido

8 May 2021 38	Alcorcón	0–0	Las Palmas	Alcorcón
18:30 CEST (UTC+2)		Report		Stadium: Santo Domingo; Attendance: 0 Referee: Javier Iglesias Villanueva

15 May 2021 39	Las Palmas	0–2	Zaragoza	Las Palmas
21:00 CEST (UTC+2)	Lemos (yellow card) 63'	Report	Zanimacchia 8' (pen.); Eguaras (yellow card) 22', (penalty missed) 25'; Vigaray (yellow card) 45'; Sanabria 81'; Jair (yellow card) 90+3'	Stadium: Estadio Gran Canaria; Attendance: 0 Referee: David Gálvez Rascón

20 May 2021 40	Sporting Gijón	1–0	Las Palmas	Gijón
19:00 CEST (UTC+2)	Đurđević 64'; Rosas (yellow card) 68'	Report	Cardona (yellow card) 26'	Stadium: El Molinón; Attendance: 0 Referee: Francisco José Hernández Maeso

24 May 2021 41	Las Palmas	3–2	Albacete	Las Palmas
21:00 CEST (UTC+2)	Araujo 9', 74', (yellow card) 75'; Jesé 41'; Curbelo (yellow card) 59'; Ramírez (yellow card) 81'; Espiau (yellow card) 90'	Report	Tana 66'; Zozulya (yellow card) 79'; Sepp Mvondo 89'; Barragán (yellow card) 90'	Stadium: Estadio Gran Canaria; Attendance: 0 Referee: Luis Mario Milla Alvéndiz

30 May 2021 42	UD Logroñés	0–1	Las Palmas	Logroño
21:00 CEST (UTC+2)		Report	Aridai 74'	Stadium: Las Gaunas; Attendance: 0 Referee: Dámaso Arcediano Monescillo

=== Copa del Rey ===
17 December 2020 First round	Varea	0–4	Las Palmas	Varea
20:00 CET (UTC+1)		Report	Cedrés 7'; Lemos 34'; Iemmello 35'; Curbelo 66'	Stadium: Municipal; Referee: Aitor Gorostegui Fernández-Ortega

6 January 2021 Second round	Navalcarnero	1–0	Las Palmas	Navalcarnero
17:00 CET (UTC+1)	Guerreiro 90'	Report	González (yellow card) 41' (yellow-red card) 59'	Stadium: Mariano González; Referee: Javier Iglesias Villanueva
