= 2019–20 UD Las Palmas season =

UD Las Palmas
2019–20 season
- Chairman: Miguel Ángel Ramírez
- Manager: Pepe Mel
- Stadium: Gran Canaria
- Segunda División: 9th
- Copa del Rey: Second Round
- Top goalscorer: League: Jonathan Viera (10 goals); All: Jonathan Viera (10 goals)
Home colours	Away colours

During the 2019–20 season, UD Las Palmas participated in the 2019–20 Segunda División and the Copa del Rey. The season covered the period from 1 July 2019 to 20 July 2020.

== Players ==
=== First-team squad ===
As of 27 June 2019.

Note: Flags indicate national team as defined under FIFA eligibility rules; some limited exceptions apply. Players may hold more than one non-FIFA nationality.

No.	Pos.	Nation	Player
1	GK	ESP	Raúl Fernández
3	DF	ESP	Alberto de la Bella
5	DF	ESP	David García (captain)
6	DF	ESP	Eric Curbelo
7	FW	ESP	Rubén Castro
8	MF	ESP	Maikel Mesa
10	FW	ARG	Sergio Araujo
11	MF	ESP	Momo
12	MF	ESP	David Timor
13	GK	ESP	Nauzet Pérez
14	DF	ESP	Álvaro Lemos
15	DF	ESP	Deivid

No.	Pos.	Nation	Player
17	FW	CZE	Tomáš Pekhart
18	MF	ESP	Javi Castellano
19	MF	ESP	Iñigo Ruiz de Galarreta
23	DF	ESP	Dani Castellano
24	MF	SRB	Slavoljub Srnić
25	DF	ESP	Aythami Artiles
26	MF	ESP	Cristian Cedrés
27	MF	ESP	Fabio González
28	MF	ESP	Pedri
30	GK	ESP	Josep Martínez
31	DF	ESP	Kirian Rodríguez
—	FW	ESP	Edu Espiau

=== Reserve team ===
Note: Flags indicate national team as defined under FIFA eligibility rules; some limited exceptions apply. Players may hold more than one non-FIFA nationality.

No.	Pos.	Nation	Player
32	MF	ESP	Toni Segura
34	GK	ESP	Álvaro Vallés

No.	Pos.	Nation	Player
37	MF	ESP	Carlos González
38	DF	ESP	Jesús Fortes

=== Out on loan ===
Note: Flags indicate national team as defined under FIFA eligibility rules; some limited exceptions apply. Players may hold more than one non-FIFA nationality.

No.	Pos.	Nation	Player
—	MF	ESP	Tana (at Zhejiang Greentown until 31 December 2019)

== Transfers ==
=== In ===
Date	Player	From	Type	Fee	Ref
17 June 2019	(Spain) Josep Martínez	(Spain) UD Las Palmas Atlético	Called Up	N/A	
17 June 2019	(Spain) Kirian Rodríguez	(Spain) UD Las Palmas Atlético	Called Up	N/A	
17 June 2019	(Spain) Fabio González	(Spain) UD Las Palmas Atlético	Called Up	N/A	
17 June 2019	(Spain) Edu Espiau	(Spain) UD Las Palmas Atlético	Called Up	N/A	

=== Out ===
Date	Player	To	Type	Fee	Ref
11 June 2019	(Argentina) Gabriel Peñalba	TBD	Released	N/A	
14 June 2019	(Spain) Fidel	Elche CF	Released	N/A	
18 June 2019	(Spain) Juan Cala	Cádiz	Released	N/A	

== Pre-season and friendlies ==
Win Draw Loss

20 July 2019 Friendly	Gran Tarajal (Spain)	0–4	(Spain) Las Palmas	Gran Tarajal
13:00		Summary		Stadium: Estadio Municipal De Gran Tarajal

24 July 2019 Friendly	Las Palmas (Spain)	6–0	(Spain) Tamaraceite	Las Palmas
19:00		Summary		Stadium: Campo Ernesto Aparicio

27 July 2019 Friendly	Marítimo	1–0	(Spain) Las Palmas	Funchal
21:00		Summary		Stadium: Estádio do Marítimo

31 July 2019 Friendly	Cádiz (Spain)	0–0	(Spain) Las Palmas	La Línea de la Concepción
20:00		Summary		Stadium: Estadio Municipal de La Línea de la Concepción

2 August 2019 Friendly	Las Palmas (Spain)	1–1	(Spain) Almería	Marbella
20:00		Summary		Stadium: Estadio Municipal Antonio Lorenzo Cuevas

4 August 2019 Friendly	Granada (Spain)	2–0	(Spain) Las Palmas	Marbella
19:30		Summary		Stadium: Marbella Football Center - Sur 1

7 August 2019 Friendly	Real Betis (Spain)	1–0	(Spain) Las Palmas	Seville
21:30		Summary		Stadium: Estadio Benito Villamarín

10 August 2019 Friendly	Lanzarote (Spain)	0–4	(Spain) Las Palmas	Arrecife
19:00		Summary		Stadium: Ciudad Deportiva de Lanzarote

== Competitions ==
=== Overview ===
Competition	First match	Last match	Starting round	Final position	Record							
Competition	First match	Last match	Starting round	Final position	Pld	W	D	L	GF	GA	GD	Win %
Segunda División	18 August 2019	20 July 2020	Matchday 1	9th	42	14	15	13	49	46	+3	33.33
Copa del Rey	17 December 2019	11 January 2020	First round	Second round	2	1	0	1	3	2	+1	50.00
Total					44	15	15	14	52	48	+4	34.09

Last updated: 20 July 2020
Source: Competitions

=== Segunda División ===
==== League table ====
Pos	Team	Pld	W	D	L	GF	GA	GD	Pts
7	Rayo Vallecano	42	13	21	8	60	50	+10	60 (Note: Rayo Vallecano finished ahead of Fuenlabrada on head-to-head points: Fuenlabrada 2–2 Rayo Vallecano, Rayo Vallecano 1–0 Fuenlabrada.)
8	Fuenlabrada	42	15	15	12	47	40	+7	60
9	Las Palmas	42	14	15	13	49	46	+3	57
10	Alcorcón	42	13	18	11	52	50	+2	57
11	Mirandés	42	13	17	12	55	59	−4	56

Source: LaLiga Soccerway
Rules for classification: 1) points; 2) head-to-head points; 3) head-to-head goal difference; 4) goal difference; 5) number of goals scored

==== Results summary ====
Overall								Home						Away					
Pld	W	D	L	GF	GA	GD	Pts	W	D	L	GF	GA	GD	W	D	L	GF	GA	GD
42	14	15	13	49	46	+3	57	9	7	5	31	21	+10	5	8	8	18	25	−7

Last updated: 20 July 2020.
Source: La Liga SmartBank

==== Results by round ====
Round	1	2	3	4	5	6	7	8	9	10	11	12	13	14	15	16	17	18	19	20	21	22	23	24	25	26	27	28	29	30	31	32	33	34	35	36	37	38	39	40	41	42
Ground	H	A	H	A	H	H	A	H	A	A	H	A	H	A	H	A	H	A	H	A	H	A	H	A	H	A	H	A	A	H	A	H	A	H	A	H	A	H	A	H	A	H
Result	L	D	D	D	L	W	L	W	W	W	W	L	L	L	D	L	W	W	W	W	D	D	L	D	D	L	L	D	D	D	L	D	W	W	D	D	L	W	L	W	D	W
Position	16	19	17	17	19	17	19	14	11	8	5	8	10	13	13	15	13	11	8	7	7	6	8	8	9	10	12	13	15	14	16	14	13	13	14	14	14	12	13	12	13	9

Updated to match(es) played on 20 July 2020. Source: La Liga SmartBank
A = Away; H = Home; W = Win; D = Draw; L = Loss

==== Matches ====
The fixtures were revealed on 4 July 2019.

18 August 2019 1	Las Palmas	0–1	Huesca	Las Palmas
20:00 CEST	Ruiz de Galarreta (yellow card) 51'; Mantovani (yellow card) 85'; Josep Martínez (yellow card) 90+4'	Report	Kike (yellow card) 11'; Álex Gallar 76'; Miguelón (yellow card) 90'; Dani Escriche (yellow card) 90+4'	Stadium: Estadio Gran Canaria; Attendance: 10,427; Referee: Jorge Figueroa

24 August 2019 2	Málaga	1–1	Las Palmas	Málaga
21:00	Diego González (yellow card) 46'; Adrián 80' (pen.)	Report	Pedri (yellow card) 45'; Kirian Rodríguez (yellow card) 48'; Rubén Castro 49'; Eric Curbelo (yellow card) 51'; Timor (yellow card) 65'	Stadium: La Rosaleda Stadium; Attendance: 17,691; Referee: Gorka Sagues

31 August 2019 3	Las Palmas	2–2	Racing Santander	Las Palmas
21:00 CEST	Artiles (yellow card) 5' (yellow-red card) 76'; Mantovani (yellow card) 17'; Kirian Rodríguez (yellow card) 68'; Castro 82' (pen.), 89'; Ruiz de Galarreta (yellow card) 90+6'	Report	Yoda 19', (yellow card) 23'; Minero (yellow card) 38'; Olaortua (yellow card) 80'; Cejudo 90+6'	Stadium: Estadio Gran Canaria; Attendance: 12,839; Referee: Álvaro Moreno

7 September 2019 4	Tenerife	0–0	Las Palmas	Santa Cruz de Tenerife
21:00 CEST	Borja Lasso (yellow card) 45+1'; Luis Milla (yellow card) 68' (red card) 73'	Summary	Lemos (yellow card) 9'; Mantovani (yellow card) 32'; Pedri (yellow card) 33'; de la Bella (yellow card) 50'; Ruiz de Galarreta (yellow card) 67'	Stadium: Estadio Heliodoro Rodríguez López; Attendance: 17,975; Referee: (Spain) Isidro Díaz de Mera

14 September 2019 5	Las Palmas	0–3	Almería	Las Palmas
18:30 CEST	Mantovani (yellow card) 39'; Eric Curbelo (yellow card) 66'; Drolé (yellow card) 75'	Summary	Gassama (yellow card) 19'; Romera 22'; César de la Hoz (yellow card) 24'; José Corpas 57'; Chema (yellow card) 61'; Petrović (yellow card) 85'; Vada 87'	Stadium: Estadio Gran Canaria; Attendance: 10,044; Referee: (Spain) Aitor Gorostegui

19 September 2019 6	Las Palmas	1–0	Real Sporting	Las Palmas
22:00 CEST	de la Bella (yellow card) 57'; Pedri 62'; Drolé (yellow card) 66'; Lemos (yellow card) 76'; Ruiz de Galarreta (yellow card) 79'	Summary	Babin (yellow card) 9'; Nacho Méndez (yellow card) 12'; Carlos Carmona (yellow card) 64'; Manu García (yellow card) 68'; Marc Valiente (yellow card) 72'	Stadium: Estadio Gran Canaria; Attendance: 7,699; Referee: (Spain) Oliver De La Fuente

22 September 2019 7	Girona	1–0	Las Palmas	Girona
16:00 CEST	Stuani 64' (pen.); Gumbau (yellow card) 69'; Álex Gallar (yellow card) 90+4'	Summary	Mantovani (yellow card) 90+5'	Stadium: Estadi Montilivi; Attendance: 8,247; Referee: (Spain) Alejandro Muñiz

27 September 2019 8	Las Palmas	3–2	Albacete	Las Palmas
21:00 CEST	Narváez (yellow card) 26'; Jonathan Viera 31' 45+1'; Pekhart 68' (yellow card) 85'; Pedri (yellow card) 84'; Lemos (yellow card) 90+6'	Summary	Tomeu Nadal (yellow card) 44'; Álvaro Arroyo (yellow card) 47'; Capezzi (yellow card) 62'; Fran García (yellow card) 63'; Zozulya 86'; Acuña 90+4'	Stadium: Estadio Gran Canaria; Attendance: 9,396; Referee: (Spain) Gorka Sagues

2 October 2019 9	Ponferradina	0–2	Las Palmas	Ponferrada
21:00 CEST	Pablo Trigueros (yellow card) 3'; Pablo Valcarce (yellow card) 45+1'; Óscar Sielva (yellow card) 90+5'	Summary	Jonathan Viera 25' (yellow card) 60'; Mantovani (yellow card) 40'; Fabio González (yellow card) 41'; de la Bella (yellow card) 52'; Josep Martínez (yellow card) 65'; Pedri 66'; Pekhart (yellow card) 84'; Aythami Artiles (yellow card) 89'	Stadium: Estadio El Toralín; Attendance: 5,008; Referee: (Spain) Iosu Galech

5 October 2019 10	Lugo	0–2	Las Palmas	Lugo
16:00 CEST	José Carlos (yellow card) 37'; Rahmani (yellow card) 90+1'	Summary	Ruiz de Galarreta (yellow card) 15'; Mantovani (yellow card) 19'; Aythami Artiles (yellow card) 54'; Jonathan Viera (yellow card) 62'; Álvaro Lemos (yellow card) 76'; Pedri 83'; Pekhart 90+3'	Stadium: Estadio Anxo Carro; Attendance: 2,691; Referee: (Spain) Santiago Varón

13 October 2019 11	Las Palmas	3–0	Deportivo La Coruña	Las Palmas
21:00 CEST	Pekhart 14' 31'; Mantovani (yellow card) 24'; Kirian Rodríguez (yellow card) 46'; Fabio González (yellow card) 55'; Jonathan Viera 66' (pen.); Aythami Artiles (yellow card) 75'	Summary	Vicente Gómez (yellow card) 38'; Peru Nolaskoain (yellow card) 47'; Álex Bergantiños (yellow card) 70'	Stadium: Estadio Gran Canaria; Attendance: 14,701; Referee: (Spain) Luis Milla

18 October 2019 12	Cádiz	2–0	Las Palmas	Cádiz
21:00 CEST	Fali 27'; Álex Fernández 80' (pen.) (yellow card) 90+1'; José Mari (yellow card) 84'	Summary	Álvaro Lemos (yellow card) 55'; Jonathan Viera (yellow card) 73'; de la Bella (yellow card) 77'	Stadium: Estadio Ramón de Carranza; Attendance: 16,521; Referee: (Spain) Saúl Ais

27 October 2019 13	Las Palmas	1–3	Fuenlabrada	Las Palmas
18:00 CEST	Lemos (yellow card) 31'; Cristian Cedrés (yellow card) 32'; Srnić (yellow card) 51'; Pekhart (yellow card) 74'; Jonathan Viera 88'	Summary	Chico (yellow card) 7'; Oriol Riera (yellow card) 8'; Hugo Fraile 29' (pen.) 84' (pen.); Juanma (yellow card) 41'; Nteka 44'; Álex Vallejo (yellow card) 47' (yellow-red card) 78'; Ciss (yellow card) 87'	Stadium: Estadio Gran Canaria; Attendance: 13,050; Referee: (Spain) Víctor Areces

3 November 2019 14	Real Zaragoza	3–0	Las Palmas	Zaragoza
18:30 CET	Suárez 4' (yellow card) 45' (goal) 64'; Carlos Nieto 13'; Álvaro Ratón (yellow card) 78'	Summary	Lemos (yellow card) 22' (yellow-red card) 88'; Fabio González (yellow card) 55'; Aythami Artiles (yellow card) 63'; Kirian Rodríguez (yellow card) 78'	Stadium: La Romareda; Attendance: 22,708; Referee: (Spain) Isidro Díaz de Mera

9 November 2019 15	Las Palmas	1–1	Alcorcón	Las Palmas
20:00 CET	Pekhart 5' (pen.); Javi Castellano (yellow card) 36'; de la Bella (yellow card) 85'	Summary	Adrián Diéguez 45+2'; Laure (yellow card) 78'	Stadium: Estadio Gran Canaria; Attendance: 8,872; Referee: (Spain) Daniel Ocón

17 November 2019 16	Mirandés	2–1	Las Palmas	Miranda de Ebro
18:30 CET	Iñigo Vicente 44'; Marcos André 45+1'; Antonio Sánchez (yellow card) 82'; Malsa (yellow card) 84'	Summary	Narváez 10'; Pekhart (yellow card) 26'; Dani Martín (yellow card) 32'; Deivid (yellow card) 39'; Eric Curbelo (yellow card) 67'; Lemos (yellow card) 74'; Javi Castellano (yellow card) 89'	Stadium: Estadio Municipal de Anduva; Attendance: 2,790; Referee: (Spain) Miguel Ortiz

24 November 2019 17	Las Palmas	3–1	Real Oviedo	Las Palmas
18:00 CET (UTC+1)	Narváez 3'; Benito Ramírez (yellow card) 31'; Jonathan Viera 39' 77'; Ruiz de Galarreta (yellow card) 60'	Summary	Marco Sangalli (yellow card) 49'; Javi Fernández (yellow card) 73'; Alejandro Arribas (yellow card) 75'; Bárcenas 86'	Stadium: Estadio Gran Canaria; Attendance: 11,727; Referee: (Spain) Jon González

1 December 2019 18	Extremadura	0–1	Las Palmas	Almendralejo
20:00 CET (UTC+1)	José Pardo (yellow card) 16'; Borja Granero (yellow card) 30'; Zarfino (yellow card) 89'	Summary	Mantovani (yellow card) 20' (yellow-red card) 90+4'; de la Bella (yellow card) 38'; Jonathan Viera 43' (pen.); Eric Curbelo (yellow card) 51'; Javi Castellano (yellow card) 54'; Ruiz de Galarreta (yellow card) 73'; Aythami Artiles (yellow card) 74'	Stadium: Estadio Francisco de la Hera; Attendance: 4,486; Referee: (Spain) Gorka Sagues

8 December 2019 19	Las Palmas	3–1	Numancia	Las Palmas
18:00 CET (UTC+1)	Jonathan Viera 27' (pen.) 73'; Narváez 36'; Deivid (yellow card) 43'; Javi Castellano (yellow card) 68'; Kirian Rodríguez (yellow card) 80'; Benito Ramírez (yellow card) 89'	Summary	Marc Mateu (yellow card) 21'; Alberto Escassi (yellow card) 25' (goal) 81'; Nacho (yellow card) 45+1'; Ander Vidorreta (yellow card) 89'	Stadium: Estadio Gran Canaria; Attendance: 10,808; Referee: (Spain) Álvaro Moreno

15 December 2019 20	Elche	2–3	Las Palmas	Elche
18:00 CET (UTC+1)	Fidel 24' (pen.); Josan 34'; Manuel Sánchez (yellow card) 59'; Juan Cruz (yellow card) 72'; Ramón Folch (yellow card) 82'	Summary	Mantovani (yellow card) 22'; Benito Ramírez 62'; Juan Cruz 66' (o.g.); Narváez 73'	Stadium: Estadio Manuel Martínez Valero; Attendance: 10,753; Referee: (Spain) Luis Milla

21 December 2019 21	Las Palmas	1–1	Rayo Vallecano	Las Palmas
18:00 CET (UTC+1)	Narváez 6'; Aythami Artiles (yellow card) 59'; de la Bella (yellow card) 67'; Maikel Mesa (yellow card) 82'	Summary	Adri Embarba 21' (pen.); Trejo (yellow card) 29' (yellow-red card) 50'; Mario Suárez (yellow card) 69'	Stadium: Estadio Gran Canaria; Attendance: 13,574; Referee: (Spain) Saúl Ais

4 January 2020 22	Fuenlabrada	0–0	Las Palmas	Fuenlabrada
13:00 CET (UTC+1)	Hugo Fraile (yellow card) 58'; Chico (red card) 75'; Mikel Iribas (yellow card) 76'	Summary	Fabio González (yellow card) 25'; Eric Curbelo (yellow card) 35'; Araujo (yellow card) 72'; Benito Ramírez (yellow card) 82'; de la Bella (yellow card) 90+1'	Stadium: Estadio Fernando Torres; Attendance: 5,117; Referee: (Spain) Jorge Figueroa

14 January 2020 23	Las Palmas	0–1	Real Zaragoza	Las Palmas
21:30 CET (UTC+1)	Ramírez (yellow card) 39'; Aythami (yellow card) 81'; Kirian Rodríguez (yellow card) 86'	Report	Ros 83' (pen.)	Stadium: Estadio Gran Canaria; Attendance: 9,397; Referee: (Spain) Gorka Sagués Oscoz

20 January 2020 24	Racing Santander	1–1	Las Palmas	Santander
18:15 CET (UTC+1)	Ortiz (yellow card) 27'; Moi 53', (yellow card) 59'; Ruiz (yellow card) 55'	Report	Ramírez 90+1' (pen.)	Stadium: Campos de Sport de El Sardinero; Attendance: 10,732; Referee: Javier Iglesias Villanueva

25 January 2020 25	Las Palmas	0–0	Tenerife	Las Palmas
18:15 CET (UTC+1)	Ramírez (yellow card) 29'; Alberto 42'; Castellano (yellow card) 77'	Report	Sanz 17'; Ruiz (red card) 21'; Suso (yellow card) 45+2'; Gómez (yellow card) 59'; Jiménez (yellow card) 83'	Stadium: Estadio Gran Canaria; Attendance: 21,248; Referee: José Antonio López Toca

1 February 2020 26	Deportivo La Coruña	2–1	Las Palmas	A Coruña
18:15 CET (UTC+1)				Stadium: Abanca-Riazor

8 February 2020 27	Las Palmas	1–2	Cádiz	Las Palmas
18:15 CET (UTC+1)	Castro 84'	Report	Perea 18'; Álex 73' (pen.)	Stadium: Estadio Gran Canaria; Attendance: 10,846; Referee: Santiago Varón Aceitón

15 February 2020 28	Numancia	1–1	Las Palmas	Soria
18:15 CET (UTC+1)		Report		Stadium: Los Pajaritos

22 February 2020 29	Alcorcón	1–1	Las Palmas	Alcorcón
16:00 CET (UTC+1)				Stadium: Santo Domingo

8 March 2020 31	Real Sporting	4–0	Las Palmas	Gijón
18:15 CET (UTC+1)	Damián (yellow card) 1'; Vázquez 46'; Babin 49'; Murilo 73'; Méndez 85'	Report	Lemos (yellow card) 10', (red card) 92'	Stadium: El Molinón; Attendance: 18,610; Referee: De la Fuente Ramos

13 June 2020 32	Las Palmas	0–0	Girona	Las Palmas
19:30 CEST (UTC+2)		Report		Stadium: Gran Canaria; Attendance: 0

17 June 2020 33	Almería	0–1	Las Palmas	Almería
19:30 CEST (UTC+2)		Report	Castro 23'	Stadium: Juegos Mediterráneos; Attendance: 0 Referee: Dámaso Arcediano Monescillo

20 June 2020 34	Las Palmas	1–0	Lugo	Las Palmas
19:30 CEST (UTC+2)				Stadium: Estadio Gran Canaria

27 June 2020 36	Las Palmas	1–1	Elche	Las Palmas
19:30 CEST (UTC+2)	Castro 30'; Ramírez (yellow card) 35'; Mendes (yellow card) 88'; Pedri (yellow card) 90'	Report	Verdú (yellow card) 31'; Cruz 39'; Fidel (yellow card) 54'; Calvo (yellow card) 71'	Stadium: Estadio Gran Canaria; Attendance: 0 Referee: (Spain) Gorka Sagués Oscoz

2 July 2020 37	Huesca	1–0	Las Palmas	Huesca
19:30 CEST (UTC+2)	Okazaki 45+1'; Galán (yellow card) 80'	Report	Cristian (yellow card) 35'; Mantovani (yellow card) 37' (yellow-red card) 87'	Stadium: El Alcoraz; Attendance: 0 Referee: Jon Ander González Esteban

5 July 2020 38	Las Palmas	3–0	Ponferradina	Las Palmas
19:30 CEST (UTC+2)	González (yellow card) 34'; Castro 70' (pen.); Castellano (yellow card) 89'; Narváez 90+1', 90+3'	Report	Gil (yellow card) 23'; Ivi (yellow card) 35'; Rodríguez (yellow card) 61'; Valcarce (yellow card) 80'; Sielva (yellow card) 82'	Stadium: Estadio Gran Canaria; Attendance: 0 Referee: Isidro Díaz de Mera Escuderos

8 July 2020 39	Real Oviedo	2–1	Las Palmas	Oviedo
20:00 CEST (UTC+2)	Juanjo Nieto (yellow card) 24'; Ortuño 37'; Sangalli 50'; Tejera (yellow card) 90+1'	Report	Fabio (yellow card) 15'; Álex Suárez (yellow card) 55'; Lemos (yellow card) 64'; Castro 68'	Stadium: Estadio Carlos Tartiere; Attendance: 0 Referee: Alejandro Muñiz Ruiz

11 July 2020 40	Las Palmas	1–0	Mirandés	Las Palmas
19:30 CEST (UTC+2)	Mantovani (yellow card) 36'; Rodríguez (yellow card) 71'; Lemos (yellow card) 73'; Castro 85' (pen.)	Report	González (yellow card) 80'; Franquesa (yellow card) 84'; Matheus (yellow card) 85'	Stadium: Estadio Gran Canaria; Attendance: 0 Referee: Álvaro Moreno Aragón

17 July 2020 41	Rayo Vallecano	2–2	Las Palmas	Madrid
21:00 CEST (UTC+2)	Montiel 20', (yellow card) 34'; Qasmi (yellow card) 45+3'; Trejo (yellow card) 46', (goal) 49'; Isi (yellow card) 55'; García (yellow card) 80'; Dimitrievski (yellow card) 89'	Report	Lemos (yellow card) 24'; Suárez (yellow card) 26'; Castro 38' (pen.), 90' (pen.); Varela (yellow card) 83'	Stadium: Estadio de Vallecas; Attendance: 0 Referee: Luis Mario Milla Alvendiz

20 July 2020 42	Las Palmas	5–1	Extremadura	Las Palmas
18:30 CEST (UTC+2)		Report		Stadium: Estadio Gran Canaria; Attendance: 0 Referee: Javier Iglesias Villanueva

=== Copa del Rey ===
17 December 2019 First round	Castellón	0–2	Las Palmas	Castellón de la Plana
20:00	Rafa Gálvez (yellow card) 22'; David Cubillas (yellow card) 60'; Josep Calavera (yellow card) 83'	Summary	Jesús Fortes (yellow card) 49'; Juan Fernández 72'; Maikel Mesa 75'	Stadium: Nou Estadi Castàlia; Attendance: 9,700; Referee: (Spain) Rubén Ávalos

11 January 2020 Second round	Badajoz	2–1	Las Palmas	Badajoz
18:00	Álex Corredera 24'; Chris Ramos 26' (yellow card) 45+1'; Gorka Santamaría (yellow card) 68'; Adilson (yellow card) 79'; Djakaridja Traoré (yellow card) 86'	Summary	Kirian Rodríguez 53'; Fabio González (yellow card) 71'; Álex Suárez (yellow card) 89'; Josep Martínez (red card) 90+3'	Stadium: Estadio Nuevo Vivero; Attendance: 14,500; Referee: (Spain) Álvaro Moreno
