= Saúl Coco =

Equatoguinean footballer (born 1999)

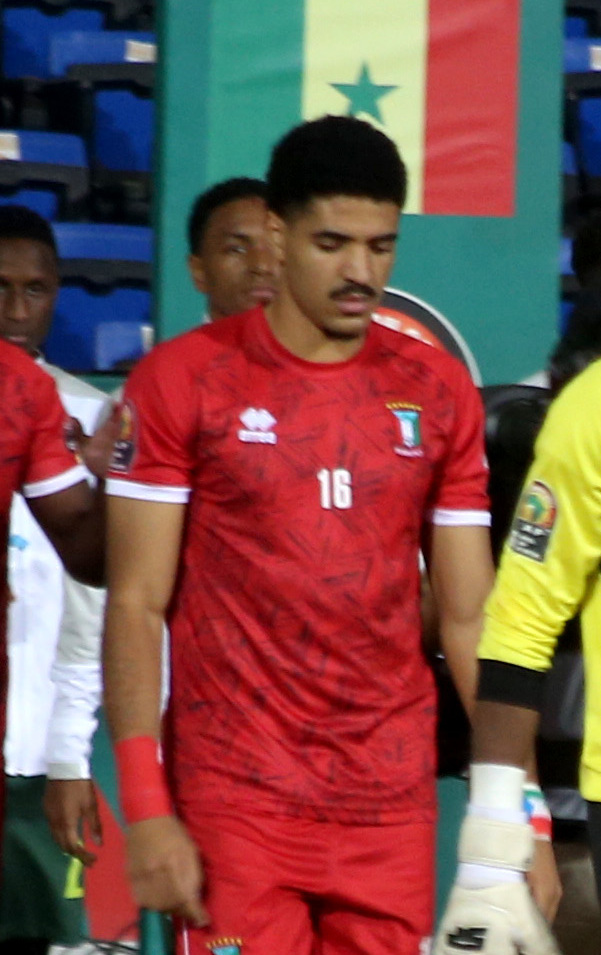
- Coco with Equatorial Guinea in 2022

Personal information
- Full name: Saúl Basilio Coco-Bassey Oubiña
- Date of birth: 9 February 1999 (age 27)
- Place of birth: Lanzarote, Spain
- Height: 1.88 m (6 ft 2 in)
- Position: Centre-back

Team information
- Current team: Torino
- Number: 23

Youth career
- Orientación Marítima
- 2013–2016: Las Palmas
- 2015–2016: → Orientación Marítima (loan)
- 2016–2018: Espanyol

Senior career*
Years	Team	Apps	(Gls)
2018–2019	Espanyol B	0	(0)
2018–2019	→ Horta (loan)	22	(0)
2020–2024	Las Palmas	79	(2)
2024–	Torino	67	(3)

International career^{‡}
2018	Equatorial Guinea U23	1	(0)
2017–	Equatorial Guinea	29	(4)
- * Club domestic league appearances and goals as of 25 May 2026 ‡ National team caps and goals as of 24 March 2025

Saúl Basilio Coco-Bassey Oubiña (born 9 February 1999), better known as Saúl Coco, is a professional footballer who plays as a centre-back for Serie A club Torino and the Equatorial Guinea national team. Born in Spain, he represents Equatorial Guinea at international level, debuting for the senior team in 2017.

== Early life ==
Coco was born in Lanzarote, Canary Islands, to Basilio Coco-Bassey Eyanga and a Spanish mother. His father is an Equatoguinean former footballer and current coach who played for Canarian club CDU Puerto del Carmen in the 1987–88 season, alongside his brother Luis (Coco's uncle). Coco is also of Nigerian descent through his paternal grandfather.

== Club career ==
Coco joined RCD Espanyol's youth setup in July 2016, after representing CD Orientación Marítima (where he was trained by his father) and UD Las Palmas. In August 2018, after finishing his formation, he was loaned to Tercera División side UA Horta for the season.

Coco made his senior debut on 18 August 2018, coming on as a second-half substitute in a 3–1 home win against UE Figueres. The following 18 July, he returned to his former club Las Palmas, being assigned to the C-team also in the fourth division.

Promoted to the reserves in Segunda División B ahead of the 2020–21 campaign, Coco made his first team debut on 17 December 2020, replacing Álvaro Lemos in a 4–0 away win against CD Varea, for the season's Copa del Rey. On 15 June 2022, he renewed his contract until 2025, being definitely promoted to the main squad.

On 15 April 2023, Coco scored his first goal at any level for Las Palmas on his 69th appearance, consolation in a 2–1 loss at Granada CF. The team ended the season with promotion to La Liga, where he scored for the first time on 8 October to open a 2–1 victory away to Villarreal CF; his 30-yard direct free kick won the La Liga Goal of the Month award.

On 17 July 2024, Coco signed for Serie A club Torino FC on a four-year contract.

== International career ==
Eligible to play internationally for Equatorial Guinea, Nigeria or Spain, Coco was called up to the senior squad of the former in August 2017. He made his full international debut on 3 September, replacing Pablo Ganet in a 1–2 friendly loss to Benin; by doing so, he became the first person from Lanzarote to get called up internationally in 67 years. The match was subsequently eliminated from FIFA records, as the referee and his assistants referees were from Equatorial Guinea.

Coco became cap-tied to Equatorial Guinea on 17 November 2018, when he appeared in an Africa Cup of Nations qualifier match against Senegal. He scored his first international goal on his sixth appearance on 7 October 2021, opening a 2–0 home win over Zambia in 2022 FIFA World Cup qualification. He played all of his team's games in their run to the quarter-finals of the 2021 Africa Cup of Nations in Cameroon, scoring in the penalty shootout win over Mali in the last 16.

== Career statistics ==
=== Club ===
As of match played 4 October 2025

Appearances and goals by club, season and competition
Club	Season	League			National cup		Total	
Club	Season	Division	Apps	Goals	Apps	Goals	Apps	Goals
Las Palmas	2020–21	Segunda División	2	0	2	0	4	0
Las Palmas	2021–22	Segunda División	11	0	1	0	12	0
Las Palmas	2022–23	Segunda División	36	1	1	0	37	1
Las Palmas	2023–24	La Liga	30	1	1	0	31	1
Las Palmas	Total		79	2	5	0	84	2
Torino	2024–25	Serie A	32	2	2	0	34	2
Torino	2025–26	Serie A	6	1	2	0	8	1
Torino	Total		38	3	4	0	42	3
Career total			117	5	9	0	126	5

=== International ===
Scores and results list Equatorial Guinea's goal tally first.

List of international goals scored by Saúl Coco
No.	Date	Venue	Opponent	Score	Result	Competition
1.	7 October 2021	Estadio de Malabo, Malabo, Equatorial Guinea	Zambia	1–0	2–0	2022 FIFA World Cup qualification
2.	16 November 2021	Stade Olympique de Nouakchott, Nouakchott, Mauritania	Mauritania	1–1	1–1	2022 FIFA World Cup qualification
3.	24 March 2023	Estadio de Malabo, Malabo, Equatorial Guinea	Botswana	1–0	2–0	2023 Africa Cup of Nations qualification
4.	24 March 2025	Orlando Stadium, Johannesburg, South Africa	Namibia	1–1	1–1	2026 FIFA World Cup qualification

== Honours ==
Individual

- La Liga Goal of the Month: October 2023
- Serie A Goal of the Month: September 2024
