= Sergi Cardona =

Spanish footballer (born 1999)

Personal information
- Full name: Sergi Cardona Bermúdez
- Date of birth: 8 July 1999 (age 27)
- Place of birth: Lloret de Mar, Spain
- Height: 1.85 m (6 ft 1 in)
- Position: Left-back

Team information
- Current team: Villarreal
- Number: 23

Youth career
- 2008–2018: Gimnàstic

Senior career*
Years	Team	Apps	(Gls)
2018–2020	Pobla Mafumet	44	(1)
2019–2020	Gimnàstic	1	(0)
2020–2021	Las Palmas B	24	(1)
2021–2024	Las Palmas	112	(2)
2024–	Villarreal	71	(2)

International career
2024–	Catalonia	2	(0)
- * Club domestic league appearances and goals as of 17 October 2026

Sergi Cardona Bermúdez (born 8 July 1999) is a Spanish professional footballer who plays as a left-back for La Liga club Villarreal.

== Career ==
=== Gimnàstic ===
Born in Lloret de Mar, Girona, Catalonia, Cardona represented Gimnàstic de Tarragona as a youth, and was promoted to the farm team on 6 July 2018. He made his senior debut on 11 September, starting in a 0–0 away draw against UE Castelldefels.

Cardona scored his first senior goal on 27 October 2018, netting the opener in a 2–0 home defeat of UA Horta. He made his professional debut the following 9 June, coming on as a second-half substitute for Pol Prats in a 1–1 home draw against CD Lugo in the Segunda División.

On 25 June 2020, Cardona left Nàstic after not accepting the offer of renewal from the club.

=== Las Palmas ===
Cardona moved to UD Las Palmas in September 2020, being initially assigned to the reserves in the Segunda División B. He made his first-team debut for the latter on 30 May 2021, starting in a 1–0 away win over UD Logroñés.

After establishing himself as a regular starter for the Canarians in the 2021–22 season, Cardona renewed his contract until 2024 on 16 June 2022, being definitely promoted to the main squad. He was also a first-choice during the 2022–23 season, contributing with 39 appearances as the club returned to La Liga after five years.

Cardona made his debut in the main category of Spanish football on 12 August 2023, replacing Daley Sinkgraven in a 1–1 home draw against RCD Mallorca. He scored his first professional goal the following 2 March, netting his team's second in a 3–3 away draw against Getafe CF.

Cardona left the Amarillos on 30 June 2024, after his contract expired.

=== Villarreal ===
On 18 July 2024, Cardona signed a three-year deal with Villarreal CF also in the top tier.

== Career statistics ==
As of match played 20 October 2026

Appearances and goals by club, season and competition
Club	Season	League			Copa del Rey		Europe		Other		Total	
Club	Season	Division	Apps	Goals	Apps	Goals	Apps	Goals	Apps	Goals	Apps	Goals
Pobla Mafumet	2018–19	Tercera División	22	1	—		—		—		22	1
Pobla Mafumet	2019–20	Tercera División	22	0	—		—		—		22	0
Pobla Mafumet	Total		44	1	—		—		—		44	1
Gimnàstic	2018–19	Segunda División	1	0	0	0	—		—		1	0
Gimnàstic	2019–20	Segunda División B	0	0	1	0	—		—		1	0
Gimnàstic	Total		1	0	1	0	—		—		2	0
Las Palmas B	2020–21	Segunda División B	24	1	—		—		—		24	1
Las Palmas	2020–21	Segunda División	1	0	0	0	—		—		1	0
Las Palmas	2021–22	Segunda División	37	0	0	0	—		2 (Note: Appearances in Segunda División promotion play-offs)	0	39	0
Las Palmas	2022–23	Segunda División	39	1	2	0	—		—		41	1
Las Palmas	2023–24	Segunda División	35	1	1	0	—		—		36	1
Las Palmas	Total		112	2	3	0	—		2	0	117	2
Villarreal	2024–25	La Liga	35	1	1	0	—		—		36	1
Villarreal	2025–26	La Liga	31	1	3	0	8 (Note: Appearances in UEFA Champions League)	0	—		42	1
Villarreal	2026–27	La Liga	5	0	0	0	3	1	—		8	1
Villarreal	Total		71	2	4	0	11	1	—		86	3
Career total			252	6	8	0	11	1	2	0	273	7

== Honours ==
Individual

- The Athletic La Liga Team of the Season: 2024–25
