= Kirian Rodríguez =

Spanish footballer (born 1996)

Personal information
- Full name: Kirian Rodríguez Concepción
- Date of birth: 5 March 1996 (age 30)
- Place of birth: Candelaria, Spain
- Height: 1.80 m (5 ft 11 in)
- Position: Central midfielder

Team information
- Current team: Las Palmas
- Number: 20

Youth career
- Tenerife
- Ofra
- 2014–2015: Las Palmas

Senior career*
Years	Team	Apps	(Gls)
2015–2018	Las Palmas C		
2018–2019	Las Palmas B	48	(4)
2019–	Las Palmas	185	(16)
- * Club domestic league appearances and goals as of 3 June 2026

Kirian Rodríguez Concepción (born 5 March 1996) is a Spanish professional footballer who plays as a central midfielder for and captains La Liga club Las Palmas.

== Career ==
Rodríguez was born in Candelaria, Santa Cruz de Tenerife, Canary Islands, and joined UD Las Palmas' youth setup in 2014, from CD Ofra. He spent his first senior years playing with the C-team in the regional leagues, before being promoted to the reserves in January 2018, after scoring 13 goals with the C's.

On 14 September 2018, Rodríguez renewed his contract with the club until 2020. He made his first-team debut the following 2 June, coming on as a second-half substitute for fellow youth graduate Fabio González in a 0–0 home draw against UD Almería in the Segunda División.

On 17 June 2019, Rodríguez was one of the five players from the B-side who were definitely promoted to the main squad. He scored his first professional goal on 20 July of the following year, netting the opener in a 5–1 home routing of Extremadura UD.

== Personal life ==
On 2 August 2022, Kirian announced through a press conference that he was diagnosed with a Hodgkin lymphoma. In February 2025, he was ruled out for the rest of the season after relapsing with cancer.

== Career statistics ==
As of match played 3 June 2026

Appearances and goals by club, season and competition
Club	Season	League			Copa del Rey		Total	
Club	Season	Division	Apps	Goals	Apps	Goals	Apps	Goals
Las Palmas	2018–19	Segunda División	2	0	0	0	2	0
Las Palmas	2019–20	Segunda División	26	1	2	1	28	2
Las Palmas	2020–21	Segunda División	33	0	2	0	35	0
Las Palmas	2021–22	Segunda División	34	5	1	0	35	5
Las Palmas	2022–23	Segunda División	5	0	0	0	0	0
Las Palmas	2023–24	La Liga	37	6	1	0	38	6
Las Palmas	2024–25	La Liga	21	0	1	0	22	0
Las Palmas	2025–26	Segunda División	27	4	0	0	27	4
Career total			185	16	7	1	192	17

== Honours ==
Individual

- La Liga Player of the Month: January 2024
- La Liga Play of the Month: November 2023 (with Alberto Moleiro)
