= Alberto Moleiro =

Spanish footballer (born 2003)

Personal information
- Full name: Alberto Moleiro González
- Date of birth: 30 September 2003 (age 23)
- Place of birth: Santa Cruz de Tenerife, Spain
- Height: 1.72 m (5 ft 8 in)
- Positions: Left winger; attacking midfielder

Team information
- Current team: Villarreal
- Number: 20

Youth career
- Sobradillo
- 2018–2021: Las Palmas

Senior career*
| Years | Team | Apps | (Gls) |
| 2019–2021 | Las Palmas B | 4 | (0) |
| 2021 | Las Palmas C | 4 | (0) |
| 2021–2025 | Las Palmas | 138 | (12) |
| 2025– | Villarreal | 50 | (12) |

International career^{‡}
| 2021–2022 | Spain U19 | 8 | (1) |
| 2022–2025 | Spain U21 | 14 | (0) |
- * Club domestic league appearances and goals as of 22 November 2026 ‡ National team caps and goals as of 21 June 2025 (UTC)

Alberto Moleiro González (born 30 September 2003) is a Spanish professional footballer who plays as a left winger or an attacking midfielder for La Liga club Villarreal CF.

== Early life ==
Moleiro was born in Santa Cruz de Tenerife, Canary Islands. His father Alfredo was born in Cuba in 1959, after Moleiro's grandfather emigrated from Spain to Cuba in the start of the 20th century. Alfredo moved to the Canary Islands in 1996, where he met Moleiro's mother Mary Paz.

== Club career ==
=== Las Palmas ===
Moleiro joined UD Las Palmas' youth setup in 2018, from CD Sobradillo. Initially assigned to the Juvenil C squad, he subsequently represented the Juvenil B and the Juvenil A squads before making his senior debut with the reserves on 15 December 2019, coming on as a second-half substitute in a 1–4 Segunda División B away loss against Coruxo FC.

Moleiro made his first team debut at the age of just 17 on 15 August 2021, replacing Maikel Mesa in a 1–1 home draw against Real Valladolid in the Segunda División championship. He scored his first professional goal on 11 September, netting the equalizer in a 1–1 home draw against UD Ibiza.

On 5 July 2022, after establishing himself as a starter, Moleiro renewed with the Amarillos until 2026. He was again an ever-present figure during the campaign, as the club achieved promotion to La Liga.

After spending the 2023 pre-season sidelined due to an injury, Moleiro made his debut in the top tier of Spanish football on 22 October, playing the last 16 minutes in a 1–0 home loss to Rayo Vallecano. He scored his first goal in the category on 11 November, netting the opener in a 1–1 away draw against CA Osasuna.

=== Villarreal ===
On 17 June 2025, after Las Palmas' relegation, Moleiro signed a five-year contract with Villarreal CF in the top tier. He made an immediate impact in his first season with the club, earning two Under‑23 Player of the Month awards for October and November. Moleiro quickly secured a place in the starting eleven and contributed to Villarreal’s strong opening to the campaign. Later that year, on 27 September, he scored his first goal for the club in a 1–0 victory over Athletic Bilbao.

== International career ==
Moleiro first appeared with the Spain under-19 team in September 2021, in two friendlies against Mexico. He scored his first goal for the side on 16 November, in a 6–0 rout of Azerbaijan.

Moleiro received his first call-up to the under-21 level in September 2022 for two friendly matches against Romania and Norway. He made his debut in the former match, coming on as a substitute in the 84th minute, replacing Beñat Turrientes.

In 2025, Moleiro was named in the squad for the 2025 UEFA European Under-21 Championship in Slovakia.

== Style of play ==
Despite being often compared to fellow Las Palmas youth graduate Pedri, Moleiro plays in a more advanced role as an attacking midfielder. Rather small in height, he is praised for his verticality, capacity to associate with teammates and shooting ability.

== Career statistics ==
As of match played 22 November 2026

Appearances and goals by club, season and competition
| Club | Season | League | | | Copa del Rey | | Europe | | Other | | Total | |
| Club | Season | Division | Apps | Goals | Apps | Goals | Apps | Goals | Apps | Goals | Apps | Goals |
|---|---|---|---|---|---|---|---|---|---|---|---|---|
| Las Palmas Atlético | 2019–20 | Segunda División B | 2 | 0 | — | | — | | — | | 2 | 0 |
| Las Palmas Atlético | 2020–21 | Segunda División B | 2 | 0 | — | | — | | — | | 2 | 0 |
| Las Palmas Atlético | Total | | 4 | 0 | — | | — | | — | | 4 | 0 |
| Las Palmas C | 2020–21 | Tercera División | 4 | 0 | — | | — | | — | | 4 | 0 |
| Las Palmas | 2021–22 | Segunda División | 35 | 3 | 1 | 0 | — | | 2 (Note: Appearances in 2022 Segunda División play-offs) | 0 | 38 | 3 |
| Las Palmas | 2022–23 | Segunda División | 40 | 0 | 2 | 0 | — | | — | | 42 | 0 |
| Las Palmas | 2023–24 | La Liga | 28 | 3 | 3 | 1 | — | | — | | 31 | 4 |
| Las Palmas | 2024–25 | La Liga | 35 | 6 | 1 | 0 | — | | — | | 36 | 6 |
| Las Palmas | Total | | 138 | 12 | 7 | 1 | — | | 2 | 0 | 147 | 13 |
| Villarreal | 2025–26 | La Liga | 37 | 10 | 1 | 0 | 7 (Note: Appearances in UEFA Champions League) | 0 | — | | 45 | 10 |
| Villarreal | 2026–27 | La Liga | 13 | 2 | 1 | 0 | 4 | 0 | — | | 18 | 2 |
| Villarreal | Total | | 50 | 12 | 2 | 0 | 11 | 0 | — | | 63 | 12 |
| Career total | | | 196 | 24 | 9 | 1 | 11 | 0 | 2 | 0 | 218 | 25 |

== Honours ==
Individual

- La Liga Play of the Month: November 2023 (with Kirian Rodríguez)
- La Liga U23 Player of the Month: September 2024, October 2025, November 2025
