= Enzo Loiodice =

French footballer (born 2000)

Personal information
- Full name: Enzo Lilian Marin Loiodice
- Date of birth: 27 November 2000 (age 25)
- Place of birth: Paris, France
- Height: 1.76 m (5 ft 9 in)
- Position: Midfielder

Team information
- Current team: Las Palmas
- Number: 12

Youth career
- 2007–2011: SC Paris
- 2011–2015: Gobelins
- 2015–2018: Dijon

Senior career*
Years	Team	Apps	(Gls)
2018–2020	Dijon II	15	(1)
2018–2020	Dijon	21	(0)
2020	→ Wolverhampton Wanderers (loan)	0	(0)
2020–	Las Palmas	161	(6)

International career
2018	France U19	3	(0)
2018–2019	France U20	10	(0)
- * Club domestic league appearances and goals as of 3 June 2026

Enzo Lilian Marin Loiodice (born 27 November 2000) is a French professional footballer who plays as a midfielder for La Liga club Las Palmas.

== Club career ==
=== Dijon ===
Loiodice joined the Dijon youth academy in 2015, moving from FC Gobelins. He made his professional debut for Dijon in a 3–1 Ligue 1 loss to Bordeaux on 28 April 2018.

On 3 July 2018, Loiodice signed his first professional contract with Dijon for three years. On 25 August 2018, Loiodice provided an assist, in an impressive performance against Nice in a 4–0 win. He was named in L'Equipe's team of the week following this performance (Matchday 3).

==== Wolverhampton Wanderers (loan) ====
On 29 January 2020, he moved on loan to Premier League club Wolverhampton Wanderers, with the intention to spend the remainder of the season with their under-23 side with a view to a permanent transfer. However, the COVID-19 pandemic caused the game to be suspended in England, cutting any opportunities for Loiodice to impress and he instead returned to France in early June.

=== Las Palmas ===
On 18 August 2020, Loiodice switched teams and countries again, after agreeing to a three-year contract with Segunda División side UD Las Palmas.

== International career ==
Loiodice was born in France and is of Italian descent. He is a youth international for France. Loiodice was named in the French squad for the FIFA U-20 World Cup in Poland. Despite being the youngest member of the squad he started for France in their opening two games against Saudi Arabia (2–0 win) and Panama (2–0 win). He was rested for the third game as France had already qualified. Loiodice returned to the starting eleven in the next round against the United States as France lost narrowly 3–2.

== Career statistics ==
As of match played 3 June 2026

Appearances and goals by club, season and competition
Club	Season	League			National cup		League cup		Continental		Other		Total	
Club	Season	Division	Apps	Goals	Apps	Goals	Apps	Goals	Apps	Goals	Apps	Goals	Apps	Goals
Dijon II	2017–18	Championnat National 3	6	0	—		—		—		—		6	0
Dijon II	2018–19	Championnat National 3	4	0	—		—		—		—		4	0
Dijon II	2019–20	Championnat National 3	5	1	—		—		—		—		5	1
Dijon II	Total		15	1	—		—		—		—		15	1
Dijon	2017–18	Ligue 1	4	0	0	0	0	0	—		—		4	0
Dijon	2018–19	Ligue 1	12	0	2	0	0	0	—		0	0	14	0
Dijon	2019–20	Ligue 1	5	0	0	0	1	0	—		—		6	0
Dijon	Total		21	0	2	0	1	0	—		0	0	24	0
Las Palmas	2020–21	Segunda División	15	1	0	0	—		—		—		15	1
Las Palmas	2021–22	Segunda División	24	1	0	0	—		—		0	0	24	1
Las Palmas	2022–23	Segunda División	39	4	2	0	—		—		—		41	4
Las Palmas	2023–24	La Liga	34	0	3	0	—		—		—		37	0
Las Palmas	2024–25	La Liga	17	0	3	0	—		—		—		20	0
Las Palmas	2025–26	La Liga	32	0	1	0	—		—		—		33	0
Las Palmas	Total		161	6	9	0	—		—		0	0	170	6
Career total			187	7	8	0	1	0	0	0	0	0	196	7
