= Pau Miguélez =

Spanish footballer

Personal information
- Full name: Paulino Miguélez Fernández
- Date of birth: 23 January 1999 (age 27)
- Place of birth: Noja, Spain
- Height: 1.74 m (5 ft 9 in)
- Position: Winger

Team information
- Current team: Gimnástica Segoviana
- Number: 24

Youth career
- Racing Santander

Senior career*
Years	Team	Apps	(Gls)
2015–2017	Racing B	38	(11)
2015–2018	Racing Santander	27	(0)
2018–2019	Peralada	37	(7)
2019–2020	Sevilla B	9	(0)
2020–2021	Las Palmas B	24	(1)
2021	Las Palmas	3	(0)
2021–2022	Hércules	18	(2)
2022–2023	Zamora	29	(1)
2023–2024	Calahorra	13	(1)
2024	Steaua București	6	(0)
2024–2025	SD Logroñés	31	(9)
2025–	Gimnástica Segoviana	31	(3)

International career
2014–2015	Spain U16	9	(3)
2015–2016	Spain U17	6	(0)
2017	Spain U18	2	(0)
- * Club domestic league appearances and goals as of 7 May 2026

Paulino "Pau" Miguélez Fernández (born 23 January 1999) is a Spanish footballer who plays for Segunda Federación club Gimnástica Segoviana as a left winger.

== Club career ==
Born in Noja, Cantabria, Miguélez was a Racing de Santander youth graduate. He made his senior – and first team – debut on 23 August 2015 at the age of 16, playing the last 12 minutes of a 0–1 Segunda División B away loss against Celta de Vigo B; he spent the campaign switching between the main squad and the reserves in the Tercera División.

Miguélez scored his first senior goal on 22 August 2016, netting a brace with the B's in a 5–1 away routing of Selaya FC. He only started to feature regularly for the first team in the 2017–18 season, with the side still in the third division.

On 20 July 2018, Miguélez signed a three-year deal with Girona FC, being assigned to the farm team also in the third tier. On 10 July of the following year, he moved to another reserve team, Sevilla Atlético in the same category.

On 29 January 2020, Miguélez joined UD Las Palmas, being assigned to the B-side still in division three. He made his professional debut on 10 January of the following year, coming on as a late substitute for Kirian Rodríguez in a 1–0 away win against RCD Mallorca in the Segunda División.

On 13 July 2021, Miguélez signed a one-year contract with Hércules CF of the Segunda División RFEF.

He transferred to Zamora CF in July 2022, before signing for CD Calahorra in August 2023. He left Calahorra by mutual consent in January 2024.

On 14 January 2024, Miguélez signed for Romanian side Steaua București.

On 10 July 2024, Miguélez joined SD Logroñés in Segunda Federación.
