= Jesús Fortes =

Spanish footballer

Personal information
- Full name: Jesús Fortes Socas
- Date of birth: 22 June 1997 (age 29)
- Place of birth: Santa Cruz de Tenerife, Spain
- Height: 1.78 m (5 ft 10 in)
- Position: Right back

Team information
- Current team: Marino

Youth career
- Las Zocas
- Marino
- 2013–2016: Las Palmas

Senior career*
Years	Team	Apps	(Gls)
2016–2017	Las Palmas C		
2017–2020	Las Palmas B	75	(1)
2019	Las Palmas	1	(0)
2020–2021	Yeclano	14	(0)
2022	Marino	9	(0)
2022–2024	Peña Deportiva	34	(2)
2024–2025	Alzira	10	(0)
2025–	Marino	2	(0)
- * Club domestic league appearances and goals as of 13 September 2025

Jesús Fortes Socas (born 22 June 1997) is a Spanish footballer who plays for Tercera Federación club Marino as a right back.

== Club career ==
Fortes was born in Santa Cruz de Tenerife, Canary Islands and joined UD Las Palmas' youth setup in 2013, after representing CD Marino and UD Las Zocas. After finishing his formation, he suffered a knee injury which took him out for the majority of the 2016–17 campaign; upon returning, he started playing as a senior with the C-team to build match fitness.

Fortes was definitely promoted to the reserves in July 2017, with the side in Segunda División B, and started to feature regularly afterwards. On 12 May 2019, he made his first team debut by starting in a 1–0 Segunda División home win against Córdoba CF.
