= Pol Salvador =

Spanish footballer (born 2001)

Personal information
- Full name: Pol Salvador Hernández
- Date of birth: 2 April 2001 (age 25)
- Place of birth: Camprodon, Spain
- Height: 1.82 m (6 ft 0 in)
- Position: Attacking midfielder

Team information
- Current team: Vorwärts Steyr

Youth career
- 2012–2014: Espanyol
- Villarreal
- Mataró
- 2018–2020: Las Palmas

Senior career*
Years	Team	Apps	(Gls)
2019–2021	Las Palmas C	9	(0)
2020–2025	Las Palmas	2	(0)
2021–2025	Las Palmas B	35	(1)
2025	Unión Sur Yaiza	6	(0)
2025–	Vorwärts Steyr	1	(0)
- * Club domestic league appearances and goals as of 05:52, 12 August 2025 (UTC)

Pol Salvador Hernández (born 2 April 2001) is a Spanish footballer who plays for Vorwärts Steyr as an attacking midfielder.

== Club career ==
Born in Camprodon, Girona, Catalonia, Salvador joined UD Las Palmas' youth setup in 2018, from CE Mataró. On 26 February 2019, he renewed his contract with the Canarians.

Salvador made his senior debut with the C-team on 19 April 2019, starting in a 0–0 away draw against CD El Cotillo. On 20 July of the following year, before even having appeared for the reserves, he made his first team debut by coming on as a late substitute for Josemi Castañeda in a 5–1 home routing of Extremadura UD in the Segunda División; he had to leave the field shortly after coming in due to a head trauma after a shock with fellow debutant Álex Domínguez.
