= Unai Veiga =

Spanish footballer

- Veiga in 2023 while on trial at Go Ahead Eagles

Personal information
- Full name: Unai Veiga González
- Date of birth: 9 October 1998 (age 28)
- Place of birth: Portugalete, Spain
- Height: 1.89 m (6 ft 2 in)
- Position: Midfielder

Team information
- Current team: Sámano
- Number: 16

Youth career
- 2008–2012: Athletic Bilbao
- 2012–2014: Danok Bat
- 2014–2017: Real Sociedad

Senior career*
Years	Team	Apps	(Gls)
2017–2018	Real Sociedad C	24	(7)
2018–2021	Real Sociedad B	63	(5)
2021–2023	Las Palmas	2	(0)
2022–2023	→ Algeciras (loan)	18	(0)
2023	→ Unionistas (loan)	9	(0)
2023	Landskrona	3	(0)
2024	Alzira	5	(0)
2024–2025	Ordino	18	(1)
2025–	Sámano	33	(0)
- * Club domestic league appearances and goals as of 14 May 2026

Unai Veiga González (born 9 October 1998) is a Spanish footballer who plays as a midfielder for Segunda Federación club Sámano.

== Career ==
Born in Portugalete, Biscay, Basque Country, Veiga played for Athletic Bilbao and Danok Bat CF before joining Real Sociedad's youth setup in June 2014. He made his senior debut with the latter's C-team on 26 August 2017, playing the last 25 minutes in a 2–0 Tercera División away loss against SCD Durango.

Veiga scored his first senior goal on 23 September 2017, in a 2–1 win at SD Deusto, and scored a brace in a 4–0 away success over Sodupe UC the following 14 April. After scoring seven goals for the C's, he first appeared with the reserves on 13 May 2018 by starting in a 3–1 away defeat of Peña Sport FC in the Segunda División B.

On 18 July 2019, after featuring regularly for the B-team, Veiga renewed his contract until 2021. He contributed with one goal in 18 appearances overall during the 2020–21 campaign, as his club returned to the Segunda División after 59 years.

On 3 June 2021, Veiga signed a three-year contract with UD Las Palmas in the second division. He made his professional debut on 3 October, coming on as a second-half substitute for Fabio González in a 4–1 home routing of FC Cartagena.

On 4 August 2022, Veiga was loaned to Primera Federación side Algeciras CF for the season. The following 24 January, he moved to fellow league team Unionistas de Salamanca CF also in a temporary deal. Upon returning, he terminated his contract with Las Palmas on 7 July 2023.

On 30 August 2023, Veiga signed with Swedish Superettan side Landskrona BoIS, on a contract until end of 2023, with option to extend with an option year.
