= Ale García (footballer) =

Spanish footballer

Personal information
- Full name: Pedro Alejandro García Mejías
- Date of birth: 19 March 2003 (age 23)
- Place of birth: Las Palmas, Spain
- Height: 1.81 m (5 ft 11 in)
- Position: Winger

Team information
- Current team: Las Palmas
- Number: 22

Youth career
- Vecinklubf
- Estrella
- 2019–2021: Las Palmas

Senior career*
Years	Team	Apps	(Gls)
2021–2023	Las Palmas B	30	(2)
2021–	Las Palmas	37	(7)
2023–2024	→ Antequera (loan)	35	(7)
2024–2025	→ Atlético Madrid B (loan)	14	(1)

International career^{‡}
2021	Spain U19	4	(2)
- * Club domestic league appearances and goals as of 3 June 2026 ‡ National team caps and goals as of 28 October 2021

Pedro Alejandro "Ale" García Mejías (born 19 March 2003) is a Spanish footballer who plays for UD Las Palmas. Mainly a right winger, he can also play as a forward.

== Club career ==
Born in Las Palmas, Canary Islands, García joined UD Las Palmas' youth setup in 2019, from Estrella CF. On 4 June 2021, he was called up to make the pre-season with the main squad by manager Pepe Mel.

On 11 September 2021, before even having appeared for the reserves, García made his first team debut by coming on as a late substitute for Jesé in a 1–1 Segunda División home draw against UD Ibiza. On 4 July 2023, he was loaned to Primera Federación side Antequera CF for the season.

On 22 June 2024, García renewed his contract with the Amarillos until 2027, and was loaned to Atlético Madrid B also in the third division on 10 August. Upon returning, he further extended his link until 2029 on 29 July 2025.
