= Pejiño =

Spanish footballer (born 1996)

Personal information
- Full name: Francisco Jesús Crespo García
- Date of birth: 29 July 1996 (age 30)
- Place of birth: Barbate, Spain
- Height: 1.77 m (5 ft 10 in)
- Position: Winger

Team information
- Current team: Eibar

Youth career
- Barbate
- Cádiz

Senior career*
Years	Team	Apps	(Gls)
2015–2017	Cádiz B	30	(13)
2015–2016	→ Los Barrios (loan)	15	(2)
2016	→ Conil (loan)	7	(2)
2017–2018	Sevilla C	25	(8)
2018–2020	Sevilla B	46	(4)
2018	Sevilla	0	(0)
2020–2026	Las Palmas	113	(19)
2025	→ Elche (loan)	12	(1)
2026–	Eibar	0	(0)
- * Club domestic league appearances and goals as of 3 June 2026

Francisco Jesús Crespo García (born 29 July 1996), commonly known as Pejiño, is a Spanish professional footballer who plays as a left winger for SD Eibar.

== Career ==
=== Cádiz ===
Born in Barbate, Cádiz, Andalusia, Pejiño was a Cádiz CF youth graduate. On 16 July 2015, he was loaned to Tercera División side UD Los Barrios, and made his senior debut on 23 August of that year by coming on as a substitute in a 0–0 home draw against AD Ceuta FC.

Pejiño scored his first two senior goals on 4 November 2015 in a 4–3 home win against CD Utrera. The following January, he terminated his loan and moved to fellow fourth division side Conil CF, also in a temporary deal.

Pejiño returned to Cádiz during the 2016–17 campaign, and was assigned to the reserves in the regional leagues. On 18 September 2016, he scored a hat-trick in a 7–0 Primera Andaluza home rout of CD Pinzón.

=== Sevilla ===
On 26 July 2017, free agent Pejiño signed for Sevilla FC and was assigned to the C team, also in the fourth division. The following 4 February he made his professional debut with the B-side, replacing Giorgi Aburjania in a 0–1 home loss against SD Huesca in the Segunda División.

On 26 June 2018, Pejiño renewed his contract with the Nervionenses until 2022, being definitely promoted to the reserve squad now in the Segunda División B. He made his first-team debut exactly one month later, replacing Pablo Sarabia in a 4–0 UEFA Europa League home win over Újpest FC.

Pejiño featured sparingly in the main squad under Pablo Machín, but went on to appear exclusively for the B-side after the manager's dismissal. On 23 June 2020, he terminated his contract with the club.

=== Las Palmas ===
On 27 August 2020, Pejiño signed a two-year deal with UD Las Palmas in the second division. He scored a career-best seven goals during the 2022–23 season, helping his side to achieve promotion to La Liga.

Pejiño made his debut in the top tier of Spanish football at the age of 27 on 18 August 2023, playing the last 26 minutes in a 1–0 away loss to Valencia CF. He scored his first goal in the category on 17 December, netting the opener in a 1–1 home draw against Cádiz CF.

On 3 February 2025, after featuring in only one league match during the first half of the campaign, Pejiño moved on loan to Elche CF until the end of the second-tier season. Upon returning, he featured sparingly before leaving the club in June 2026, as his contract expired.

=== Eibar ===
On 3 July 2026, free agent Pejiño agered to a two-year deal with SD Eibar, still in division two.
