= Benito Ramírez =

Spanish footballer

Personal information
- Full name: Benito Ramírez del Toro
- Date of birth: 11 July 1995 (age 31)
- Place of birth: La Aldea, Spain
- Height: 1.79 m (5 ft 10 in)
- Position: Winger

Team information
- Current team: Cartagena
- Number: 21

Youth career
- San Nicolás
- 2010–2014: Las Palmas

Senior career*
| Years | Team | Apps | (Gls) |
| 2013–2018 | Las Palmas B | 109 | (18) |
| 2014–2015 | Las Palmas C | | |
| 2017–2025 | Las Palmas | 147 | (7) |
| 2018–2019 | → Rayo Majadahonda (loan) | 28 | (1) |
| 2025 | Vanspor | 3 | (0) |
| 2026– | Cartagena | 8 | (1) |
- * Club domestic league appearances and goals as of 10 June 2026

Benito Ramírez del Toro (born 11 July 1995), simply known as Benito, is a Spanish professional footballer who plays for Primera Federación club Cartagena. Mainly a winger, he can also play as a left-back.

== Career ==
Born in La Aldea de San Nicolás, Las Palmas, Canary Islands, Benito joined UD Las Palmas' youth setup in 2010, after starting it out at UD San Nicolás. He made his debut as a senior with the reserves during the 2012–13 season, achieving promotion from Tercera División.

Regularly used during the 2013–14 campaign, Benito suffered an injury in April 2014 and remained sidelined for nearly six months. Upon returning, he was assigned to the C-team in the regional leagues.

On 8 July 2016, already back in the B-side, Benito signed a new two-year deal with the club, with an option for a third. The following 20 January he made his first team – and La Liga – debut, coming on as a late substitute for goalscorer Mateo García in a 1–1 home draw against Deportivo de La Coruña.

On 16 June 2017, Benito was promoted to the main squad for the pre-season, but spent the majority of the campaign with the B-side. On 13 June of the following year, he was definitely promoted to the main squad in Segunda División.

On 31 August 2018, after renewing his contract until 2021, Benito was loaned to fellow second division side CF Rayo Majadahonda for one year. He scored his first professional goal on 10 March of the following year, netting the opener in a 2–0 home defeat of AD Alcorcón.

Upon returning, Benito was definitely assigned to Las Palmas' first team, and renewed his contract with the club until 2024 on 19 October 2020. On 21 June 2023, despite spending the second half of the 2022–23 campaign nursing a back injury, he further extended his link until 2025.
