= Pinchi =

Spanish footballer (born 1996)

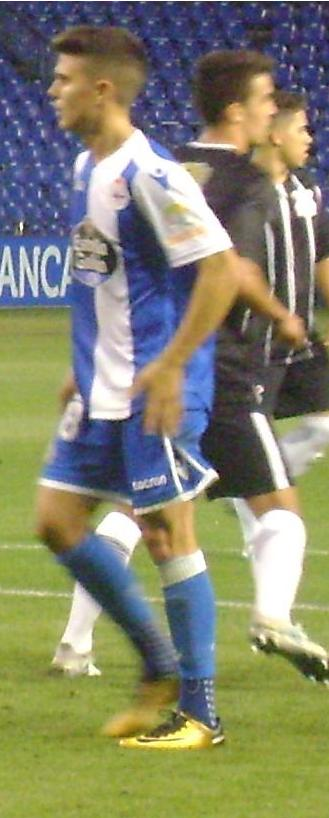
- Pinchi with Deportivo de La Coruña in 2017

Personal information
- Full name: Óscar Francisco García Quintela
- Date of birth: 17 January 1996 (age 30)
- Place of birth: A Coruña, Spain
- Height: 1.71 m (5 ft 7 in)
- Position: Winger

Team information
- Current team: Anagennisi Karditsa
- Number: 28

Youth career
- 2005–2015: Deportivo La Coruña

Senior career*
Years	Team	Apps	(Gls)
2013–2018	Deportivo B	29	(6)
2015–2017	Deportivo La Coruña	1	(0)
2018–2019	Atlético Madrid B	33	(9)
2019–2021	Extremadura	38	(5)
2020–2021	→ Fuenlabrada (loan)	27	(3)
2021–2023	Las Palmas	16	(0)
2022–2023	→ Mirandés (loan)	38	(6)
2023–2024	Çaykur Rizespor	13	(0)
2024	→ Racing de Ferrol (loan)	11	(1)
2024–2025	Esenler Erokspor	28	(4)
2025–2026	Volos	12	(0)
2026	Extremadura	6	(0)
2026–	Anagennisi Karditsa	0	(0)
- * Club domestic league appearances and goals as of 15 May 2026

Óscar Francisco García Quintela (born 17 January 1996), commonly known as Pinchi, is a Spanish professional footballer who plays as a winger for Super League Greece 2 club Anagennisi Karditsa.

== Career ==
Born in A Coruña, Galicia, Pinchi joined Deportivo de La Coruña's youth setup in 2005 at the age of nine. He made his debut as a senior with the reserves in 2012, representing the side in Tercera División.

Pinchi made his official debut for the first team on 16 December 2015, coming on as a second-half substitute for Luis Alberto in a 1–1 home draw against UE Llagostera, for the season's Copa del Rey. His La Liga debut came on 20 January 2017, replacing Joselu in an away draw against UD Las Palmas for the same scoreline.

On 27 June 2018, Pinchi left Dépor and joined Atlético de Madrid, being assigned to the reserves in Segunda División B. On 19 July of the following year, he agreed to a three-year contract with Segunda División side Extremadura UD.

Pinchi scored his first professional goal on 8 February 2020, netting his team's second in a 2–4 home loss against CD Tenerife. On 12 July, he scored a brace in a 3–2 win at former side Deportivo, and finished the campaign with five goals as his side suffered relegation.

On 9 September 2020, Pinchi was loaned to CF Fuenlabrada in the second division, for one year. The following 19 July, he moved to fellow league team UD Las Palmas on a three-year contract.

On 30 August 2022, Pinchi was loaned to CD Mirandés also in the second division, for one year. On 10 August of the following year, he was transferred to Turkish Süper Lig club Çaykur Rizespor.

On 1 February 2024, Pinchi returned to Spain and its second division, after agreeing to a loan deal with Racing de Ferrol.
