= Eric Curbelo =

Spanish footballer

Personal information
- Full name: Eric Curbelo de la Fe
- Date of birth: 14 January 1994 (age 32)
- Place of birth: Santa Brígida, Spain
- Height: 1.81 m (5 ft 11 in)
- Position: Centre-back

Youth career
- Estrella Roja
- Villa Santa Brígida
- Universidad LP
- Las Palmas
- Telde

Senior career*
Years	Team	Apps	(Gls)
2013–2015	Telde	55	(2)
2015	Leioa	5	(0)
2016–2018	Las Palmas B	80	(3)
2019–2024	Las Palmas	152	(4)
2024–2026	Sporting Gijón	32	(0)
- * Club domestic league appearances and goals as of 6 June 2026

Eric Curbelo de la Fe (born 14 January 1994) is a Spanish professional footballer. Mainly a centre-back, he can also play as a right-back.

== Career ==
=== Early career ===
Born in Santa Brígida, Las Palmas, Canary Islands, Curbelo finished his formation with UD Telde, making his senior debut during the 2013–14 season, in Tercera División. On 20 August 2015, he signed a contract with Segunda División B side SD Leioa, but terminated his link in December after being rarely used.

=== Las Palmas ===
On 28 December 2015, Curbelo joined UD Las Palmas, club he already represented as a youth, and was assigned to the reserves in the fourth division. On 2 January 2019, he was definitely promoted to the main squad in Segunda División.

Curbelo made his professional debut on 7 January 2019, starting as a right back in a 0–0 away draw against CF Rayo Majadahonda. He scored his first goal on 20 April, but in a 4–2 loss to Albacete Balompié.

Curbelo established himself as a starter for the Amarillos in the 2019–20 season, and renewed his contract until 2024 on 14 June 2022. He scored twice in 35 appearances overall during the 2022–23 campaign, achieving promotion to La Liga.

Curbelo made his top tier debut on 27 September 2023, starting in a 2–0 away loss to Real Madrid. The following 30 June, after just one further league appearance in the season, he left as his contract expired.

=== Sporting Gijón ===
On 10 July 2024, free agent Curbelo signed a two-year deal with Sporting de Gijón in division two.
