= Álvaro Lemos =

Spanish footballer

Personal information
- Full name: Álvaro Lemos Collazo
- Date of birth: 30 March 1993 (age 33)
- Place of birth: Santiago de Compostela, Spain
- Height: 1.75 m (5 ft 9 in)
- Positions: Right-back; winger

Youth career
- 1999–2005: Villestro
- 2005–2011: Deportivo La Coruña

Senior career*
Years	Team	Apps	(Gls)
2011–2015	Deportivo B	56	(14)
2014–2015	→ Compostela (loan)	16	(1)
2015–2016	Lugo	22	(0)
2016–2018	Celta	5	(1)
2017–2018	→ Lens (loan)	6	(0)
2018	→ Lugo (loan)	8	(0)
2018–2024	Las Palmas	151	(7)
2024–2026	Oviedo	9	(0)
2026	Granada	9	(0)

International career^{‡}
2024	Galicia	1	(0)
- * Club domestic league appearances and goals as of 9 June 2026 ‡ National team caps and goals as of 14:25, 26 May 2025 (UTC)

Álvaro Lemos Collazo (born 30 March 1993) is a Spanish professional footballer who plays as a right-back or a right winger.

== Career ==
Born in Santiago de Compostela, Galicia, Lemos joined Deportivo de La Coruña's youth setup in 2005 at the age of 12, after starting out at SD Villestro. He made his senior debuts with the former's reserves in 2011, in Tercera División.

In July 2013, after making the pre-season with the first team, Lemos suffered a serious knee injury, only returning to the fields in March of the following year. On 21 July 2014 he was loaned to Segunda División B club SD Compostela, for one year.

Lemos struggled with injuries during his time at Compos, appearing in just 19 competitive games. On 17 July 2015, he signed with CD Lugo from Segunda División after agreeing to a three-year deal.

On 9 September 2015, Lemos played his first professional match, coming on as a second-half substitute for David Ferreiro in a 1–0 away win against Córdoba CF for the season's Copa del Rey. On 27 January of the following year he was handed a professional contract, being assigned the no. 14 jersey.

On 5 July 2016, Lemos moved to La Liga side Celta de Vigo for five years. He first appeared in the competition the following 28 January, starting and scoring the first goal in a 2–0 success at CD Leganés, where he had already made his professional debut with his previous team.

On 10 January 2018, after a six-month loan spell at RC Lens, Lemos returned to Lugo also in a temporary deal. On 19 June, he signed a three-year contract with UD Las Palmas.

On 16 August 2022, after establishing himself as a starter, Lemos renewed his contract until 2025. He was mainly a backup option to Álex Suárez in the 2022–23 season, scoring once in 26 matches overall as the Amarillos achieved promotion to the top tier.

On 17 July 2024, after another year of little playing time, Lemos terminated his contract with Las Palmas, and signed a one-year deal with Real Oviedo in the second division two days later. In March 2025, he suffered a serious knee injury, which led him to remain unregistered for the first half of the 2025–26 season.

After fully recovering, Lemos terminated his link with the Carbayones on 12 January 2026, and agreed to a six-month deal with Granada CF in division two five days later.
