= Maikel Mesa =

Spanish footballer (born 1991)

Personal information
- Full name: Maikel Mesa Piñero
- Date of birth: 4 June 1991 (age 35)
- Place of birth: Santa Cruz de Tenerife, Spain
- Height: 1.88 m (6 ft 2 in)
- Position: Midfielder

Youth career
- Arenas
- Tenerife

Senior career*
Years	Team	Apps	(Gls)
2010–2012	Laguna	69	(20)
2012–2014	Osasuna B	50	(15)
2013–2016	Osasuna	18	(1)
2015	→ Racing Ferrol (loan)	13	(3)
2016–2017	Mirandés	35	(6)
2017–2018	Gimnàstic	36	(8)
2018–2022	Las Palmas	79	(8)
2020	→ Albacete (loan)	14	(3)
2022–2023	Albacete	37	(8)
2023–2024	Zaragoza	41	(11)
2024–2026	Tenerife	47	(6)
- * Club domestic league appearances and goals as of 22:33, 4 June 2026 (UTC)

Maikel Mesa Piñero (born 4 June 1991) is a Spanish professional footballer who plays as a midfielder.

== Club career ==
Born in Santa Cruz de Tenerife, Canary Islands, Mesa finished his youth career with hometown club CD Tenerife. He made his senior debut with neighbouring CD Laguna in the 2010–11 season, in the Tercera División.

Mesa signed a two-year contract with CA Osasuna in July 2012, initially being assigned to the reserves in the Segunda División B. On 1 June 2013, he made his La Liga debut, coming on as a substitute for Francisco Silva in the 78th minute of a 4–2 away loss against Real Madrid.

On 30 January 2015, Mesa was loaned to third tier side Racing de Ferrol until June. After his loan expired, he was included in the main squad and began to appear more regularly. He scored his first goal as a professional on 24 January 2016, the last in a 3–0 home win over UE Llagostera.

On 21 June 2016, three days after achieving promotion to the top flight, Mesa was released and joined CD Mirandés on 13 July. On 29 June 2017, after suffering relegation, he agreed to a two-year deal at Gimnàstic de Tarragona also in the second division.

Mesa was transferred to UD Las Palmas in his native region on 17 August 2018, signing a four-year contract. On 11 January 2020, he was loaned to Albacete Balompié of the same league until the end of the campaign.

On 25 July 2022, Mesa returned to Estadio Carlos Belmonte on a permanent one-year deal. The following 13 June, after scoring nine goals in 41 competitive games during the season, he moved to fellow second-tier side Real Zaragoza on a two-year contract.

Mesa returned to his former youth club Tenerife on 27 July 2024, with the 33-year-old agreeing to a three-year deal. On 30 June 2026, after helping in their promotion from Primera Federación, he left.
