= Fabio González =

Spanish footballer

Personal information
- Full name: Fabio González Estupiñán
- Date of birth: 12 February 1997 (age 29)
- Place of birth: Ingenio, Spain
- Height: 1.76 m (5 ft 9 in)
- Position: Central midfielder

Team information
- Current team: Racing Ferrol
- Number: 6

Youth career
- Las Palmas

Senior career*
Years	Team	Apps	(Gls)
2016–2019	Las Palmas B	93	(2)
2017–2025	Las Palmas	119	(0)
2025	Tenerife	13	(0)
2026–	Racing Ferrol	15	(0)
- * Club domestic league appearances and goals as of 9 June 2026

Fabio González Estupiñán (born 12 February 1997) is a Spanish professional footballer who plays as a central midfielder for Primera Federación club Racing Ferrol.

== Career ==
Born in Ingenio, Las Palmas, Canary Islands, Fabio was an UD Las Palmas youth graduate. He made his senior debut with the reserves on 10 September 2016, starting in a 1–1 Tercera División away draw against UD Ibarra.

Fabio scored his first senior goal on 7 January 2017, netting the game's only in an away success over CD Buzanada. He made his first team – and La Liga – debut on 26 August, starting in a 5–1 home loss against Atlético Madrid.

On 17 June 2019, Fabio was definitely promoted to the main squad, now in Segunda División. On 21 June 2022, after establishing himself as a starter, he renewed his contract until 2025.

Also regularly used in the 2022–23 season as the club achieved promotion to the top tier, Fabio spent most of the 2023–24 campaign sidelined due to injuries. On 2 January 2025, he terminated his link with the Amarillos, and moved to rivals CD Tenerife on a six-month deal just hours later.
