= UD Las Palmas C =

Spanish football team

Las Palmas C
- Full name: Unión Deportiva Las Palmas S.A.D. "C"
- Founded: 2006 (reactivated in 2011)
- Ground: Anexo, Las Palmas, Canary Islands, Spain
- Capacity: 500
- President: Miguel Ángel Ramírez Alonso
- Head coach: Ángel Sánchez
- League: Tercera Federación – Group 12
- 2025–26: Tercera Federación – Group 12, 6th of 18
Home colours	Away colours

Unión Deportiva Las Palmas C is the second reserve team of UD Las Palmas, club based in Las Palmas, in the autonomous community of the Canary Islands. It plays in Tercera Federación – Group 12, holding home games at Anexo del Estadio Gran Canaria, which holds 500 spectators.

A second reserve team behind UD Las Palmas Atlético, the club was founded in 2006 and reached the highest division of regional football, the Preferente, before folding in 2010 and being re-created the following season. In 2017, the club achieved promotion to Tercera División for the first time ever.

== Season to season ==
Season	Tier	Division	Place
2006–07	7	2ª Reg.	1st
2007–08	6	1ª Reg.	2nd
2008–09	6	1ª Reg.	1st
2009–10	5	Int. Pref.	6th
2010–11	DNP		
2011–12	7	2ª Reg.	1st
2012–13	6	1ª Reg.	1st
2013–14	5	Int. Pref.	4th
2014–15	5	Int. Pref.	3rd
2015–16	5	Int. Pref.	4th
2016–17	5	Int. Pref.	1st
2017–18	4	3ª	6th
2018–19	4	3ª	6th
2019–20	4	3ª	15th
2020–21	4	3ª	3rd / 6th
2021–22	5	3ª RFEF	2nd
2022–23	6	Int. Pref.	1st
2023–24	6	Int. Pref.	1st
2024–25	6	Int. Pref.	1st
2025–26	5	3ª Fed.	6th

Season	Tier	Division	Place
2026–27	5	3ª Fed.	

- 4 seasons in Tercera División
- 3 seasons in Tercera Federación/Tercera División RFEF
