= Adnane Ghailan =

Moroccan footballer (born 2000)

Personal information
- Full name: Adnane Ghailan Benktib
- Date of birth: 17 October 2000 (age 26)
- Place of birth: Tangier, Morocco
- Height: 1.87 m (6 ft 2 in)
- Position: Winger

Team information
- Current team: Córdoba
- Number: 14

Youth career
- Mataró

Senior career*
Years	Team	Apps	(Gls)
2018–2019	Mataró	2	(0)
2019–2022	Vilassar Mar B	39	(24)
2020–2022	Vilassar Mar	12	(0)
2022–2024	Europa B	29	(13)
2023–2026	Europa	85	(17)
2026–	Córdoba	1	(0)
- * Club domestic league appearances and goals as of 16 August 2026

Adnane Ghailan Benktib (born 17 October 2000), sometimes known as just Adnane, is a Moroccan professional footballer who plays as a winger for Spanish club Córdoba CF.

== Career ==
Born in Tangier, Adnane moved to Mataró at early age and grew up in Rocafonda, the same neighborhood as Lamine Yamal. He played for local side CE Mataró during the most of his youth setup, and made his first team debut on 14 October 2018, in a 2–0 Segona Catalana home win over CCD Turó de la Peira.

After just one further match, Adnane moved to UE Vilassar de Mar in 2019, being initially a member of the B-team in Tercera Catalana. After scoring 13 goals in his first year, he first started to play with the latter's main squad in October 2020, in Tercera División, but was mainly used in the B's during the 2021–22 campaign, in Segona Catalana.

In November 2022, Adnane signed for CE Europa to become a member of their B-side in Primera Catalana. He also featured with the first team in Tercera Federación on six occasions during the season, scoring once and helping the club to achieve promotion to Segunda Federación. In July 2023, he also played in the Kings League for Los Troncos FC.

On 18 January 2024, after establishing himself as a regular starter for Europa B in Lliga Elit, Adnane was definitely promoted to the main squad. He was regularly used during the 2024–25 campaign, scoring ten goals as the club achieved promotion to Primera Federación.

Adnane subsequently established himself as an undisputed first-choice for the Escapulats, attracting interest from Segunda División sides CD Castellón and SD Huesca. On 18 June 2026, he moved to Córdoba CF in that division on a two-year contract.

Adnane made his professional debut on 16 August 2026, coming on as a late substitute for Eder García in a 3–2 away loss to Burgos CF.
