= 304 (disambiguation) =

304 may refer to:

- The year 304 or the year 304 BC.
- Area code 304, in West Virginia
- 304 (number), the natural number
- 304 (card game), a card game popular in Sri Lanka and Tamil Nadu
- 304 Olga, a main-belt asteroid
- Peugeot 304, a small family car
- SAE 304 stainless steel, the most common type of stainless steel,
- HTTP 304
- 304, a fictional class battlecruiser in the Stargate series.
- 0304 (with intentional leading zero), an album by Jewel
- "304 woman," a slang term meaning a promiscuous woman. When 304 is typed into a hand-held calculator then turned upside down, the symbols resemble the word "hoe", which is an American term for a whore.
- Rocafonda, a neighbourhood in Mataró with the postcode 08304 . Footballer Lamine Yamal celebrates goals by gesturing the number 304 to recognise the neighbourhood.
