= Laureus World Sports Award for Young Sportsperson of the Year =

Annual sports award

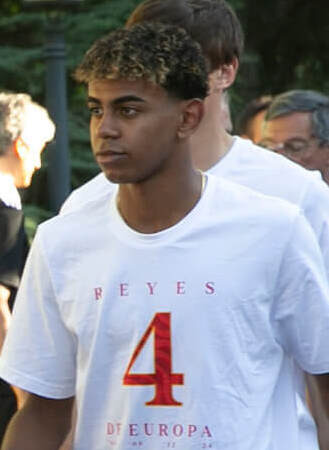
- Lamine Yamal, 2026 winner
- Awarded for: "best young athlete under the age of 21."
- Location: Madrid (2026)
- Presented by: Laureus Sport for Good Foundation
- First award: 2026
- Currently held by: (Spain) Lamine Yamal (2026)
- Website: Official website

The Laureus World Sports Award for Young Sportsperson of the Year is an annual award awarded to the best young athlete under the age of 21 in the world of sports. First presented in 2026, it is one in the newest addition within the Laureus World Sports Awards. The awards are presented by the Laureus Sport for Good Foundation, a global organization involved in over 150 charity projects supporting 500,000 young people. The inaugural ceremony of the award took place on 20 April 2026 in the Palacio de Cibeles in Madrid. As of 2020, a shortlist of six nominees for the award comes from a panel composed of the "world's leading sports editors, writers and broadcasters". The Laureus World Sports Academy then selects the individual winner or winning team who is presented with a Laureus statuette, created by Cartier, at an annual awards ceremony held in various locations around the world. The awards are considered highly prestigious and are frequently referred to as the sporting equivalent of "Oscars".

The inaugural winner of the award was the Spanish footballer Lamine Yamal. This makes the teenager the youngest athlete to have won two Laureus awards after taking the Breakthrough Prize in 2025.

== Recipients ==
Laureus World Sports Award for Young Sportsperson of the Year Recipients
Year	Image	Winner	Nationality	Sport	Ref(s)
2026	Lamine Yamal	Lamine Yamal	ESP	Football	
