= 2007 Messi–Yamal photo shoot =

Charity photography session in Barcelona

20-year-old Lionel Messi bathing five-month-old Lamine Yamal

In December 2007, 20-year-old Argentine footballer Lionel Messi posed for a charity photo shoot with five-month-old Lamine Yamal as part of a collaboration between Sport, a Catalan sports newspaper, FC Barcelona, and UNICEF to produce a fundraising calendar. Messi, then a rising star at Barcelona, was paired with Yamal by coincidence following a raffle won by Yamal's parents. The photographs remained largely obscure until July 2024, when Yamal's father shared them on social media ahead of a UEFA Euro 2024 match where Yamal played, at which point they gained widespread attention for the coincidence they depicted.

The images capture Messi, then at the start of what would become one of the greatest careers in football history, bathing Yamal, who would later emerge as one of the sport's most prominent young players. The images attracted renewed attention in July 2026 ahead of the 2026 FIFA World Cup final between Argentina and Spain, in which Yamal, by then 19 years old and a rising football star, faced Messi, aged 39, who was approaching the end of his accomplished career.

== Background ==
Lionel Messi is an Argentine footballer and former FC Barcelona player widely regarded as one of the greatest of all time. In December 2007, when the photograph was taken, Messi was a 20-year-old rising star at the club, having joined the senior team three years earlier and already won two La Liga titles and a Champions League title. Lamine Yamal is a Spanish footballer who started playing in Barcelona in 2023, two years after Messi left the club. Yamal is widely regarded as one of the best players in the world. At the time of the photograph, he was five months old.

The photo shoot originated as part of a humanitarian collaboration between Sport, a Catalan sports newspaper, FC Barcelona, and UNICEF to produce a fundraising calendar, a partnership the three organizations had maintained since 2004. The concept was conceived by former Sport director Josep Maria Casanovas and organized by marketing employee Oriol Canals Vaquer and fellow journalist Joan Vehils, with Barcelona selecting the participating players and UNICEF organizing the raffle to determine the winning families. According to Sport, the early editions of the calendar were poorly coordinated, though organization improved in later years, including the 2008 edition.

For that edition, UNICEF organized a community raffle in the Rocafonda neighborhood of Mataró, Catalonia, to select participating children from the Greater Barcelona area, with no formal marketing strategy or long-term promotional vision in place. Yamal's parents, Mounir Nasraoui and Sheila Ebana, entered him into the raffle, winning a place in the shoot alongside a member of the FC Barcelona first team.

== Photo shoot ==
The session was captured by freelance photojournalist Joan Monfort inside the visitors' dressing room at the Camp Nou in December 2007, with Yamal paired alongside Messi entirely by chance. The concept was conceived by Monfort the night before while bathing his own daughter Jana, prompting him to bring a small plastic tub and a rubber duck to the session. The photographs include images of Messi bathing Yamal alone in the tub, another of Yamal's mother assisting Messi in the same setting, and a further shot of Messi cradling the infant in a towel, with the rubber duck used to engage Yamal during the session.

Monfort noted that shoots of this nature presented distinct challenges, as the players were often in a rush, unfamiliar with the families, and capturing candid images required all parties to feel at ease. Messi arrived from the dressing room to the set notably introverted and uncomfortable handling a baby, initially unsure of how to hold him. Yamal's mother played a key role in keeping the infant comfortable during the session. Initially there was little interaction between Messi and Yamal, though Messi adapted quickly and Monfort noted that he remained professional throughout. Following the session, Monfort provided Yamal's parents with copies of the photographs, noting that the family had travelled approximately 40 km (25 mi) and arrived early, visibly excited about the shoot.

The 2008 UNICEF calendar featured players from the FC Barcelona squad managed by Frank Rijkaard, with each month dedicated to a different player paired with a family. Messi's photographs appeared in the January edition, with other months featuring Ronaldinho, Thierry Henry, Carles Puyol, Xavi Hernández, Andrés Iniesta, Samuel Eto'o, Víctor Valdés, Deco, Bojan Krkić, Giovani dos Santos, Rafael Márquez, Yaya Touré, Eric Abidal, Lilian Thuram, and Sylvinho, each with different photo shoot set ups and themes. The players had no prior connection to the families they were paired with, and the photographs were archived following publication. Fifty percent of sales proceeds were directed toward funding UNICEF projects for children's rights. The rubber duck used in the photo shoot has since been lost.

"Back then, nobody could imagine that this baby would be who he is now — and you could not have known that Messi would become who he became, either," Monfort said.

== Reception ==
The photograph remained largely obscure until July 2024, having gone unremembered by Sport, Messi, Barcelona, and Monfort, though Yamal's father Nasraoui had retained knowledge of it. During the UEFA Euro 2024 quarterfinal between Spain and Germany, Nasraoui shared one of the images on Instagram with the caption El comienzo de dos leyendas (lit. 'The beginning of two legends'), which immediately went viral. Yamal went on to help Spain claim the European title that tournament. Due to the coincidental nature of the images, some initially suspected they had been generated with artificial intelligence before archival verification confirmed their authenticity.

Monfort expressed surprise at the renewed attention, having completely forgotten about the photoshoot until a colleague from Sport alerted him to the images trending online and asked whether they were his, which he confirmed. He noted that following the viral spread of the photographs, he was inundated with inquiries from media outlets and received no additional compensation for their reproduction. Monfort described the photographs as the most personally rewarding work of his photography career.

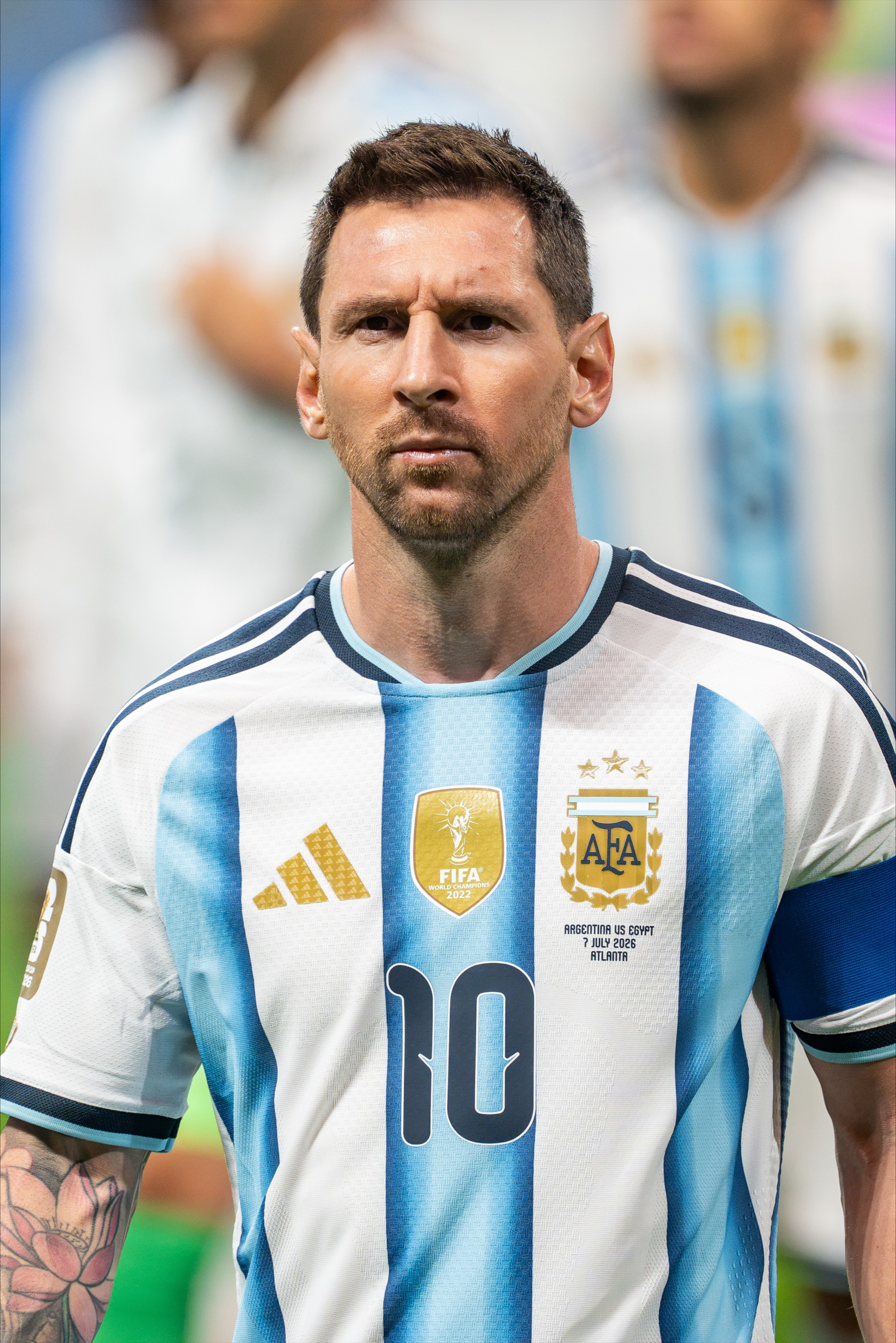
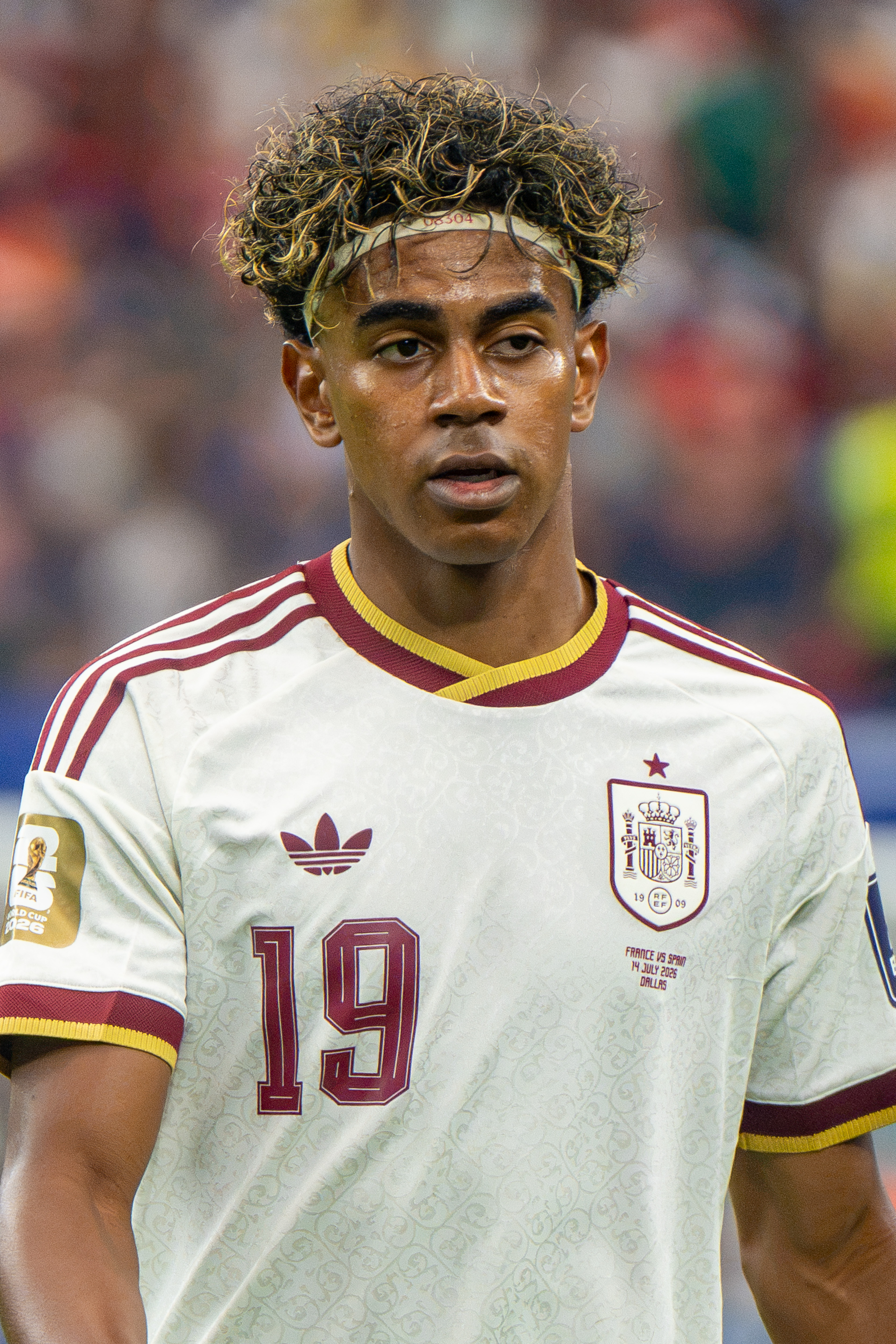
Messi (left) and Yamal (right) at the 2026 FIFA World Cup. The two went on to face each other in the final, representing Argentina and Spain, respectively.

After the images resurfaced, Yamal spoke to the press, stating that he had been aware of them but had decided with his father not to make them public earlier to avoid comparisons with Messi. In a July 2024 interview, Yamal said he had not yet spoken to Messi about the photographs but wished to do so. When asked whether such comparisons bothered him, Yamal said he did not mind being compared to Messi but acknowledged that the accomplishments Messi had set as a player would be difficult to reach. When a reporter suggested the photograph looked like a blessing from Messi, Yamal's father joked, "Maybe it was Lamine who blessed Leo!", adding that the odds of the two being photographed together at such early stages of their respective lives were remarkable. That month, Barcelona described the photographs as among the "most iconic football pictures ever taken".

The photographs attracted a second wave of international media coverage in July 2026 ahead of the 2026 FIFA World Cup final between Spain and Argentina, where Messi and Yamal would meet on the pitch for the first time. (Note: Messi and Yamal were expected to meet earlier in March 2026 during the 2026 Finalissima, but the match was cancelled.) During a joint pre-match panel in New York on 17 July alongside American football player Tom Brady, Messi addressed the coincidence publicly, stating: "Honestly, that photo of us is crazy, because — well, that's life, right? I took a photo with him as a baby, and here we both are, facing off in a World Cup". Messi described Yamal as one of the best players in the world and noted that he followed his career closely given his connection to Barcelona, where Messi spent much of his career, and a club he holds in high regard. He also acknowledged that the World Cup final represented a historic moment in Yamal's career.

FIFA and several media outlets described the images as "prophetic", with some characterizing it as a symbolic "baptism" in which one of the sport's greatest players (Messi) unknowingly "anointed" a future star (Yamal) as his "heir". Comparisons between Messi and Yamal have been drawn since Yamal made his debut for Barcelona in 2023, since when he has won multiple La Liga titles, a UEFA European Championship, and the FIFA World Cup. When the two met in the 2026 FIFA World Cup final, won by Spain 1–0 over Argentina, the encounter was widely described as a "full circle" moment symbolic of a generational transition in football, with Messi (aged 39) approaching the end of an illustrious career and Yamal (aged 19), regarded as one of the sport's most promising talents, at the start of his.

== In popular culture ==
On 21 July 2026, American trading card manufacturer Topps announced it would feature the 2007 photograph in an upcoming card release. The card is scheduled to be included in the Topps Stadium Club UEFA Club Competitions set as a one-of-one (1/1) card, meaning that only that particular version of the card will be produced and randomly inserted into packs for sale.

Following Spain's 1–0 win against Argentina in the 2026 World Cup final, various AI-generated images and videos circulated on social platforms parodying the photo, typically depicting a role reversal with Yamal depicted washing a baby Messi. The Indian and South African Instagram pages of fast food brands Wendy's and KFC respectively also joined in the trend, the former posting an AI image depicting both footballers as anthropomorphic goats (a visual double entendre referring to both players as GOATs) and the latter depicting Colonel Sanders, the founder and mascot of KFC, bathing a baby Ronald McDonald.
