= Laureus World Sports Awards =

Annual award ceremony honouring individuals and teams from the world of sports

- Cartier statuette presented to each winner
- Awarded for: Men and women from the world of sport along with their achievements from the previous calendar year
- Presented by: Laureus Sport for Good Foundation
- Most awards: (Switzerland) Roger Federer and (Serbia) Novak Djokovic (5)
- Most nominations: (United States) Tiger Woods (12)
- Website: Official website

The Laureus World Sports Awards is an annual award ceremony honouring individuals and teams from the world of sports along with sporting achievements throughout the year. It was established in 1999 by Laureus Sport for Good Foundation founding patrons Daimler and Richemont. It is supported by its global partners Mercedes-Benz, IWC Schaffhausen and Mitsubishi UFJ Financial Group. The name "Laureus" is derived from the Greek word for laurel, considered a traditional symbol of victory in athletics.

The first ceremony was held on 25 May 2000 in Monte Carlo, at which South African president Nelson Mandela gave the keynote speech. As of 2020, awards are made annually in eight categories, with a number of discretionary categories irregularly recognised. The recipient of each award is presented with a Laureus statuette, created by Cartier, at an annual ceremony held in various locations around the world. As of 2020, the ceremonies have been held in eleven cities, and are broadcast in at least 160 countries.

Swiss tennis player Roger Federer holds the record for the most awards with six, five for Sportsman of the Year and one for Comeback of the Year. American tennis player Serena Williams and American artistic gymnast Simone Biles holds the record for most awards held by a female with five, four for Sportswoman of the Year and one for Comeback of the Year. Novak Djokovic won the 2024 Sports Man of the year award and grabbed his 5th title, making him the most decorated sportsman in the History of the Award along with Roger Federer. A number of awards have been rescinded, namely those presented to American cyclist Lance Armstrong, American sprinter Marion Jones and Canadian amputee sprinter Earle Connor, each of whom were subsequently found to have illegally used drugs to achieve their records. In the 2020 ceremony, Argentine footballer Lionel Messi became the first footballer to win the Laureus World Sportsman of the Year award. He is also the first and only athlete to win it coming from a team sport. Moreover, in 2023, Messi once again won it and became the only sportsperson as well as footballer to ever win the award twice from a team sport.

== History ==
Sport has the power to change the world. It has the power to inspire. It has the power to unite people in a way that little else does. It speaks to youth in a language they understand. Sport can create hope, where once there was only despair.

— Nelson Mandela, 2000

The organisation, established in 1998 to do charity by a partnership of Richemont and Daimler became known as "Laureus", its name being derived from the Greek word for laurel, considered a traditional symbol of victory in athletics. The first Laureus World Sports Awards ceremony was held two years later, at which the patron and president of South Africa, Nelson Mandela, delivered a speech which Edwin Moses has described as "iconic".

Awards were made in seven regular categories and two discretionary categories at the inaugural ceremony, hosted by the American actors Jeff Bridges and Dylan McDermott. Two of those awards would later be rescinded: both the American cyclist Lance Armstrong and the American track athlete Marion Jones were found to have used performance-enhancing drugs and had their awards withdrawn. The award for American amputee sprinter Earle Connor, who won the 2004 Laureus World Sportsperson of the Year with a Disability Award, was also later rescinded.

The awards are frequently referred to as the sporting equivalent of an "Oscar" for movies.

== Categories ==
The Laureus Nominations Panel, composed of more than 1,000 members of sports media from more than 70 countries, vote to create a shortlist of nominations in six categories:

- Laureus World Sportsman of the Year
- Laureus World Sportswoman of the Year
- Laureus World Team of the Year
- Laureus World Comeback of the Year
- Laureus World Breakthrough of the Year
- Laureus Action Sportsperson of the Year

The nominees of the Laureus World Sportsperson of the Year with a Disability are chosen by the International Paralympic Committee.

The Laureus World Sports Academy is an association of 68 retired sportspeople who volunteer to support the work of the Laureus Sport for Good Foundation. They also vote each year to decide the winners of the Laureus World Sports Awards. As of 2020, the chairman of the Academy is Sean Fitzpatrick, former rugby player from New Zealand. The members of the Academy vote by secret ballot to select the winners.

The public votes to select the winner for one category, the Laureus Best Sporting Moment of the Year.

The Academy also makes discretionary awards, including:

- Lifetime Achievement Award
- Sport for Good Award
- Spirit of Sport Award
- Exceptional Achievement Award
- Sporting Inspiration Award
- Young Sportsperson of the Year

== Ceremony ==
The Laureus World Sports Awards ceremony is held annually at various venues in various locations around the world. The inaugural ceremony took place at the Sporting Club in Monaco on 25 May 2000. As of 2020, the ceremonies have been held in eleven cities around the world, and are broadcast in at least 160 countries. Each Laureus World Sports Award winner receives a Cartier Laureus statuette which features a "representation of the striving human form". The award weighs approximately 2.5 kilograms (5.5 lb) (with 670 grams (24 oz) of solid silver and a 650-gram (23 oz) gold-finish base) and is 30 centimetres (12 in) tall.

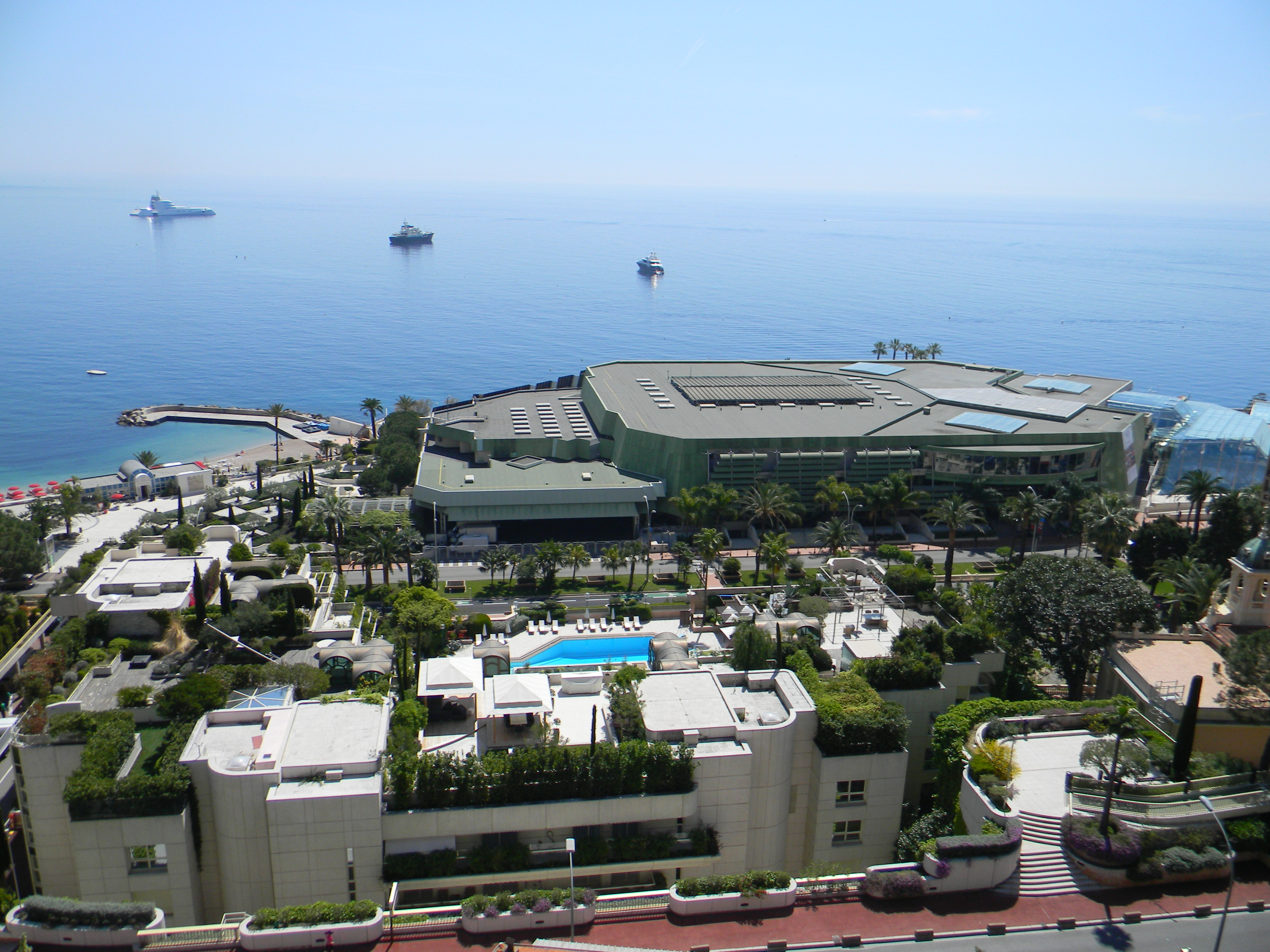
The ceremony has been held at the Grimaldi Forum in Monaco on three occasions.

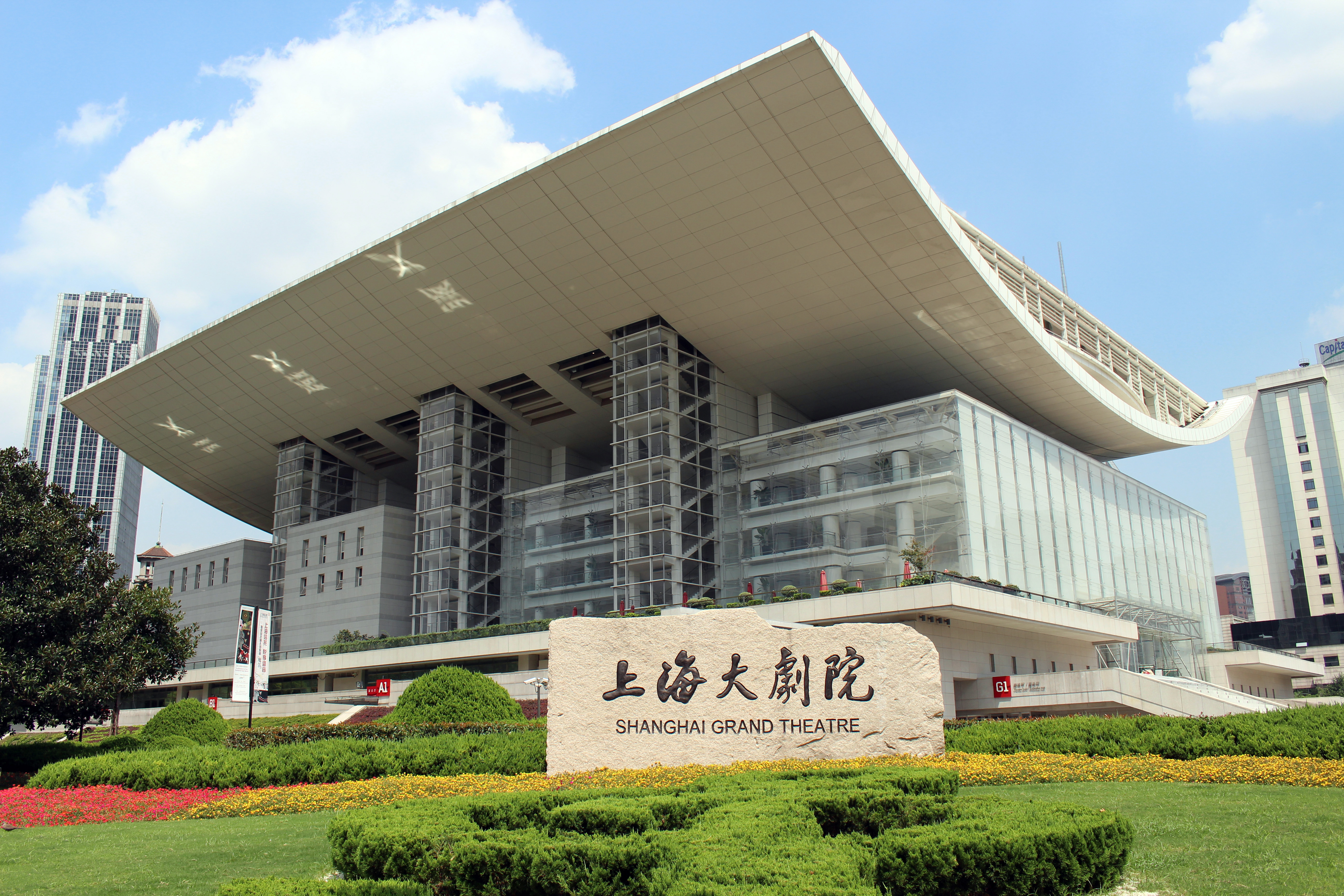
The 2015 ceremony took place at the Shanghai Grand Theatre, China.

Locations of Laureus World Sports Awards ceremonies
Year	Location	Venue	Notes	Ref(s)
2000	Monaco	Sporting Club	Patron was Nelson Mandela	
2001	Monaco	Grimaldi Forum	Patron was Prince Albert	
2002	Monaco	Grimaldi Forum		
2003	Monaco	Grimaldi Forum		
2004	Lisbon, Portugal	Cultural Centre of Belém	Patron was José Manuel Barroso	
2005	Estoril, Portugal	Casino Estoril		
2006	Barcelona, Spain	Parc del Fòrum		
2007	Barcelona, Spain	Palau Sant Jordi	Patron was Juan Carlos I of Spain	
2008	Saint Petersburg, Russia	Mariinsky Theatre	Attended by President Vladimir Putin	
2009	Ceremony cancelled due to world economic crisis; awards presented to winners individually at other events from May to June.			
2010	Abu Dhabi, United Arab Emirates	Emirates Palace		
2011	Abu Dhabi, United Arab Emirates	Emirates Palace		
2012	London, United Kingdom	Central Hall Westminster		
2013	Rio de Janeiro, Brazil	Theatro Municipal		
2014	Kuala Lumpur, Malaysia	Istana Budaya		
2015	Shanghai, China	Shanghai Grand Theatre		
2016	Berlin, Germany	Palais am Funkturm		
2017	Monaco	Sporting Club		
2018	Monaco	Sporting Club		
2019	Monaco	Sporting Club		
2020	Berlin, Germany	Verti Halle	Twentieth anniversary of awards	
2021	Seville, Spain	Online	Virtual ceremony	
2022	Seville, Spain	Online	Virtual ceremony	
2023	Paris, France	Pavillon Vendome		
2024	Madrid, Spain	Palacio de Cibeles		
2025	Madrid, Spain	Palacio de Cibeles	Twenty-fifth anniversary of awards	
2026	Madrid, Spain	Palacio de Cibeles		

== Winners by category ==
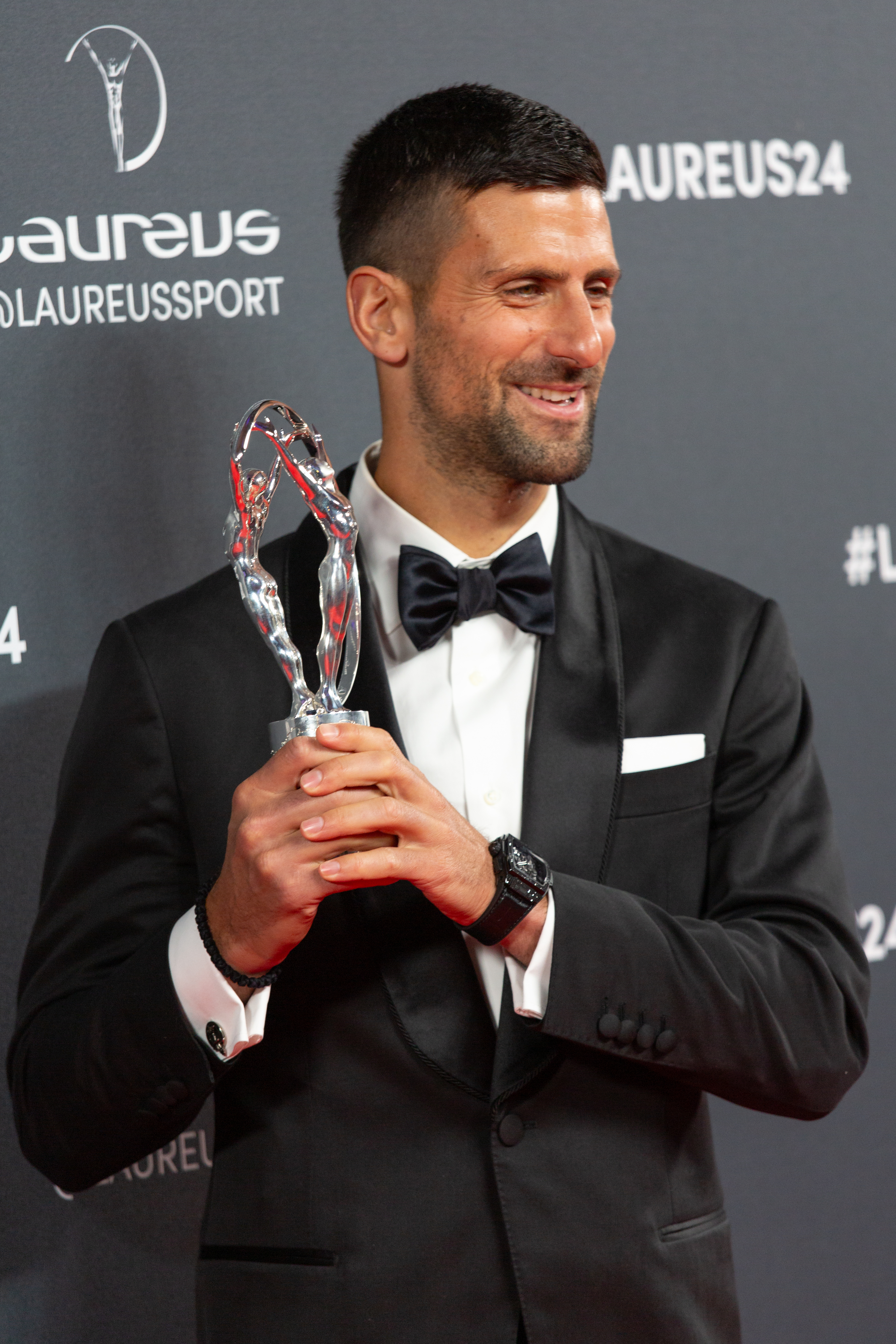
Novak Djokovic (five) shares the record with Roger Federer for Sportsmen of the Year awards.

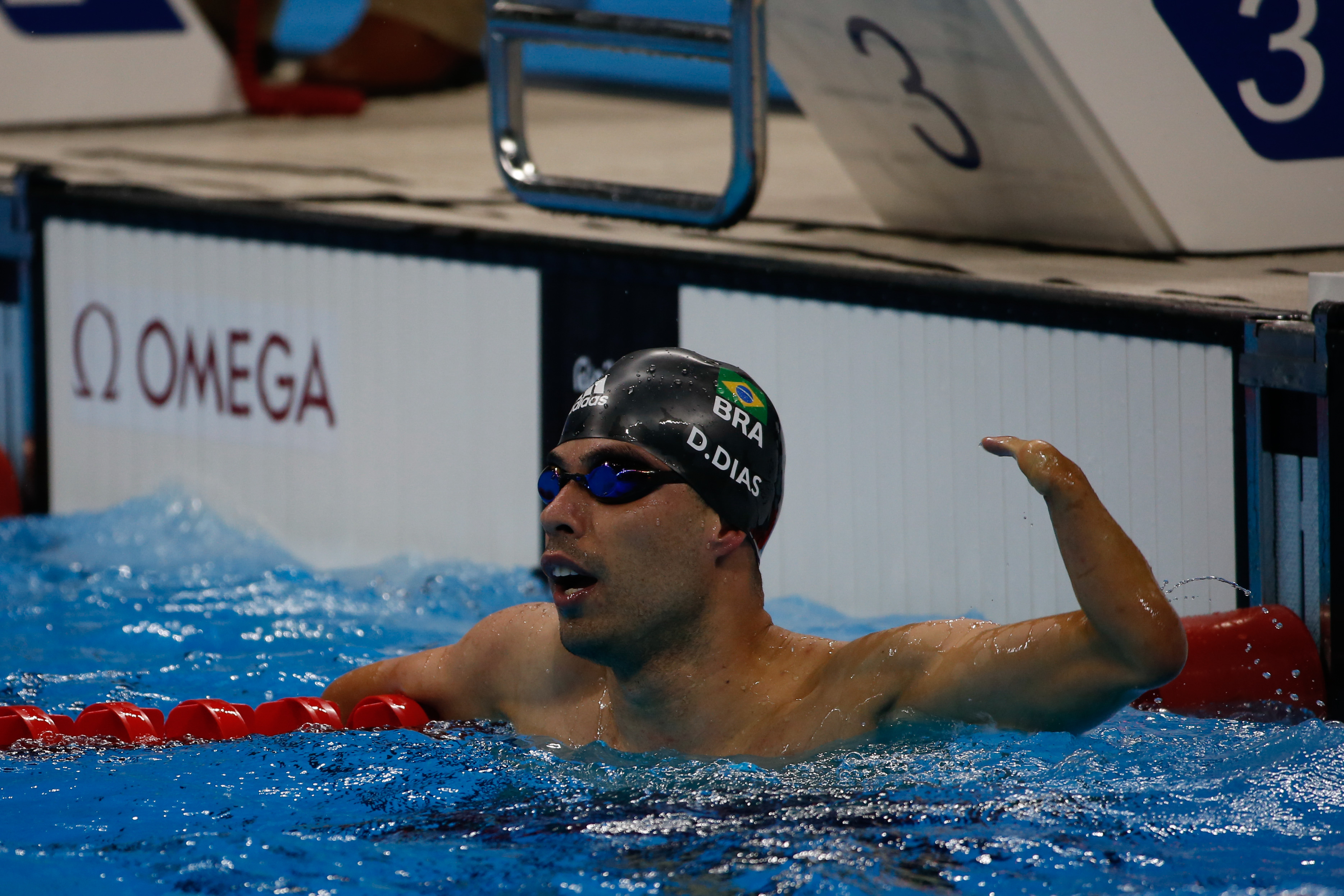
Daniel Dias has won the Sportsperson with a Disability of the Year Award three times.

=== Regular awards ===
==== Breakthrough of the Year ====
Prior to 2007, this award was called Newcomer of the Year.

==== Action Sportsperson of the Year ====
Prior to 2007, this award was called Alternative Sportsperson of the Year.

==== Best Sporting Moment ====
The Best Sporting Moment Award, inaugurated in 2017, and voted for by the public, was won by the FC Barcelona under-12 (Infantil-B) side for their sportsmanship in consoling a defeated opposition team. The 2018 award was won by fans of the Iowa Hawkeyes football team, who at the end of the first quarter of each home game turn toward the children's hospital that overlooks the playing field and wave to patients watching the game. For the 2020 ceremony, the Best Sporting Moment was drawn from the previous two decades and voted for by the general public. Referred to as the "Laureus Sporting Moment Award (2000–2020)", it was won by Indian cricketer Sachin Tendulkar. In 2021, Chris Nikic was presented with the Best Sporting Moment award.

=== Discretionary awards ===
Since 2000, the Laureus World Sports Awards have included a number of accolades given by the Academy at their discretion. At the first ceremony in 2000, Brazilian footballer Pelé became the first recipient of the Lifetime Achievement Award, while American Eunice Kennedy Shriver, founder of the Special Olympics was presented with the inaugural Laureus Sport for Good Award. The first Spirit of Sport award was presented in 2005 to the Boston Red Sox who had won the World Series for the first time in 86 years. In 2013, American swimmer Michael Phelps became the first recipient of the Exceptional Achievement Award. As of 2018, Chinese tennis player Li Na (2015) and Italian footballer Francesco Totti (2018) are the only other people to be honoured with the award. In 2017, the Refugee Olympic Team, comprising ten athletes from Syria, Congo, Ethiopia and South Sudan, was awarded the first Sporting Inspiration Award. The following year, the award was presented to the American footballer J. J. Watt whose "exceptional humanitarian efforts" raised more than US$37 million for those impacted by Hurricane Harvey. In 2021, Lewis Hamilton was presented with the Athlete Advocate of the Year Award.

== Winners by year ==
=== Regular awards ===
Laureus World Sports Awards regular awards winners
Year	Sportsman	Sportswoman	Team	Breakthrough	Comeback	Disability	Action	Moment	Ref.
2000	Tiger Woods	Marion Jones*	Manchester United	Sergio García	Lance Armstrong*	Louise Sauvage	Shaun Palmer	—N/a	
2001	Tiger Woods (2)	Cathy Freeman	France national football team	Marat Safin	Jennifer Capriati	Vinny Lauwers	Mike Horn	—N/a	
2002	Michael Schumacher	Jennifer Capriati	Australia national cricket team	Juan Pablo Montoya	Goran Ivanišević	Esther Vergeer	Bob Burnquist	—N/a	
2003	Lance Armstrong*	Serena Williams	Brazil national football team	Yao Ming	Ronaldo	Michael Milton	Dean Potter	—N/a	
2004	Michael Schumacher (2)	Annika Sörenstam	England national rugby union team	Michelle Wie	Hermann Maier	Earle Connor*	Layne Beachley	—N/a	
2005	Roger Federer	Kelly Holmes	Greece national football team	Liu Xiang	Alex Zanardi	Chantal Petitclerc	Ellen MacArthur	—N/a	
2006	Roger Federer	Janica Kostelić	Renault F1 team	Rafael Nadal	Martina Hingis	Ernst van Dyk	Angelo d'Arrigo	—N/a	
2007	Roger Federer	Yelena Isinbayeva	Italy national football team	Amélie Mauresmo	Serena Williams	Martin Braxenthaler	Kelly Slater	—N/a	
2008	Roger Federer	Justine Henin	South Africa national rugby union team	Lewis Hamilton	Paula Radcliffe	Esther Vergeer	Shaun White	—N/a	
2009	Usain Bolt	Yelena Isinbayeva (2)	China Olympic team	Rebecca Adlington	Vitali Klitschko	Daniel Dias	Kelly Slater	—N/a	
2010	Usain Bolt	Serena Williams	Brawn F1 team	Jenson Button	Kim Clijsters	Natalie du Toit	Stephanie Gilmore	—N/a	
2011	Rafael Nadal	Lindsey Vonn	Spain national football team	Martin Kaymer	Valentino Rossi	Verena Bentele	Kelly Slater	—N/a	
2012	Novak Djokovic	Vivian Cheruiyot	FC Barcelona	Rory McIlroy	Darren Clarke	Oscar Pistorius	Kelly Slater	—N/a	
2013	Usain Bolt	Jessica Ennis	Europe Ryder Cup team	Andy Murray	Félix Sánchez	Daniel Dias	Felix Baumgartner	—N/a	
2014	Sebastian Vettel	Missy Franklin	Bayern Munich	Marc Márquez	Rafael Nadal	Marie Bochet	Jamie Bestwick	—N/a	
2015	Novak Djokovic	Genzebe Dibaba	Germany national football team	Daniel Ricciardo	Schalk Burger	Tatyana McFadden	Alan Eustace	—N/a	
2016	Novak Djokovic	Serena Williams	New Zealand national rugby union team	Jordan Spieth	Dan Carter	Daniel Dias	Jan Frodeno	—N/a	
2017	Usain Bolt (4)	Simone Biles	Chicago Cubs	Nico Rosberg	Michael Phelps	Beatrice Vio	Rachel Atherton	FC Barcelona under-12s	
2018	Roger Federer (5)	Serena Williams (4)	Mercedes F1 Team	Sergio García	Roger Federer	Marcel Hug	Armel Le Cléac'h	Chapecoense	
2019	Novak Djokovic	Simone Biles	France national football team	Naomi Osaka	Tiger Woods	Henrieta Farkašová	Chloe Kim	Xia Boyu	
2020	Lewis Hamilton & Lionel Messi	Simone Biles	South Africa national rugby union team	Egan Bernal	Sophia Flörsch	Oksana Masters	Chloe Kim	Sachin Tendulkar	
2021	Rafael Nadal (2)	Naomi Osaka	Bayern Munich	Patrick Mahomes	Maxence Parrot	—N/a	—N/a	Chris Nikic	
2022	Max Verstappen	Elaine Thompson-Herah	Italy national football team	Emma Raducanu	Sky Brown	Marcel Hug	Bethany Shriever	—N/a	
2023	Lionel Messi (2)	Shelly-Ann Fraser-Pryce	Argentina national football team	Carlos Alcaraz	Christian Eriksen	Catherine Debrunner	Eileen Gu	—N/a	
2024	Novak Djokovic (5)	Aitana Bonmatí	Spain women's national football team	Jude Bellingham	Simone Biles	Diede de Groot	Arisa Trew	—N/a	
2025	Armand Duplantis	Simone Biles (4)	Real Madrid	Lamine Yamal	Rebeca Andrade	Jiang Yuyan	Tom Pidcock	—N/a	
2026	Carlos Alcaraz	Aryna Sabalenka	Paris Saint-Germain	Lando Norris	Rory McIlroy	Gabriel Araújo	Chloe Kim (3)	—N/a	

Key
*	Indicates individual whose award or nomination was later rescinded
—N/a	Not awarded

=== Discretionary awards ===
Laureus World Sports Awards discretionary awards recipients
Year	Lifetime	Sport for Good	Spirit of Sport	Exceptional Achievement	Sporting Inspiration	Athlete Advocate	Sporting Icon Award	Sport for good society	Young Sportsperson of the Year	Ref.
2000	Pelé	Eunice Kennedy Shriver	—N/a	—N/a	—N/a	—N/a	—N/a	—N/a	—N/a	
2001	Steve Redgrave	Kip Keino	—N/a	—N/a	—N/a	—N/a	—N/a	—N/a	—N/a	
	Peter Blake †	Peter Blake †	—N/a	—N/a	—N/a	—N/a	—N/a	—N/a	—N/a	
2003	Gary Player	Arnold Schwarzenegger	—N/a	—N/a	—N/a	—N/a	—N/a	—N/a	—N/a	
2004	Arne Næss Jr. †	Mathare Youth Sports Association	—N/a	—N/a	—N/a	—N/a	—N/a	—N/a	—N/a	
2004	Arne Næss Jr. †	India national cricket team Pakistan national cricket team	—N/a	—N/a	—N/a	—N/a	—N/a	—N/a	—N/a	
2005	—N/a	Gerry Storey	Boston Red Sox	—N/a	—N/a	—N/a	—N/a	—N/a	—N/a	
2006	Johan Cruyff	Jürgen Griesbeck	Valentino Rossi	—N/a	—N/a	—N/a	—N/a	—N/a	—N/a	
2007	Franz Beckenbauer	Luke Dowdney	FC Barcelona	—N/a	—N/a	—N/a	—N/a	—N/a	—N/a	
2008	Sergey Bubka	Brendan and Sean Tuohy	Dick Pound	—N/a	—N/a	—N/a	—N/a	—N/a	—N/a	
2009	—N/a	—N/a	—N/a	—N/a	—N/a	—N/a	—N/a	—N/a	—N/a	
2010	Nawal El Moutawakel	Dikembe Mutombo	—N/a	—N/a	—N/a	—N/a	—N/a	—N/a	—N/a	
2011	Zinedine Zidane	May El-Khalil	European Ryder Cup team	—N/a	—N/a	—N/a	—N/a	—N/a	—N/a	
2012	Bobby Charlton	Raí	—N/a	—N/a	—N/a	—N/a	—N/a	—N/a	—N/a	
2013	Sebastian Coe	—N/a	—N/a	Michael Phelps	—N/a	—N/a	—N/a	—N/a	—N/a	
2014	—N/a	Magic Bus	Afghanistan national cricket team	—N/a	—N/a	—N/a	—N/a	—N/a	—N/a	
2015	—N/a	Skateistan	Yao Ming	Li Na	—N/a	—N/a	—N/a	—N/a	—N/a	
2016	Niki Lauda	Moving the Goalposts	Johan Cruyff †	—N/a	—N/a	—N/a	—N/a	—N/a	—N/a	
2017	—N/a	Waves for Change	Leicester City	—N/a	Refugee Olympic Team	—N/a	—N/a	—N/a	—N/a	
2018	Edwin Moses	Active Communities Network	—N/a	Francesco Totti	J. J. Watt	—N/a	—N/a	—N/a	—N/a	
2019	Arsène Wenger	Yuwa	Lindsey Vonn	Eliud Kipchoge	—N/a	—N/a	—N/a	—N/a	—N/a	
2020	Dirk Nowitzki	South Bronx United	—N/a	Spanish Basketball Federation	—N/a	—N/a	—N/a	—N/a	—N/a	
2021	Billie Jean King	Kickformore by Kickfair	—N/a	—N/a	Mohamed Salah	Lewis Hamilton	—N/a	—N/a	—N/a	
2022	Tom Brady	Lost Boyz Inc.	—N/a	Robert Lewandowski	—N/a	Gerald Asamoah and the Black Eagles	Valentino Rossi	Real Madrid Foundation	—N/a	
2023	—N/a	TeamUp (Robert Lewandowski)	—N/a	—N/a	—N/a	—N/a	—N/a	—N/a	—N/a	
2024	—N/a	Fundación Rafa Nadal (Rafael Nadal)	—N/a	—N/a	—N/a	—N/a	—N/a	—N/a	—N/a	
2025	Kelly Slater	Kick4Life	—N/a	—N/a	—N/a	—N/a	Rafael Nadal	—N/a	—N/a	
2026	Nadia Comăneci	Fútbol Más	—N/a	—N/a	Toni Kroos	—N/a	—N/a	—N/a	Lamine Yamal	

Key
†	Indicates posthumous award
—N/a	Not awarded

== See also ==
- Arthur Ashe Courage Award
- List of volunteer awards
