= Fode Diallo =

Spanish footballer

Personal information
- Full name: Fode Diallo Conde
- Date of birth: 6 March 2012 (age 14)
- Place of birth: Sabadell, Spain
- Position: Forward

Team information
- Current team: Barcelona

Youth career
- Years: Team
- 2014–2015: SSB PARWATHA
- 2016–2017: Sabadell
- 2017–2018: Sant Cugat FC
- 2018–: Barcelona
- ‡ National team caps and goals as of 01:49, 13 May 2025 (UTC)

Fode Diallo Conde (born 6 March 2012) is a Spanish footballer who plays as a forward for Barcelona's youth academy.

== Club career ==
Diallo was born in Sabadell, in the La Creu de Barberà neighborhood and began playing football with U.E. Sabadellenca. After one season there, he moved to Sabadell who scouted his older cousin and brother. He followed that up with one season at Sant Cugat FC. He joined the Barcelona youth academy in 2019. He achieved international attention after scoring 97 goals in 30 games as a U12 for the 2023–24 season. The following season in 2024–25 in the U13 División de Honor Juvenil de Fútbol, he scored 38 goals, 9 more than his closest competitor.

== Personal life ==
Born in Spain, Diallo is of Guinean descent. His older brother Abdou Diallo is currently a youth footballer with Mallorca, and his sister Fatu is runner-up in Spain in the U-20 high jump representing the JAS. His cousin Balla Moussa is a youth footballer with RCD Espanyol.

== Playing style ==
Diallo can play as a striker or winger. He is physically strong, quick, and an adept finisher. He has earned playstyle comparisons with Lamine Yamal and Samuel Eto'o.
