= Laureus Spirit of Sport Award =

Sports award

- Awarded for: "those individual athletes or teams who, through their remarkable success, their refusal to accept defeat or their unquestionable contribution to the enjoyment of the game"
- Location: Berlin (2020)
- Presented by: Laureus Sport for Good Foundation
- First award: 2005
- Currently held by: Not awarded
- Website: Official website

The Laureus Spirit of Sport Award is an award honouring "those individual athletes or teams who, through their remarkable success, their refusal to accept defeat or their unquestionable contribution to the enjoyment of the game". It was first awarded in 2005 as one of the discretionary awards presented during the Laureus World Sports Awards. The awards are presented by the Laureus Sport for Good Foundation, a global organisation involved in more than 150 charity projects supporting 500,000 young people. The first ceremony was held on 25 May 2000 in Monte Carlo, at which Nelson Mandela gave the keynote speech. The recipient is presented with a Laureus statuette, created by Cartier, at an annual awards ceremony held in various locations around the world. Although the Laureus Awards ceremony is held annually, the Spirit of Sport Award is not necessarily presented every time; it is one of a number of discretionary awards that can be given by the Laureus World Sports Academy. Since its establishment, no award has been made six times, in 2009, 2010, 2012, 2013, 2018 and 2020.

The inaugural winner of the Laureus Spirit of Sport Award in 2005 was the American baseball team Boston Red Sox who won their first World Series for 86 years in the 2004 Major League Baseball season. As of 2017, five teams and four individuals have received the award. One of these individuals was honoured posthumously: Dutch former footballer and coach Johan Cruyff won the accolade in 2016, having died the previous month; his award was presented to his son Jordi Cruyff by fellow Dutchman Ruud Gullit at the ceremony in Berlin. No award was made in 2020; the most recent recipient of the Laureus Spirit of Sport Award was the American alpine skier Lindsey Vonn in 2019.

== Recipients ==
Key
†	Indicates posthumous award

Laureus Spirit of Sport Award recipients
Year	Image	Winner	Nationality	Sport	Notes	Ref
2005	Boston Red Sox with George W Bush in 2005	Boston Red Sox	USA	Baseball	The Red Sox swept the St. Louis Cardinals in the 2004 World Series, capturing their first championship in 86 years.	
2006	Valentino Rossi at the British Grand Prix in 2005	Valentino Rossi	ITA	MotoGP	Rossi won his fifth straight MotoGP Championship.	
2007	FC Barcelona in 2007	FC Barcelona	ESP	Football	Agreement with UNICEF to fund support to children's AIDS-related programmes, and to display charity's name on their shirts	
2008	Dick Pound in 2010	Dick Pound	CAN	Administration	President of the World Anti-Doping Agency for eight years	
2009	No award					
2010	No award					
2011	—	European Ryder Cup Team	Europe	Golf	Europe retained the Ryder Cup over Team USA with a win in the final pairing.	
2012	No award					
2013	No award					
2014	Afghanistan national cricket team in 2010	Afghanistan national cricket team	AFG	Cricket	"In recognition of their swift rise in world cricket and their maiden qualification to the one-day World Cup"	
2015	Yao Ming in 2014	Yao Ming	CHN	Basketball	Huge increase in popularity of basketball in China as a result of his NBA career	
2016	Johan Cruyff in 2013	Johan Cruyff †	NED	Football	Posthumous award to "legendary" footballer and coach	
2017	Leicester City F.C. lifting the Premier League trophy in 2016	Leicester City F.C.	ENG	Football	Winning the Premier League by ten points despite being 5,000 to 1 outsiders	
2018	No award					
2019	Vonn in 2017	Lindsey Vonn	USA	Alpine skiing		
2020	No award					
2021	No award					
2022	No award					
2023	No award					
2024	No award					
2025	No award					
