= Opta Sports =

British sports analytics company

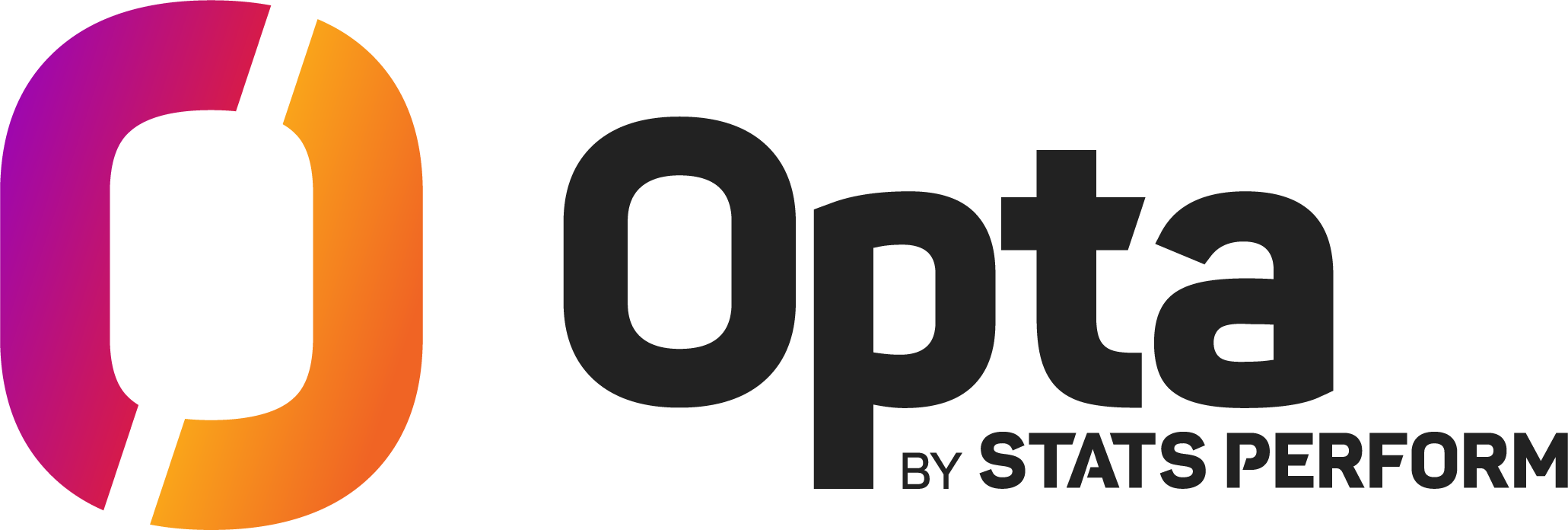
- Industry: Sports analytics
- Founded: 1996
- Headquarters: Paddington, London, United Kingdom
- Number of employees: 400+ (2012)
- Parent: Stats Perform
- Website: statsperform.com/opta

Opta Sports, formerly Opta Sportsdata and more commonly known as Opta, is a British sports analytics company. Opta provides data for more than 30 sports in over 70 countries, with clients ranging from leagues and federations to broadcasters and betting websites. The company was founded in 1996, and acquired by Perform Group in 2013. In turn, Perform Group was acquired by Vista Equity Partners in 2019, merging it with STATS LLC to form Opta's current parent company, Stats Perform.

== History ==
Opta Index Limited was founded in 1996 to analyze Premier League football matches and was contracted by Sky Sports for their television broadcasts of the 1996–97 season. The following season, Opta became the official statistics provider for the league itself and became sponsored by Carling. In June 1999, Opta was acquired by internet betting service Sports Internet Group for £3.9 million. Sky Group acquired the Sports Internet Group in 2000 and sold Opta to Sportingstatz Limited, a data service co-founded by Aidan Cooney.

Opta debuted its current real-time data collection process for football matches in 2006 and leading to an expansion in new data offerings across different sports. In 2011, the company entered the US market when it opened an office in New York and partnered with Major League Soccer.

== Offices ==
Opta is headquartered in London, with additional offices in Europe located in Limerick, Aveiro, Munich, Bassano del Grappa, Milan, Paris, Madrid and Amsterdam. The company opened offices in New York City and Sydney in 2011.

== Association football ==
WhoScored.com, which uses Opta data, generates player ratings and Team of the Season selections based on statistical performance data. In recent years, players such as Neymar, Lionel Messi and Lamine Yamal have topped its European player ratings. Unlike awards such as the Ballon d'Or, which are determined through voting, WhoScored's ratings are calculated from statistical data using its performance-rating algorithm. For example, Neymar was WhoScored's highest-rated player in Europe in 2016–17 and 2017–18, despite never winning the Ballon d'Or.
