= Disability in Spain =

Disability in Spain is characterised by an aging population, thus an increasing proportion of disabled citizens. Social services are provided by regional and municipal authorities. Several laws protect the interests of disabled people, including the UN Convention on the Rights of Persons with Disabilities which Spain signed and ratified in 2007. Disability culture features an active performing and visual arts sector which is supported by government policy and funding. Disabled sport in Spain has a long history but was boosted by the fact that the country hosted the 1992 Summer Paralympics in Barcelona and Madrid, and started a lot of policy and structural changes since the 1990s.

== Demographics ==
The progressive aging of the Spanish population, following the European guidelines of a mature society, means a higher proportion of people with disabilities. The latest study on disability was published by the National Institute of Statistics (INE) in 2008 with data from 2007.

According to INE data, a total of 608,000 people with disabilities lived alone at home. 1.39 million people were unable to perform any of the basic activities of daily living without help, and 269,000 people living in psychiatric hospitals, geriatric hospitals and nursing homes had some form of disability.

In 2021, INE plans to publish the results of a new survey on the population with disabilities, conducted during 2020.

== Social services ==
The responsibility for services and assistance to people with disabilities is in the hands of the regional governments and municipalities. In addition, there is a wide network of non-profit organizations, institutions and companies that make up the infrastructure and support network.

== Legislation ==
The laws that protect people with disabilities and establish the criteria for their care are the Dependency Law (2006) and the General Law on the Rights of People with Disabilities and their Social Inclusion (2013). Spain signed and ratified the United Nations Convention on the Rights of Persons with Disabilities in 2007.

== Culture ==
=== Arts ===
Several arts festivals featuring disabled artists are held in Spain, these are supported and funded by government in accordance with the 2011 "Culture for All" strategic plan Estrategia Integral Española de Cultura para Todos. There are also several companies that specialise in promoting and staging drama, dance and visual arts by artists with disabilities.

=== Sport ===
Disabled sports in Spain started in the 1910s with the emergence of deaf sport. Blind sport began in the 1930s. Sport for people with physical disabilities began in the 1950s, and was primarily rehabilitative. The first major organization for disabled sports was created in 1968 at the direction of then president of the Spanish Olympic Committee Juan Antonio Samaranch. Spain competed at its first Paralympic Games that same year. ONCE became the official organization for organizing Spanish representation in international blind sport competitions in 1986. Spanish sport was restructured because of changes in law during the early 1990s, resulting in the creation of four new disability sport organizations and the Spanish Paralympic Committee. During the 1990s and 2000s, funding opportunities for disabled sports improved.
