= Laureus World Sports Award for Breakthrough of the Year =

Annual sports award

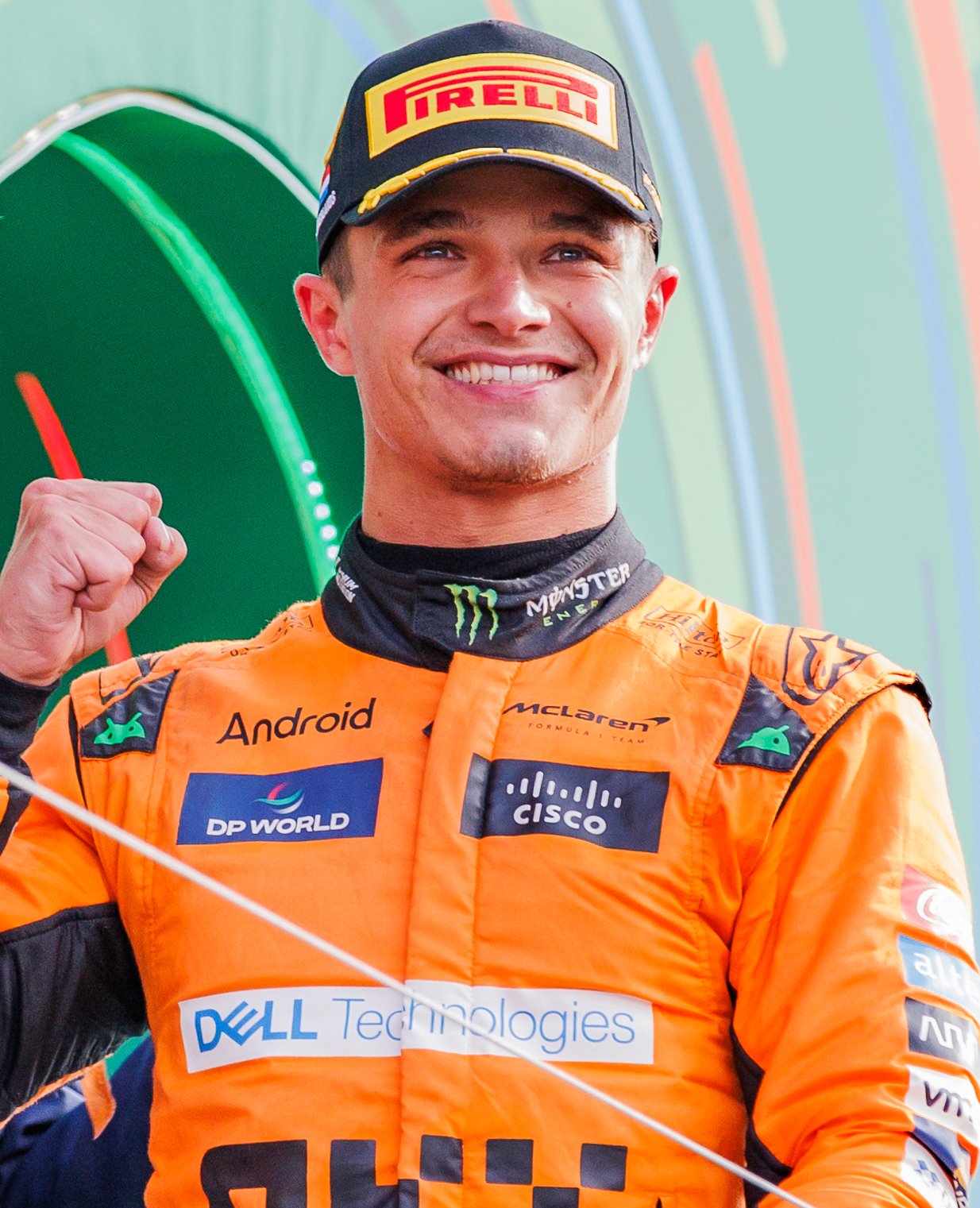
- Lando Norris, 2026 winner
- Awarded for: "Awarded to the sportsperson or team whose performance as a newcomer suggests the greatest potential for an outstanding career or to an established sportsman or sportswoman who produces a significant step-up in class to a considerably higher level of sporting achievement."
- Location: Madrid (2026)
- Presented by: Laureus Sport for Good Foundation
- First award: 2000
- Currently held by: (United Kingdom) Lando Norris (2026)
- Website: Official website

The Laureus World Sports Award for Breakthrough of the Year (previously known as the Laureus World Sports Award for Newcomer of the Year until 2007) is an annual award honoring the achievements of individuals or teams who deliver breakthrough performances in the world of sports. First presented in 2000, it is one of seven constituent awards within the Laureus World Sports Awards. The awards are presented by the Laureus Sport for Good Foundation, a global organization involved in over 150 charity projects supporting 500,000 young people. The inaugural ceremony took place on 25 May 2000 in Monte Carlo, where Nelson Mandela delivered the keynote address. As of 2020, a shortlist of six nominees for the award comes from a panel composed of the "world's leading sports editors, writers and broadcasters". The Laureus World Sports Academy then selects the individual winner or winning team who is presented with a Laureus statuette, created by Cartier, at an annual awards ceremony held in various locations around the world. The awards are considered highly prestigious and are frequently referred to as the sporting equivalent of "Oscars".

The inaugural winner of the award was the Spanish golfer Sergio García. During his debut season as a professional, the 19-year-old finished one stroke behind Tiger Woods at the 1999 PGA Championship and became the youngest player to gain selection for Team Europe for the Ryder Cup. In 2018 he also became the first and, As of 2020, only person to win the award twice, after winning his first major golf tournament (The Masters) at the age of 37. Altogether, the award has been won by five women and eighteen men, although several teams have also been nominated. British sportspeople have won more awards than any other nationality with six, followed by Spanish with five. Tennis players are the most successful overall with seven wins, followed by golfers with six. The winner in 2017 was the German Formula One driver Nico Rosberg. Having beaten teammate Lewis Hamilton to the 2016 World Championship title by five points, Rosberg announced his retirement from the sport five days later, two months prior to collecting his Laureus statuette. The 2026 winner of the award was the British racing driver Lando Norris.

== List of winners and nominees ==
Laureus World Sports Award for Breakthrough of the Year winners and nominees
Year	Image	Winner	Nationality	Sport	Nominees	Refs
2000	Sergio García in 2004	Sergio García	ESP	Golf	Kurt Warner (USA) – American football Serena Williams (USA) – tennis	
2001	Marat Safin in 2006	Marat Safin	RUS	Tennis	Aaron Baddeley (AUS) – golf Jenson Button (GBR) – Formula One; Juan Carlos Ferrero (ESP) – tennis Brett Lee (AUS) – cricket	
2002	Juan Pablo Montoya in 2002	Juan Pablo Montoya	COL	Formula One	Kim Clijsters (BEL) – tennis Steven Gerrard (ENG) – football Justine Henin (BEL) – tennis Andy Roddick (USA) – tennis	
2003	Yao Ming in 2006	Yao Ming	CHN	Basketball	Daniela Hantuchová (SVK) – tennis David Nalbandian (ARG) – tennis Wayne Rooney (ENG) – football Jochem Uytdehaage (NED) – speed skating	
2004	Michelle Wie in 2007	Michelle Wie	USA	Golf	Fernando Alonso (ESP) – Formula One; Ben Curtis (USA) – golf LeBron James (USA) – basketball Robinho (BRA) – football Maria Sharapova (RUS) – tennis	
2005	Liu Xiang in 2004	Liu Xiang	CHN	Athletics	Amir Khan (GBR) – boxing Svetlana Kuznetsova (RUS) – tennis Laure Manaudou (FRA) – swimming Dani Pedrosa (ESP) – MotoGP; Xing Huina (CHN) – athletics	
2006	Rafael Nadal in 2006	Rafael Nadal	ESP	Tennis	Paula Creamer (USA) – golf Lionel Messi (ARG) – football Andy Murray (GBR) – tennis Danica Patrick (USA) – auto racing Ben Roethlisberger (USA) – American football	
2007	Amélie Mauresmo in 2007	Amélie Mauresmo	FRA	Tennis	Xavier Carter (USA) – athletics Ghana men's national football team (GHA) – football Lewis Hamilton (GBR) – Formula One; Britta Steffen (GER) – swimming Ma Xiaoxu (CHN) – football	
2008	Lewis Hamilton in 2008	Lewis Hamilton	GBR	Formula One	Novak Djokovic (SRB) – tennis Tyson Gay (USA) – athletics Alberto Contador (ESP) – cycling Oscar Pistorius (RSA) – athletics Casey Stoner (AUS) – MotoGP	
2009	Rebecca Adlington in 2008	Rebecca Adlington	GBR	Swimming	Novak Djokovic (SRB) – tennis Ana Ivanovic (SRB) – tennis Anthony Kim (USA) – golf Sebastian Vettel (GER) – Formula One; Zou Kai (CHN) – gymnastics	
2010	Jenson Button in 2010	Jenson Button	GBR	Formula One	Mark Cavendish (GBR) – cycling Tom Daley (GBR) – diving Juan Martín del Potro (ARG) – tennis Jiyai Shin (KOR) – golf VfL Wolfsburg (GER) – football	
2011	Martin Kaymer in 2012	Martin Kaymer	GER	Golf	Christophe Lemaitre (FRA) – athletics Teddy Tamgho (FRA) – athletics Louis Oosthuizen (RSA) – golf Matteo Manassero (ITA) – golf Thomas Müller (GER) – football	
2012	McIlroy in 2013	Rory McIlroy	GBR	Golf	Li Na (CHN) – tennis Oscar Pistorius (RSA) – athletics Mo Farah (GBR) – athletics Petra Kvitová (CZE) – tennis Yohan Blake (JAM) – athletics	
2013	Andy Murray in 2013	Andy Murray	GBR	Tennis	Gabby Douglas (USA) – gymnastics Kirani James (GRN) – athletics Neymar (BRA) – football Yannick Agnel (FRA) – swimming Ye Shiwen (CHN) – swimming	
2014	Marc Márquez in 2015	Marc Márquez	ESP	MotoGP	Afghanistan men's national cricket team (AFG) – cricket Raphael Holzdeppe (GER) – athletics Nairo Quintana (COL) – cycling Justin Rose (GBR) – golf Adam Scott (AUS) – golf	
2015	Daniel Ricciardo in 2015	Daniel Ricciardo	AUS	Formula One	Marin Čilić (CRO) – tennis Mario Götze (GER) – football Switzerland Davis Cup team (SUI) – tennis Mikaela Shiffrin (USA) – alpine skiing James Rodríguez (COL) – football	
2016	Jordan Spieth in 2015	Jordan Spieth	USA	Golf	Max Verstappen (NED) – Formula One; Chile men's national football team (CHI) – football Adam Peaty (GBR) – swimming Tyson Fury (GBR) – boxing Jason Day (AUS) – golf	
2017	Nico Rosberg in 2016	Nico Rosberg	GER	Formula One	Almaz Ayana (ETH) – athletics Fiji men's rugby sevens team (FIJ) – rugby sevens Iceland men's football team (ISL) – football Leicester City F.C. (GBR) – football Wayde van Niekerk (RSA) – athletics	
2018	Sergio Garcia in 2013	Sergio García	ESP	Golf	Giannis Antetokounmpo (GRE) – basketball Caeleb Dressel (USA) – swimming Anthony Joshua (GBR) – boxing Kylian Mbappé (FRA) – football Jeļena Ostapenko (LAT) – tennis	
2019		Naomi Osaka	JPN	Tennis	Ana Carrasco (ESP) – MotoGP; Jakob Ingebrigtsen (NOR) – athletics Geraint Thomas (GBR) – cycling Sofia Goggia (ITA) – Alpine skiing Briana Williams (JAM) – athletics	
2020	Bernal in 2019	Egan Bernal	COL	Cycling	Andy Ruiz (USA) – boxing Bianca Andreescu (CAN) – tennis Coco Gauff (USA) – tennis Japan men's rugby team (JPN) – rugby union Regan Smith (USA) – swimming	
2021	Patrick Mahomes	Patrick Mahomes	USA	American football	Ansu Fati (ESP) – football Joan Mir (ESP) – MotoGP; Tadej Pogačar (SVN) – cycling Iga Świątek (POL) – tennis Dominic Thiem (AUT) – tennis	
2022	Emma Raducanu	Emma Raducanu	GBR	Tennis	Neeraj Chopra (IND) – athletics Daniil Medvedev (RUS) – tennis Pedri (ESP) – football Yulimar Rojas (VEN) – athletics Ariarne Titmus (AUS) – swimming	
2023	Carlos Alcaraz	Carlos Alcaraz	ESP	Tennis	Elena Rybakina (KAZ) – Tennis; Morocco men's national football team (MAR) – football Nathan Chen (USA) – Figure skating Scottie Scheffler (USA) – Golf; Tobi Amusan (NGR) – Athletics	
2024		Jude Bellingham	GBR	Football	Linda Caicedo (COL) – Football; Coco Gauff (USA) - Tennis; Qin Haiyang (CHN) – Swimming; Josh Kerr (GBR) – Athletics; Salma Paralluelo (ESP) – Football	
2025		Lamine Yamal	ESP	Football	Julien Alfred (LCA) – Athletics; Bayer 04 Leverkusen (GER) – Football; Summer McIntosh (CAN) – Swimming; Letsile Tebogo (BOT) – Athletics; Victor Wembanyama (FRA) – Basketball	
2026		Lando Norris	GBR	Formula One	Désiré Doué (FRA) – football João Fonseca (BRA) – tennis Shai Gilgeous-Alexander (CAN) – basketball Luke Littler (GBR) – darts Yu Zidi (CHN) – swimming	

== Statistics ==
Statistics are correct as of 2026 winners.

Winners by nationality
Country	Winners	Nominations
GBR	8	17
ESP	6	10
USA	3	20
GER	2	8
CHN	2	7
COL	2	3
AUS	1	6
FRA	1	7
RUS	1	3
JPN	1	1
RSA	0	4
ARG	0	3
SRB	0	3
BEL	0	2
BRA	0	3
CAN	0	3
ITA	0	2
JAM	0	2
NED	0	2
ENG	0	2
AFG	0	1
AUT	0	1
BOT	0	1
CHI	0	1
CRO	0	1
CZE	0	1
ETH	0	1
FIJ	0	1
GHA	0	1
GRN	0	1
GRE	0	1
IND	0	1
ISL	0	1
JPN	0	1
KAZ	0	1
KOR	0	1
LAT	0	1
LCA	0	1
MAR	0	1
NGR	0	1
NOR	0	1
POL	0	1
SVK	0	1
SVN	0	1
SUI	0	1
VEN	0	1

Winners by sport
Sport	Winners	Nominations
Tennis	7	24
Golf	6	11
Formula One	6	6
Football	2	23
Athletics	1	21
Swimming	1	9
Cycling	1	5
MotoGP	1	4
Basketball	1	3
American football	1	2
Boxing	0	4
Alpine skiing	0	2
Cricket	0	2
Gymnastics	0	2
Auto racing	0	1
Diving	0	1
Figure skating	0	1
Rugby sevens	0	1
Speed skating	0	1

== See also ==
- Best Breakthrough Athlete ESPY Award
