= Rocafonda =

Neighbourhood of Mataró, Spain

Coordinates: 41.55°N 2.45°E

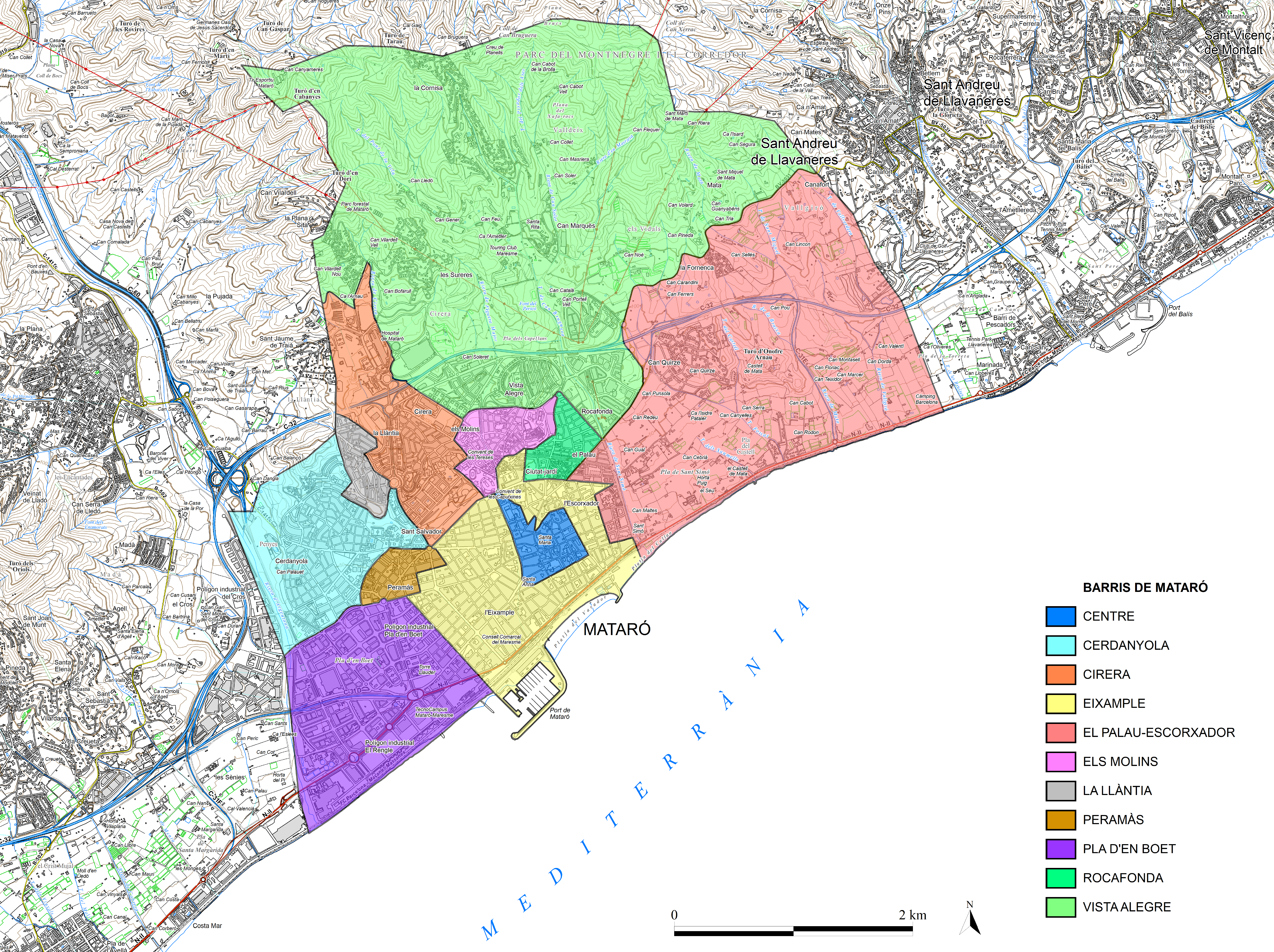
Map of the neighbourhoods of Mataró. Rocafonda is the darker green area, near the centre of the map.

Rocafonda is a neighbourhood of the city of Mataró in Catalonia, Spain.

Rocafonda was built in the 1960s to accommodate immigration from southern Spanish regions such as Andalusia and Extremadura. While the rest of Mataró had low houses, high tower blocks were built in Rocafonda, producing a high population density. Rapid immigration led to shortages of school places and poor roads and water supply, leading to the formation of an organised neighbourhood group in the 1970s. In the 1990s, Rocafonda's original southern Spanish inhabitants moved to richer neighbourhoods, and foreign migrants moved in due to the low cost of living.

In 2023, Rocafonda had a population of 11,664. Of these, 52% were born outside Catalonia, including 37% born abroad. Its percentage of foreign-born residents was 17 and 19 percentage points higher than the figures for Mataró and Spain as a whole, respectively. Of the foreign population, 58% are from Morocco. Around half of the Rocafonda population lives below the poverty line, and as of 2021, it is the area with the lowest income in the comarca of Maresme.

The neighbourhood gained international attention during UEFA Euro 2024 due to Lamine Yamal, a Spain national football team player raised there. He celebrated his goals by gesturing the number "304", referring to the local postcode of 08304. José Manuel Gómez Jurado, a politician of the party Por Andalucía, repeated the gesture in the Parliament of Andalusia in response to an anti-immigration speech by Vox's Purificación Fernández.
