= Lamine Yamal =

Spanish footballer (born 2007)

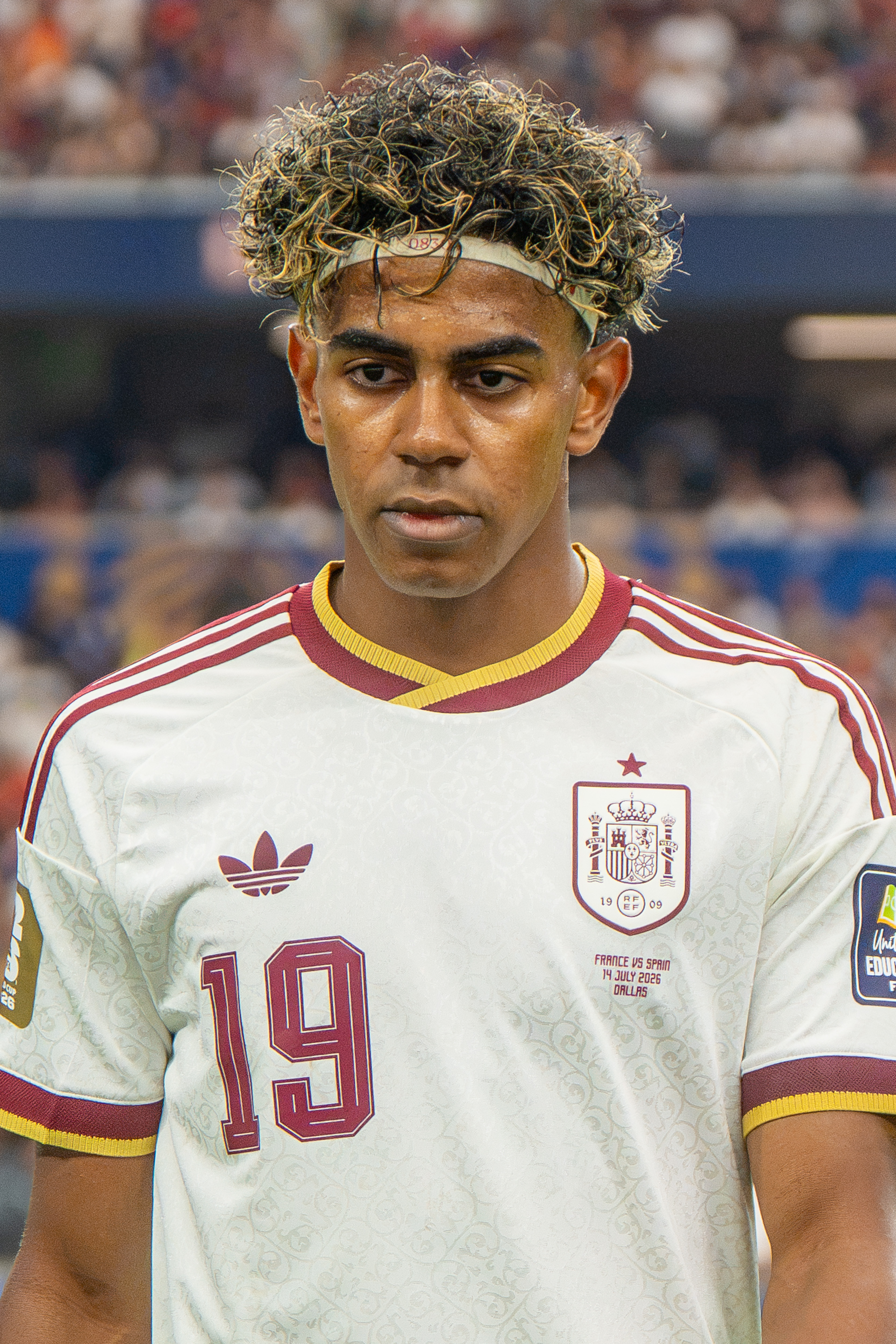
- Yamal with Spain in 2026

Personal information
- Full name: Lamine Yamal Nasraoui Ebana
- Date of birth: 13 July 2007 (age 19)
- Place of birth: Esplugues de Llobregat, Spain
- Height: 1.78 m (5 ft 10 in)
- Position: Right winger

Team information
- Current team: Barcelona
- Number: 10

Youth career
- 2012–2014: La Torreta
- 2014–2023: Barcelona

Senior career*
Years	Team	Apps	(Gls)
2023	Barcelona B	1	(0)
2023–	Barcelona	114	(40)

International career^{‡}
2021	Spain U15	6	(3)
2022	Spain U16	4	(1)
2022–2023	Spain U17	10	(8)
2022	Spain U19	1	(0)
2023–	Spain	38	(11)
Medal record
Men's football
Representing Spain
FIFA World Cup
Winner	2026 Canada–Mexico–US
UEFA European Championship
Winner	2024 Germany
UEFA Nations League
Runner-up	2025 Germany
- * Club domestic league appearances and goals as of 23:11, 22 November 2026 (UTC) ‡ National team caps and goals as of 22:05, 15 November 2026 (UTC)

Lamine Yamal Nasraoui Ebana (Note: Spanish pronunciation: [laˈmiɲ ɟʝaˈmal nasˈraɣwj eˈβana]; Catalan pronunciation: [ləˈmin jəˈmal nəzˈrawi əˈβanə].) (Note: English-language publications such as The New York Times, Chicago Tribune, and Al Jazeera refer to him simply as "Yamal". However, Kyle Bonn of The Sporting News has written that it is improper to call him "Yamal", as it is not his surname.) (born 13 July 2007) is a Spanish professional footballer who plays as a right winger for the La Liga club Barcelona and the Spain national team. He is widely regarded as one of the best players in the world. (Note: Attributed to multiple references:)

Yamal was a member of Barcelona's youth academy, La Masia, before joining the first team in the 2023–24 season at the age of 15. At age 17, he became the youngest player to be nominated for the Ballon d'Or; he finished second in voting for the award in 2025, and finished third in 2026. In 2024, 2025 and 2026 he won the Kopa Trophy, awarded to the best young player in the world. Under manager Hansi Flick, Yamal helped Barcelona win a domestic treble during the 2024–25 season: La Liga, the Copa del Rey and the Supercopa de España. Barcelona retained the La Liga title in the 2025–26 season, with Yamal being named La Liga Player of the Season.

Yamal has represented Spain internationally at various youth levels and made his debut for the senior team in 2023, becoming the youngest player to represent the country at age 16. In 2024, he became the youngest player to score in the UEFA European Championship, earning the Young Player Award as Spain achieved their fourth title. He won a World Cup title with Spain at his FIFA World Cup debut in 2026.

== Early life ==
Lamine Yamal Nasraoui Ebana was born on 13 July 2007, in Esplugues de Llobregat in the Barcelona metropolitan area in Catalonia, Spain. Yamal's father, Mounir Nasraoui, is from a village between Larache and Ksar el-Kebir in Morocco. His mother, Sheila Ebana, is from Bata, Equatorial Guinea. (Note: Attributed to multiple references:) Yamal has a younger half-brother and a younger half-sister. His first and middle name honour two family friends, Lamine and Yamal, who helped his parents financially shortly before Yamal was born.

As a baby he was featured in a 2007 UNICEF charity photo shoot with his future club Barcelona, during which he was bathed by a 20-year-old Lionel Messi. The photos went viral online in 2024 after Yamal's father posted one of them online. Two years later, the photos received additional attention in the media as Yamal and Messi prepared to face each other in the 2026 FIFA World Cup final. (Note: Attributed to multiple references:)

An important figure in Yamal's upbringing was his paternal grandmother, Fatima, who migrated from Tangier, Morocco, to Spain in 1990. Facing financial hardship, she worked to anchor the family in Rocafonda, a neighbourhood in the city of Mataró in Catalonia. When Yamal's parents separated during his early childhood, Fatima took on a vital role in raising him, managing his daily routine and ensuring he could attend training sessions. Yamal started playing football at the age of four at local club La Torreta in Granollers, where his mother was living. He alternated between Mataró and Granollers to spend time with both his parents. His goal celebrations include a hand gesture indicating the number 304, the last three digits of the Rocafonda postcode 08304. Following his success, his popularisation of the number has been credited with bringing pride and recognition to the working class community of Rocafonda.

At six years old, Yamal was scouted by Barcelona and was invited to training sessions at La Masia. He signed for the club in 2014 and moved to Barcelona to live and train at the academy. Growing up, Yamal's footballing idols were Ronaldinho, Messi and Neymar.

== Club career ==
=== Early career ===
As Yamal progressed through the ranks of Barcelona's La Masia youth academy, he was soon considered one of its best prospects. Initially added to the Juvenil A team – already above his age grade – for the 2022–23 season, Yamal was selected by Xavi to train with the first team along with other young players in early September 2022. (Note: Attributed to multiple references:) He made his first-team debut on 29 April 2023, replacing Gavi in the 83rd minute of a 4–0 victory against Real Betis in La Liga, in which he registered a shot on target. At 15 years, 9 months, and 16 days old, he was the third youngest player to appear for Barcelona's first team after Armando Sagi in 1920 and Paulino Alcántara in 1912. On 14 May 2023, Yamal was a member of the Barcelona squad that won the 2022–23 La Liga championship.

=== 2023–24 season: First team breakthrough ===
Although Yamal remained on Barcelona's reserve team throughout the 2023–24 season, he earned his first start for the club on 20 August 2023 during a 2–0 victory over Cádiz at the Estadi Olímpic Lluís Companys. He became the youngest Barcelona starter in history, and was met with a standing ovation. In his next starting appearance, he was named Man of the Match after providing two assists during a 4–3 victory over Villarreal on 28 August. He was named the inaugural U23 Player of the Month for August as a result of his performances. On 19 September, Yamal made his Champions League debut in a 5–0 victory over Royal Antwerp, becoming the second-youngest player in history to play in the tournament. On 2 October, he extended his contract with Barcelona until 2026, with a buyout clause of €1 billion. The following week, he scored his first senior goal during a 2–2 draw with Granada. In early December, Yamal was given the inaugural Golden Boy The Youngest trophy, which is awarded to the youngest player nominated for the Golden Boy award.

On 11 January 2024, Yamal scored in a 2–0 win over Osasuna in the semi-final of the Supercopa de España, becoming the youngest player to score in the Supercopa, at 16 years and 182 days old. Two weeks later, he scored in the Copa del Rey quarter-final against Athletic Bilbao in an eventual 4–2 loss after extra time, becoming the youngest goalscorer in the competition's history. On 11 February, Yamal scored his first brace in a 3–3 draw against Granada, and was named Man of the Match. At the conclusion of the 2023–24 season, Barcelona finished second in La Liga and were eliminated from Champions League contention in the quarter-finals by Paris Saint-Germain (PSG). Yamal served an assist against PSG in the second leg, which Barcelona lost 4–1.

=== 2024–25 season: 100th appearance for Barcelona and second Kopa Trophy ===
In the first match of the 2024–25 La Liga season on 18 August, Yamal served an assist to help Barcelona defeat Valencia 2–1. In the following match against Athletic Bilbao on 24 August, he scored his first goal of the season in another 2–1 victory. On 19 September, he scored his first Champions League goal during a 2–1 loss to Monaco in the Champions League league phase, becoming the second-youngest scorer in Champions League history. On 26 October, he became the youngest goalscorer in El Clásico history when he scored once in a 4-0 victory over Real Madrid at the Santiago Bernabeu in Madrid. During the match, Yamal and his teammates Fati and Raphinha were targeted with racial abuse by a group of Real Madrid supporters.

After scoring in a 5–0 win over Valencia in the Copa del Rey quarter-finals on 6 February 2025, Yamal failed to score for over a month. His goalscoring drought in La Liga ran from 26 October 2024 to 18 March 2025, prompting former player Francesco Totti to label him a player who scores "few goals". During this period, manager Hansi Flick defended Yamal, stating: "Everyone wants to score, but he creates a lot of chances. The important thing is that the team scores, not who scores." On 30 April, Yamal made his 100th appearance for Barcelona in the Champions League semi-finals against Inter Milan, scoring a goal in a 3–3 draw during the first leg. He was described by Inter Milan manager Simone Inzaghi as "a phenomenon born every 50 years".

At the end of the season, Yamal became the first player to win the Kopa Trophy twice, and finished second in voting for the Ballon d’Or. He was also ranked as the second-best winger, behind Mohamed Salah, in ESPN's annual list of Best Male Footballers in the World. He was awarded the La Liga Goal of the Month in March 2024 and was named La Liga U23 Player of the Month for August 2024 and February 2025, as well as La Liga Player of the Month for September 2024, November 2025, and December 2025. Yamal was also IFFHS Men's Player of the Month in April 2025.

=== 2025–26 season: Long-term contract ===
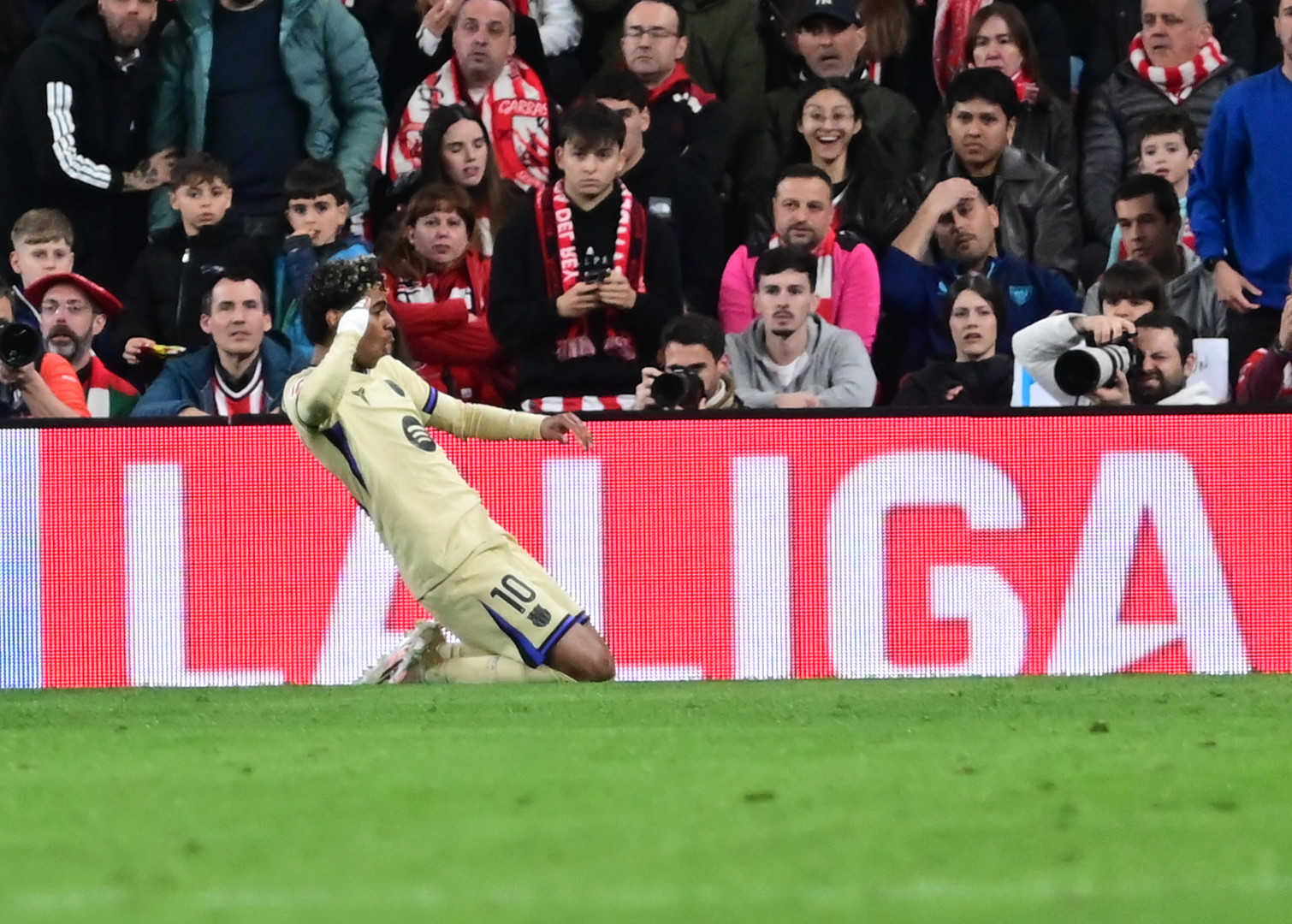
Yamal celebrating a goal for Barcelona against Athletic Bilbao in 2026

On 27 May 2025, Yamal agreed to his first long-term contract with Barcelona, tying him to the club until June 2031 and to be signed upon his eighteenth birthday. The Athletic reported that his contract could potentially reach a value of $45.3 million per year gross—including wages, bonuses and contract fees—making him one of Barcelona's top-paid players. At the contract signing event on 16 July, Yamal was presented with Barcelona's number 10 shirt. On 22 September, he finished second in voting for the 2025 Ballon d'Or, behind the winner Ousmane Dembélé. Yamal's father called the Ballon d'Or result "the biggest moral damage done to a human being". He added: "I think Lamine Yamal is the best player in the world by far, by a huge margin. Not because he's my son, but because he's the best player in the world. I think there are no rivals."

On 28 February 2026, Yamal scored his first career hat-trick in a 4–1 win over Villarreal. In late April, he suffered a torn hamstring, which sidelined him for the rest of the 2025–26 season. He finished the season as the club's top scorer, with 24 goals and 17 assists in all competitions, including 16 goals and 11 assists in La Liga. He was named La Liga Player of the Month for April 2026. At the end of the season, ESPN ranked Yamal as the second-best winger, behind Michael Olise, in its annual list of Best Male Footballers in the World.

=== 2026–27 season ===
On 23 August 2026, Yamal was a starter in Barcelona's 5–0 victory against Elche, and was substituted off after 65 minutes. Coach Hansi Flick said that Yamal was suffering from headaches and was not in his best physical condition at the start of the season due to a short preseason. On 31 August, Yamal scored his first two goals of the season in a 5–2 win over Rayo Vallecano, bringing his official tally for Barcelona to 51 goals. In doing so, he became the youngest player in the history of Europe's top five leagues to reach the 50-goal mark, breaking the record previously held by Kylian Mbappé. On 6 September, Yamal scored twice in a 5–0 victory over Valencia.

On 9 September, 19-year-old Yamal became the youngest player to captain Barcelona when captain Raphinha was substituted off during a 5–1 Champions League win over Feyenoord. Yamal scored and provided two assists in the match. Barcelona's 4–2 win over Levante on 13 September marked Yamal's third consecutive league game in which he scored a brace, making him the second Barcelona player in history to register three braces in the first five La Liga matches of a season, after Lionel Messi during the 2012–13 season.

On 26 October, Yamal came in third in voting for the 2026 Ballon d'Or, behind runner-up Kylian Mbappé and winner Harry Kane. Leading up to the award ceremony, commentators observed that Yamal and several other candidates publicly campaigned for the Ballon d'Or to a much higher degree than candidates in previous years. (Note: Attributed to multiple references:)

Yamal became the highest-scoring teenager in UEFA Champions League history after scoring once in a 3–0 win against Aston Villa on 3 November, bringing his career total in the competition to 14 goals and surpassing the previous record set by Mbappé.

== International career ==
=== Catalonia ===
Yamal played for youth teams of the Catalonia national football team from a young age. He was the captain of the under-12, under-14 and under-16 teams. While playing for the U16 team in November 2022, he scored in a match against Castile and León. Later that month he scored from a penalty, provided an assist, and received a red card in a 2–2 draw with Aragon that sent Catalonia through to the Fase d'Or of the 2022–23 Spanish regional team championship. Yamal was not called up to the squad for the Fase d'Or in 2023.

=== Spain ===
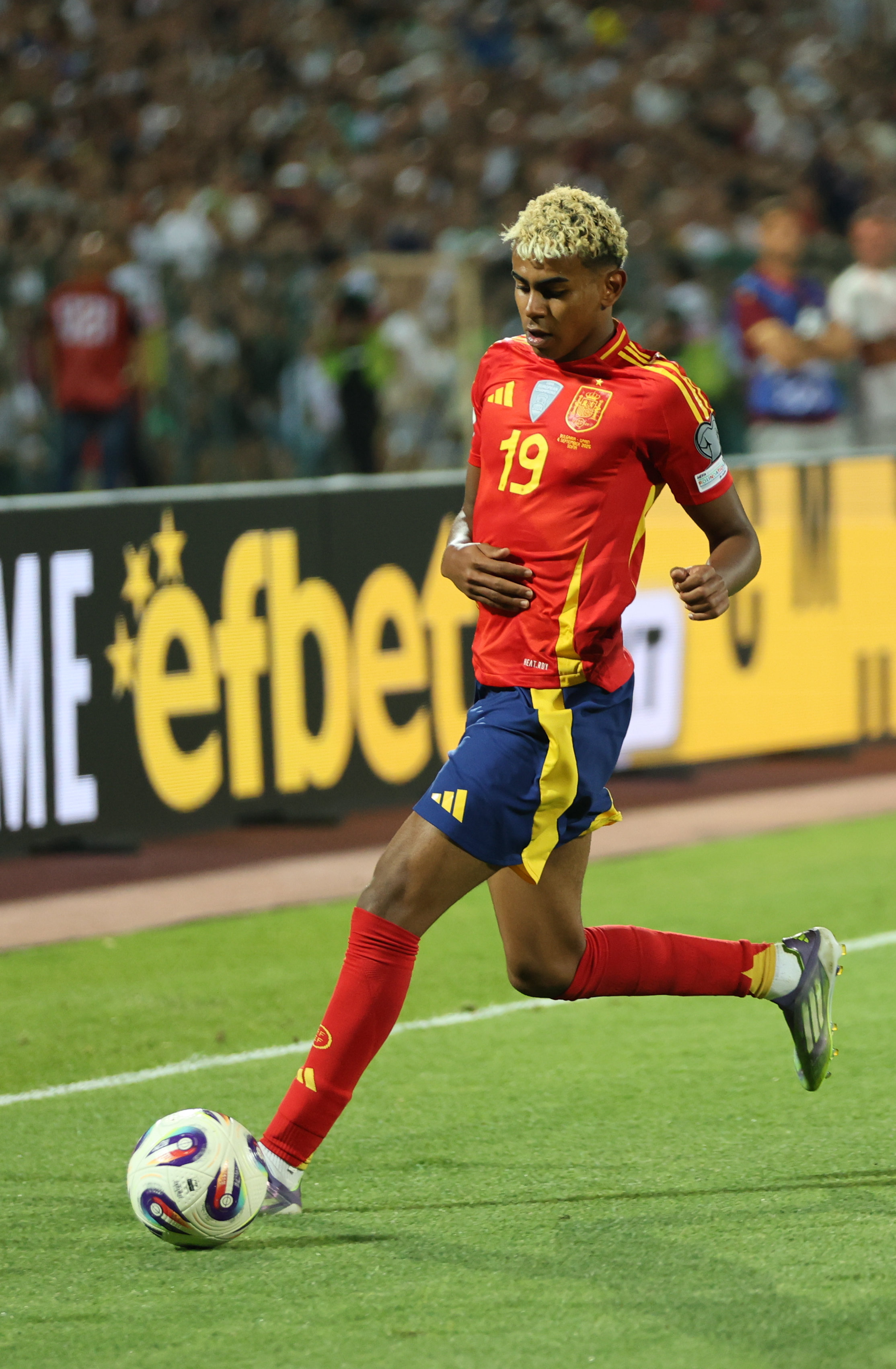
Yamal with Spain in 2025

Yamal played for Spain's U15, U16 and U17 youth teams, (Note: Attributed to multiple references:) and scored four goals in the 2023 European U17 Championship. In September 2023, he was called up to the senior international team for the UEFA Euro 2024 qualifiers. He made his senior debut against Georgia on 8 September, scoring once in a 7–1 victory. At the age of 16 years and 57 days old, he became the youngest player and goalscorer for Spain, breaking previous records held by Gavi. He also became the youngest goalscorer in a Euro qualifying match, overtaking Gareth Bale. Yamal was called back to the Spain squad in October 2023 for the remaining Euro qualifying matches against Scotland and Norway. Spain won both matches and qualified for Euro 2024.

==== Euro 2024 champion ====
On 7 June 2024, Yamal was selected for the 26-man squad for the UEFA Euro 2024 tournament. On 15 June, he became the youngest player to appear in the competition, at age 16 years and 338 days. During a match against Croatia, he set up Dani Carvajal's goal in a 3–0 victory, becoming the youngest player to provide an assist in the tournament's history. In the round of 16 match against Georgia, he provided another assist in a 4–1 victory.

Yamal provided an assist against Germany in a 2–1 quarter-final win, tying the Spain national team record of three assists in a single Euro tournament. In Spain's 2–1 semi-final victory over France, he scored with a curling shot from outside the penalty area, becoming the youngest goalscorer in Euro tournament history four days before his 17th birthday. His goal was named the goal of the tournament. (Note: Attributed to multiple references:) During Spain's 2–1 victory against England in the final, Yamal served his fourth assist of the tournament to Nico Williams for Spain's first goal, becoming the joint top assist provider for a single Euro tournament. Yamal became the youngest player to win the Euros and was named Young Player of the Tournament. (Note: Attributed to multiple references:) In the 2024–25 UEFA Nations League, Yamal scored two goals in a 5–4 semi-final victory against France.

==== 2026 World Cup champion ====
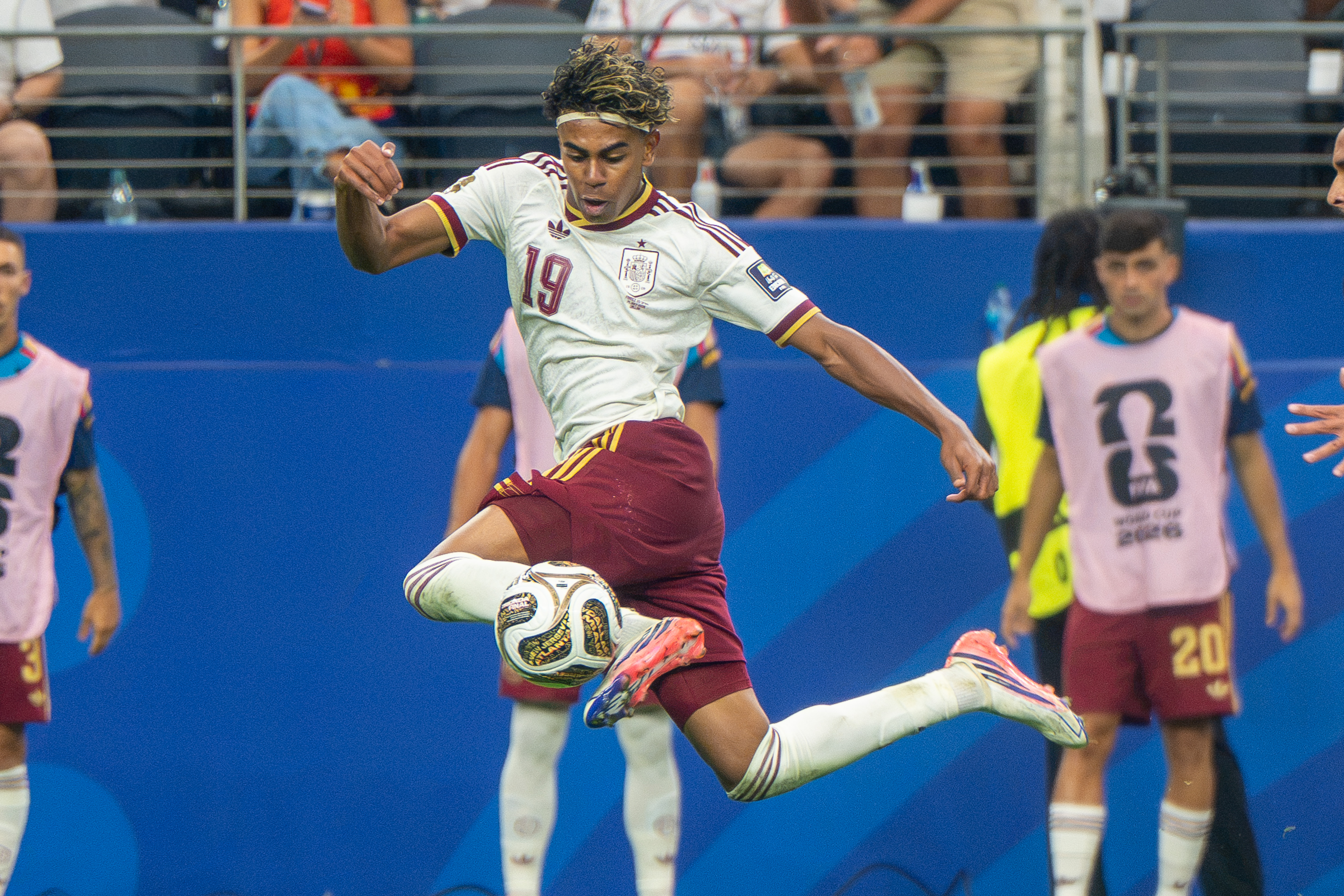
Yamal with Spain playing against France during the 2026 World Cup semifinals

On 25 May 2026, Yamal was named to the 26-man squad for the 2026 FIFA World Cup. He arrived in the United States as he was recovering from a biceps femoris injury that he suffered during the Barcelona season. Spain manager Luis de la Fuente decided that Yamal was not ready to start in the opening match against Cape Verde, instead sending him on as a substitute in the second half of the eventual 0–0 draw. On 21 June, Yamal scored his first World Cup goal as Spain defeated Saudi Arabia 4–0 in the group stage, becoming the second player aged 18 or younger to score the opening goal in a World Cup match since Pelé in 1958. He was named Man of the Match in Spain's 3–0 round of 32 win against Austria and its 2–1 quarter-final win against Belgium. (Note: Attributed to multiple references:) Spain later defeated Argentina in the final 1–0, with Yamal becoming the youngest player to win both the World Cup and the UEFA European Championship at 19 years and six days old. (Note: Attributed to multiple references:) He also became the third-youngest player to appear in or win a World Cup final after Pelé and Giuseppe Bergomi. Yamal completed 35 dribbles during the tournament, the most of any player. Liam Twomey of The Athletic said that Yamal won the World Cup "without having a single great game" and that "even in this form, he is more dangerous than just about any winger on the planet." According to Fox Sports, Yamal "showed flashes of his individual brilliance throughout Spain's run", although he had "not consistently reached the remarkable standards he set for himself".

== Player profile ==
=== Style of play ===
A left-footed forward known for his dribbling, passing and chance-creating abilities, Yamal most often plays as a winger, primarily on the right flank. (Note: Attributed to multiple references:) His accurate crosses with the outside of his foot (known as trivelas) have become one of the trademarks of his game.

=== Reception ===
With his technical profile, Yamal has been compared to Lionel Messi. He has also drawn comparisons with Neymar due to their similar playing style that involves a lot of dribbling, flair and chance creation. Yamal has stated that Neymar is a major influence on the way he plays. Between 2024 and 2026, Yamal was ranked as the best young player in the world (La Vanguardia), the best player under 21 years of age (ESPN), the all-time greatest teenage player (Goal), the second-best player in the world (The Guardian), and the best player in the world (Sky Sports).

== Personal life ==
=== Religion ===
Yamal is a Muslim and observes Ramadan, which requires him to fast from dawn until sunset for roughly a month, including on training and match days.

=== Relationships ===
Yamal was briefly in a relationship with Argentine singer Nicki Nicole; the two separated in October 2025. In May 2026, Yamal went public with his relationship with Spanish content creator Inés García.

=== Advocacy ===
After Spain's friendly match with Egypt in Barcelona on 31 March 2026, Yamal condemned anti-Muslim and xenophobic chants against Egyptian players by Spanish fans. (Note: Attributed to multiple references:) He said the chants "were aimed at the opposing team and were not something personal against me, but as a Muslim, it is still a lack of respect and something intolerable." During a parade celebrating Barcelona's La Liga title victory on 11 May 2026, Yamal showed solidarity with Palestinians by waving a Palestinian flag. His action was praised by fans, pro-Palestinian activists, and the Spanish prime minister Pedro Sánchez, while drawing criticism from Israel's defence minister Israel Katz. (Note: Attributed to multiple references:) In June 2026, Yamal was named a UNICEF Goodwill Ambassador, focusing on children's right to play and supporting children living in humanitarian crisis situations.

=== Criticisms ===
Yamal drew criticism after hiring entertainers with dwarfism for his mafia-themed 18th birthday party in July 2025. Spain’s Association for People with Achondroplasia and Other Skeletal Dysplasia (ADEE) publicly condemned Yamal's actions, with its president stating: "It’s unacceptable that in the 21st century, people with dwarfism continue to be used as entertainment at private parties". ADEE filed a legal complaint prompting the Directorate General to direct the Prosecutor's Office to investigate the matter to determine whether the law and the rights of people with disabilities had been violated. An unnamed performer with dwarfism, claiming to have been hired by Yamal, spoke to a Spanish radio station saying, "No one disrespected us, we worked in peace," and accused the ADEE of endangering the livelihood of people with dwarfism without offering them any alternatives.

== Career statistics ==
=== Club ===
As of match played 22 November 2026

Appearances and goals by club, season and competition
Club	Season	League			Copa del Rey		Europe		Other		Total	
Club	Season	Division	Apps	Goals	Apps	Goals	Apps	Goals	Apps	Goals	Apps	Goals
Barcelona B	2022–23	Primera Federación	1	0	—		—		2 (Note: Appearances in Primera Federación play-offs)	0	3	0
Barcelona	2022–23	La Liga	1	0	0	0	0	0	0	0	1	0
Barcelona	2023–24	La Liga	37	5	1	1	10 (Note: Appearances in UEFA Champions League)	0	2 (Note: Appearances in Supercopa de España)	1	50	7
Barcelona	2024–25	La Liga	35	9	5	2	13	5	2	2	55	18
Barcelona	2025–26	La Liga	28	16	5	2	10	6	2	0	45	24
Barcelona	2026–27	La Liga	13	10	0	0	4	3	0	0	17	13
Barcelona	Total		114	40	11	5	37	14	6	3	168	62
Career total			115	40	11	5	37	14	8	3	171	62

=== International ===
As of match played 15 November 2026

Appearances and goals by national team and year
National team	Year	Apps	Goals
Spain	2023	4	2
Spain	2024	13	1
Spain	2025	6	3
Spain	2026	15	5
Total		38	11

As of match played 3 October 2026.
Spain score listed first, score column indicates score after each Yamal goal.

List of international goals scored by Lamine Yamal
No.	Date	Venue	Cap	Opponent	Score	Result	Competition
1	8 September 2023	Boris Paichadze Dinamo Arena, Tbilisi, Georgia	1	Georgia	7–1	7–1	UEFA Euro 2024 qualifying
2	16 November 2023	Alphamega Stadium, Limassol, Cyprus	3	Cyprus	1–0	3–1	UEFA Euro 2024 qualifying
3	9 July 2024	Allianz Arena, Munich, Germany	13	France	1–1	2–1	UEFA Euro 2024
4	23 March 2025	Mestalla Stadium, Valencia, Spain	19	Netherlands	3–2	3–3 (a.e.t.) (5–4 p)	2024–25 UEFA Nations League A
5	5 June 2025	MHPArena, Stuttgart, Germany	20	France	3–0	5–4	2025 UEFA Nations League Finals
6	5 June 2025	MHPArena, Stuttgart, Germany	20	France	5–1	5–4	2025 UEFA Nations League Finals
7	21 June 2026	Mercedes-Benz Stadium, Atlanta, United States	27	Saudi Arabia	1–0	4–0	2026 FIFA World Cup
8	26 September 2026	Wembley Stadium, London, England	34	England	1–0	3–2	2026–27 UEFA Nations League A
9	29 September 2026	Ramón Sánchez-Pizjuán Stadium, Seville, Spain	35	Croatia	1–0	4–1	2026–27 UEFA Nations League A
10	29 September 2026	Ramón Sánchez-Pizjuán Stadium, Seville, Spain	35	Croatia	3–1	4–1	2026–27 UEFA Nations League A
11	3 October 2026	Estadio Carlos Tartiere, Oviedo, Spain	36	Czech Republic	1–0	3–1	2026–27 UEFA Nations League A

== Honours ==
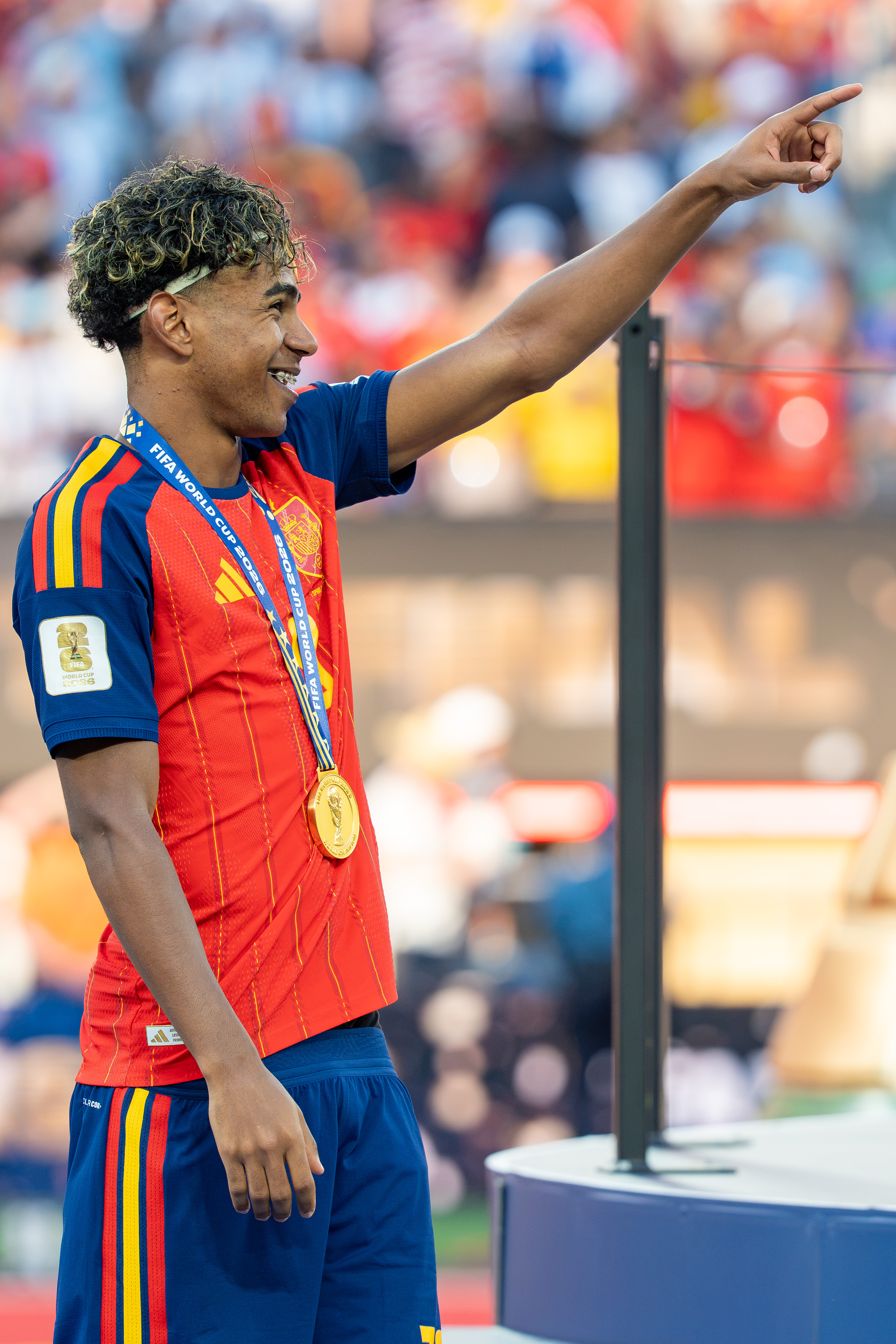
Yamal after winning the 2026 World Cup final

Barcelona

- La Liga: 2022–23, 2024–25, 2025–26
- Copa del Rey: 2024–25
- Supercopa de España: 2025, 2026

Spain

- FIFA World Cup: 2026
- UEFA European Championship: 2024
- UEFA Nations League runner-up: 2024–25

Individual

- Ballon d’Or runner-up: 2025, third place: 2026
- The Best FIFA Men's Player runner-up: 2025
- FIFPRO World 11: 2025, 2026
- FIFA Men's World 11: 2024, 2025
- Globe Soccer Awards – Emerging Player: 2024 (Europe Edition), 2024 (Dubai Edition)
- Globe Soccer Awards Forward of the Year: 2025
- Golden Boy: 2024
- WhoScored European Player of the Season (performance data by Opta): 2024–25
- CIES Football Observatory Most Influential Player of the Season runner-up: 2024–25
- IFFHS Men's World's Best Youth Player: 2024, 2025,2026
- IFFHS Men's World Team: 2024, 2025
- IFFHS Men's UEFA Team: 2024
- IFFHS Men's Youth (U20) World Team: 2024
- IFFHS Men's Youth (U20) UEFA Team: 2023, 2024
- Kopa Trophy: 2024, 2025, 2026
- La Liga U23 Player of the Month: August 2023, August 2024, February 2025
- La Liga Goal of the Month: March 2024, October 2026
- La Liga U23 Player of the Season: 2023–24, 2024–25
- La Liga Player of the Season: 2025–26
- La Liga Team of the Season: 2024–25, 2025–26
- Memorial Aldo Rovira Award: 2023–24, 2024–25
- Barça Players Award: 2023–24
- Laureus World Sports Award for Breakthrough of the Year: 2025
- Laureus World Sports Award for Young Sportsperson of the Year : 2026.
- Maradona Award: 2025
- UEFA Champions League Team of the Season: 2024–25
- UEFA European Under-17 Championship Team of the Tournament: 2023
- UEFA European Under-17 Championship top scorer: 2023 (4 goals)
- UEFA European Championship top assist provider: 2024 (4 assists)
- UEFA European Championship Team of the Tournament: 2024
- UEFA European Championship Young Player of the Tournament: 2024
- UEFA European Championship Goal of the Tournament: 2024
- UEFA Nations League Finals top scorer: 2025 (shared)
- Zarra Trophy: 2025–26
- AFE Awards – Best Primera División player: 2024–25, 2025–26

== See also ==
- Afro-Spaniards – Ethnic group in Spain
