= 2025–26 CD Castellón season =

CD Castellón
2025–26 season
- President: Haralabos Voulgaris
- Manager: Johan Plat (until 16 September); Pablo Hernández (from 16 September)
- Stadium: Estadi Castàlia
- Segunda División: 6th
- Copa del Rey: First round
- Top goalscorer: League: Álex Calatrava (14); All: Álex Calatrava (14)
- Highest home attendance: 12,255 vs Zaragoza
- Lowest home attendance: 11,370 vs Valladolid
- Biggest win: Cultural Leonesa 1–3 Castellón
- Biggest defeat: Racing Santander 3–1 Castellón
Home colours	Away colours	Third colours

The 2025–26 season is the 104th in the history of Club Deportivo Castellón and the club's second consecutive season in LaLiga 2, following promotion from the third tier, Primera Federación. The season also includes participation in the Copa del Rey. Competitive fixtures began on 16 August.

== Squad ==
No.	Name	Position	Nationality	Age	Joined
1	Amir Abedzadeh	GK	(Iran)	33	2024
13	Romain Matthys	GK	(Belgium)	28	2025
4	Agustín Sienra	DF	(Argentina)	27	2025
12	Lucas Alcázar	DF	(Spain)	24	2025
26	Tincho Conde	DF	(Spain)	23	2025
5	Alberto Jiménez	DF	(Spain)	33	2023
55	Michał Willmann	DF	(Poland)	22	2025
3	Fabrizio Brignani	DF	(Italy)	28	2025
22	Jérémy Mellot	DF	(France)	32	2025
17	Salva Ruiz	DF	(Spain)	31	2021
14	Óscar Gil	DF	(Spain)	31	2022
20	Nick Markanich	MF	(United States)	26	2024
23	Kenneth Mamah	MF	(Nigeria)	28	2024
10	Israel Suero	MF	(Spain)	32	2023
7	Awer Mabil	MF	(Australia)	31	2025
8	Diego Barri	MF	(Spain)	31	2025
15	Beñat Gerenabarrena	MF	(Spain)	23	2025
6	Marc-Olivier Doué	MF	(France)	26	2025
18	Pablo Santiago	MF	(Spain)	26	2025
25	Ronaldo Pompeu	MF	(Brazil)	36	2025
29	Tommaso De Nipoti	MF	(Italy)	23	2025
21	Álex Calatrava	FW	(Spain)	26	2024
9	Ousmane Camara	FW	(Guinea)	25	2024
16	Brian Cipenga	FW	(Democratic Republic of the Congo)	28	2024
19	Adam Jakobsen	FW	(Denmark)	27	2025
24	Serpeta	FW	(Spain)	26	2025

=== Transfers In ===
Pos.	Player	Transferred from	Fee	Date	Source
FW	(Slovenia) David Flakus Bosilj	(Spain) Real Murcia	Loan return	30 June 2025	
GK	(Belgium) Romain Matthys	(Netherlands) MVV Maastricht	Free	1 July 2025	
MF	(Spain) Pablo Santiago	(Spain) Barakaldo	Free	1 July 2025	
MF	(Spain) Beñat Gerenabarrena	(Spain) Athletic Bilbao	Loan	1 July 2025	
DF	(Spain) Lucas Alcázar	(Spain) Betis Deportivo	Free	5 July 2025	
DF	(France) Jérémy Mellot	(Spain) Tenerife	Free	6 July 2025	
DF	(Argentina) Agustín Sienra	(Argentina) Defensa y Justicia	Free	7 July 2025	
DF	(Italy) Fabrizio Brignani	(Italy) Mantova	Undisclosed	15 July 2025	
MF	(Brazil) Ronaldo Pompeu	(Italy) Vicenza	Free	16 July 2025	
DF	(Poland) Michał Willmann	(Poland) Podbeskidzie Bielsko-Biała	Undisclosed	21 July 2025	
DF	(Spain) Tincho Conde	(Spain) Celta Fortuna	€300,000	12 August 2025	
MF	(Italy) Tommaso De Nipoti	(Italy) Atalanta U23	Loan	1 September 2025	
FW	(Denmark) Adam Jakobsen	(Sweden) IF Brommapojkarna	€2,600,000	1 September 2025	

=== Transfers Out ===
Pos.	Player	Transferred to	Fee	Date	Source
MF	(Spain) Sergio Moyita	(Spain) Real Murcia	End of contract	1 July 2025	
DF	(Paraguay) Juan Escobar	(Argentina) Godoy Cruz	End of contract	1 July 2025	
MF	(Uruguay) Giovanni Zarfino	(Spain) CD Extremadura	End of contract	1 July 2025	
MF	(Serbia) Miloš Jojić	(Bosnia and Herzegovina) Borac Banja Luka	End of contract	1 July 2025	
DF	(Netherlands) Daijiro Chirino	(Spain) Almería	€2,000,000	6 July 2025	
FW	(Spain) Jesús de Miguel	(Spain) Tenerife	Undisclosed	8 July 2025	
FW	(Spain) Pere Marco	(Spain) Unionistas	Loan	25 July 2025	
DF	(Netherlands) Jozhua Vertrouwd	(Spain) Rayo Vallecano	€1,500,000	11 August 2025	
MF	(France) Albert Lottin	(Portugal) União de Leiria	Loan	22 August 2025	
FW	(Mali) Mamadou Traoré	(Spain) Teruel	Loan	31 August 2025	
FW	(Slovenia) David Flakus Bosilj	(Spain) Real Murcia	Undisclosed	31 August 2025	
MF	(Spain) Óscar Gil	(Spain) Real Murcia	Free	15 January 2026	
FW	(United States) Nick Markanich	(United States) Houston Dynamo	Loan	20 January 2026	
MF	(Nigeria) Kenneth Mamah	(Turkey) Vanspor	Undisclosed	29 January 2026	
MF	(Spain) Serpeta	(Spain) Unionistas de Salamanca	Loan	29 January 2026	

== Friendlies ==
Castellón began their pre-season programme with an initial training camp held in Olot, Girona Province, starting on 8 July.

12 July 2025	Castellón (Spain)	6–0	(England) Queens Park Rangers	Olot
11:00	Serpeta 13'; Flakus Bosilj 33'; 37' (o.g.); Cipenga 41'; Markanich 54', 82'

19 July 2025	Valencia (Spain)	1–2	(Spain) Castellón	Paterna
20:00	Canós 47' (pen.)		Camara 21'; Cipenga 25'	Stadium: Ciudad Deportiva de Paterna

23 July 2025	Castellón (Spain)	1–1	(England) Southampton	Olot
11:00	Mamah 63'	Report	Sienra 22' (o.g.)	Stadium: Estadi Municipal d’Olot

26 July 2025	Alavés (Spain)	2–1	(Spain) Castellón	Olot
11:00	M. Díaz 58', 86'		Santiago 19'	Stadium: Estadi Municipal d’Olot

30 July 2025	Castellón (Spain)	2–0	(Saudi Arabia) Al-Riyadh	Alzira
19:00	Calatrava 5'; Flakus Bosilj 41'

2 August 2025	Huesca (Spain)	1–1	(Spain) Castellón	Teruel
19:00	Enrich 2'		Mabil 42'

8 August 2025	Levante (Spain)	0–2	(Spain) Castellón	Buñol
19:00			Markanich 34', 37'

9 August 2025	Albacete (Spain)	0–1	(Spain) Castellón	Albacete
19:30			Ruiz 61'	Stadium: Ciudad Deportiva Andrés Iniesta

== Competitions ==
=== Overall record ===
Competition	First match	Last match	Starting round	Record							
Competition	First match	Last match	Starting round	Pld	W	D	L	GF	GA	GD	Win %
Segunda División	16 August 2025	31 May 2026	Matchday 1	6	1	2	3	9	11	−2	16.67
Copa del Rey				0	0	0	0	0	0	+0	—
Total				6	1	2	3	9	11	−2	16.67

Last updated: 20 September 2025
Source: Competitions

=== Segunda División ===
==== League table ====
Pos	Team	Pld	W	D	L	GF	GA	GD	Pts	Qualification or relegation
4	Málaga (O, P)	42	21	10	11	75	52	+23	73 (Note: Málaga finished ahead of Las Palmas on head-to-head points: Málaga 2–0 Las Palmas, Las Palmas 0–1 Málaga.)	Qualification for promotion play-offs
5	Las Palmas	42	20	13	9	57	40	+17	73	Qualification for promotion play-offs
6	Castellón	42	20	12	10	70	51	+19	72 (Note: Castellón finished ahead of Burgos on head-to-head points: Castellón 3–1 Burgos, Burgos 0–0 Castellón.)	Qualification for promotion play-offs
7	Burgos	42	20	12	10	48	33	+15	72	
8	Eibar	42	19	10	13	52	40	+12	67	

Source: LaLiga Hypermotion
Rules for classification: 1) Points; 2) Head-to-head points; 3) Head-to-head goal difference; 4) Goal difference; 5) Goals scored; 6) Fair-play points
(Note: Head-to-head record is used only after all the matches between the teams in question have been played)
(O) Play-off winners; (P) Promoted

==== Results summary ====
Overall								Home						Away					
Pld	W	D	L	GF	GA	GD	Pts	W	D	L	GF	GA	GD	W	D	L	GF	GA	GD
42	20	12	10	70	51	+19	72	13	4	4	42	25	+17	7	8	6	28	26	+2

Last updated: 31 May 2026.
Source: soccerway

==== Results by round ====
Round	1	2	3	4	5	6	7	8	9	10	11	12	13	14	15	16	17	18	19	20
Ground	A	H	H	A	H	A	A	H	A	H	A	H	A	H	A	H	A	H	A	H
Result	L	L	D	L	D	W	W	W	D	L	L	W	D	W	W	W	W	W	L	W
Position	19	18	17	19	20	16	12	11	11	17	18	14	12	11	6	6	5	4	5	4

Updated to match(es) played on 3 January 2026. Source:
A = Away; H = Home; W = Win; D = Draw; L = Loss

==== Matches ====
16 August 2025 1	Racing Santander	3–1	Castellón	Santander
17:00 UTC+2	Villalibre 6'; Martín 39', 83' (pen.); Mantilla (yellow card) 61'; Martínez (yellow card) 66'; Vicente (yellow card) 90+5'	Report	Camara 45+1'; Jiménez (red card) 82'	Stadium: Campos de Sport de El Sardinero; Attendance: 21,796; Referee: Dámaso Arcediano Monescillo

22 August 2025 2	Castellón	0–1	Valladolid	Castellón de la Plana
21:30 UTC+2	Ruiz (yellow card) 36'; Mabil (yellow card) 54'; Gil (yellow card) 56'	Report	Alejo (yellow card) 29'; Meseguer (yellow card) 33'; Latasa 39'; Jurić (yellow card) 76'	Stadium: Nou Estadi Castàlia; Attendance: 11,370; Referee: Manuel Jesús Orellana

30 August 2025 3	Castellón	1–1	Zaragoza	Castellón de la Plana
21:30 UTC+2	Cipenga 59', (yellow card) 70'; Calatrava (yellow card) 67'	Report	Insua (yellow card) 20'; Sebastián (yellow card) 24'; Saidu (yellow card) 84'; Gómez 86'	Stadium: Nou Estadi Castàlia; Attendance: 12,255; Referee: Germán Cid Camacho

5 September 2025 4	Córdoba	2–1	Castellón	Córdoba
21:30 UTC+2	González (yellow card) 45+4', (goal) 49' (pen.); Carracedo (yellow card) 45+6'; Medina 73'	Report	Cipenga 19'	Stadium: Estadio Nuevo Arcángel; Referee: Jon Ander González Esteban

14 September 2025 5	Castellón	3–3	Ceuta	Castellón de la Plana
18:30 UTC+2	Brignani (yellow card) 14'; Sienra 16'; Calatrava 32'; Santiago (yellow card) 39'; Suero 90+5' (pen.); Doué (yellow card) 90+8'	Report	Fernández 3', 59', (yellow card) 83'; Caparrós (yellow card) 35'; Cantero (yellow card) 45' (yellow-red card) 69'; Matos 47'; Obeng (yellow card) 90+3'	Stadium: Nou Estadi Castàlia; Attendance: 11,801; Referee: Álvaro Moreno Aragón

20 September 2025 6	Cultural Leonesa	1–3	Castellón	León
16:15 UTC+2	Ojeda (yellow card) 57'; Justo 64', (yellow card) 87'; Calero (red card) 90+2'	Report	Calatrava 8'; Barri 11', (yellow card) 48'; Jakobsen (yellow card) 23'; Alcázar (yellow card) 33'; Ronaldo (yellow card) 55'; Mamah 82'; Matthys (yellow card) 90+1'; Jiménez (yellow card) 90+3'	Stadium: Estadio Reino de León; Attendance: 9,068; Referee: Marta Huerta de Aza

29 September 2025 7	Leganés	0–1	Castellón	Leganés
20:30 UTC+2		Report		Stadium: Butarque Stadium

5 October 2025 8	Castellón	3–1	Sporting Gijón	Castellón de la Plana
16:15 CET	Jakobsen 9'; Calatrava 43' (pen.); Ruiz (yellow card) 47'; Alcázar (yellow card) 70'; Camara 88'; Tincho Conde (yellow card) 90+2'	Report	Dubasin 10'; Campos (yellow card) 57'; Corredera (yellow card) 60'; Kembo (yellow card) 65'; Cortés (yellow card) 77'; Vázquez (yellow card) 82'; Snith (yellow card) 90+1'	Stadium: Nou Estadi Castàlia; Attendance: 11,711; Referee: (Spain) José Sánchez Villalobos

12 October 2025 9	Eibar	0–0	Castellón	Eibar
16:15 CET	Rodríguez (yellow card) 45'	Report	Mamah (yellow card) 45'; Ronaldo (yellow card) 58'; Doué (yellow card) 63'; De Nipoti (yellow card) 90+5'	Stadium: Ipurua Municipal Stadium; Attendance: 4,950; Referee: (Spain) Alejandro Morilla Turrión

19 October 2025 10	Castellón	0–1	Albacete	Castellón de la Plana
16:15 CET	Ruiz (yellow card) 30'; Ronaldo (yellow card) 40' (yellow-red card) 57'; Alcázar (yellow card) 63'; Jiménez (red card) 90'; De Nipoti (yellow card) 90+7'	Report	Medina 5' (yellow card) 90+8'; Pepe (yellow card) 21'; Gámez (yellow card) 57'; Marín (red card) 90'	Stadium: Nou Estadi Castàlia; Attendance: 12,269; Referee: (Spain) Alfonso De Ena Wolf

26 October 2025 11	Almería	1–0	Castellón	Almería
				Stadium: UD Almería Stadium

2 November 2025 12	Castellón	2–1	Málaga	Castellón de la Plana
18:30 CET	Brignani (yellow card) 23'; Mellot (yellow card) 46'; Ruiz (yellow card) 62'; Doué (yellow card) 87' (yellow-red card) 90+10' (goal) 90+9'; Sienra (yellow card) 88'; Camara 90+2'		Rafita (yellow card) 45+1'; Jauregi 57' (pen.); Javi Montero (yellow card) 66'; Dani Lorenzo (yellow card) 76'	Stadium: Nou Estadi Castàlia; Attendance: 11,345; Referee: (Spain) Dámaso Arcediano Monescillo

10 November 2025 13	Burgos	0–0	Castellón	Burgos
20:30 CET	David González (yellow card) 27'; Córdoba (yellow card) 30'	Report	Israel Suero (yellow card) 1'; Jiménez (yellow card) 16'	Stadium: Estadio El Plantío; Attendance: 9,152; Referee: (Spain) Carlos Muñiz Muñoz

15 November 2025 14	Castellón	5–4	Real Sociedad B	Castellón de la Plana
16:00 CET	Awer Mabil 25'; Israel Suero (yellow card) 35' (goal) 51'; Adam Jakobsen 50'; Calatrava 59'; Aurélio 83' (pen.) (yellow card) 90+1'; De Nipoti (yellow card) 90+7'	Report	Carrera 29'; Jon Balda (yellow card) 36'; Dani Díaz 64'; Osazuwa 89'; Peru Rodríguez 90+4'	Stadium: Nou Estadi Castàlia; Attendance: 10,344; Referee: (Spain) Alejandro Ojaos Valera

22 November 2025 15	Andorra	1–3	Castellón	Encamp
				Stadium: Nou Estadi a Encamp

30 November 2025 16	Castellón	1–0	Las Palmas

7 December 2025 17	Deportivo de La Coruña	1–3	Castellón

15 December 2025 18	Castellón	3–1	Mirandés

21 December 2025 19	Cádiz	2–0	Castellón

3 January 2026 20	Castellón	4–1	Huesca

11 January 2026 21	Granada	0–0	Castellón

16 January 2026 22	Castellón	2–0	Leganés

25 January 2026 23	Zaragoza	0–0	Castellón

1 February 2026 24	Castellón	2–0	Andorra

8 February 2026 25	Valladolid	0–4	Castellón

15 February 2026 26	Castellón	2–0	Deportivo de La Coruña

21 February 2026 27	Las Palmas	1–1	Castellón

28 February 2026 28	Castellón	1–3	Racing Santander

7 March 2026 29	Real Sociedad B	4–2	Castellón

15 March 2026 30	Sporting Gijón	4–1	Castellón

23 March 2026 31	Castellón	1–1	Cultural Leonesa

28 March 2026 32	Albacete	1–1	Castellón

2 April 2026 33	Castellón	2–0	Almería

6 April 2026 34	Castellón	3–2	Granada

12 April 2026 35	Mirandés	2–2	Castellón

18 April 2026 36	Castellón	3–1	Burgos

25 April 2026 37	Málaga	2–3	Castellón

2 May 2026 38	Castellón	1–2	Córdoba

9 May 2026 39	Ceuta	1–1	Castellón

15 May 2026 40	Castellón	1–1	Cádiz

24 May 2026 41	Huesca	0–1	Castellón

31 May 2026 42	Castellón	2–1	Eibar

==== Promotion play-offs ====
6 June 2026 First leg	Castellón	v	Almería	Castellón de la Plana
21:00				Stadium: Nou Estadi Castàlia

=== Copa del Rey ===
30 October 2025 First round	CA Antoniano	1–0	Castellón	Lebrija
21:00	Serrano 82'			Stadium: Estadio Municipal

== Statistics ==
Rank	Pos.	Player	LaLiga 2	Copa del Rey	Total
1	MF	(Spain) Álex Calatrava	2	0	2
1	MF	(Democratic Republic of the Congo) Brian Cipenga	2	0	2
3	MF	(Spain) Diego Barri	1	0	1
3	FW	(Guinea) Ousmane Camara	1	0	1
3	MF	(Nigeria) Kenneth Mamah	1	0	1
3	MF	(Spain) Israel Suero	1	0	1
3	DF	(Argentina) Agustín Sienra	1	0	1
