= 2024–25 CD Castellón season =

CD Castellón
2024–25 season
- Head coach: Dick Schreuder
- Stadium: Nou Estadi Castàlia
- Segunda División: 13th
- Copa del Rey: First round
- Average home league attendance: 10,914
Home colours	Away colours	Third colours

The 2024–25 season is the 103rd season in the history of the CD Castellón, and the club's first season in the Segunda División since 2021. In addition to the domestic league, the team is scheduled to participate in the Copa del Rey.

== Transfers ==
=== In ===
Pos.	Player	Transferred from	Fee	Date	Source
MF	(Netherlands) Mats Seuntjens	(Netherlands) RKC Waalwijk	Free	15 July 2024	
GK	(Iran) Amir Abedzadeh	(Portugal) Marítimo	Free	16 July 2024	
MF	(Netherlands) Thomas van den Belt	(Netherlands) Feyenoord	Loan	1 August 2024	

=== Out ===
Pos.	Player	Transferred to	Fee	Date	Source
MF	(Netherlands) Mats Seuntjens	(Netherlands) FC Groningen	Contract terminated	3 January 2025	

== Friendlies ==
=== Pre-season ===
17 July 2024 Friendly	Levante	1–0	Castellón	Buñol
19:00	Brugué 24'			Stadium: Ciudad Deportiva de Buñol - Campo 1

26 July 2024 Friendly	Castellón	2–0	Al-Wakrah
10:30	Jiménez 82'; Calatrava 83'

31 July 2024 Friendly	Elche	0–6	Castellón	San Pedro del Pinatar
19:00				Referee: Martínez Montalbán

== Competitions ==
=== Overall record ===
Competition	First match	Last match	Starting round	Record							
Competition	First match	Last match	Starting round	Pld	W	D	L	GF	GA	GD	Win %
Segunda División	16–19 August 2024	1 June 2025	Matchday 1	6	2	1	3	8	7	+1	33.33
Copa del Rey				0	0	0	0	0	0	+0	—
Total				6	2	1	3	8	7	+1	33.33

Last updated: 22 September 2024
Source: Soccerway

=== Segunda División ===
==== League table ====
Pos	Team	Pld	W	D	L	GF	GA	GD	Pts	Qualification or relegation
15	Deportivo La Coruña	42	13	14	15	56	54	+2	53 (Note: Deportivo La Coruña finished ahead of Málaga and Castellón on head-to-head points: Deportivo La Coruña 6 pts, Málaga 5 pts, Castellón 4 pts.)	
16	Málaga	42	12	17	13	42	46	−4	53	
17	Castellón	42	14	11	17	65	63	+2	53	
18	Zaragoza	42	13	12	17	56	63	−7	51	
19	Eldense (R)	42	11	12	19	44	63	−19	45	Relegation to Primera Federación

Source: LaLiga Hypermotion
Rules for classification: 1) Points; 2) Head-to-head points; 3) Head-to-head goal difference; 4) Goal difference; 5) Goals scored; 6) Fair-play points
(Note: Head-to-head record is used only after all the matches between the teams in question have been played)
(R) Relegated

==== Results summary ====
Overall								Home						Away					
Pld	W	D	L	GF	GA	GD	Pts	W	D	L	GF	GA	GD	W	D	L	GF	GA	GD
11	5	1	5	18	15	+3	16	2	1	3	7	8	−1	3	0	2	11	7	+4

==== Results by round ====
Round	1	2	3	4	5	6	7	8	9	10	11
Ground	A	H	A	H	A	H	H	A	A	H	H
Result	L	D	W	L	W	L	W	W	L	W	L
Position	17	17	10	14	9	13	10	6	10	5	10
Points	0	1	4	4	7	7	10	13	13	16	16

A = Away; H = Home; W = Win; D = Draw; L = Loss

==== Matches ====
The match schedule was released on 26 June 2024.

17 August 2024 1	Eibar	1–0	Castellón	Eibar
17:00	Bautista 2'; Arbilla (yellow card) 15'; Guruzeta (yellow card) 25'; Merquelanz (yellow card) 54'; Nolaskoain (yellow card) 78'	Report	Alberto (yellow card) 81'	Stadium: Ipurua; Attendance: 3,538; Referee: Eder Mallo Fernández

25 August 2024 2	Castellón	0–0	Oviedo	Castellón de la Plana
21:30		Report	Sibo (yellow card) 57'; Paulino (yellow card) 90'	Stadium: Castalia; Attendance: 13,709; Referee: Jon Ander González Esteban

1 September 2024 3	Burgos	0–2	Castellón	Burgos
17:00		Report	Moyita (yellow card) 16'; Douglas 64'; Calatrava 69'	Stadium: El Plantío; Attendance: 9,105; Referee: Álvaro Moreno Aragón

9 September 2024 4	Castellón	1–3	Cádiz	Castellón de la Plana
21:00	Gil (yellow card) 84'; Suero 90+3' (pen.); Moyita (yellow card) 90+5'	Report	Chris Ramos 49', 56'; Alcaraz 53' (pen.); San Emeterio (yellow card) 90+2'	Stadium: Castalia; Attendance: 13,218; Referee: Miguel Sesma Espinosa

16 September 2024 5	Almería	2–5	Castellón	Almería
20:30	Melamed 72'; Suárez 81' (pen.)	Report	Gil (yellow card) 17'; Vertrouwd (yellow card) 40'; Sánchez 43'; van den Belt 62', (yellow card) 85'; Chirino (yellow card) 66'; de Miguel 69', 82'; Suero 76'	Stadium: UD Almería Stadium; Attendance: 11,952; Referee: Miguel González Díaz

22 September 2024 6	Castellón	0–1	Racing Santander	Castellón de la Plana
16:15	Moyita (yellow card) 45+2'	Report	Michelin (yellow card) 8'; Martín 48' (pen.); Aldasoro (yellow card) 86'	Stadium: Castalia; Attendance: 12,022; Referee: Manuel Jesús Orellana Cid

29 September 2024 7	Castellón	2–1	Tenerife	Castellón de la Plana
16:15	Sánchez 20'; van den Belt (yellow card) 61'; Willems (yellow card) 71'	Report	Salvi (yellow card) 52'; Ángel 63'; González (yellow card) 66'	Stadium: Castalia; Attendance: 11,439; Referee: Eder Mallo Fernández

6 October 2024 8	Eldense	2–3	Castellón	Elda
16:15	Ortuño 18'; Đumić 25'; Gámez (yellow card) 49'; Piña (yellow card) 90+5'	Report	Mamah 13', 38'; de Miguel 42'; Sánchez (yellow card) 90+7'	Stadium: Nuevo Pepico Amat; Attendance: 5,167; Referee: Jon Ander González Esteban

14 October 2024 9	Sporting Gijón	2–1	Castellón	Gijón
20:30	Gelabert (yellow card) 19'; Méndez 62'; D. Sánchez 87'; Dubasin (yellow card) 89'; Otero (yellow card) 90+3'	Report	Willems (yellow card) 2'; Mamah 21'; R. Sánchez (yellow card) 55'	Stadium: El Molinón; Attendance: 19,940; Referee: Óliver de la Fuente Ramos

19 October 2024 10	Castellón	2–0	Levante	Castellón de la Plana
18:30	Sánchez 53', 77'; Calatrava (yellow card) 62'; Chirino (yellow card) 75'	Report	Navarro (yellow card) 73'; Rey (yellow card) 90+3'; Fabrício (yellow card) 90+4'	Stadium: Castalia; Attendance: 12,905; Referee: José Antonio Sánchez Villalobos

22 October 2024 11	Castellón	2–3	Granada	Castellón de la Plana
21:00	Suero 33', 35'; Sánchez (yellow card) 57'; Calatrava (yellow card) 68'	Report	Reinier 26', (yellow card) 42'; Brau (yellow card) 45+3', (goal) 49'; Miquel (yellow card) 57' (yellow-red card) 90+6'; Williams (yellow card) 90+1'; Rubio (yellow card) 90+1'; Uzuni 90+3' (pen.)	Stadium: Castalia; Attendance: 9,431; Referee: Marta Huerta de Aza
