= Pere Marco =

Spanish footballer (born 2003)

Personal information
- Full name: Pere Marco Suñer
- Date of birth: 16 September 2003 (age 23)
- Place of birth: Gandia, Spain
- Height: 1.78 m (5 ft 10 in)
- Position: Forward

Team information
- Current team: Gimnàstic

Youth career
- Gandía
- Levante
- Dénia
- 2020–2021: San Marcelino
- 2021–2022: Gandía

Senior career*
Years	Team	Apps	(Gls)
2022–2023	Gandía	33	(8)
2023–2024	Júpiter Leonés	34	(6)
2024–2025	Castellón B	4	(3)
2024–2026	Castellón	6	(1)
2025	→ Marbella (loan)	6	(1)
2025–2026	→ Unionistas (loan)	30	(5)
2026–	Gimnàstic	0	(0)
- * Club domestic league appearances and goals as of 9 June 2026

Pere Marco Suñer (born 16 September 2003) is a Spanish professional footballer who plays as a forward for Gimnàstic de Tarragona.

== Career ==
Born in Gandia, Valencian Community, Marco began his career with hometown side CF Gandía, and had an eight-year spell at Levante UD before representing CD Dénia and CDA San Marcelino before returning to his first club in 2021. He made his senior debut on 26 February 2022, coming on as a late substitute and scoring Gandía's second in a 2–1 Regional Preferente away win over Racing Algemesí CF.

Marco renewed his contract with Gandía on 11 May 2022, and also scored two further goals as the club achieved promotion to Tercera Federación. On 24 July of the following year, he joined Cultural y Deportiva Leonesa and was assigned to farm team Júpiter Leonés also in the fifth division.

On 18 July 2024, Marco agreed to a deal with CD Castellón, being initially assigned to the reserves in the same category. He made his professional debut with the Orelluts on 17 August, replacing Alberto Jiménez late into a 1–0 Segunda División away loss to SD Eibar, and scored his first professional goal on 14 December, netting his side's third in a 4–1 home routing of FC Cartagena.

On 3 February 2025, Marco renewed his contract until 2026 and was immediately loaned to Primera Federación side Marbella FC for the remainder of the season. On 25 July, he moved to fellow league team Unionistas de Salamanca CF also in a temporary deal.

On 16 June 2026, Marco agreed to a two-year deal with Gimnàstic de Tarragona also in division three.
