= Awer Mabil =

Australian soccer player (born 1995)

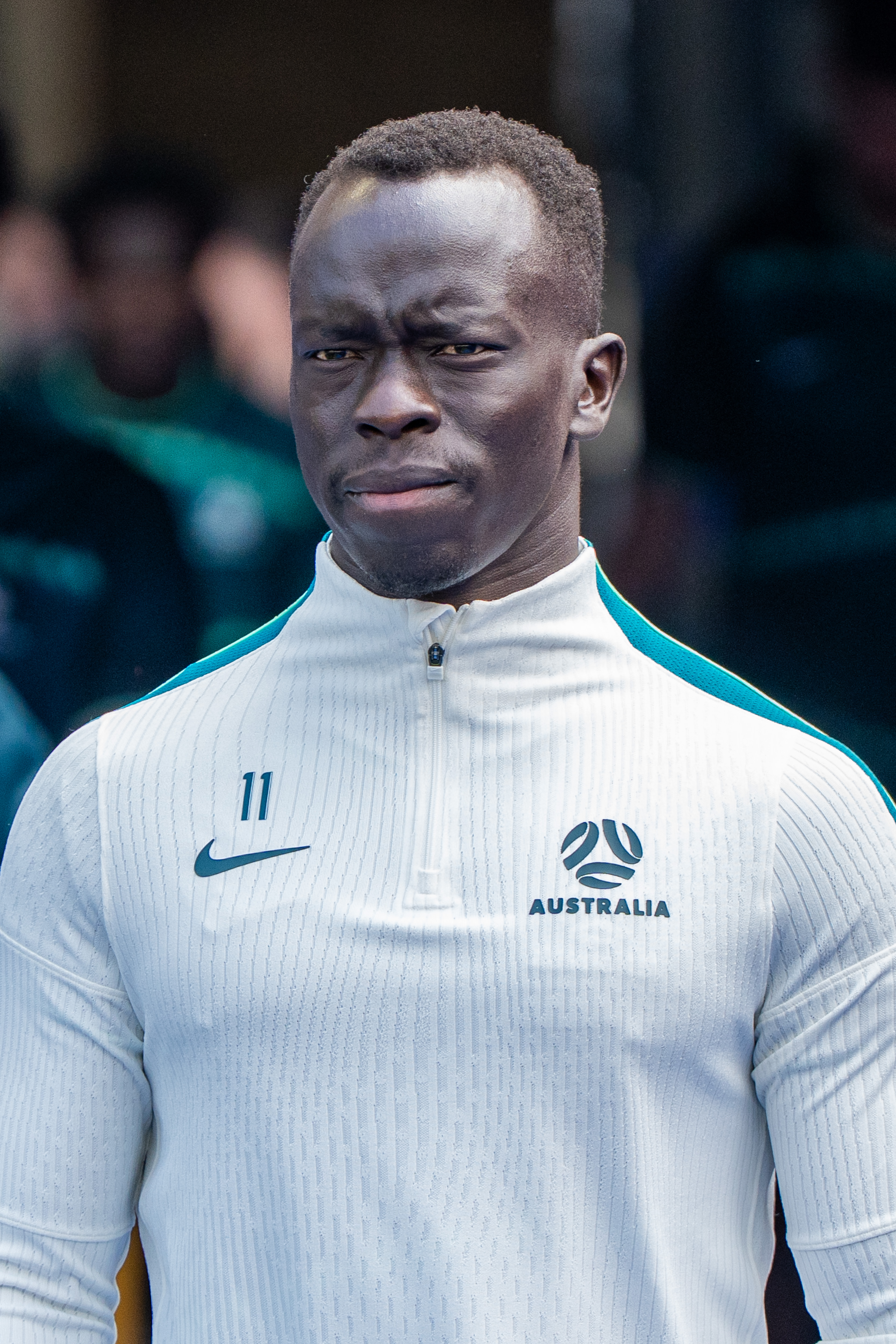
- Mabil with Australia in 2026

Personal information
- Full name: Awer Bul Mabil
- Date of birth: 15 September 1995 (age 31)
- Place of birth: Kakuma, Kenya
- Height: 1.78 m (5 ft 10 in)
- Position: Winger

Team information
- Current team: Melbourne City
- Number: 11

Youth career
- St Augustines
- Playford City
- Salisbury East Junior Soccer Club
- 2010–2011: SA NTC
- 2012–2015: Adelaide United

Senior career*
Years	Team	Apps	(Gls)
2012	Campbelltown City	14	(1)
2013–2015	Adelaide United	47	(8)
2015–2022	Midtjylland	108	(16)
2016–2017	→ Esbjerg fB (loan)	25	(4)
2017–2018	→ Paços de Ferreira (loan)	26	(2)
2022	→ Kasımpaşa (loan)	11	(2)
2022–2023	Cádiz	5	(0)
2023	→ Sparta Prague (loan)	14	(2)
2023–2025	Grasshoppers	28	(5)
2025–2026	Castellón	44	(3)
2026–	Melbourne City	0	(0)

International career^{‡}
2014–2015	Australia U20	9	(4)
2015	Australia U23	6	(0)
2018–	Australia	39	(10)
- * Club domestic league appearances and goals as of 30 June 2026 ‡ National team caps and goals as of 3 July 2026

Awer Bul Mabil (born 15 September 1995) is an Australian professional soccer player who plays as a winger for A-League Men club Melbourne City. Born in a Kenya refugee camp to South Sudanese parents, he plays for the Australia national team.

Mabil played youth soccer at the South Australian National Training Centre and with Adelaide United. He made his senior debut for Campbelltown City, before making his debut in the A-League for Adelaide United in 2013.

He is co-founder of the humanitarian charity Barefoot to Boots, which aims to improve health, education, and gender equality among refugees, as well as equipping young refugees with sports equipment. In January 2023 he was named Young Australian of the Year.

== Early life and education ==
Mabil was born on 15 September 1995 to South Sudanese parents in Kakuma, located in northwestern Kenya. He lived with his family in the Kakuma Refugee Camp until the age of 10 when they moved to Australia and settled in Adelaide. He first began playing football at the Kenyan refugee camp at around the age of five, stating: "We would just go outside and start kicking around. It was not structured and there was little else to do". They played with bare feet and used a rolled-up sock as a football. During a 2022 World Cup qualifier, Mabil said "I was born in a hut, a little hut. My hotel room here is definitely bigger than the hut, the room we had as a family in that refugee camp".

Mabil attended St Columba College throughout his teenage years in Adelaide, graduating in 2013.

== Club career ==
=== Youth ===
Mabil played in youth teams at St Augustines; Playford City; SA NTC (2010–2011); and Salisbury East Junior Soccer Club.

=== Adelaide United ===
Mabil made his senior debut at Campbelltown City (in the FFSA National Premier League) in 2012. Later that year he was signed by Adelaide United in the A-League, after he had displayed a number of performances showing his pace and dribbling skills to outwit many defenders in the FFSA National Premier League.

He made his Adelaide United senior debut on 11 January 2013 in a 2012–13 A-League match against Perth Glory. He scored his first goal in a 2–1 away loss to Wellington Phoenix in Round 17 of the 2013–14 A-League season, after coming on as a substitute in the second half.

=== FC Midtjylland ===
In July 2015, Mabil secured a move to Danish Superliga club, FC Midtjylland for a reported transfer fee in excess of AU$1,300,000 Awer Mabil made his Danish Superliga debut for FC Midtjylland on 16 October 2015 against Randers FC at the MCH Arena in Herning as an 83rd-minute substitute for Daniel Royer. On 22 October 2015, Mabil made his UEFA Europa League debut at home to Napoli FC, coming on for Mikkel Duelund in the 73rd minute.

He has said that when he went to FC Midtjylland he began to appreciate the seriousness of the game, and to develop a winning mentality. Initially he was not getting much game time, and the club sent him to two clubs on loan to help develop his skills and a winning mindset.

==== Loan to Esbjerg fB ====
In August 2016, Mabil was loaned to Esbjerg fB to allow him to get more game time and develop. Mabil made his debut on 8 August 2016, starting the match against AGF but was sent off in the 44th minute. Esbjerg was relegated to the Danish 1st Division, and Esbjerg announced that Mabil was one of nine players who would be leaving the club.

==== Loan to Paços de Ferreira ====
In July 2017, Mabil was loaned to Portuguese club Paços de Ferreira to allow him further first-team opportunities. Paços de Ferreira were relegated at the end of the 2017–18 Primeira Liga season; however, Mabil impressed while on loan, scoring twice and providing a further three assists in 26 league appearances. He still follows the club.

==== Return to Midtjylland ====
Mabil returned to Denmark in 2018 a more mature player, and had a strong start, scoring a goal and registering two assists in his first six appearances of the season. On 11 November 2018, Mabil scored two and set a further two up in Midtjyllands 5–0 win over Vejle, taking his season tally to four goals and eight assists. He worked his way into the first team squad.

On 30 September 2020, he assisted Sory Kaba's headed goal with a cross in a 4–1 home win over Slavia Prague in the 2020–21 UEFA Champions League play-off round that qualified Midtjylland for their first UEFA Champions League. He scored his first Champions League goal on 25 November that year against Ajax from the penalty spot in a 3–1 defeat.

==== Loan to Kasımpaşa ====
In February 2022, after being sidelined at Midtjylland owing to his unwillingness to sign a further contract after seven years in Denmark, Mabil was loaned to Kasımpaşa in Turkey until the end of the season.

=== Cádiz ===
In May 2022, it was confirmed that Mabil had signed to Spanish La Liga club Cádiz for four seasons. However in his first half season for the Andalusian club he only made six appearances, averaging merely 40 minutes of playing time per game.

==== Loan to Sparta Prague ====
In January 2023, Mabil was loaned to Sparta Prague in the Czech Republic. He made a total of 14 appearances for Sparta, scoring two goals and assisting for three, contributing to Sparta becoming Czech champions.

=== Grasshoppers ===
On 21 August 2023, Mabil joined Swiss record champions Grasshopper Club Zürich on a two-year contract with an option to extend for a further year. He made his debut for the club on 2 September, replacing Dorian Babunski at half-time in a 2–1 away loss to Stade Lausanne Ouchy. On 7 October 2023, he made his first start for the club, scoring the first two goals and assisting for the third in a 3–0 away win against Yverdon-Sport. He was named the Man of the Match for the performance. On 9 December 2023, during an away game against FC Basel he pulled his hamstring, requiring surgery and sidelining him for nearly four months. As a result, he managed just 21 appearances in his first season in Switzerland, but still provided eight goal contributions (four goals and four assists).

On 18 August 2024, he contributed to eight of the nine goals in a 9–0 win over FC Regensdorf in the 2024–25 Swiss Cup, scoring a hattrick and assisting for five goals. He scored the team's only goal in a 2–1 defeat in the Zurich Derby on 19 October 2024. On 26 October 2024, an error by Mabil led to the Grasshoppers conceding in just the second minute of their league game away against FC Lausanne-Sport. The team went on to lose the game 3–0. This would be his final game for the Grasshoppers, as his contract was terminated by mutual consent on 7 January 2025.

=== Castellón ===
On 5 February 2025, Mabil returned to Spain, signing a contract with Segunda División club CD Castellón until 30 June 2026.

=== Melbourne City ===
On 6 August 2026, Mabil returned to Australia, joining A-League Men club Melbourne City on a three-year deal.

== International career ==
In August 2013, Mabil was called up by Australia for COTIF Tournament in L'Alcúdia, Spain. The tournament was used by the FIFA to prepare players for their successful 2014 AFC U-19 Championship qualification campaign.

A citizen of South Sudan by birth, he was cleared by FIFA to play for Australia in March 2014 after a year-long process to obtain a birth certificate and gain exemption from FIFA eligibility rules due to his refugee status.

He featured for Australia in the 2014 AFC U-19 Championship, playing in all three of their games; the opponents were Uzbekistan, United Arab Emirates and Indonesia.

After showing impressive form with FC Midtjylland, Mabil was called up to the senior team for the first time. Participating in the Socceroos first training camp under new coach Graham Arnold.

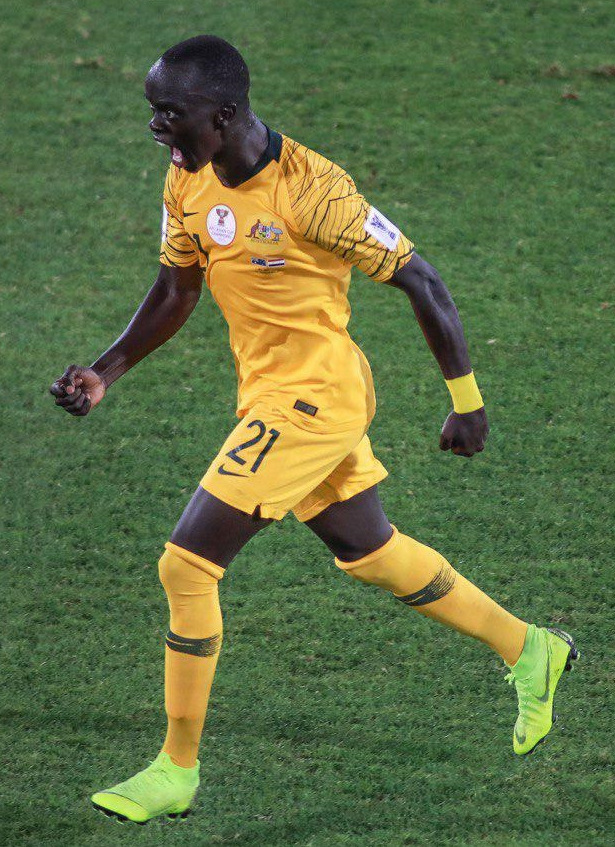
Mabil playing for Australia in 2019

On 16 October 2018, Mabil made his debut for the Australia senior national team against Kuwait in an international friendly match at the Al Kuwait Sports Club Stadium. He came on as a second-half substitution for Mathew Leckie and scored his maiden goal for the senior national team in the 88th minute to give Australia their fourth and final goal in a 4–0 win over Kuwait in Graham Arnold's first match of his second stint with the Australian national team. Mabil's goal was assisted by Tomi Juric and Thomas Deng. Mabil celebrated the goal with childhood friend and fellow South Sudanese refugee Deng, who was also making his international debut for Australia. Awer dedicated the goal, post-match, to his mother.

Mabil played in qualifying matches for the 2022 World Cup. In the final "must-win" game against Peru, he scored one of the penalties that secured a place in the competition for the Socceroos. He said that scoring the crucial goal was "the only way to say thank you to Australia on behalf of my family".

On 22 September 2022, Mabil scored his first home international goal against New Zealand in a 1–0 win in a friendly at Lang Park.

On 31 May 2026, Mabil was selected in the 26-man squad for the 2026 FIFA World Cup.

== Other activities ==
=== Barefoot to Boots ===
Mabil helped to establish the humanitarian charity Barefoot to Boots with his elder brother Awer G. Bul, and Ian Smith to ensure better "health, education, and gender equality" outcomes for refugees. Mabil returned to Kakuma with the organisation, with the aim of promoting football as well as helping refugees in other ways.

== Recognition and honours ==
In 2018, Mabil was awarded the FIFPRO Merit Award, presented by the International Federation of Professional Footballers at a ceremony in Rome. The award is worth US$25,000, to be donated to his charity to continue his work.

In June 2022, on a visit to his old school, St Columba College, Mabil was presented with the 2022 Alumni of the Year Award, in recognition of his high level of achievement in football as well as his service to the community with his Barefoot to Boots charity.

In November 2022, Mabil was announced as recipient of the 2023 Young Australian of the Year award for his home state of South Australia. On 25 January 2023, he was named the national Young Australian of the Year.

== Personal life ==
Mabil's elder brother is Awer G. Bul, director of Barefoot to Boots, which he co-founded. His 19-year-old sister Bor was killed in a car crash in Adelaide in 2018.

He went to school with fellow refugee and Socceroo Thomas Deng.

In July 2026 Mabil's blunt response ("That's bullshit") to politician Pauline Hanson's suggestion that Australian society should be a "monoculture" attracted media attention.

== Career statistics ==
=== Club ===
As of 16 May 2026

Appearances and goals by club, season and competition
Club	Season	League			Cup (Note: Includes Australian FFA Cup, Danish Sydbank Pokalen, Portuguese Taça de Portugal, Turkish Cup, and Czech Cup.)		Continental		Other		Total	
Club	Season	Division	Apps	Goals	Apps	Goals	Apps	Goals	Apps	Goals	Apps	Goals
Adelaide United	2012–13	A-League	5	0	—		—		—		5	0
Adelaide United	2013–14	A-League	20	2	—		—		1 (Note: Appearances in finals series)	0	21	2
Adelaide United	2014–15	A-League	19	5	3	1	—		2	1	24	7
Adelaide United	Total		44	7	3	1	—		3	1	50	9
FC Midtjylland	2015–16	Superliga	6	0	1	0	2	0	—		9	0
FC Midtjylland	2018–19	Superliga	30	6	1	0	5 (Note: Includes four appearances in the Europa League third qualification and play-off rounds and one appearance in the Champions League second qualification round)	0	—		36	6
FC Midtjylland	2019–20	Superliga	34	8	0	0	2 (Note: Appearances in the Europa League)	0	—		36	8
FC Midtjylland	2020–21	Superliga	21	1	3	0	10 (Note: Appearances in the Champions League)	2	—		34	3
FC Midtjylland	2021–22	Superliga	3	1	0	0	3	1	—		6	2
FC Midtjylland	Total		94	16	5	0	22	3	—		121	19
Esbjerg fB (loan)	2016–17	Superliga	25	4	0	0	—		4 (Note: Appearances in Superliga relegation play-offs)	0	29	4
Paços de Ferreira (loan)	2017–18	Primeira Liga	26	2	—		—		3 (Note: Appearances in the Portuguese Taça da Liga)	1	29	3
Kasımpaşa (loan)	2021–22	Süper Lig	11	2	0	0	—		—		11	2
Cádiz	2022–23	La Liga	5	0	1	0	—		—		6	0
Sparta Prague (loan)	2022–23	Czech First League	14	2	2	0	—		—		16	2
Grasshoppers	2023–24	Super League	19	4	1	0	—		2 (Note: Appearances in the relegation play-off)	0	22	4
Grasshoppers	2024–25	Super League	9	1	1	3	—		—		10	4
CD Castellón	2024–25	Segunda División	14	0	0	0	—		—		14	0
CD Castellón	2025–26	Segunda División	30	3	1	0	—		—		30	3
CD Castellón	Total		72	8	3	3	0	0	2	0	76	11
Melbourne City	2026–27	A-League Men	0	0	0	0	—		0	0	0	0
Career total			224	35	11	1	22	3	10	2	272	41

=== International ===
As of match played 3 July 2026

Appearances and goals by national team and year
National team	Year	Apps	Goals
Australia	2018	4	2
Australia	2019	10	2
Australia	2020	0	0
Australia	2021	9	2
Australia	2022	8	2
Australia	2023	2	1
Australia	2024	2	0
Australia	2025	0	0
Australia	2026	4	1
Total		39	10

As of match played 21 September 2022
Scores and results list Australia's goal tally first, score column indicates score after each Mabil goal.

List of international goals scored by Awer Mabil
No.	Date	Venue	Cap	Opponent	Score	Result	Competition
1	16 October 2018	Al Kuwait Sports Club Stadium, Kuwait City, Kuwait	1	Kuwait	4–0	4–0	Friendly
2	30 December 2018	Maktoum bin Rashid Al Maktoum Stadium, Dubai, United Arab Emirates	4	Oman	3–0	5–0	Friendly
3	11 January 2019	Rashid Stadium, Dubai, United Arab Emirates	6	Palestine	2–0	3–0	2019 AFC Asian Cup
4	15 January 2019	Khalifa bin Zayed Stadium, Al Ain, United Arab Emirates	7	Syria	1–0	3–2	2019 AFC Asian Cup
5	2 September 2021	Khalifa International Stadium, Doha, Qatar	17	China	1–0	3–0	2022 FIFA World Cup qualification
6	7 October 2021	Khalifa International Stadium, Doha, Qatar	19	Oman	1–0	3–1	2022 FIFA World Cup qualification
7	1 June 2022	Al Janoub Stadium, Al-Wakrah, Qatar	26	Jordan	2–1	2–1	Friendly
8	22 September 2022	Suncorp Stadium, Brisbane, Australia	29	New Zealand	1–0	1–0	Friendly
9	24 March 2023	Western Sydney Stadium, Sydney, Australia	32	Ecuador	2–1	3–1	Friendly
10	31 March 2026	Melbourne Rectangular Stadium, Melbourne, Australia	37	Curaçao	1–0	5–1	2026 FIFA Series

== Honours ==
Adelaide United

- FFA Cup: 2014

Midtjylland

- Danish Superliga: 2019–20
- Danish Cup: 2018–19

Sparta Prague

- Czech First League: 2022–23

Individual

- National Youth League Player of the Year: 2012–13
- FFA U20 Male Player of the Year: 2014
- Young Australian of the Year: 2023
