= Pablo Santiago =

Pablo Santiago is the name of:

- Pablo Santiago (footballer), a Spanish association football player
- Pablo Santiago (director), Filipino film director, producer and screenwriter
