= Ismael Fadel =

Moroccan footballer (born 2007)

Personal information
- Full name: Ismael Fadel Pagés
- Date of birth: 10 March 2004 (age 22)
- Place of birth: Zaragoza, Spain
- Height: 1.90 m (6 ft 3 in)
- Position: Centre-back

Team information
- Current team: Ibiza (on loan from Castellón)

Youth career
- Amistad
- Zaragoza

Senior career*
Years	Team	Apps	(Gls)
2023–2025	Zaragoza B	0	(0)
2023–2025	→ Ejea (loan)	59	(4)
2025–2026	Yeclano	17	(0)
2026	Castellón B	12	(2)
2026–	Castellón	3	(0)
2026–	→ Ibiza (loan)	0	(0)

International career
2020	Morocco U17		
- * Club domestic league appearances and goals as of 30 June 2026

Ismael Fadel Pagés (born 10 March 2004) is a professional footballer who plays as a centre-back for Spanish club UD Ibiza, on loan from CD Castellón. Born in Spain, he represented Morocco at youth level.

== Club career ==
Born in Zaragoza, Aragon to Moroccan parents, Fadel represented UD Amistad and Real Zaragoza as a youth. On 12 August 2023, after finishing his formation, he was loaned to Tercera Federación side SD Ejea for the season.

On 30 August 2024, after helping Ejea to achieve promotion to Segunda Federación, Fadel's loan was extended for a further year. On 1 July of the following year, he moved to fellow league team Yeclano Deportivo on a permanent deal.

On 16 January 2026, Fadel signed for CD Castellón in Segunda División. Initially a member of the reserves also in the fourth tier, he made his professional debut on 8 February, starting in a 4–0 away routing of Real Valladolid.

On 7 July 2026, Fadel was loaned to Primera Federación side UD Ibiza, for one year.

== International career ==
In 2020, Fadel played for the Morocco national under-17 team.
