= Álex Calatrava =

Álex Calatrava may refer to:

- Álex Calatrava (tennis)
- Álex Calatrava (footballer)
