= Ronaldo Pompeu =

Brazilian footballer

Personal information
- Full name: Ronaldo Pompeu da Silva
- Date of birth: 8 April 1990 (age 36)
- Place of birth: Caxambu do Sul, Brazil
- Height: 1.78 m (5 ft 10 in)
- Position: Defensive midfielder

Team information
- Current team: Mestre

Youth career
- 2007–2009: Mantova

Senior career*
Years	Team	Apps	(Gls)
2009–2010	Mantova	10	(0)
2010–2011	Padova	11	(1)
2011–2013	Grosseto	30	(0)
2013–2016	Empoli	8	(0)
2013	→ Catanzaro (loan)	13	(0)
2014–2015	→ Pro Vercelli (loan)	16	(3)
2016–2017	Lazio	0	(0)
2016	→ Salernitana (loan)	9	(0)
2016–2017	→ Salernitana (loan)	31	(1)
2017–2019	Novara	57	(14)
2019–2022	Padova	85	(20)
2022–2025	Vicenza	77	(8)
2025–2026	Castellón	16	(1)
2026–	Mestre	0	(0)
- * Club domestic league appearances and goals as of 6 November 2026

Ronaldo Pompeu da Silva (born 8 April 1990), sometimes known as just Ronaldo, is a Brazilian footballer who plays as a defensive midfielder for Italian Serie D club Mestre. He also holds Italian passport.

== Career ==
Born in Caxambu do Sul, Santa Catarina, Ronaldo moved to Italy at early age, and came through the youth ranks of Mantova. He made his first team debut on 27 March 2010, coming on as a second-half substitute for Stefano Mondini in a 1–0 Serie B home win over Vicenza.

Ronaldo left Mantova after ten appearances as the club went bankrupt, and signed a one-year deal with Padova on 28 July 2010. Roughly one year later, he agreed to a three-year contract with Grosseto.

On 10 January 2013, Ronaldo joined Empoli, but was immediately loaned out to Catanzaro. Back to Empoli in July, he signed a new contract until 2016 on 9 January 2014.

On 16 July 2014, Ronaldo was loaned to Pro Vercelli for one season, but had limited playing time due to suffering a knee injury in November. He returned to Empoli in July 2015, and made his Serie A debut on 23 August, in a 3–1 home loss to Chievo.

In January 2016 Ronaldo was signed by Lazio. However, he was immediately left for sister club Salernitana. The loan was renewed on 31 August.

On 17 July 2019, after two years at Novara, Ronaldo returned to Padova. On 22 July 2022, he signed a two-year contract with Vicenza.

On 16 July 2025, Ronaldo left Italy for the first time in his career, joining Spanish Segunda División side CD Castellón on a one-year deal.
