= Brian Cipenga =

Congolese footballer (born 1998)

Personal information
- Full name: Brian Kibambe Cipenga
- Date of birth: 11 March 1998 (age 28)
- Place of birth: Kinshasa, DR Congo
- Height: 1.72 m (5 ft 8 in)
- Position: Winger

Team information
- Current team: Almería
- Number: 17

Youth career
- Boavista

Senior career*
| Years | Team | Apps | (Gls) |
| 2017–2018 | Boavista B | 7 | (0) |
| 2018–2019 | Freamunde | 28 | (8) |
| 2019–2020 | Famalicão | 0 | (0) |
| 2020–2021 | Ideal | 21 | (3) |
| 2021–2022 | Anadia | 11 | (0) |
| 2022–2023 | Länk Vilaverdense | 42 | (3) |
| 2023–2024 | Paços Ferreira | 31 | (4) |
| 2024–2026 | Castellón | 45 | (9) |
| 2026– | Almería | 11 | (3) |

International career^{‡}
| 2025– | DR Congo | 12 | (1) |
- * Club domestic league appearances and goals as of 20 September 2026 ‡ National team caps and goals as of 28 September 2026

Brian Kibambe Cipenga (born 11 March 1998) is a Congolese professional footballer who plays as a winger for Spanish club Almería and the DR Congo national team.

== Club career ==
Born in Kinshasa, Cipenga moved to Portugal at an early age, and was a Boavista FC youth graduate. After making his senior debut with the reserves in the 2017–18 season, he moved to fellow Porto FA Elite Division side Freamunde in 2018.

In 2019, Cipenga joined Famalicão, but only featured for their under-23 team in the Liga Revelação. On 16 July 2020, he signed for Campeonato de Portugal side SC Ideal.

In July 2021, Cipenga agreed to a deal with Anadia in the Liga 3. The following 26 January, he moved to Campeonato de Portugal side Länk FC Vilaverdense, and helped in their promotion to Liga 3 at the end of the season.

On 21 June 2023, Cipenga was announced at Liga Portugal 2 side Paços de Ferreira. He made his professional debut on 12 August, starting in a 0–0 home draw against União de Leiria, and scored his first goal fourteen days later, in a 5–1 home routing of CD Tondela.

On 6 July 2024, Cipenga moved abroad and joined Spanish Segunda División side Castellón. On 25 June 2026, he agreed to a three-year deal with fellow league team Almería.

== International career ==
Cipenga was called up to the DR Congo national team for a set of 2026 FIFA World Cup qualification matches in October 2025. He was part of the squad that secured qualification for the FIFA World Cup after a historic 1–0 victory over Jamaica, sealed by a 100th-minute goal from Axel Tuanzebe, marking the nation's first World Cup appearance in 52 years.

On 19 May 2026, Cipenga was included in the 26-man squad selected by head coach Sébastien Desabre to represent the DR Congo at the 2026 FIFA World Cup. Cipenga had a supporting role during the group-stage of the World Cup, and scored his first international goal seven minutes into DR Congo's round of 32 match against England. DR Congo had the lead during the first half because of Cipenga's goal, but England went on to score two goals in the second half, ultimately winning the match.

== Career statistics ==
=== Club ===
As of match played 19 September 2026

Appearances, goals, and clean sheets by club, season, and competition
| Club | Season | League | | | Cup | | League Cup | | Europe | | Other | | Total | |
| Club | Season | Division | Apps | Goals | Apps | Goals | Apps | Goals | Apps | Goals | Apps | Goals | Apps | Goals |
|---|---|---|---|---|---|---|---|---|---|---|---|---|---|---|
| Boavista B | 2017–18 | Liga Portugal 2 | 7 | 0 | — | | — | | — | | — | | 7 | 0 |
| Freamunde | 2018–19 | Porto Football Association | 28 | 8 | — | | — | | — | | — | | 28 | 8 |
| Famalicão | 2019–20 | Primeira Liga | 0 | 0 | 0 | 0 | — | | — | | — | | 0 | 0 |
| Ideal | 2020–21 | Campeonato de Portugal | 21 | 3 | — | | — | | — | | — | | 21 | 3 |
| Anadia | 2021–22 | Liga 3 | 11 | 0 | 2 | 1 | — | | — | | — | | 13 | 1 |
| Länk Vilaverdense | 2022–23 | Liga 3 | 42 | 2 | 5 | 0 | — | | — | | 4 (Note: Appearances in promotion play-offs) | 0 | 51 | 2 |
| Paços Ferreira | 2023–24 | Primeira Liga | 31 | 4 | 1 | 0 | 1 | 0 | — | | — | | 33 | 4 |
| Castellón | 2024–25 | Segunda División | 15 | 3 | 2 | 0 | — | | — | | — | | 17 | 3 |
| Castellón | 2025–26 | Segunda División | 30 | 6 | 0 | 0 | — | | — | | — | | 30 | 6 |
| Castellón | Total | | 45 | 9 | 2 | 0 | — | | — | | — | | 47 | 2 |
| Almería | 2026–27 | Segunda División | 6 | 1 | — | | — | | — | | — | | 6 | 1 |
| Career total | | | 191 | 27 | 10 | 1 | 1 | 0 | 0 | 0 | 4 | 0 | 206 | 28 |

=== International ===
As of match played 28 September 2026

Appearances and goals by national team and year
| National team | Year | Apps | Goals |
|---|---|---|---|
| DR Congo | 2025 | 6 | 0 |
| DR Congo | 2026 | 6 | 1 |
| Total | | 12 | 1 |

DR Congo score listed first, score column indicates score after each Cipenga goal.

List of international goals scored by Brian Cipenga
| No. | Date | Venue | Cap | Opponent | Score | Result | Competition |
|---|---|---|---|---|---|---|---|
| 1 | 1 July 2026 | Mercedes-Benz Stadium, Atlanta, United States | 10 | England | 1–0 | 1–2 | 2026 FIFA World Cup |
