= Dumat =

Dumat may refer to:

== Surname ==
- Henri Dumat (born 1947), French politician
- Louis Dumat (1901–1975), French politician
- Philippe Dumat (1925–2006), French actor

== Other uses ==
- Dumat al-Jandal, Antic village in north of Saudi Arabia
