= David Flakus Bosilj =

Slovenian footballer (born 2002)

Personal information
- Date of birth: 1 February 2002 (age 24)
- Place of birth: Maribor, Slovenia
- Height: 1.85 m (6 ft 1 in)
- Position: Striker

Team information
- Current team: Murcia
- Number: 23

Youth career
- –2015: Pobrežje
- 2015–2017: Malečnik
- 2017–2018: Aluminij
- 2021–2022: Hellas Verona

Senior career*
Years	Team	Apps	(Gls)
2018–2021	Aluminij	57	(8)
2021–2024	Hellas Verona	0	(0)
2022–2023	→ Bravo (loan)	27	(2)
2023–2024	→ De Graafschap (loan)	37	(6)
2024–2025	Castellón	10	(1)
2025	→ Murcia (loan)	17	(7)
2025–	Murcia	37	(11)

International career
2017	Slovenia U15	5	(0)
2017–2018	Slovenia U16	9	(1)
2018–2019	Slovenia U17	12	(2)
2019	Slovenia U18	2	(0)
2020	Slovenia U19	2	(2)
2021–2025	Slovenia U21	27	(4)
- * Club domestic league appearances and goals as of 31 May 2026

David Flakus Bosilj (born 1 February 2002) is a Slovenian professional footballer who plays as a striker for Spanish Primera Federación – Group 2 club Murcia.

== Club career ==
=== Early years ===
Flakus Bosilj began his football career with Pobrežje in his hometown Maribor. In 2015, aged 13, he moved to the youth academy of Malečnik, where he progressed through youth age groups until the 2016–17 season. During the winter break of the 2016–17 season, Flakus Bosilj joined the youth department of Aluminij. His consistent performances in the youth teams led to his inclusion in the senior squad in late 2018 by head coach Oliver Bogatinov.

On 10 May 2019, Flakus Bosilj made his professional debut in a 3–0 away loss against Rudar Velenje, where he replaced Luka Štor in the 78th minute.

In the 2019–20 season, he became a regular on the first-team bench, making brief appearances. He scored his first goals during an 8–1 victory over Triglav Kranj on 4 December 2019. After the COVID-19 lockdown, he became a regular starter, concluding the season with 16 league appearances and contributing to his team's fifth-place finish.

=== Hellas Verona ===
On 20 August 2021, Flakus Bosilj signed with Serie A club Hellas Verona and joined their youth team.

On 31 August 2022, a loan agreement was officially announced with Slovenian club Bravo. He made his debut for the club on 5 September against Radomlje, entering the match as a substitute for Luka Štor in the 66th minute of a 1–1 league draw.

Flakus Bosilj was sent on a season-long loan with an option to buy to De Graafschap on 11 August 2023. He scored on his debut for the club on 21 August, helping the Superboeren to a 2–1 victory against Jong Ajax.

=== Castellón ===
On 21 August 2024, Flakus Bosilj signed a two-year contract with Spanish Segunda División side Castellón.

=== Murcia ===
In January 2025, after being rarely used, he moved to Primera Federación club Murcia on loan for the remainder of the 2024–25 season. On 31 August, he signed a permanent contract with the club.

== Career statistics ==
As of match played 24 May 2026

Appearances and goals by club, season and competition
Club	Season	League			National cup (Note: Includes Slovenian Football Cup, KNVB Cup, Copa del Rey)		Other		Total	
Club	Season	Division	Apps	Goals	Apps	Goals	Apps	Goals	Apps	Goals
Aluminij	2018–19	PrvaLiga	3	0	—		—		3	0
Aluminij	2019–20	PrvaLiga	16	3	4	0	—		20	3
Aluminij	2020–21	PrvaLiga	33	5	1	0	—		34	5
Aluminij	2021–22	PrvaLiga	5	0	—		—		5	0
Aluminij	Total		57	8	5	0	—		62	8
Hellas Verona	2021–22	Serie A	0	0	0	0	—		0	0
Hellas Verona	2022–23	Serie A	0	0	0	0	—		0	0
Hellas Verona	2023–24	Serie A	0	0	0	0	—		0	0
Hellas Verona	Total		0	0	0	0	—		0	0
Bravo (loan)	2022–23	PrvaLiga	27	2	3	2	—		30	4
De Graafschap (loan)	2023–24	Eerste Divisie	37	6	2	0	2 (Note: Appearances in Eredivisie play-offs)	0	41	6
Castellón	2024–25	Segunda División	10	1	2	1	—		12	2
Murcia (loan)	2024–25	Primera Federación	17	7	0	0	2 (Note: Appearances in 2025 Primera Federación play-offs)	0	19	7
Murcia	2025–26	Primera Federación	37	11	3	0	—		40	11
Murcia	Total		54	18	3	0	2	0	59	18
Career total			185	35	15	3	4	0	204	38
