= José Ferrer (Spanish footballer) =

Spanish footballer (born 1950)

Personal information
- Full name: José Fernando Ferrer Selma
- Date of birth: 28 October 1950 (age 76)
- Place of birth: Castellón, Spain
- Height: 1.78 m (5 ft 10 in)
- Position: Defender

Youth career
- 1965–1968: Castellón

Senior career*
Years	Team	Apps	(Gls)
1968–1969	Castellón B		
1969–1974	Castellón	133	(4)
1969–1970	→ Piel (loan)		
1974–1978	Español	83	(2)
1979–1980	Levante	9	(0)
1980–1983	Castellón	62	(0)

International career
1971	Spain U23	1	(0)
1971–1974	Spain amateur	5	(0)
- * Club domestic league appearances and goals

José Fernando Ferrer Selma (born 28 October 1950 in Castellón de la Plana, Valencian Community) is a Spanish retired footballer who played as a defender.

== Honours ==
Castellón

- Segunda División: 1980–81
- Copa del Generalísimo: Runner-up 1972–73
