= Michał Willmann =

Polish footballer

Personal information
- Date of birth: 22 July 2004 (age 22)
- Place of birth: Bielsko-Biała, Poland
- Height: 1.70 m (5 ft 7 in)
- Position: Right-back

Team information
- Current team: Castellón
- Number: 30

Youth career
- 2008–2021: Podbeskidzie

Senior career*
Years	Team	Apps	(Gls)
2021–2024	Podbeskidzie II	50	(9)
2022–2025	Podbeskidzie	52	(0)
2025–	Castellón B	14	(1)
2025–	Castellón	2	(0)
- * Club domestic league appearances and goals as of 17 October 2026

Michał Willmann (born 22 July 2004) is a Polish professional footballer who plays as a right-back for Spanish club CD Castellón.

== Career ==
Born in Bielsko-Biała, Willmann joined hometown side Podbeskidzie Bielsko-Biała at the age of four. On 21 July 2022, after spending the previous season with the reserve team, he signed his first professional two-year contract with the club, being promoted to the first team.

Willmann made his professional debut on 27 August 2022, starting in a 5–0 I liga loss to Stal Rzeszów. He was a backup in his first two seasons, suffering relegation to the II liga at the end of the 2023–24 campaign, but became an undisputed starter in the 2024–25 II liga, being included in the Team of the Season.

On 21 July 2025, Willmann moved abroad for the first time in his career, signing a four-year contract with Spanish Segunda División side CD Castellón; he was initially registered in the B-team.

== Honours ==
Podbeskidzie II

- IV liga Silesia II: 2023–24
- Polish Cup (Bielsko-Biała regionals): 2023–24
