= Serpeta =

Spanish footballer

Personal information
- Full name: Sergio Sanchís Hernández
- Date of birth: 7 April 2000 (age 26)
- Place of birth: Canals, Spain
- Height: 1.79 m (5 ft 10 in)
- Position: Winger

Team information
- Current team: Águilas (on loan from Castellón)

Youth career
- 2005–2010: Sporting Canals
- 2010–2014: Valencia
- 2014–2017: Sporting Canals
- 2017–2018: Olímpic Xàtiva
- 2018–2019: Almería

Senior career*
Years	Team	Apps	(Gls)
2018	Olímpic Xàtiva	6	(0)
2019–2021	Almería B	41	(1)
2021–2022	Olímpic Xàtiva	32	(5)
2022–2023	Atzeneta	28	(1)
2023–2025	Yeclano	66	(6)
2025–	Castellón	3	(0)
2026	→ Unionistas (loan)	14	(1)
2026–	→ Águilas (loan)	0	(0)
- * Club domestic league appearances and goals as of 30 June 2026

Sergio Sanchís Hernández (born 7 April 2000), commonly known as Serpeta, is a Spanish footballer who plays mainly as a left winger for Águilas FC, on loan from CD Castellón.

== Career ==
Born in Canals, Valencian Community, Serpeta began his career with local side CF Sporting Canals at the age of five. He then spent four years in the youth sides of Valencia CF, before returning to Canals and subsequently playing for CD Olímpic de Xàtiva, where he would make his first team debut in Tercera División.

In 2018, Serpeta joined UD Almería; initially a member of the Juvenil squad, he started to feature with the reserves in March of the following year, and also played with the first team in a friendly against FC Ufa the previous month. On 23 July 2021, he returned to Olímpic, with the club in Tercera División RFEF.

On 15 July 2022, after suffering relegation, Serpeta signed for fellow fifth tier side Atzeneta UE. Roughly one year later, he moved to Segunda Federación side Yeclano Deportivo.

On 26 June 2024, after being the club's top scorer with eight goals as they achieved promotion to Primera Federación, Serpeta renewed his link with Yeclano for a further year. On 3 July 2025, after suffering team relegation, he agreed to a three-year deal with CD Castellón in Segunda División.

Serpeta made his professional debut on 16 August 2025, coming on as a second-half substitute for Awer Mabil in a 3–1 away loss to Racing de Santander. After being rarely used, he was loaned to Unionistas de Salamanca CF on 29 January 2026.

On 10 July 2026, Serpeta joined Águilas FC also in the third division, again on a temporary deal.
