= Tincho Conde =

Spanish footballer

Personal information
- Full name: Martín Conde Gómez
- Date of birth: 25 March 2003 (age 23)
- Place of birth: Ourense, Spain
- Height: 1.67 m (5 ft 6 in)
- Position: Left-back

Team information
- Current team: Castellón
- Number: 20

Youth career
- 2008–2014: Pabellón Ourense
- 2014–2022: Celta

Senior career*
Years	Team	Apps	(Gls)
2022–2025	Celta B	83	(6)
2025–	Castellón	15	(0)
- * Club domestic league appearances and goals as of 17 October 2026

Martín "Tincho" Conde Gómez (born 25 March 2003) is a Spanish footballer who plays as a left-back for CD Castellón.

== Career ==
Born in Ourense, Galicia, Conde began his career with hometown side Pabellón Ourense CF at the age of five. In 2014, aged 11, he moved to the youth sides of RC Celta de Vigo.

After progressing through the youth categories, Conde made his senior debut with the reserves on 28 August 2022, starting in a 2–1 Primera Federación home loss to UD San Sebastián de los Reyes. He scored his first senior goal on 26 November, netting the B's second in a 2–1 away win over San Fernando CD.

Conde subsequently established himself as a regular starter for the B-team, before joining Segunda División side CD Castellón on a four-year contract on 12 August 2025. He made his professional debut four days later, coming on as a second-half substitute for Brian Cipenga in a 3–1 away loss to Racing de Santander.
