= Agustín Sienra =

Argentine professional footballer

Personal information
- Date of birth: 14 July 1999 (age 27)
- Place of birth: Capitán Bermúdez, Argentina
- Height: 1.85 m (6 ft 1 in)
- Position: Centre-back

Team information
- Current team: Castellón
- Number: 4

Youth career
- Defensores Santa Catalina
- Newell's Old Boys
- 2016–2020: Defensa y Justicia

Senior career*
Years	Team	Apps	(Gls)
2020–2026	Defensa y Justicia	5	(0)
2021–2022	→ Villa San Carlos (loan)	31	(0)
2023–2024	→ San Martín de San Juan (loan)	51	(0)
2025–2026	→ Castellón (loan)	25	(1)
2026–	Castellón	9	(2)
- * Club domestic league appearances and goals as of 17 October 2026

Agustín Sienra (born 14 July 1999) is an Argentine professional footballer who plays as a centre-back for Spanish club CD Castellón.

== Career ==
Sienra started off his career with Defensores Santa Catalina, before later signing with Newell's Old Boys. In 2016, following a trial, Sienra joined the youth system of Defensa y Justicia. He made the move into first-team football towards the back end of 2020, appearing as an unused substitute for Copa Libertadores matches with Delfín (twice) and Olimpia and a Copa de la Liga Profesional encounter with Colón between September and November. It was in the latter month that the centre-back made his senior debut, as he featured for seventy-nine minutes of a domestic defeat to Central Córdoba on 29 November.

On 5 August 2021, Sienra was loaned to Villa San Carlos until December 2022. On 5 January 2023, he moved to San Martín de San Juan also in a temporary deal.

Sienra helped San Martín to achieve promotion to the top tier in 2024, before returning to Defensa for the 2025 season. On 7 July of that year, after just three further first team appearances, he moved abroad and signed a one-year deal with Spanish Segunda División side Castellón.

== Career statistics ==
As of 7 July 2025.

Appearances and goals by club, season and competition
Club	Season	League			Cup		Continental		Other		Total	
Club	Season	Division	Apps	Goals	Apps	Goals	Apps	Goals	Apps	Goals	Apps	Goals
Defensa y Justicia	2020–21 (Note: Soccerway counts Copa de la Liga Profesional appearances as league appearances.)	Primera División	2	0	0	0	0	0	—		2	0
Defensa y Justicia	2021	Primera División	1	0	0	0	0	0	—		1	0
Defensa y Justicia	2025	Primera División	2	0	1	0	0	0	—		3	0
Defensa y Justicia	Total		5	0	1	0	0	0	—		6	0
Villa San Carlos (loan)	2021	Primera B Metropolitana	?	0	0	0	—		—		?	0
Villa San Carlos (loan)	2022	Primera B Metropolitana	?	0	0	0	—		—		?	0
Villa San Carlos (loan)	Total		31	0	0	0	—		—		31	0
San Martín de San Juan (loan)	2023	Primera Nacional	14	0	2	0	—		—		16	0
San Martín de San Juan (loan)	2024	Primera Nacional	37	0	1	0	—		—		38	0
San Martín de San Juan (loan)	Total		51	0	3	0	—		—		54	0
Castellón	2025–26	Segunda División	0	0	0	0	—		—		0	0
Career total			87	0	4	0	0	0	0	0	91	0
