= Iago Parente =

Spanish footballer (born 2006)

Personal information
- Full name: Iago Parente Novoa
- Date of birth: 25 February 2006 (age 20)
- Place of birth: Valladolid, Spain
- Height: 1.80 m (5 ft 11 in)
- Position: Centre-back

Team information
- Current team: Castellón B

Youth career
- 2011–2014: Cigales
- 2014–2016: Juventud Rondilla
- 2016–2024: Valladolid

Senior career*
Years	Team	Apps	(Gls)
2023–2026	Valladolid B	62	(1)
2025	Valladolid	1	(0)
2026–	Castellón B	0	(0)
- * Club domestic league appearances and goals as of 14 May 2026

Iago Parente Novoa (born 25 February 2006) is a Spanish footballer who plays as a centre-back for CD Castellón B.

== Career ==
Born in Valladolid, Castile and León, Parente joined Real Valladolid's youth sides in 2016, after representing CD Juventud Rondilla and CD Cigales. He made his senior debut with the reserves on 24 September 2023, starting in a 2–1 Segunda Federación home loss to Real Avilés Industrial CF.

Definitely promoted to the B-team in June 2024, Parente established himself as a starter for the side before making his main squad – and La Liga – debut on 13 May 2025, starting in a 1–0 home loss to Girona FC, as the club was already relegated.
