= Tommaso De Nipoti =

Italian footballer

Personal information
- Date of birth: 23 July 2003 (age 23)
- Place of birth: Udine, Italy
- Height: 1.80 m (5 ft 11 in)
- Position: Striker

Team information
- Current team: Atalanta U23
- Number: 80

Youth career
- –2017: Udinese
- 2017–2023: Atalanta

Senior career*
Years	Team	Apps	(Gls)
2022–	Atalanta	2	(0)
2023–	Atalanta U23	45	(3)
2025–2026	→ Castellón (loan)	9	(0)

International career^{‡}
2018–2019	Italy U16	6	(1)
2019	Italy U17	6	(1)
2021	Italy U19	1	(1)
2022	Italy U20	2	(0)
- * Club domestic league appearances and goals as of 30 August 2026 ‡ National team caps and goals as of 21 November 2022

Tommaso De Nipoti (born 23 July 2003) is an Italian professional footballer who plays as forward for Serie C Group C club Atalanta U23.

== Career ==
In 2017, De Nipoti moved from Udinese to Atalanta. He debuted for Atalanta on 22 January 2022 in a 0–0 draw against Lazio.

On 1 September 2025, after being mainly a member of the Atalanta U23 squad in the Serie C, De Nipoti was loaned to Spanish Segunda División side Castellón.
