= Fabrizio Brignani =

Italian footballer (born 1998)

Personal information
- Date of birth: 13 January 1998 (age 28)
- Place of birth: Asola, Italy
- Height: 1.93 m (6 ft 4 in)
- Position: Centre-back

Team information
- Current team: Castellón
- Number: 3

Youth career
- –2017: Cremonese
- 2016–2017: → Bologna (loan)
- 2017–2018: Bologna

Senior career*
Years	Team	Apps	(Gls)
2017–2021	Bologna	0	(0)
2018–2019	→ Pisa (loan)	21	(1)
2019–2020	→ Cesena (loan)	19	(0)
2020–2021	→ Vis Pesaro (loan)	31	(0)
2021–2023	Olbia	67	(4)
2023–2025	Mantova	58	(11)
2025–	Castellón	32	(6)
- * Club domestic league appearances and goals as of 17 October 2026

Fabrizio Brignani (born 13 January 1998) is an Italian professional footballer who plays as a centre-back for Segunda División club Castellón.

== Club career ==
=== Bologna ===
Born in Asola, Brignani was a youth exponent of Bologna.

==== Loan to Pisa ====
On 6 August 2019, Brignani was signed by Serie C side Pisa on a season-long loan deal. On 12 August he made his competitive debut for Pisa in a 1–0 away win against Parma in the third round of Coppa Italia. On 7 October he made his professional debut in Serie C for the club in a 0–0 home draw against Alessandria, he played the entire match. On 30 December he was sent-off with a double yellow card in the 87th minute of a 0–0 away draw against Cuneo. On 16 March 2019, Brignani scored his first professional goal in the 39th minute of a 1–0 away win over Olbia. Brignani ended his loan to Pisa with 24 appearances and 1 goal.

==== Loan to Cesena ====
On 12 July 2019, Brignani was loaned to newly promoted Serie C club Cesena on a season-long loan deal. Six weeks later, on 25 August, Brignani made his league debut for Cesena in a 4–1 away defeat against Carpi, he was replaced by Luca Ricci in the 46th minute. One week later, on 2 September, he played his first entire match for the club, a 2–1 home defeat against Vis Pesaro. He became Cesena's first-choice early in the season. Brignani ended his season-long loan to Cesena with 19 appearances, including 15 as a starter, remaining an unused substitute for 11 other matches.

==== Loan to Vis Pesaro ====
On 7 September 2020, Brignani was signed by Serie C club Vis Pesaro on season-long loan. Three weeks later, on 26 September, he made his debut for the club in a 2–2 home draw against Legnago Salus. He became Vis Pesaro's first-choice early in the season. Brignani ended his season-long loan to Vis Pesaro with 31 appearances, including 21 of them as a starter, remaining an unused substitute only 7 times in the entire championship.

=== Olbia ===
On 21 August 2021, he moved to Olbia on a permanent basis and signed a two-year contract.

=== Mantova ===
On 17 July 2023, Brignani signed a two-year contract with Mantova.

=== Castellón ===
On 15 July 2025, Spanish Segunda División side Castellón reached an agreement with Mantova for the transfer of Brignani. He signed a four-year contract with his new club.

== Career statistics ==
=== Club ===
As of match played 12 March 2022

Club	Season	League			Cup		Europe		Other		Total	
Club	Season	League	Apps	Goals	Apps	Goals	Apps	Goals	Apps	Goals	Apps	Goals
Pisa (loan)	2018–19	Serie C	21	1	2	0	—		1 (Note: All appearance(s) in Serie C play-off.)	0	24	1
Cesena (loan)	2019–20	Serie C	19	0	0	0	—		—		19	0
Vis Pesaro (loan)	2020–21	Serie C	31	0	0	0	—		—		31	0
Olbia	2021–22	Serie C	26	2	0	0	—		—		26	2
Career total			97	3	2	0	—		1	0	100	3
