= Daijiro Chirino =

Dutch footballer (born 2002)

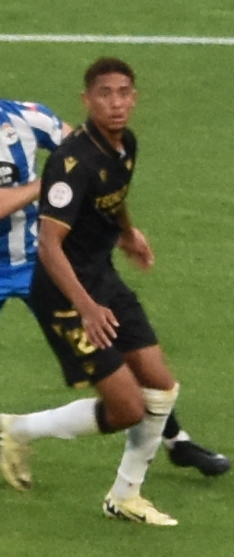
- Chirino playing for Castellón in 2024

Personal information
- Full name: Daijiro Florencio Chirino
- Date of birth: 24 January 2002 (age 24)
- Place of birth: Zwolle, Netherlands
- Height: 1.85 m (6 ft 1 in)
- Position: Right-back

Team information
- Current team: Almería
- Number: 22

Youth career
- –2014: ZAC
- 2014–2022: PEC Zwolle

Senior career*
Years	Team	Apps	(Gls)
2022–2023	PEC Zwolle	30	(1)
2023–2025	Castellón	72	(1)
2025–	Almería	32	(3)

International career
2019	Netherlands U17	1	(0)
2019	Netherlands U19	2	(0)
- * Club domestic league appearances and goals as of 3 June 2026

Daijiro Florencio Chirino (born 24 January 2002) is a professional soccer player who plays as a right-back for Segunda División club UD Almería.

== Club career ==
=== PEC Zwolle ===
Chirino joined the PEC Zwolle Football Academy in 2014 having begun his career with local club ZAC. In 2019 Chirino signed his first professional contract with the club. In June 2022 he signed a new contract two year with PEC Zwolle, with the option of a further season. He made his first team debut in August 2022 in a 5-0 Eerste Divisie win against SC Telstar and shortly afterwards officially signed a contract extension into 2025.

On 4 November 2022 Chirino scored his first professional goal against TOP Oss in a 5–0 win in the Eerste Divisie. Chirino played his first KNVB Cup game in January 2023 against Eredivisie side Feyenoord. Later on that same week he started two consecutive matches for the first time in his career playing as a wing-back against Heracles Almelo.

=== CD Castellón ===
On 31 August 2023, Chirino signed with Castellón in the Spanish third-tier Primera Federación. He made his debut for the club on 3 September 2023 in a 2–1 away win against UD Melilla. He scored his first goal for the club the following month in a 4–1 league victory over Real Madrid Castilla on 7 October 2023.

Chirino helped the Orelluts to achieve promotion to Segunda División in his first year, and remained a regular starter in his second, totalling one goal in 79 appearances overall.

=== Almería ===
On 6 July 2025, Chirino signed a five-year contract with fellow second division side UD Almería.

== International career ==
Chirino was called up to play for the Curaçao national team for a set of friendlies in June 2023.

== Personal life ==
Born in the Netherlands, Chirino is of Curaçao and Indonesian descent.

Chirino has been good friends with fellow professional footballer Jayden Oosterwolde since they played youth football together at ZAC.
