= Romain Matthys =

Belgian footballer (born 1998)

Personal information
- Date of birth: 10 July 1998 (age 28)
- Place of birth: Seraing, Belgium
- Height: 1.83 m (6 ft 0 in)
- Position: Goalkeeper

Team information
- Current team: Castellón
- Number: 13

Youth career
- 2004–2007: Euro Youth Liège 75
- 2007–2015: Daring Club De Cointe
- 2008–2011: → RFC Sérésien (loan)
- 2012–2015: → RFC Liège (loan)
- 2015–2016: RFC Liège

Senior career*
Years	Team	Apps	(Gls)
2016–2019	RFC Liège	76	(0)
2019–2022	Eupen	0	(0)
2020–2021	→ RWDM (loan)	2	(0)
2021–2022	→ MVV (loan)	26	(0)
2021–2025	MVV	113	(0)
2025–	Castellón	48	(0)
- * Club domestic league appearances and goals as of 17 October 2026

Romain Matthys (born 10 July 1998) is a Belgian professional footballer who plays as a goalkeeper for Segunda División club Castellón.

== Career ==
=== RFC Liège ===
Matthys started playing football at Euro Youth Liège 75, which merged with Daring Club De Cointe in 2007. In 2012, he joined the youth academy of RFC Liège, where he had his first opportunity to sit on the bench with the first team in the 2015–16 season. On 7 August 2016, he made his official debut for the club's first team during the Belgian Cup game against RFC Warnant, which the Liège side won 3–1.

He played his first league game for RFC Liège against RRC Hamoir in the Belgian Second Amateur Division on 13 November 2016. From January 2017 on, he became the club's starting goalkeeper. Matthys made 18 league appearances for RFC Liège in his debut season, including play-off matches against Olympic Charleroi, Olsa Brakel and Eendracht Aalst. RFC Liège ended up narrowly missing out on promotion to First Amateur Division. A year later, the managed to win promotion to the First Amateur Division, where Matthys remained starting goalkeeper.

=== Eupen ===
On 17 July 2019, Matthys secured a transfer to top division Belgian Pro League club Eupen, where he signed a three-year contract, becoming the backup to Ortwin De Wolf alongside Abdul Manaf Nurudeen. In his debut season with Eupen, he made only one official appearance: a cup match against Cappellen, which Eupen won after a penalty shootout.

==== RWDM (loan) ====
In August 2020, Eupen sent Matthys on loan to RWDM for one season. He made his competitive debut for the club on 10 October 2020 in the cup match against Union Rochefortoise, which RWDM won 8–1. When starting goalkeeper Anthony Sadin was deemed unfit for the league match against Lommel on 24 January 2021, Matthys made his debut in Belgian First Division B. RWDM lost this match 3–2, despite having a 2–0 lead at half-time. A week later, he also started the derby against Union Saint-Gilloise, which RWDM lost 2–0. Afterwards, Sadin took over the starting job once again.

=== MVV ===
In July 2021, alongside Eupen teammates Simon Libert and Marciano Aziz, Matthys was sent on a one-season loan to Dutch Eerste Divisie club MVV, where Matthys became the backup to Thijmen Nijhuis, who had been loaned from Utrecht in the same transfer window. On 26 October 2021, Matthys made his competitive debut for MVV in the cup match against ACV Assen, which head coach Klaas Wels had him start. In this match, Matthys not only kept a clean sheet, but also delivered an assist to Mart Remans' 2–0 goal. On 5 November 2021, he made his league debut for MVV in the 1–0 win over Jong AZ, keeping another clean sheet in another 90-minute performance. Matthys stayed on as starting goalkeeper from then on, and was named in the Eerste Divisie Team of the Year for the 2021–22 season.

In April 2022, Matthys signed a two-year permanent deal with MVV, with an option for a third season. Following another impressive season, Matthys had the most saves in the league (166) as well as the best save percentage (72%) and helped the club secure a spot in the promotion play-offs. As a result of his outstanding performance, he was honoured with a consecutive selection to the Eerste Divisie Team of the Year.

=== Castellón ===
On 18 June 2025, Matthys signed a two-year contract with Segunda División side Castellón.

== Career statistics ==
As of match played 28 March 2025

Appearances and goals by club, season and competition
Club	Season	League			National cup		Other		Total	
Club	Season	Division	Apps	Goals	Apps	Goals	Apps	Goals	Apps	Goals
RFC Liège	2016–17	Belgian Second Amateur Division	18	0	2	0	—		20	0
RFC Liège	2017–18	Belgian Second Amateur Division	28	0	5	0	—		33	0
RFC Liège	2018–19	Belgian First Amateur Division	30	0	2	0	—		32	0
RFC Liège	Total		76	0	9	0	—		85	0
Eupen	2019–20	Belgian First Division A	0	0	1	0	—		1	0
Eupen	2019–20	Belgian First Division A	0	0	0	0	—		0	0
Eupen	2019–20	Belgian First Division A	0	0	0	0	—		0	0
Eupen	Total		0	0	1	0	—		1	0
RWDM (loan)	2020–21	Belgian First Division B	2	0	1	0	—		3	0
MVV (loan)	2021–22	Eerste Divisie	26	0	2	0	—		28	0
MVV	2022–23	Eerste Divisie	38	0	1	0	2 (Note: Appearances in Eredivisie promotion/relegation playoffs)	0	41	0
MVV	2023–24	Eerste Divisie	37	0	0	0	—		37	0
MVV	2024–25	Eerste Divisie	32	0	2	0	—		34	0
MVV	Total		133	0	5	0	2	0	140	0
Career total			192	0	14	0	2	0	208	0

== Honours ==
Individual

- Eerste Divisie Team of the Year: 2021–22, 2022–23
