= Óscar Gil (footballer, born 1995) =

Spanish footballer

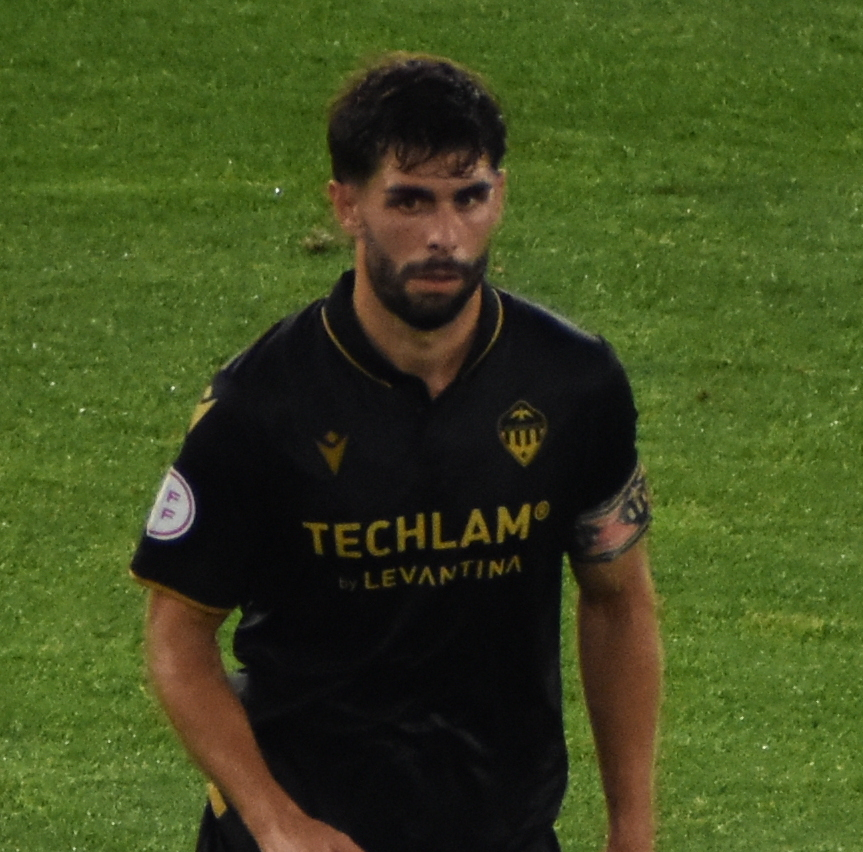
- Gil with Castellón in 2024

Personal information
- Full name: Óscar Gil Osés
- Date of birth: 14 June 1995 (age 31)
- Place of birth: Peralta, Spain
- Height: 1.83 m (6 ft 0 in)
- Position: Centre back

Team information
- Current team: Murcia
- Number: 15

Youth career
- Azkoyen
- 2008–2013: Athletic Bilbao

Senior career*
Years	Team	Apps	(Gls)
2012–2013	Basconia	22	(1)
2013–2018	Bilbao Athletic	106	(8)
2016–2017	→ Oviedo (loan)	14	(0)
2017–2018	Athletic Bilbao	0	(0)
2018–2021	Racing Santander	53	(2)
2020	→ Atlético Baleares (loan)	4	(0)
2021–2022	Amorebieta	28	(1)
2022–2026	Castellón	84	(4)
2026–	Murcia	18	(5)

International career
2011–2012	Spain U17	5	(0)
2013	Spain U18	1	(0)
2013–2014	Spain U19	6	(2)
- * Club domestic league appearances and goals as of 30 June 2026

Óscar Gil Osés (Spanish pronunciation: [ˈoskaɾ ˈxil oˈses]; born 14 June 1995) is a Spanish professional footballer who plays as a centre-back for Real Murcia CF.

== Club career ==
=== Athletic Bilbao ===
Born in Peralta – Azkoien, Navarre, Gil joined Athletic Bilbao's youth setup in 2008, aged 13. He made his debuts as a senior with the farm team in the 2012–13 campaign, in Tercera División.

On 21 June 2013 Gil was promoted to the reserves in Segunda División B. He appeared in 22 matches and scored one goal in the 2014–15 season, as the B-side returned to Segunda División after a 19-year absence.

Gil made his professional debut on 24 August 2015, starting in a 0–1 home loss against Girona FC. He scored his first professional goal on 4 April of the following year, netting his team's first in a 2–1 home win against Real Oviedo.

On 16 August 2016, Gil was loaned to Oviedo in a season-long deal. After appearing sparingly, he returned to Athletic and their B-side, now in the third division.

Gil made his first team debut on 25 October 2017, playing the full 90 minutes in a 1–1 Copa del Rey away draw against SD Formentera. The following 29 May, he was released as his contract expired.

=== Racing Santander ===
On 2 August 2018, Racing de Santander confirmed the signing of Gil on a one-year contract. A regular starter in his first season as his side returned to the second division, he was rarely used in his second and moved out on loan to CD Atlético Baleares on 21 January 2020.

=== Amorebieta ===
On 8 July 2021, Gil moved to second level newcomers SD Amorebieta.

=== Castellón ===
On 30 July 2022, Gil was announced at Castellón. An immediate starter, he featured in 33 matches during the 2023–24 season overall, scoring twice and helping the side to achieve promotion to the second division.

=== Murcia ===
On 15 January 2026, after just three matches during the first half of the campaign, Gil moved to Real Murcia CF in the third level.
