= Álex Calatrava (footballer) =

Spanish footballer (born 2000)

Personal information
- Full name: Álex Calatrava Torrado
- Date of birth: 22 June 2000 (age 26)
- Place of birth: Parets del Vallès, Spain
- Height: 1.75 m (5 ft 9 in)
- Position: Winger

Team information
- Current team: Espanyol

Youth career
- Damm
- Barcelona
- Damm
- Horta
- 2018–2019: Sant Andreu

Senior career*
Years	Team	Apps	(Gls)
2018	Horta	1	(0)
2019–2020	Parets	20	(3)
2020–2021	Sants	28	(6)
2021–2022	Costa Brava	19	(2)
2022–2024	Atlético Madrid B	62	(11)
2024–2026	Castellón	73	(20)
2026–	Espanyol	2	(1)
- * Club domestic league appearances and goals as of 23 August 2026

Álex Calatrava Torrado (born 22 June 2000) is a Spanish professional footballer who plays as a winger for RCD Espanyol.

== Career ==
Born in Parets del Vallès, Barcelona, Catalonia, Calatrava began his career at CF Damm. He subsequently spent two years at FC Barcelona's La Masia before returning to Damm and playing for UA Horta.

Calatrava made his senior debut with Horta on 22 April 2018, coming on as a late substitute in a 2–0 Tercera División away loss to CE Europa. In July, he joined UE Sant Andreu and returned to youth setup, before moving to Primera Catalana side CE Parets in the following year.

On 10 June 2020, Calatrava signed for UE Sants in the fourth tier. A regular starter as the club avoided relegation, he left on 19 June 2021.

On 1 July 2021, Calatrava agreed to a deal with Primera División RFEF side UE Llagostera; the club changed name to UE Costa Brava at the end of the month. The following 31 January, he moved to Atlético Madrid on a two-and-a-half-year contract, being assigned to the reserves in Segunda División RFEF.

On 11 July 2024, free agent Calatrava joined CD Castellón, newly-promoted to Segunda División. He made his professional debut on 17 August, replacing Óscar Gil in a 1–0 away loss to SD Eibar.

Calatrava scored his first professional goal on 1 September 2024, netting the Orelluts' second in a 2–0 away win over Burgos CF. He scored 15 goals for the side during the 2025–26 season (including a hat-trick against Málaga CF on 25 April 2026), as the club missed out promotion in the play-offs.

On 2 July 2026, Calatrava signed a five-year contract with La Liga side RCD Espanyol, for a rumoured fee of around € 5 million.
