= Adam Jakobsen =

Danish footballer (born 1999)

Personal information
- Full name: Adam Emil Skaanning Jakobsen
- Date of birth: 7 April 1999 (age 27)
- Place of birth: Copenhagen, Denmark
- Height: 1.85 m (6 ft 1 in)
- Position: Forward

Team information
- Current team: Castellón
- Number: 16

Youth career
- BK Vestia
- Frem

Senior career*
Years	Team	Apps	(Gls)
2017–2018	Frem	37	(12)
2018–2022	Vejle	37	(3)
2020–2021	→ Kolding (loan)	26	(6)
2021–2022	→ Celje (loan)	23	(1)
2022–2024	Fredericia	51	(17)
2024–2025	Brommapojkarna	36	(11)
2025–	Castellón	40	(5)

International career
2018	Denmark U19	2	(0)
- * Club domestic league appearances and goals as of 17 October 2026

Adam Emil Skaanning Jakobsen (born 7 April 1999) is a Danish footballer who plays as a forward for Segunda División side Castellón.

== Biography ==
Born in Copenhagen, Denmark, Adam Jakobsen was developed by the local club BK Frem. He made his professional debut in a Danish third division match against Jammerbugt FC on April 8, 2017. He came on as a substitute, and his team won 3–1.

In the summer of 2018, Adam Jakobsen was signed by Vejle BK, who had just been promoted to the first division. The transfer was officially announced on June 2, 2018, and he signed a three-year contract, running until June 2021.
