= Yussif Saidu =

Ghanaian footballer (born 2005)

Personal information
- Date of birth: 14 June 2005 (age 21)
- Place of birth: Bamako, Mali
- Height: 1.84 m (6 ft 0 in)
- Position: Defensive midfielder

Team information
- Current team: Zaragoza
- Number: 33

Youth career
- 2023–2024: Dansoman Wise XI
- 2023–2024: → Zaragoza (loan)

Senior career*
Years	Team	Apps	(Gls)
2024–2025	Dansoman Wise XI	6	(0)
2024–2025	→ Zaragoza B (loan)	8	(0)
2025	→ Zaragoza (loan)	8	(0)
2025–	Zaragoza	31	(1)
- * Club domestic league appearances and goals as of 9 June 2026

Yussif Saidu (born 14 June 2005) is a Ghanaian footballer who plays as a defensive midfielder for Spanish club Real Zaragoza.

== Early life ==
Born in Mali, Saidu moved to Ghana with part of his family at the age of six, as his parents separated.

== Career ==
Saidu joined Real Zaragoza in September 2023, initially for the Juvenil squad, on loan from local side Dansoman Wise XI FC. His loan was renewed for a further year in July 2024, but bureaucratic issues prevented him to play for the reserves during the first half of the season.

Saidu made his senior debut with the B's on 12 January 2025, coming on as a second-half substitute in a 4–0 Segunda Federación home loss to UD Logroñés. In July, he was called up by manager Gabi to make the pre-season with the first team, and impressed while playing as a centre-back.

Saidu made his professional debut on 23 August 2025, replacing Dani Tasende in a 3–1 Segunda División home loss to FC Andorra. On 25 October, the Maños exercised the buyout clause on his contract, and he signed a permanent deal until 2030.
