= Lucas Alcázar =

Spanish footballer

Personal information
- Full name: Lucas Alcázar Moreno
- Date of birth: 11 July 2002 (age 24)
- Place of birth: Leganés, Spain
- Height: 1.82 m (6 ft 0 in)
- Position: Left-back

Team information
- Current team: Castellón
- Number: 12

Youth career
- 2009–2011: Céltiga Rayo
- 2011–2014: Movilla
- 2014–2018: Getafe
- 2018–2021: Real Madrid

Senior career*
Years	Team	Apps	(Gls)
2020–2023	Real Madrid B	1	(0)
2021–2022	→ Peña Deportiva (loan)	25	(1)
2023	→ Talavera (loan)	12	(0)
2023–2025	Betis B	61	(0)
2025–	Castellón	41	(1)
- * Club domestic league appearances and goals as of 17 October 2026

Lucas Alcázar Moreno (born 11 July 2002) is a Spanish professional footballer who plays as a left-back for CD Castellón.

== Career ==
Born in Leganés, Community of Madrid, Alcázar represented UD Céltiga Rayo, EF José María Movilla and Getafe CF before joining Real Madrid's La Fábrica in 2018. On 6 August 2021, after finishing his formation, he was loaned to Segunda División RFEF side SCR Peña Deportiva, for one year.

Upon returning in July 2022, Alcázar was assigned to reserve team Real Madrid Castilla in Primera Federación. The following 27 January, after being rarely used, he was loaned to fellow third division side CF Talavera de la Reina.

On 8 August 2023, Alcázar moved to Real Betis and was assigned to the reserves in the fourth division. On 5 July 2025, he signed a three-year contract with Segunda División side CD Castellón.

== Career statistics ==
=== Club ===
As of 28 January 2024

Appearances and goals by club, season and competition
Club	Season	League			Other		Total	
Club	Season	Division	Apps	Goals	Apps	Goals	Apps	Goals
Peña Deportiva (loan)	2021–22	Segunda División RFEF	25	1	2 (Note: Appearances in 2022 Segunda División RFEF play-offs)	0	27	1
Real Madrid Castilla	2022–23	Primera Federación	1	0	0	0	1	0
Talavera (loan)	2022–23	Primera Federación	12	0	—		12	0
Betis B	2023–24	Segunda Federación	16	0	0	0	16	0
Career total			54	1	2	0	56	1

== Honours ==
Real Madrid Juvenil A

- UEFA Youth League: 2019–20
