= Pablo Santiago (footballer) =

Spanish footballer

Personal information
- Full name: Pablo Santiago López
- Date of birth: 27 September 2000 (age 26)
- Place of birth: Eibar, Spain
- Height: 1.73 m (5 ft 8 in)
- Position: Winger

Team information
- Current team: Castellón
- Number: 18

Youth career
- Eibar

Senior career*
Years	Team	Apps	(Gls)
2019–2021	Eibar Urko	25	(6)
2021–2023	Vitoria	65	(13)
2023–2025	Barakaldo	65	(20)
2025–	Castellón	41	(6)
- * Club domestic league appearances and goals as of 17 October 2026

Pablo Santiago López (born 27 September 2000) is a Spanish footballer who plays mainly as a left winger for CD Castellón.

== Career ==
Born in Eibar, Gipuzkoa, Basque Country, Santiago played for hometown side SD Eibar as a youth. In July 2019, after finishing his formation, he was assigned to second reserve team SD Eibar Urko.

On 9 July 2021, Santiago was promoted to farm team CD Vitoria in Tercera División RFEF. On 12 July 2023, after scoring eight goals as Vitoria achieved promotion to Segunda Federación, he agreed to a deal with Barakaldo CF also in division four.

Santiago helped the club to achieve promotion to Primera Federación in his first season by scoring nine goals, but only became an undisputed starter in his second, becoming the club's top scorer after the departure of Maroan Sannadi to Athletic Bilbao. He departed the club on 3 June 2025, after scoring a career-best 11 goals during the campaign.

On 5 June 2025, Santiago signed a three-year contract with Segunda División side CD Castellón. He made his professional debut on 22 August, coming on as a second-half substitute for Ousmane Camara in a 1–0 home loss to Real Valladolid.

Santiago scored his first professional goal on 22 November 2025, netting the opener in a 3–1 away win over FC Andorra.
