= Henri Dumat =

French footballer (born 1947)

Personal information
- Full name: Henri Dumat Dufaut
- Date of birth: 20 February 1947 (age 79)
- Place of birth: Bordeaux, France
- Height: 1.74 m (5 ft 9 in)
- Positions: Defender; midfielder

Senior career*
Years	Team	Apps	(Gls)
1964–1965	Reims		
1965–1968	Ajaccio		
1968–1970	Reims		
1970–1973	Ajaccio		
1973–1974	CD Castellón	20	(2)
1974–1976	Troyes		
1976–1981	Libourne		
1981–1984	Grenoble		
- * Club domestic league appearances and goals

Henri Dumat (born 20 February 1947) is a French former professional footballer. He played for Reims, Ajaccio, CD Castellón, Troyes, Libourne and Grenoble.
