= Kenneth Mamah =

Nigerian footballer (born 1998)

Personal information
- Full name: Kenneth Obinna Mamah
- Date of birth: 5 May 1998 (age 28)
- Place of birth: Enugu, Nigeria
- Height: 1.82 m (6 ft 0 in)
- Position: Winger

Team information
- Current team: Ceuta

Senior career*
Years	Team	Apps	(Gls)
2019–2020	Lucera		
2020–2022	Città Varese	49	(15)
2022–2024	Göztepe	57	(10)
2024–2026	Castellón	37	(5)
2026	Vanspor	10	(4)
2026–	Ceuta	0	(0)
- * Club domestic league appearances and goals as of 6 May 2026

Kenneth Obinna Mamah (born 5 May 1998) is a Nigerian professional footballer who plays as a winger for Spanish club AD Ceuta FC.

== Career ==
Born in Enugu, Mamah began his career with Italian Prima Categoria side US Lucera Calcio, helping in their promotion to the Promozione in the 2019–20 season. In September 2020, he moved to ASD Città di Varese in the Serie D, where he failed to find the net in his first season but scored 15 goals in his second.

On 2 July 2022, Mamah left Varese and joined TFF First League side Göztepe SK. He made his professional debut on 14 August, starting and scoring the winner in a 1–0 away success over Sakaryaspor.

Mamah helped Göztepe to a promotion to the Süper Lig at the end of the 2023–24 season, but was transferred to Spanish Segunda División side CD Castellón on 10 July 2024. He made his professional debut on 17 August, starting in a 1–0 away loss to SD Eibar.

On 20 January 2026, Mamah returned to Turkey after joining Vanspor FK in the second division. On 26 July, he moved back to Spain and its second division, agreeing to a two-year deal with AD Ceuta FC.
