= Jérémy Mellot =

French footballer (born 1994)

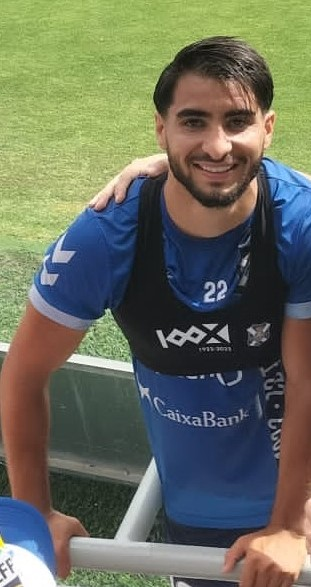
- Mellot training with Tenerife in 2022

Personal information
- Full name: Jérémy Mellot
- Date of birth: 28 March 1994 (age 32)
- Place of birth: Montluçon, France
- Height: 1.78 m (5 ft 10 in)
- Position: Right back

Team information
- Current team: Castellón
- Number: 22

Senior career*
| Years | Team | Apps | (Gls) |
| 2013–2015 | Clermont II | 23 | (0) |
| 2015–2016 | Saint-Étienne II | 35 | (2) |
| 2016–2019 | Rodez | 79 | (4) |
| 2019–2021 | Guingamp | 54 | (1) |
| 2021–2025 | Tenerife | 154 | (4) |
| 2025– | Castellón | 45 | (0) |
- * Club domestic league appearances and goals as of 17 October 2026

Jérémy Mellot (born 28 March 1994) is a French professional footballer who plays as a right back for Spanish club CD Castellón.

== Club career ==
In June 2019, Mellot signed with En Avant de Guingamp after being named full-back of the season for Rodez AF. He made his professional debut with Guingamp in a 3–3 Ligue 2 tie with Grenoble Foot 38 on 26 July 2019, scoring the opening goal on his debut.

On 27 June 2021, Mellot moved abroad and signed a two-year deal with Segunda División side CD Tenerife. On 6 July 2025, after suffering relegation, he moved to fellow second division side CD Castellón on a two-year contract.
