= Raúl Sánchez (footballer, born 1997) =

Spanish footballer

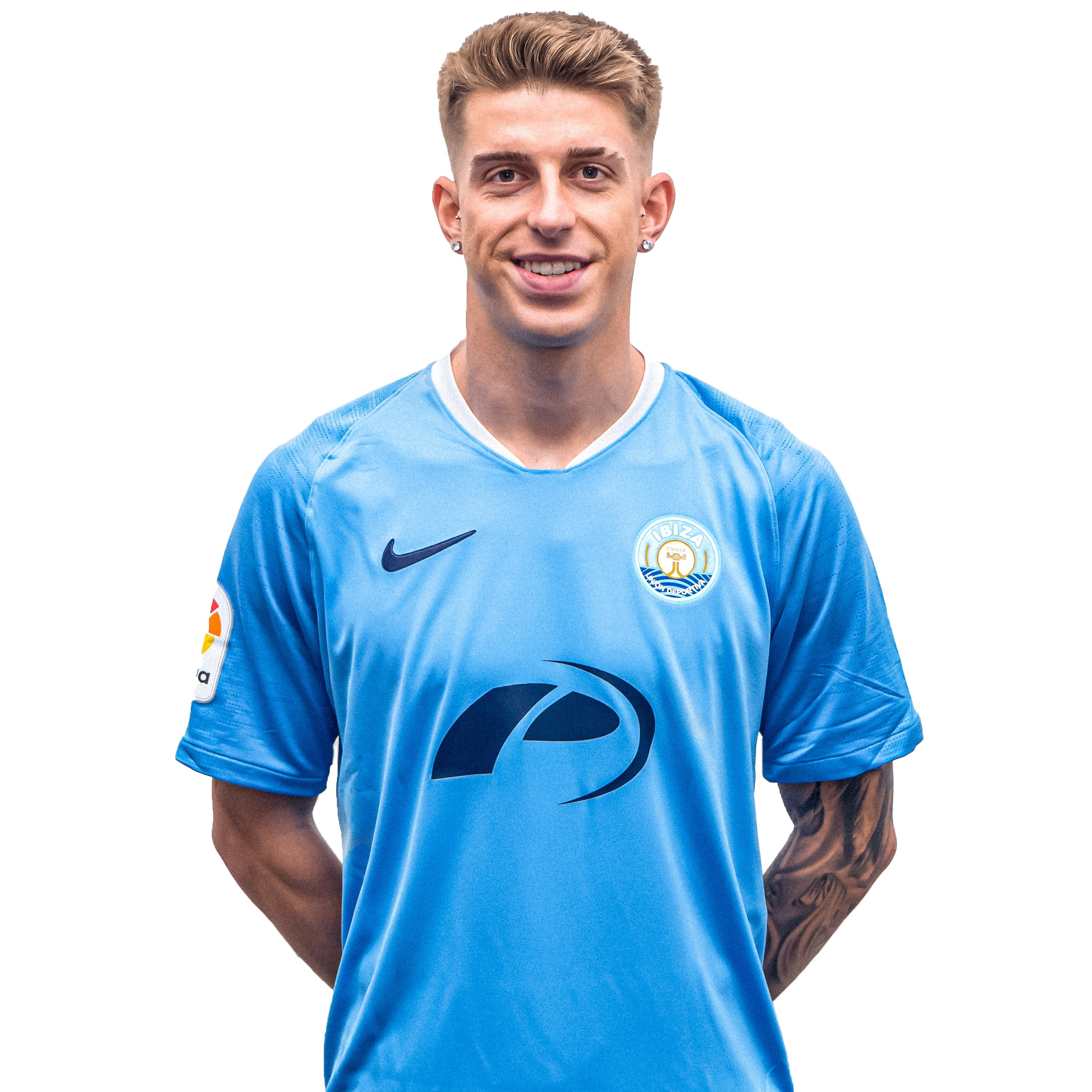
- Sánchez with Ibiza in 2022

Personal information
- Full name: Raúl Sánchez Sánchez
- Date of birth: 8 November 1997 (age 29)
- Place of birth: Madrid, Spain
- Height: 1.88 m (6 ft 2 in)
- Position: Winger

Team information
- Current team: Castellón
- Number: 7

Youth career
- Atlético Casarrubuelos
- 2015–2016: Trival Valderas

Senior career*
Years	Team	Apps	(Gls)
2016–2017	Trival Valderas	29	(6)
2017–2018	Alcorcón B	35	(6)
2018–2021	Leganés B	33	(9)
2019–2020	→ Burgos (loan)	25	(3)
2020–2021	→ Rayo Majadahonda (loan)	23	(5)
2021–2022	Rayo Majadahonda	20	(8)
2022	Ibiza	9	(0)
2022–2025	Castellón	113	(25)
2025–2026	Necaxa	13	(0)
2026–	Castellón	20	(0)
- * Club domestic league appearances and goals as of 17 October 2026

Raúl Sánchez Sánchez (born 8 November 1997) is a Spanish professional footballer who plays for Castellón. Mainly a left winger, he can also play as a left back.

== Club career ==
Born in Madrid, Sánchez represented EF Atlético Casarrubuelos and CF Trival Valderas as a youth. He was promoted to the latter's first team in July 2016, and made his senior debut during the campaign, in Tercera División.

On 27 June 2017, Sánchez joined AD Alcorcón and was assigned to the reserves also in the fourth division. On 8 July of the following year, he moved to another reserve team, CD Leganés B in the same category.

On 25 June 2019, Sánchez signed a professional contract with Lega until 2021, but was loaned to Segunda División B side Burgos CF on 9 August. On 5 October 2020, he moved to fellow third division side CF Rayo Majadahonda also in a temporary deal.

Sánchez left Lega on 1 July 2021, as his contract expired, and signed permanently with Rayo in Primera División RFEF on 10 August 2021. On 13 November, he scored a hat-trick in a 4–2 away win over Internacional de Madrid.

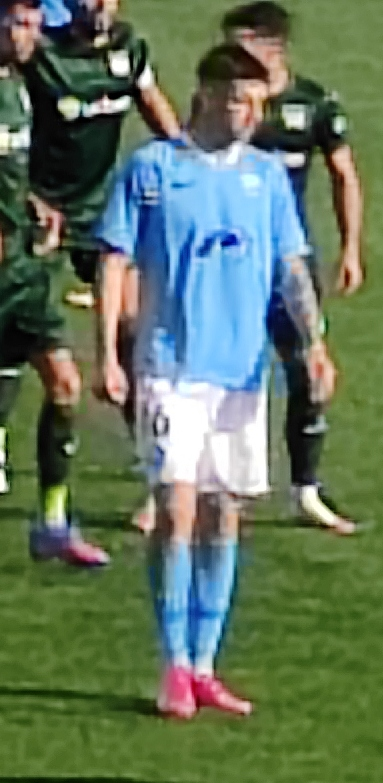
Sánchez with Ibiza in 2022

On 30 January 2022, Sánchez signed a two-and-a-half-year contract with Segunda División side UD Ibiza, after the club paid his release clause. He made his professional debut on 6 March, coming on as a second-half substitute for Miki Villar in a 1–1 away draw against SD Ponferradina.

On 25 August 2022, Sánchez signed a five-year contract with CD Castellón in the third division. He immediately became a regular starter for the side, contributing with seven goals during the 2023–24 season as the club achieved promotion to the second division.

Sánchez scored his first professional goal on 16 September 2024, netting the opener in a 5–2 away routing of UD Almería. The following 16 June, after scoring a career-best 12 goals, he moved abroad for the first time in his career after signing for Liga MX side Club Necaxa.

After a seven-month stay in Mexico, on 20 January 2026, Sánchez returned to Castellón.
