= Ousmane Camara (footballer, born 2001) =

Guinean footballer (born 2001)

Personal information
- Full name: Ousmane Camara
- Date of birth: 20 February 2001 (age 25)
- Place of birth: Conakry, Guinea
- Height: 1.76 m (5 ft 9 in)
- Position: Forward

Team information
- Current team: Castellón
- Number: 9

Youth career
- 2018–2019: Auxerre

Senior career*
Years	Team	Apps	(Gls)
2019–2024	Auxerre II	64	(24)
2022–2024	Auxerre	12	(2)
2024	→ Annecy (loan)	15	(6)
2024–	Castellón	58	(19)

International career^{‡}
2023–	Guinea U23	7	(0)
2024–	Guinea	3	(0)
- * Club domestic league appearances and goals as of 17 October 2026 ‡ National team caps and goals as of 14 October 2025

Ousmane Camara (born 20 February 2001) is a Guinean professional footballer who plays as a forward for Spanish Segunda División club Castellón and the Guinea national team.

== Early life ==
Camara was born in Conakry, Guinea to poverty as the last of 6 children. He was educated by an uncle 50 km from his parents, who taught him to play football. At the age of 17, he decided to leave the country and went to Mali, then Guinea, before landing in Libya where he was imprisoned for 3 months; there he was beaten and saw inmates get killed. He escaped the prison after a fight between inmates and guards, and reached a refugee camp on the Mediterranean. Earning meals by playing football, he left on a raft to Italy with other refugees. Almost drowning on the voyage, he landed in Italy and hid in a toilet on a train to France. The following year, his talents where noted by Auxerre and he joined their youth academy in 2018.

== Club career ==
In 2019, he was promoted to Auxerre's reserves and signed a professional contract that kept him at the club until 2022. In the 2022–23 season, he was one of the top scorers for Auxerre's reserves in the Championnat National 2. On 27 December 2022, he extended his contract with the club for 2+1 years. He made his professional debut with Auxerre as a late substitute in a 3–2 Ligue 1 loss to Monaco on 28 December 2022.

On 24 January 2024, Camara was loaned to Ligue 2 side Annecy. On 28 August, he moved to Spanish Segunda División side Castellón.

== International career ==
Camara was called up to the Guinea U23s in November 2022, but withdrew from the selection. He was called up again for a set of 2023 U-23 Africa Cup of Nations qualification matches in March 2023.

Camara made his debut for the senior Guinea national team on 10 June 2024 in a World Cup qualifier against Mozambique at Ben M'Hamed El Abdi Stadium in El Jadida, Morocco. He substituted Aguibou Camara in the 84th minute of a 1–0 Mozambique victory.
