= CD Castellón B =

Spanish football club

Castellón B
- Full name: Club Deportivo Castellón, S.A.D. "B"
- Founded: 1958 (as Deportivo Castalia CF)
- Ground: Ciudad Deportiva; Castellón, Valencian Community, Spain
- Capacity: 5,000
- President: Haralabos Voulgaris
- Head coach: Juan Casajús
- League: Segunda Federación – Group 2
- 2025–26: Segunda Federación – Group 3, 13th of 18
Home colours	Away colours

Club Deportivo Castellón "B" is a Spanish football team, founded in 1958 and based in Castellón de la Plana, in the Valencian Community, it's the reserve team of CD Castellón. Founded in 1958, they play in Segunda Federación – Group 2.

== Club background ==
- Deportivo Castalia Club de Fútbol - (1958–68)
- Club Deportivo Castellón Aficionados - (1968–80)
- Club Deportivo Castellón "B" - (1980–present)

== Season to season ==
Season	Tier	Division	Place	Copa del Rey
1958–59	5	2ª Reg.		
1959–60	5	2ª Reg.	10th	
1960–61	5	2ª Reg.		
1961–62	5	2ª Reg.	7th	
1962–63	5	2ª Reg.		
1963–64	5	2ª Reg.	10th	
1964–65	5	2ª Reg.	4th	
1965–66	5	2ª Reg.	9th	
1966–67	5	2ª Reg.	10th	
1967–68	5	2ª Reg.	8th	
1968–69	6	3ª Reg.	2nd	
1969–70	6	3ª Reg.	5th	
1970–71	6	2ª Reg.	2nd	
1971–72	6	2ª Reg.		
1972–73	5	1ª Reg.	3rd	
1973–74	5	1ª Reg.	4th	
1974–75	5	1ª Reg.	7th	
1975–76	5	1ª Reg.	11th	
1976–77	5	1ª Reg.	15th	
1977–78	6	1ª Reg.	1st	

Season	Tier	Division	Place	Copa del Rey
1978–79	5	Reg. Pref.	19th	
1979–80	6	1ª Reg.	7th	
1980–81	6	1ª Reg.	2nd	
1981–82	6	1ª Reg.	1st	
1982–83	5	Reg. Pref.	5th	
1983–84	5	Reg. Pref.	3rd	
1984–85	4	3ª	6th	
1985–86	4	3ª	11th	
1986–87	4	3ª	16th	
1987–88	4	3ª	19th	
1988–89	5	Reg. Pref.	15th	
1989–90	5	Reg. Pref.	6th	
1990–91	5	Reg. Pref.	11th	DNP
1991–92	5	Reg. Pref.	12th	DNP
1992–93	6	1ª Reg.	2nd	DNP
1993–94	5	Reg. Pref.	13th	DNP
1994–95	5	Reg. Pref.	14th	DNP
1995–96	5	Reg. Pref.	6th	DNP
1996–97	5	Reg. Pref.	4th	DNP
1997–98	5	Reg. Pref.	9th	DNP

Season	Tier	Division	Place
1998–99	5	Reg. Pref.	5th
1999–2000	5	Reg. Pref.	2nd
2000–01	4	3ª	13th
2001–02	4	3ª	15th
2002–03	4	3ª	16th
2003–04	4	3ª	19th
2004–05	5	Reg. Pref.	1st
2005–06	4	3ª	9th
2006–07	4	3ª	9th
2007–08	4	3ª	14th
2008–09	4	3ª	18th
2009–10	5	Reg. Pref.	4th
2010–11	5	Reg. Pref.	4th
2011–12	5	Reg. Pref.	9th
2012–13	5	Reg. Pref.	16th
2013–14	6	1ª Reg.	1st
2014–15	5	Reg. Pref.	11th
2015–16	5	Reg. Pref.	6th
2016–17	5	Reg. Pref.	5th
2017–18	5	Reg. Pref.	8th

Season	Tier	Division	Place
2018–19	5	Reg. Pref.	8th
2019–20	5	Reg. Pref.	8th
2020–21	5	Reg. Pref.	3rd
2021–22	5	3ª RFEF	13th
2022–23	5	3ª Fed.	10th
2023–24	5	3ª Fed.	14th
2024–25	5	3ª Fed.	1st
2025–26	4	2ª Fed.	13th
2026–27	4	2ª Fed.	

- 2 seasons in Segunda Federación
- 12 seasons in Tercera División
- 4 seasons in Tercera Federación/Tercera División RFEF

== Current squad ==
As of 7 September 2026

Note: Flags indicate national team as defined under FIFA eligibility rules; some limited exceptions apply. Players may hold more than one non-FIFA nationality.

No.	Pos.	Nation	Player
1	GK	ESP	Iván Biarge
3	DF	CIV	Guy Konan
4	DF	ESP	Iago Parente
5	DF	ESP	Guillem Trilla
6	MF	ESP	Nacho Vizcaíno
7	FW	ESP	Fer Martínez
8	MF	ESP	Bruno Partal
9	FW	ESP	Miguel Ferrer
10	FW	ESP	Jacobo de Oro
11	FW	ESP	Derek Cuevas
14	MF	ESP	Enric Gisbert
15	MF	USA	Axel Pérez
16	DF	ESP	Andrés Caro

No.	Pos.	Nation	Player
17	FW	ESP	Nico Font
18	MF	ESP	Manu Portela
19	FW	ESP	Julián Rodríguez
20	MF	ESP	Gaizka Alboniga-Menor
21	FW	ESP	Dennis Almiñana
22	FW	ESP	Jaime Pérez
23	DF	ESP	Antoni Fenollar
25	GK	ESP	Carlos Calavia
27	DF	ESP	José Nadal
28	DF	ESP	Óscar Domingo
30	FW	ESP	Óscar Albiol
33	MF	KOR	Jae-hyeon Lee
35	GK	ESP	Jorge Calduch

=== From Youth Academy ===
Note: Flags indicate national team as defined under FIFA eligibility rules; some limited exceptions apply. Players may hold more than one non-FIFA nationality.

No.	Pos.	Nation	Player

== Notable former players ==
- (Spain) Ángel Dealbert
- (Spain) Manuel Arana
- (Spain) Pau Franch
- (Spain) José Ferrer
- (Spain) César Remón

== Notable former coaches ==
- (Spain) Fernando Giner
