= Nou Estadi Castàlia =

Multi-purpose stadium in Spain

Estadio Municipal de Castalia
- Estadio Skyfi Castalia
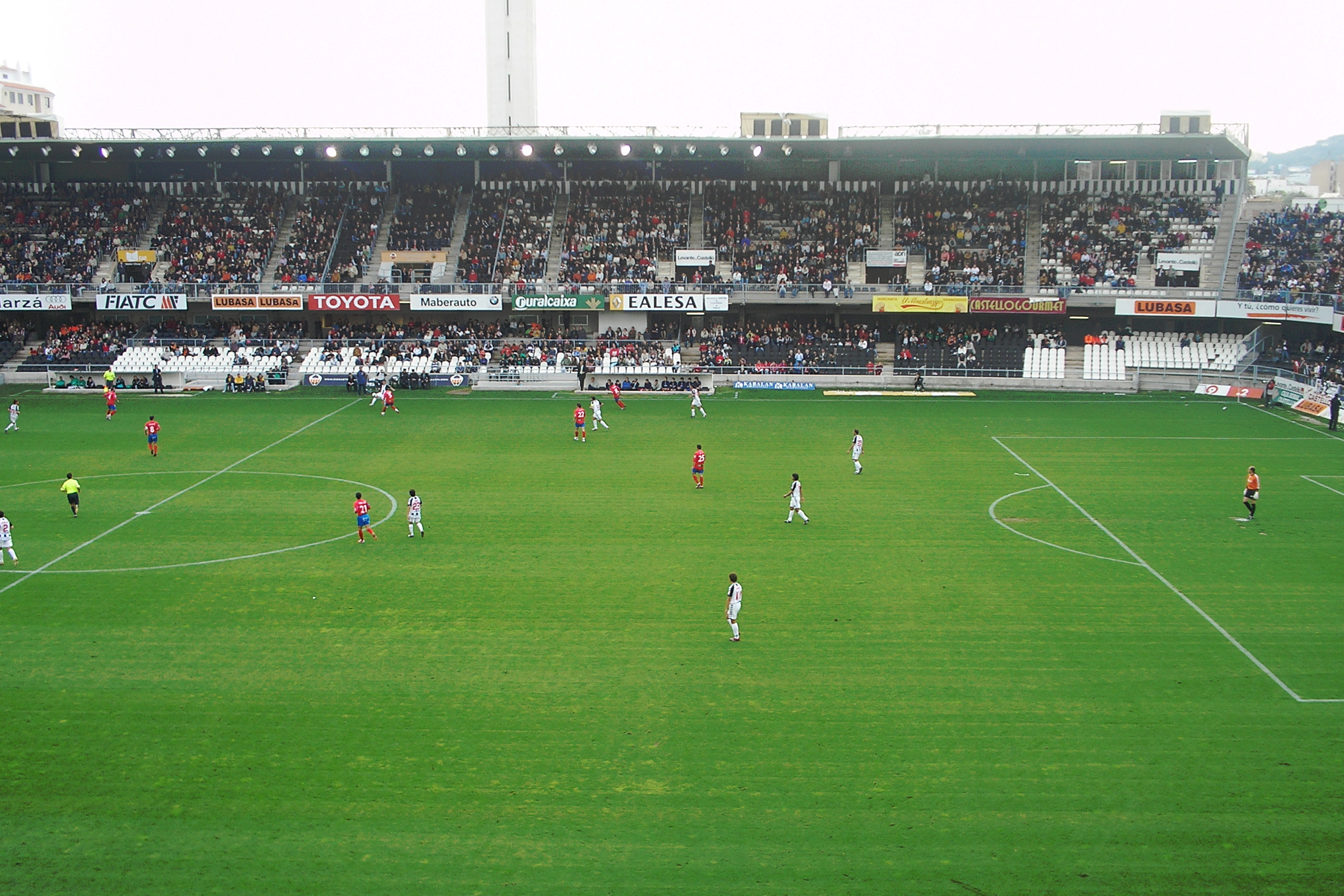
- Interactive map of Estadio Municipal de Castalia
- Location: Castelló de la Plana, Spain
- Coordinates: 39°59′46″N 0°02′20″W
- Owner: Ayuntamiento de Castellón
- Operator: Ayuntamiento de Castellón
- Capacity: 15,500
- Field size: 102 metres (112 yd) x 70 metres (77 yd)

Construction
- Opened: 17 June 1987

Tenants
- CD Castellón; Spain national football team (selected matches)

Estadio Municipal de Castalia is a multi-purpose stadium in Castellón de la Plana, Spain. It is currently used mostly for football matches and is the home ground of CD Castellón. The stadium holds 15,500 (all-seater) and was built in 1987, replacing the original Estadi Castàlia which stood on this site, but at 90° to the current layout. The pitch size is 102x70m.
