= Israel Suero =

Spanish footballer (born 1994)

Personal information
- Full name: Israel Suero Fernández
- Date of birth: 12 April 1994 (age 32)
- Place of birth: Madrid, Spain
- Height: 1.72 m (5 ft 8 in)
- Position: Midfielder

Team information
- Current team: Castellón
- Number: 10

Youth career
- 2001–2008: Real Madrid
- 2008–2010: Atlético Madrid
- 2010–2012: Rayo Majadahonda

Senior career*
Years	Team	Apps	(Gls)
2012–2014	Rayo Majadahonda	35	(6)
2014–2016	Rayo Vallecano B	45	(5)
2017	CSC 03 Kassel	12	(8)
2017–2018	Eintracht Stadtallendorf	35	(6)
2018–2023	SV Elversberg	126	(54)
2023–	Castellón	106	(24)
- * Club domestic league appearances and goals as of 17 October 2026

Israel Suero Fernández (born 12 April 1994) is a Spanish footballer who plays as a midfielder for CD Castellón.

== Career ==
Born in Madrid, Suero joined Real Madrid's La Fábrica at the age of eight. He left the club at the age of fourteen, and subsequently represented Atlético Madrid and CF Rayo Majadahonda as a youth.

In July 2014, after spending two seasons with the first team of the Majariegos in Tercera División, Suero moved to Rayo Vallecano and was assigned to the reserves also in the fourth division. He featured for the first team in a pre-season match against UD Las Palmas in August 2015, but returned to the B's before leaving in July 2016.

In March 2017, Suero moved abroad and joined German Verbandsliga Hessen-Süd side CSC 03 Kassel; he was already living in the country, but did not have a club. On 2 July, he was announced at TSV Eintracht Stadtallendorf of the Regionalliga Südwest.

On 26 June 2018, Suero signed for SV Elversberg. He renewed his link on 2 July 2021, and helped the club in their promotion to 3. Liga at the end of the season.

Suero made his professional debut on 13 August 2022, coming on as a second-half substitute for Jannik Rochelt in a 5–0 home routing of FSV Zwickau. He scored his first goal on 8 October, netting his side's third in a 3–0 home win over MSV Duisburg.

On 31 January 2023, Suero returned to his home country and signed for Primera Federación side CD Castellón. A backup option under Albert Rudé, he started the 2023–24 season as a starter under Dick Schreuder.

After struggling with injuries, Suero scored six times in 21 appearances overall as the club achieved promotion to Segunda División, and had his contract automatically renewed for a further year on 1 July 2024.
