= Alberto Jiménez (footballer) =

Spanish footballer

Personal information
- Full name: Alberto Jiménez Benítez
- Date of birth: 15 November 1992 (age 33)
- Place of birth: La Oliva, Spain
- Height: 1.86 m (6 ft 1 in)
- Position: Centre back

Team information
- Current team: Castellón
- Number: 5

Youth career
- Fuerteventura
- 2009–2011: Tenerife

Senior career*
Years	Team	Apps	(Gls)
2011–2013	Tenerife B	57	(5)
2012–2022	Tenerife	194	(4)
2014–2015	→ Valencia B (loan)	24	(1)
2022	→ Albacete (loan)	17	(0)
2023	Córdoba	10	(0)
2023–	Castellón	114	(5)
- * Club domestic league appearances and goals as of 17 October 2026

Alberto Jiménez Benítez (born 15 November 1992) is a Spanish professional footballer who plays for CD Castellón. Mainly a central defender, he can also play as a defensive midfielder.

== Football career ==
Born in La Oliva, Province of Las Palmas, Alberto finished his formation with local CD Tenerife, making his senior debuts with the B-team in the fourth division. In his second season as a senior he appeared 17 times with the main squad (13 in the league) and scored three goals, achieving promotion to the second level via the play-offs.

On 18 August 2013 Alberto played his first game as a professional, coming on as a late substitute in a 0–1 away loss against AD Alcorcón. On 13 August of the following year he renewed his contract for a further season, being immediately loaned to Valencia CF Mestalla in a season-long deal.

On 10 November 2015, after returning from loan, Alberto extended his link until 2018. He scored his first professional goal on 15 April 2017, netting his team's second in a 3–3 home draw against Girona FC.

On 28 June 2017, after establishing himself as a starter, Alberto renewed his contract until 2020. On 17 May 2020, he further extended his contract for three years.

On 10 January 2022, after featuring in only 87 minutes for the first half of the campaign, Alberto was loaned to Primera División RFEF side Albacete Balompié until June.
