= CD Castellón =

Association football team in Spain

Castellón
- Full name: Club Deportivo Castellón, S.A.D.
- Nicknames: Orelluts; Albinegres; Albinegros
- Founded: 20 July 1922; 104 years ago
- Stadium: Estadio SkyFi Castalia
- Capacity: 15,500
- Owner(s): Bob Voulgaris (96%); Sentimiento Albinegro (4%)
- President: Bob Voulgaris
- Head coach: Pablo Hernández
- League: Segunda División
- 2025–26: Segunda División, 6th of 22
- Website: cdcastellon.com
| Home colours | Away colours | Third colours |

Club Deportivo Castellón, S.A.D. is a professional Spanish football team based in Castellón de la Plana, in the Valencian Community. Founded on 20 July 1922, it currently plays in Segunda División, holding home games at Nou Estadi Castàlia, which has a capacity of 15,500 seats.

== History ==
Chart of Club Deportivo Castellón league performance 1929–present.

Football first appeared in the town in 1911, and after a period of time under the consecutive denominations "Deportivo", "Castalia", "Gimnástico", "Cultural" and "Cervantes", Club Deportivo Castellón was founded on 22 July 1922. After a short period of inactivity in the 1930s (which saw SC de La Plana and Athletic Club Castellón take proeminence of football in the city), the club returned in 1939, already in the second division.

The club featured periodically in the top flight, finishing fifth in 1972–73 and adding a Cup final appearance with a team featuring Vicente del Bosque, who later moved to Real Madrid, serving the club as both a player and coach.

On 29 August 1991, in an extraordinary assembly, the conversion of the club to S.A.D. was approved. The first team had just relegated into division two, and would drop another level to the third three years later, in a spell which would last more than one decade.

In the 2004–05 season, Castellón finished fourth in Segunda B, eventually winning its promotion playoffs (both matches) and achieving a return to the silver category. The club's stint in the division would last five years, as relegation would befall in 2009–10, with the Valencian Community outfit ranking last, 13 points behind the following team.

On 18 July 2011, due to the team not paying its players, Castellón was excluded from the third division, being relegated to the fourth. In June 2017, former player Pablo Hernández became joint owner of the club, leading a consortium alongside Angel Dealbert, businessman Vicente Montesinos and others.

On 21 March 2018, Castellón beat the record of seasonal tickets in the fourth division previously held by Real Oviedo with 12,700, establishing the new record at 12,867. On 24 June 2018, it returned to the third tier after a seven-year absence. On 26 July 2020, Castellón promoted back to second division after 10 years by beating Cornellà in final play off promotion, but they were immediately relegated in the 2020–21 season.

On 5 May 2024, Castellón were promoted back to the second division after three years in the third tier, after Córdoba was defeated by already-relegated Recreativo Granada. In the 2024–25 season they finished in 17th place, narrowly avoiding relegation by two positions. Despite a challenging campaign, the team managed to retain their status in the division. A stronger season followed in 2025–26, as the club finished sixth to take part in the promotion play-offs, losing narrowly to Almería.

== Season to season ==
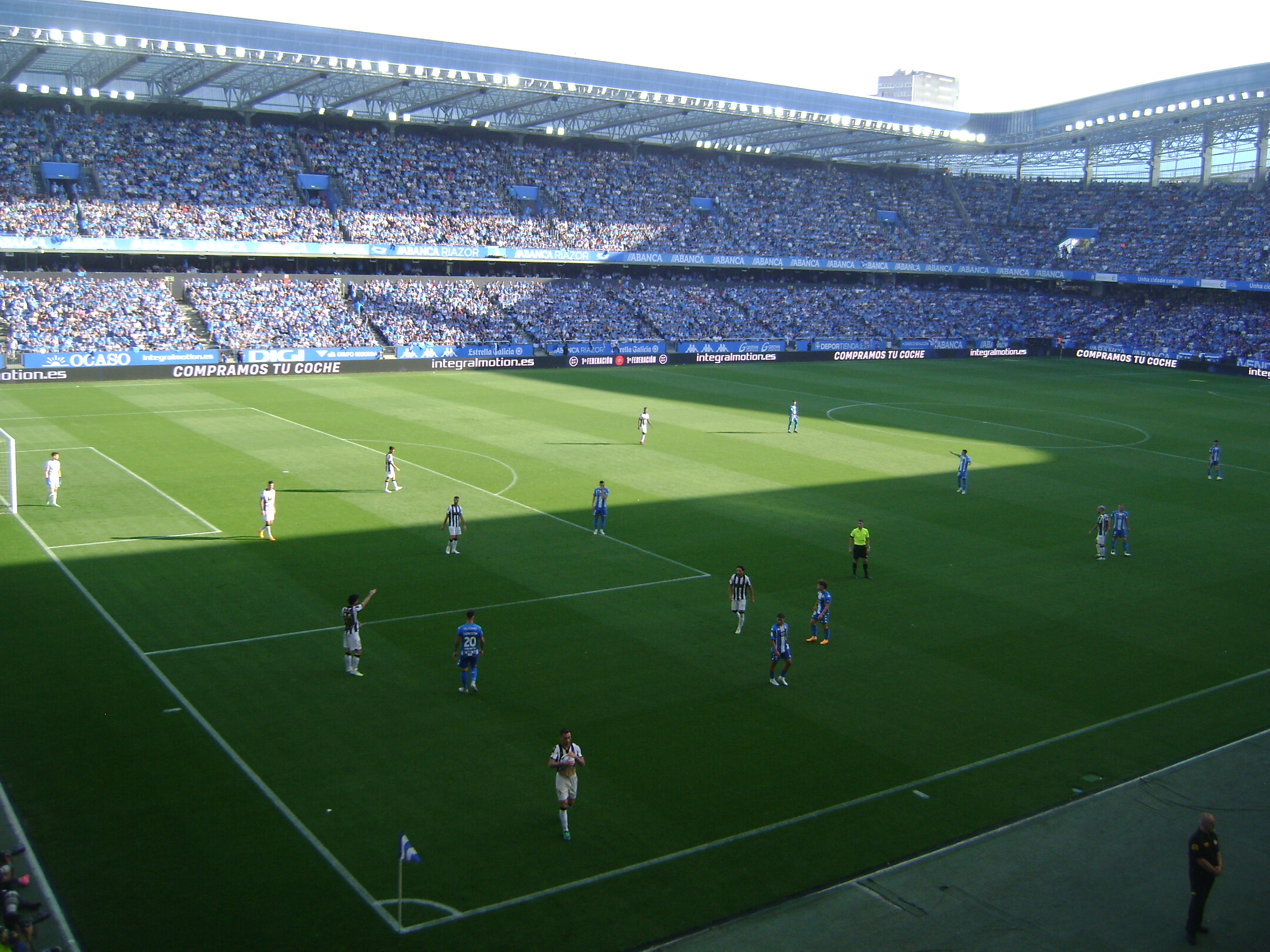
Deportivo de La Coruña vs. Castellón.

| Season | Tier | Division | Place | Copa del Rey |
|---|---|---|---|---|
| 1929 | 3 | 3ª | 3rd | Quarter-finals |
| 1929–30 | 3 | 3ª | 1st | Round of 16 |
| 1930–31 | 2 | 2ª | 5th | Quarter-finals |
| 1931–32 | 2 | 2ª | 7th | Round of 16 |
| 1932–33 | 2 | 2ª | 10th | Round of 16 |
| 1933–34 | 4 | 1ª Reg. | (R) | — |
| 1934–35 | DNP | | | — |
| 1935–36 | DNP | | | — |
| 1939–40 | 2 | 2ª | 4th | — |
| 1940–41 | 2 | 2ª | 1st | Round of 16 |
| 1941–42 | 1 | 1ª | 8th | Round of 16 |
| 1942–43 | 1 | 1ª | 4th | Round of 16 |
| 1943–44 | 1 | 1ª | 5th | Round of 16 |
| 1944–45 | 1 | 1ª | 8th | Quarter-finals |
| 1945–46 | 1 | 1ª | 8th | First round |
| 1946–47 | 1 | 1ª | 14th | Quarter-finals |
| 1947–48 | 2 | 2ª | 12th | Quarter-finals |
| 1948–49 | 2 | 2ª | 8th | Fourth round |
| 1949–50 | 2 | 2ª | 16th | Second round |
| 1950–51 | 3 | 3ª | 3rd | — |

| Season | Tier | Division | Place | Copa del Rey |
|---|---|---|---|---|
| 1951–52 | 3 | 3ª | 6th | — |
| 1952–53 | 3 | 3ª | 1st | — |
| 1953–54 | 2 | 2ª | 5th | — |
| 1954–55 | 2 | 2ª | 12th | — |
| 1955–56 | 2 | 2ª | 16th | — |
| 1956–57 | 2 | 2ª | 20th | — |
| 1957–58 | 3 | 3ª | 2nd | — |
| 1958–59 | 3 | 3ª | 12th | — |
| 1959–60 | 3 | 3ª | 2nd | — |
| 1960–61 | 2 | 2ª | 13th | Round of 32 |
| 1961–62 | 3 | 3ª | 3rd | — |
| 1962–63 | 3 | 3ª | 10th | — |
| 1963–64 | 3 | 3ª | 1st | — |
| 1964–65 | 3 | 3ª | 1st | — |
| 1965–66 | 3 | 3ª | 1st | — |
| 1966–67 | 2 | 2ª | 3rd | Round of 32 |
| 1967–68 | 2 | 2ª | 10th | Round of 32 |
| 1968–69 | 3 | 3ª | 1st | — |
| 1969–70 | 2 | 2ª | 11th | Round of 32 |
| 1970–71 | 2 | 2ª | 6th | Round of 32 |

| Season | Tier | Division | Place | Copa del Rey |
|---|---|---|---|---|
| 1971–72 | 2 | 2ª | 2nd | Round of 16 |
| 1972–73 | 1 | 1ª | 5th | Runners-up |
| 1973–74 | 1 | 1ª | 16th | Round of 16 |
| 1974–75 | 2 | 2ª | 6th | Fourth round |
| 1975–76 | 2 | 2ª | 12th | First round |
| 1976–77 | 2 | 2ª | 14th | Second round |
| 1977–78 | 2 | 2ª | 14th | Third round |
| 1978–79 | 2 | 2ª | 11th | First round |
| 1979–80 | 2 | 2ª | 5th | Fourth round |
| 1980–81 | 2 | 2ª | 1st | Fourth round |
| 1981–82 | 1 | 1ª | 18th | Third round |
| 1982–83 | 2 | 2ª | 15th | First round |
| 1983–84 | 2 | 2ª | 10th | Round of 16 |
| 1984–85 | 2 | 2ª | 12th | Quarter-finals |
| 1985–86 | 2 | 2ª | 5th | Round of 16 |
| 1986–87 | 2 | 2ª | 4th | Fourth round |
| 1987–88 | 2 | 2ª | 11th | Quarter-finals |
| 1988–89 | 2 | 2ª | 1st | Third round |
| 1989–90 | 1 | 1ª | 14th | Second round |
| 1990–91 | 1 | 1ª | 19th | Fourth round |

| Season | Tier | Division | Place | Copa del Rey |
|---|---|---|---|---|
| 1991–92 | 2 | 2ª | 15th | Round of 16 |
| 1992–93 | 2 | 2ª | 10th | Fourth round |
| 1993–94 | 2 | 2ª | 17th | Fourth round |
| 1994–95 | 3 | 2ª B | 4th | Second round |
| 1995–96 | 3 | 2ª B | 6th | First round |
| 1996–97 | 3 | 2ª B | 9th | First round |
| 1997–98 | 3 | 2ª B | 5th | — |
| 1998–99 | 3 | 2ª B | 9th | — |
| 1999–2000 | 3 | 2ª B | 7th | — |
| 2000–01 | 3 | 2ª B | 10th | First round |
| 2001–02 | 3 | 2ª B | 13th | First round |
| 2002–03 | 3 | 2ª B | 1st | — |
| 2003–04 | 3 | 2ª B | 4th | Second round |
| 2004–05 | 3 | 2ª B | 4th | Second round |
| 2005–06 | 2 | 2ª | 12th | First round |
| 2006–07 | 2 | 2ª | 14th | Round of 32 |
| 2007–08 | 2 | 2ª | 5th | Second round |
| 2008–09 | 2 | 2ª | 7th | Round of 32 |
| 2009–10 | 2 | 2ª | 22nd | Second round |
| 2010–11 | 3 | 2ª B | 10th | Second round |

| Season | Tier | Division | Place | Copa del Rey |
|---|---|---|---|---|
| 2011–12 | 4 | 3ª | 9th | — |
| 2012–13 | 4 | 3ª | 4th | — |
| 2013–14 | 4 | 3ª | 15th | — |
| 2014–15 | 4 | 3ª | 1st | — |
| 2015–16 | 4 | 3ª | 3rd | Second round |
| 2016–17 | 4 | 3ª | 4th | — |
| 2017–18 | 4 | 3ª | 2nd | — |
| 2018–19 | 3 | 2ª B | 15th | Second round |
| 2019–20 | 3 | 2ª B | 1st | First round |
| 2020–21 | 2 | 2ª | 21st | Second round |
| 2021–22 | 3 | 1ª RFEF | 13th | Second round |
| 2022–23 | 3 | 1ª Fed. | 3rd | — |
| 2023–24 | 3 | 1ª Fed. | 1st | Round of 32 |
| 2024–25 | 2 | 2ª | 17th | Second round |
| 2025–26 | 2 | 2ª | 6th | First round |
| 2026–27 | 2 | 2ª | | TBD |

- 11 seasons in La Liga
- 44 seasons in Segunda División
- 3 seasons in Primera Federación
- 14 seasons in Segunda División B
- 21 seasons in Tercera División

== Current squad ==
As of 3 September 2026

Note: Flags indicate national team as defined under FIFA eligibility rules; some limited exceptions apply. Players may hold more than one non-FIFA nationality.

| No. | Pos. | Nation | Player |
|---|---|---|---|
| 1 | GK | KOS | Amir Saipi |
| 2 | DF | ESP | Juanjo Nieto |
| 3 | DF | ITA | Fabrizio Brignani |
| 4 | DF | ARG | Agustín Sienra |
| 5 | DF | ESP | Alberto Jiménez |
| 6 | MF | COL | Matías Orozco (on loan from Brighton & Hove Albion) |
| 7 | FW | ESP | Raúl Sánchez |
| 8 | MF | ESP | Diego Barri |
| 9 | FW | GUI | Ousmane Camara |
| 10 | MF | ESP | Israel Suero |
| 11 | DF | ITA | Federico Ceccherini |
| 12 | DF | ESP | Lucas Alcázar |
| 13 | GK | BEL | Romain Matthys |
| 14 | FW | ESP | Iñigo Córdoba |
| 15 | DF | GRE | Ilias Kostis |

| No. | Pos. | Nation | Player |
|---|---|---|---|
| 16 | FW | DEN | Adam Jakobsen |
| 17 | MF | ESP | Fran Castillo |
| 18 | FW | ESP | Pablo Santiago |
| 19 | FW | MAR | Hamza Bellari |
| 20 | DF | ESP | Tincho Conde |
| 21 | MF | ESP | Álvaro Martín |
| 22 | DF | FRA | Jérémy Mellot |
| 23 | FW | ESP | Álvaro García |
| 24 | FW | ANG | David Nzanza |
| 25 | MF | NED | Jari Vlak |
| 26 | FW | POR | Rodrigo Rêgo (on loan from Brighton & Hove Albion) |
| 27 | MF | ITA | Antonio Gala |
| 30 | DF | POL | Michał Willmann |
| 35 | GK | ESP | Sergi Torner |

=== Reserve team ===
Note: Flags indicate national team as defined under FIFA eligibility rules; some limited exceptions apply. Players may hold more than one non-FIFA nationality.

| No. | Pos. | Nation | Player |
|---|---|---|---|
| 31 | FW | ESP | Óscar Albiol |
| 32 | MF | USA | Axel Pérez |
| 33 | FW | ESP | Miguel Ferrer |

| No. | Pos. | Nation | Player |
|---|---|---|---|
| 34 | FW | ESP | Jaime Pérez |
| 36 | DF | ESP | José Nadal |
| 38 | MF | ESP | Manu Portela |

=== Out on loan ===
Note: Flags indicate national team as defined under FIFA eligibility rules; some limited exceptions apply. Players may hold more than one non-FIFA nationality.

| No. | Pos. | Nation | Player |
|---|---|---|---|
| — | DF | MAR | Ismael Fadel (at Ibiza until 30 June 2027) |
| — | DF | ESP | José Albert (at Zamora until 30 June 2027) |
| — | FW | BRA | Douglas Aurélio (at Huesca until 30 June 2027) |

| No. | Pos. | Nation | Player |
|---|---|---|---|
| — | FW | USA | Nick Markanich (at Houston Dynamo until 31 December 2026) |
| — | FW | ESP | Serpeta (at Águilas until 30 June 2027) |

=== Current technical staff ===
| Position | Staff |
|---|---|
| Head coach | (Spain) Pablo Hernández |
| Assistant coach | (Spain) Sergi Ripollés |
| Goalkeeping coach | (England) Jack Stern |
| Tactical analyst | (Spain) Paco Urdiain (Netherlands) Dennis Van der Meulen |
| Set piece specialist | (Norway) Mathias Haugaasen |
| Delegate | (Spain) Bernardo Cogollos |
| Match delegate | (Spain) José María Gil |
| Fitness coach | (Spain) Joan Torné |
| Assistant fitness coach | (Spain) Alberto Liñán |
| Chief of medical services | (Spain) Alejandro Vázquez |
| Doctor | (Spain) Santiago Rincón |
| Sports traumatologist | (Spain) Álvaro Acebrón |
| Rehab fitness coach | (Spain) Rafael Soler |
| Physiotherapist | (Spain) Galder Saiz (Spain) Carles Cerdá |
| Nutritionist | (Spain) Javier Sánchez |
| Equipment manager | (Spain) Óscar Armillas (Spain) Iker Porcar |

Last updated: 11 August 2026
Source: CD Castellón (in Spanish)

== Honours ==
- Segunda División: 1940–41, 1980–81, 1988–89
- Segunda División B: 2002–03
- Tercera División: 1929–30, 1952–53, 1963–64, 1964–65, 1965–66, 1968–69 (third level until 1976–77)
- Campeonato de Valencia: 1928–29, 1929–30
- Copa de la Liga (second division): 1983–84
- Copa del Rey: Runner-up 1972–73

== Notable players ==
- (Argentina) Leonardo Ulloa
- (Argentina) Mario Cabrera
- (Argentina) Dani Pendín
- (Argentina) Gustavo Reggi
- (Belarus) Ihar Hurynovich
- (Bosnia and Herzegovina) Bernard Barnjak
- (Colombia) Mauricio Romero
- (Croatia) Mladen Mladenović
- (Equatorial Guinea) Sergio Barila
- (Equatorial Guinea) Juan Epitié
- (Equatorial Guinea) Juvenal
- (Equatorial Guinea) Emilio Nsue
- (Equatorial Guinea) José Luis Rondo
- (France) Henri Dumat
- (Japan) Kenji Fukuda
- (Nigeria) Nduka Ugbade
- (Russia) (Commonwealth of Independent States) (Soviet Union) (Ukraine) Igor Dobrovolski
- (Serbia) Dragan Punišić
- (Serbia) Rade Tošić
- (Spain) Pichi Alonso
- (Spain) José Araquistáin
- (Spain) Pascual Babiloni
- (Spain) Luis Cela
- (Spain) Ángel Dealbert
- (Socialist Federal Republic of Yugoslavia) (Serbia) Božur Matejić
- (Spain) Vicente del Bosque
- (Spain) José Ferrer
- (Spain) Miguel Ángel Lotina
- (Spain) César Martín
- (Spain) Gaizka Mendieta
- (Spain) Miguel Ángel
- (Spain) Juan Planelles
- (Spain) Roberto
- (Spain) Antonio Ruiz
- (Spain) Enrique Saura
- (Spain) Rubén Torrecilla
- (Spain) Pablo Hernández
- (Uruguay) Walter Peletti
- (Socialist Federal Republic of Yugoslavia) (Serbia) Đorđe Vujkov
- (Romania) Florin Andone
