= List of foreign Segunda División players =

Foreign players in the second tier Spanish national football league

This is a list of the foreign players in the Segunda División. To be in the list players must have played at least one game in the Segunda División.

The players in Bold are those who are currently playing in Segunda División.

== Albania ==
- Iván Balliu – Barcelona B, Almería – 2010–13, 2019–21
- **Keidi Bare** – Málaga, Espanyol, **Zaragoza** – 2018–21, 2023–
- Vullnet Basha – Real Zaragoza, Ponferradina, UCAM Murcia – 2014–17
- Ervin Fakaj – Toledo – 1997–98
- Kleandro Lleshi – Cartagena – 2020–21
- Elvir Maloku – Gimnàstic – 2016–17
- Rey Manaj – Granada, Albacete – 2017–20
- Armando Sadiku – Málaga, Las Palmas, Cartagena – 2019–20, 2021–23
- Laorent Shabani – Andorra – 2023–24
- Myrto Uzuni – Granada – 2022–23, 2024–25

== Algeria ==
- Rachid Aït-Atmane – Gijón, Tenerife – 2014–15, 2016–18
- Mohamed Benkhemassa – Málaga – 2019–21
- Hameur Bouazza – Racing Santander – 2012–13
- Liassine Cadamuro – Mallorca, Osasuna, Gimnàstic – 2013–15, 2018–19
- Karim Chaban – Albacete – 2022–23
- Walid Cherfa – Gimnàstic, Albacete – 2008–11
- Kamel Ghilas – Celta Vigo – 2008–09
- Foued Kadir – Betis, Getafe, Alcorcón – 2014–15, 2016–18
- Mehdi Lacen – Deportivo Alavés, Getafe, Málaga – 2006–08, 2016–17, 2018–19
- Ali Radjel – Numancia – 2019–20
- Abderrahman Rebbach – Deportivo Alavés – 2022–23
- Yanis Rahmani – Almería, Lugo, Málaga, Eibar, Tenerife – 2019–25
- Akim Zedadka – Real Zaragoza – 2023–24
- **Luca Zidane** – Racing Santander, Rayo Vallecano, Eibar, **Granada** – 2019–21, 2022–

== Andorra ==
- **Iker Álvarez** – Villarreal CF B, **Córdoba** – 2022–24, 2025–
- Marc Bernaus – Barcelona B, Toledo, Gimnàstic, Las Palmas, Getafe, Elche, Polideportivo Ejido, Girona – 1996–97, 1998–2000, 2001–10
- Ildefons Lima – Las Palmas, Polideportivo Ejido, Rayo Vallecano – 2002–05
- Justo Ruiz – Bilbao Athletic, Eibar – 1987–88, 1989–93

== Angola ==
- Jérémie Bela – Albacete – 2017–19
- Anderson Cruz – Fuenlabrada – 2019–20
- **Zito Luvumbo** – **Mallorca** – 2026–
- Manucho – Real Valladolid, Rayo Vallecano – 2010–11, 2016–18
- Jorge Mendonça – Deportivo La Coruña – 1958–59
- Randy Nteka – Fuenlabrada – 2019–21
- **David Nzanza** – **Castellón** – 2026–
- Jonás Ramalho – Bilbao Athletic, Girona – 2013–17, 2019–21
- Rudy – Deportivo La Coruña – 2013–14

== Argentina ==
- José Acciari – Murcia, Córdoba, Elche, Girona – 2001–02, 2005–06, 2007–14
- Nicolás Aguirre – Granada – 2018–19
- Cristian Darío Álvarez – Real Zaragoza – 2017–24
- Matías Alustiza – Albacete – 2007–08
- Cristian Osvaldo Álvarez – Córdoba, Tenerife – 2004–06, 2007–09
- Gabriel Amato – Betis, Levante – 2000–01, 2002–03
- Horacio Ameli – Rayo Vallecano – 1997–98
- Franco Amoroso – Xerez – 2012–13
- **Esteban Andrada** – **Real Zaragoza** – 2025–
- Daniel Aquino – Real Murcia, Mérida, Real Betis – 1989–91, 1992–94, 1996–97
- Sergio Araujo – Barcelona B, Las Palmas – 2012–13, 2014–15, 2018–20
- Mariano Armentano – Elche – 1999–2000, 2002–03
- Emiliano Armenteros – Sevilla Atlético, Rayo Vallecano – 2007–09, 2010–11, 2017–18
- Joaquín Arzura – Osasuna, Almería – 2017–19
- Martín Astudillo – Deportivo Alavés – 2003–05, 2006–09
- Lucas Aveldaño – Mallorca, Tenerife – 2015–18
- Ezequiel Ávila – Huesca – 2017–18
- Federico Azcárate – Real Murcia – 2004–05
- Juan Manuel Azconzábal – Las Palmas – 2007–08
- Luciano Balbi – Real Valladolid, Extremadura – 2016–17, 2018–19
- Matías Ballini – Girona – 2011–12
- Mariano Barbosa – Las Palmas – 2010–14
- Jerónimo Barrales – Recreativo – 2009–10
- Fernando Barrientos – Villarreal B – 2011–12
- Federico Basavilbaso – Tenerife – 1999–2001, 2002–04
- José Belforti – Lugo – 2012–13
- Eduardo Berizzo – Celta Vigo – 2004–05
- Hernán Bernardello – Almería, Deportivo Alavés – 2011–12, 2015–16
- Federico Bessone – Gimnàstic – 2007–08
- Leonardo Biagini – Rayo Vallecano, Gijón, Albacete – 2003–07
- Matías Biscay – Compostela – 1999–2001
- David Bisconti – Badajoz – 1998–99
- Mariano Bíttolo – Córdoba, Cartagena – 2016–18
- Albano Bizzarri – Real Valladolid – 2004–06
- Aitor Blanco – Mirandés – 2012–13
- Lautaro Blanco – Elche – 2023–24
- Gustavo Blanco Leschuk – Málaga, Real Oviedo, Eibar – 2018–19, 2020–23
- Roberto Bonano – Deportivo Alavés – 2004–05, 2006–08
- Fabián Bonhoff – Castellón, Palamós – 1988–89, 1990–93
- Leonardo Borzani – Las Palmas – 2010–11
- Lucas Boyé – Elche – 2023–24
- Lautaro Blanco – Elche – 2023–24
- Emiliano Buendía – Getafe, Cultural Leonesa – 2016–18
- Julio Buffarini – Huesca, FC Cartagena – 2021–22
- Esteban Burgos – Alcorcón, Eibar – 2017–19, 2021–23
- Germán Burgos – Atlético Madrid – 2001–02
- Nahuel Bustos – Girona – 2020–22
- Pablo Nicolás Caballero – Lugo, Almería – 2014–19
- Willy Caballero – Elche – 2005–11
- Mario Cabrera – Castellón – 1978–80, 1988–89
- Fernando Cáceres – Córdoba – 2004–05
- Juan Pablo Caffa – Real Zaragoza, Betis – 2008–11
- Jeremías Caggiano – Albacete – 2007–08
- Pablo Calandria – Leganés, Gijón, Hércules, Albacete – 2002–08
- Esteban Cambiasso – Real Madrid Castilla – 1996–98
- Héctor Canteros – Villarreal – 2012–13
- Tomás Cardona – Las Palmas – 2020–21
- Jorge Carrascal – Sevilla Atlético – 2016–17
- Sebastián Carrera – Real Murcia – 2004–06
- Federico Cartabia – Deportivo La Coruña – 2017–18
- Gastón Casas – Recreativo, Elche, Cádiz, Córdoba – 2005–09
- Gonzalo Castellani – Villarreal B – 2010–12
- Ezequiel Castillo – Espanyol, Rayo Vallecano, Badajoz – 1989–90, 1997–2000
- Gastón del Castillo – Cádiz – 2016–17
- Nicolás Castro – Elche – 2023–25
- Raúl Castronovo – CD Málaga – 1975–76
- Pablo Cavallero – Levante – 2005–06
- Fernando Cavenaghi – Villarreal – 2012–13
- Gastón Cellerino – Celta Vigo – 2009–10
- Francisco Cerro – Rayo Vallecano – 2017–18
- Nereo Champagne – Real Oviedo – 2018–20
- Pablo Chavarría – Málaga – 2020–23
- Leandro Chichizola – Cartagena – 2020–21
- Julián Chicco – Leganés – 2023–24
- Juan Manuel Cobo – Elche – 2007–09
- Santiago Colombatto – Real Oviedo – 2023–25
- Diego Colotto – Deportivo La Coruña – 2011–12
- Fernando Coniglio – Tenerife – 2018–19
- Facundo Coria – Villarreal B – 2010–11
- Tino Costa – Almería – 2017–18
- Franco Cristaldo – Elche, Rayo Vallecano – 2015–17
- Braian Cufré – Mallorca, Málaga – 2020–22
- Jorge D'Alessandro – Salamanca – 1981–82
- Siro Darino – Getafe, Las Palmas – 2000–01, 2006–10
- Pablo De Blasis – Cartagena – 2020–23
- Pablo De Muner – Polideportivo Ejido – 2007–08
- Hermes Desio – Salamanca, Deportivo Alavés – 1996–98
- Christian Díaz – Levante, Ciudad Murcia, Almería – 2002–05
- Cristian Díaz – Atlético B, Málaga, Elche, Salamanca, Gijón, Ciudad Murcia, Granada 74 – 1997–2008
- Daniel "Cata" Díaz – Getafe – 2016–17
- Matías Dituro – Elche – 2023–25
- **Jerónimo Dómina** – **Cádiz** – 2025–
- Alejandro Domínguez – Rayo Vallecano – 2017–18
- Federico Domínguez – Leganés – 2003–04
- Sebastián Dubarbier – Tenerife, Córdoba, Almería – 2010–13, 2015–17
- Sergio Egea – Elche – 1980–81
- Gonzalo Escalante – Cádiz – 2024–25
- Gonzalo Escobar – Ibiza – 2021–23
- Juan Esnáider – Real Madrid Castilla – 1991–93
- Fabián Espíndola – Albacete – 2017–18
- Cristian Espinoza – Real Valladolid – 2016–17
- Alejandro Faurlín – Getafe, Mallorca – 2016–17, 2018–19
- Federico Fazio – Sevilla Atlético – 2006–08
- Augusto Fernández – Cádiz – 2019–20
- Nicolás Fernández – Elche – 2023–25
- Turu Flores – Las Palmas, Ciudad Murcia – 1996–98, 2003–04
- Juan Forlín – Real Oviedo – 2017–19
- Leo Franco – Huesca – 2015–16
- Franchu – Fuenlabrada, Eibar – 2020–23
- Martín Fúriga – Levante – 2001–02
- Francisco Fydriszewski – Lugo – 2017–18
- Adolfo Gaich – Huesca – 2021–22
- Luciano Galletti – Real Zaragoza – 2002–03
- Cristian García – Real Murcia, Tenerife – 2011–13, 2014–15
- Mateo García – Osasuna, Alcorcón – 2017–18
- Amadeo Gasparini – Málaga – 1980–82
- Juan Carlos Gauto – Deportivo La Coruña – 2024–25
- Gianfranco Gazzaniga – Ponferradina – 2019–21
- **Paulo Gazzaniga** – Rayo Vallecano, **Girona** – 2016–17, 2026–
- Santiago Gentiletti – Albacete – 2018–19
- Tiago Geralnik – Villarreal CF B – 2022–23
- Darío Alberto Gigena – Rayo Vallecano – 1997–98
- Leandro Gioda – Xerez – 2010–11
- Ignacio Carlos González – Las Palmas – 1998–99, 2006–08
- Silvio González – Córdoba – 2003–05
- Nicolás Gorosito – Getafe, Albacete, Alcorcón – 2016–22
- Patricio Graff – Gijón, Rayo Vallecano, Numancia, Hércules – 2000–01, 2003–04, 2005–08
- Fausto Grillo – Ibiza – 2022–23
- Carmelo Giuliano – Hércules – 1982–83
- Gonzalo – Málaga – 2019–20
- Pablo Guede – Málaga, Elche, Polideportivo Ejido – 1998–2002
- Diego Herner – Las Palmas – 2011–12
- Guillermo Hoyos – Real Madrid Castilla – 1981–82
- José Raúl Iglesias – Recreativo – 1977–78
- Emanuel Insúa – Racing Ferrol – 2024–25
- Carlos Izquierdoz – Gijón – 2022–24
- Diego Klimowicz – Rayo Vallecano – 1997–98
- Mariano Konyk – Sevilla Atlético – 2017–18
- César La Paglia – Tenerife – 2003–06
- Matías Lequi – Celta Vigo – 2007–08
- **Santiago Lencina** – **Burgos** – 2026–
- Raúl Longhi – San Andrés – 1973–76
- Gustavo López – Celta Vigo, Cádiz – 2004–05, 2007–08
- Lisandro López – Burgos – 2024–25
- Víctor López – Real Sociedad – 2007–08
- Carlos Luna – Elche – 2007–08
- Ezequiel Luna – Tenerife – 2008–09, 2010–11
- Carlos Luque – Alcorcón – 2016–17
- Federico Lussenhoff – Tenerife – 1999–2001
- Germán Lux – Deportivo La Coruña – 2011–12, 2013–14
- Sergio Maciel – Toledo – 1997–98
- Edgardo Madinabeytia – Real Murcia – 1968–69
- Martín Mantovani – Leganés, Las Palmas – 2014–16, 2018–20
- Nicolás Martínez – Real Murcia – 2012–13
- Tomás Martínez – Tenerife – 2015–16
- Diego Mateo – Racing Santander, Real Valladolid – 2001–02, 2004–05
- Marcos Mauro – Cádiz – 2017–20
- Javier Mazzoni – Racing Santander, Polideportivo Ejido – 2001–03
- Óscar Mena – Atlético Madrid, Racing Santander, Las Palmas – 2000–02, 2003–04
- Sebastián Méndez – Celta Vigo – 2004–05
- Felipe Mesones – Real Murcia, Levante – 1958–63
- Ramón Miérez – Tenerife – 2019–20
- Ariel Montenegro – Córdoba, Numancia, Hércules – 2000–08
- Hugo Morales – Tenerife – 1999–2001, 2002–03
- Mateo Musacchio – Villarreal B, Villarreal – 2009–10, 2012–13
- Damián Musto – Cartagena – 2022–25
- Roberto Nanni – Almería – 2004–05
- Cristian Nasuti – Lorca – 2017–18
- Mauro Navas – Leganés – 2003–04
- Fabián Noguera – Gimnàstic, Ponferradina – 2018–20
- Juan Carlos Olave – Real Murcia – 2004–06
- Esteban Orfano – Villarreal B – 2011–12
- **Thiago Ojeda** – Villarreal B, **Cultural Leonesa** – 2022–23, 2025–
- Luis Oruezábal – Granada, Real Jaén – 1976–79
- Germán Pacheco – Rayo Vallecano, Córdoba – 2009–10, 2013–14
- Gino Padula – Elche – 1998–99
- Mario Paglialunga – Hércules, Real Zaragoza, Ponferradina – 2012–15
- Nacho Pais – Cartagena – 2022–23
- Joaquín Panichelli – Deportivo Alavés, Mirandés – 2022–23, 2024–25
- **Agustín Pastoriza** – **Cultural Leonesa** – 2025–
- Mariano Pavone – Betis – 2009–10
- Matías Pavoni – Cádiz – 2003–05, 2006–07
- Pablo Paz – Tenerife – 1999–2001
- Hernán Pellerano – Almería – 2012–13
- Gabriel Peñalba – Las Palmas – 2018–19
- Daniel Pendín – Burgos, Xerez, Castellón – 2001–10
- Guillermo Pereyra – Real Murcia – 2009–10
- Damián Pérez – Gijón – 2019–20
- Diego Perotti – Sevilla Atlético – 2007–09
- Damián Petcoff – Córdoba, Real Jaén – 2012–14
- Matías Pezzolesi – Tenerife – 2024–25
- **Mauro Pittón** – **Tenerife** – 2026–
- Leonardo Ponzio – Real Zaragoza – 2008–09
- Martín Posse – Tenerife – 2003–04
- Abel Morán Puente – Real Valladolid, Atlético Baleares, Granada – 1958–59, 1961–64
- Diego Quintana – Real Murcia – 2001–03
- Mauro Quiroga – Las Palmas, Lugo, Deportivo Alavés – 2010–14
- Juan Ramírez – Almería – 2015–16
- Juan Pablo Raponi – Ponferradina, Racing de Ferrol – 2006–08
- **Nico Ratti** – Llagostera, **Andorra** – 2015–16, 2022–24, 2025–
- Gustavo Reggi – Las Palmas, Levante, Castellón – 2002–04, 2005–06, 2007–08
- Ezequiel Rescaldani – Huesca – 2017–18
- Germán Rivarola – Gijón – 2000–01
- Carlos Roa – Albacete – 2002–03
- **Lucas Robertone** – **Almería** – 2020–22, 2024–
- **Adrián Rodríguez** – **Real Zaragoza** – 2025–
- Pablo Rodríguez – Leganés – 2003–04
- Esteban Rolón – Málaga – 2019–21
- Maxi Rolón – Barcelona B – 2014–15
- Luka Romero – Mallorca – 2020–21
- Miguel Ángel Sebastián Romero – Eibar – 2003–04
- Sebastián Ariel Romero – Betis, Córdoba – 2000–02
- Ariel Rosada – Celta Vigo – 2008–09
- Marco Ruben – Villarreal B – 2009–10
- Franco Russo – Mallorca, Ponferradina – 2018–21
- Sebastián Saja – Rayo Vallecano, Córdoba, Gimnàstic, Real Zaragoza – 2003–05, 2016–17
- Andrés San Martín – Tenerife – 2006–07
- Mauro dos Santos – Real Murcia, Tenerife – 2012–14, 2018–20
- **Alejo Sarco** – **Gijón** – 2026–
- Brian Sarmiento – Xerez, Girona, Salamanca – 2008–11
- Darío Sarmiento – Girona – 2021–22
- Gustavo Savoia – Córdoba – 2009–10
- **Ignacio Schor** – **Ceuta** – 2025–
- Gabriel Schürrer – Málaga – 2006–07
- Leonardo Sequeira – Real Oviedo – 2022–23
- **Agustín Sienra** – **Castellón** – 2025–
- Jonathan Silva – Leganés – 2020–22
- Giuliano Simeone – Real Zaragoza – 2022–23
- Gustavo Siviero – Albacete – 2002–03
- Franco Soldano – Fuenlabrada – 2021–22
- **Lautaro Spatz** – **Andorra** – 2026–
- Leonardo Suárez – Mallorca – 2018–19
- Alexander Szymanowski – Recreativo, Leganés – 2003–04
- José Carlos Tabares – Castellón – 2005–10
- Nicolás Tagliafico – Real Murcia – 2012–13
- Nahuel Tenaglia – Deportivo Alavés – 2022–23
- Mariano Toedtli – Salamanca, Recreativo, Polideportivo Ejido, Cádiz – 2000–01, 2003–08, 2009–10
- Diego Tonetto – Lugo – 2012–13
- Lucas Trecarichi – Sevilla Atlético, Ponferradina – 2017–19
- Óscar Trejo – Elche, Rayo Vallecano, Gijón – 2009–11, 2012–13, 2017–18, 2019–21
- Diego Trotta – Las Palmas, Deportivo Alavés, Elche, Albacete – 2002–04, 2005–09
- Valentín Vada – Almería, Tenerife, Real Zaragoza – 2019–23
- Nahuel Valentini – Real Oviedo – 2017–18
- Federico Varela – Rayo Majadahonda, Las Palmas – 2018–20
- Matías Vargas – Espanyol – 2020–21
- Federico Vega – Alcorcón, Lorca – 2015–18
- Lucho Vega – Alcorcón – 2021–22
- Bruno Zuculini – Rayo Vallecano – 2016–17

== Armenia ==
- **Grant-Leon Ranos** – **Tenerife** – 2026–
- **Edgar Sevikyan** – **Ceuta** – 2026–

== Australia ==
- John Aloisi – Deportivo Alavés – 2006–07
- David Carney – Alcorcón – 2011–12
- Ryan Edwards – Amorebieta – 2023–24
- Denis Genreau – Deportivo La Coruña – 2024–25
- **Awer Mabil** – **Castellón** – 2024–

== Austria ==
- David Affengruber – Elche – 2024–25

== Azerbaijan ==
- Eddy – Real Murcia, Córdoba, Cádiz, Gimnàstic, Alcorcón, Albacete – 2012–14, 2015–21
- Vali Gasimov – Betis, Écija – 1992–94, 1996–97

== Barbados ==
- Nick Blackman – Gijón – 2018–19

== Belarus ==
- Ihar Hurynovich – Castellón – 1993–94

== Belgium ==
- Landry Dimata – Espanyol – 2020–21
- Ronny Gaspercic – CF Extremadura, Deportivo Alavés – 1999–2001, 2003–04
- Andy Kawaya – Cartagena, Albacete – 2021–23
- Ritchie Kitoko – Albacete, Granada, Tenerife, Girona, Real Jaén, UCAM Murcia, Racing Santander – 2007–09, 2010–11, 2012–14, 2016–17, 2019–20
- Erwin Lemmens – Racing Santander – 2001–02
- Jordan Lukaku – Ponferradina – 2022–23
- **Romain Matthys** – **Castellón** – 2025–
- Charly Musonda – Levante – 2022–23
- Aristote Nkaka – Almería, Racing Santander – 2019–20
- Lucas Noubi – Deportivo La Coruña – 2025–26
- **Benjamin Pauwels** – **Leganés** – 2025–
- Largie Ramazani – Almería – 2020–22

== Bolivia ==
- Jaume Cuéllar – Lugo – 2021–23
- Leonardo Fernández – CF Extremadura – 2000–01
- Samuel Galindo – Salamanca, Gimnàstic, Lugo – 2010–13
- Juan Manuel Peña – Celta Vigo – 2007–09
- Jairo Quinteros – Real Zaragoza – 2022–23
- **Marcelo Timorán** – **Córdoba** – 2025–

== Bosnia and Herzegovina ==
- **Samed Bazdar** – **Real Zaragoza** – 2024–
- Ermedin Demirović – Almería – 2018–19
- Dario Đumić – Eldense – 2023–25
- Mirza Golubica – Xerez – 1990–91
- Vladimir Gudelj – Celta Vigo, Compostela – 1991–92, 1999–2001
- Eldin Hadžić – Hércules, Real Zaragoza, Elche – 2012–17
- Anel Karabeg – Real Burgos, Eibar – 1989–91
- Kenan Kodro – Osasuna – 2014–16
- **Anes Krdžalić** – **Tenerife** – 2026–
- Simo Krunić – Marbella – 1994–96
- Bojan Letić – Mirandés – 2020–22
- Jovo Mišeljić – Badajoz – 1994–95
- Borče Sredojević – Deportivo La Coruña – 1989–90
- Miroslav Stevanović – Deportivo Alavés – 2013–14
- Rade Tošić – CP Mérida, Castellón – 1992–94

== Brazil ==
- Matheus Aiás – Mirandés, Real Oviedo, Racing – 2019–20, 2021–24
- Álvaro – Las Palmas – 2002–03
- Reinaldo Alagoano – Huesca – 2009–10
- Alemão – Real Oviedo – 2023–25
- Alexandre – Villarreal, Lorca Deportiva – 1994–98, 2005–07
- Amaral – Las Palmas – 2008–09
- Lucas Anacker – Alcorcón – 2023–24
- Anderson – Fuenlabrada – 2021–22
- Vinícius Araújo – Huesca, Real Zaragoza – 2016–18
- Arthuro – Gijón, Deportivo Alavés, Córdoba – 2004–05, 2006–08
- **Douglas Aurélio** – **Castellón** – 2024–
- Victor Aznar – Cádiz – 2024–26
- Baiano – Rayo Vallecano – 2017–18
- Baltazar – Celta Vigo – 1986–87
- **Léo Baptistão** – **Almería** – 2024–
- Flavio Barros – Racing de Ferrol – 2004–05
- **Arthur Bonaldo** – **Sabadell** – 2026–
- Pedro Botelho – Salamanca, Celta Vigo, Cartagena – 2007–11
- Gabriel Brazão – Albacete, Real Oviedo – 2019–21
- William de Camargo – Cartagena – 2020–21
- Canário – Mallorca – 1968–69
- Thiago Carleto – Elche – 2009–10
- Casemiro – Real Madrid Castilla – 2012–13
- Charles – Pontevedra, Córdoba, Almería – 2004–05, 2010–13
- Cléber – Cartagena – 2011–12
- Yan Couto – Girona – 2020–21
- Denílson – Betis – 2000–01
- Dinei – Celta Vigo – 2008–09
- Tiago Dutra – Villarreal B – 2010–12
- Rodrigo Ely – Almería – 2021–22
- Emerson – Tenerife – 1998–99
- Esquerdinha – Huesca, Hércules, Eibar – 2009–14
- Evando – Villarreal – 1996–97
- Fabão – Betis, Córdoba – 2000–02
- Fabiano – Celta, Compostela – 1990–94, 1998–2001, 2002–03
- Fabinho – Real Madrid Castilla – 2012–13
- **Fabricio (Fabricio Assis de Souza Barbosa)** – **Tenerife** – 2026–
- Fabrício (Fabrício do Rosário dos Santos) – Levante – 2023–25
- Felipe Manoel – Huesca, Levante, Villarreal B – 2008–10
- Filipe Luís – Real Madrid Castilla – 2005–06
- Daniel Fuzato – Ibiza – 2022–23
- Gabriel (Appelt Pires) – Leganés – 2015–16
- Gabriel (Fernando Atz) – Gimnàstic – 2009–10
- Gaúcho – Ourense – 1998–99
- Pedro Geromel – Mallorca – 2013–14
- Everton Giovanella – Salamanca, Celta Vigo – 1996–97, 2004–05
- Giva – Llagostera – 2015–16
- Marcinho Guerreiro – Real Murcia – 2008–09
- Guilherme – Rayo Vallecano – 1994–95
- Guina – Real Murcia, Tenerife, Elche – 1981–83, 1985–86, 1987–89, 1990–91
- Gustavo Henrique – Valladolid – 2023–24
- Iriney – Betis, Mallorca – 2009–11, 2013–14
- Paulo Jamelli – Real Zaragoza, Almería – 2002–03, 2004–05
- Rafael Jaques – Rayo Vallecano – 1999–2000
- João Paulo (1980) – Tenerife – 2005–06
- João Paulo (1981) – Ciudad Murcia – 2004–05
- Joeano – Salamanca – 2003–04
- John – Valladolid – 2023–24
- Jonathan – Almería, Las Palmas – 2019–21
- Jonathas – Elche – 2019–20
- Kaiky – Albacete – 2023–24
- Kaká – Deportivo La Coruña – 2013–14
- Kenedy – Valladolid – 2023–24
- King – Atlético Madrid B – 1996–98
- Derik Lacerda – Ponferradina – 2022–23
- Laionel – Salamanca – 2009–10
- Lázaro – Almería – 2024–26
- Helton Leite – Deportivo La Coruña – 2024–25
- David Lopes – Córdoba – 2009–10
- George Lucas – Celta Vigo – 2007–09
- Michel Macedo – Almería – 2011–12, 2015–16
- Edu Manga – Logroñés – 1999–2000
- Marcelo – Deportivo Alavés – 1996–97
- Marcos André – Mirandés, Real Valladolid – 2019–20, 2021–22
- Magno Mocelin – Deportivo Alavés – 2003–04
- Magrão – Badajoz – 1998–99
- Rafael Martins – Levante – 2016–17
- **Derick Poloni** – **Eldense** – 2023–
- Mazinho – Elche – 2000–01
- Túlio de Melo – Real Valladolid – 2014–15
- Mosquito – Llagostera – 2015–16
- Murilo – Gijón, Mallorca – 2019–21
- **Naldo** – **Racing Ferrol** – 2024–
- Nenê – Deportivo Alavés – 2004–05
- **Lucas Oliveira** – **Valladolid** – 2023–
- Ricardo Oliveira – Real Zaragoza – 2008–09
- Pablo (de Barros Paulino) – Gimnàstic – 2009–10
- Pablo (Filipe Teixeira) – Real Madrid Castilla – 2013–14
- Paulinho – Córdoba – 2012–13
- Marcelinho Paulista – Almería – 2003–04
- Wellington Paulista – Deportivo Alavés – 2006–07
- Paulo Vitor – Albacete – 2018–19
- Matheus Pereira – Eibar – 2022–25
- Bruno Perone – Xerez, Gimnàstic, Real Zaragoza, Extremadura UD – 2010–11, 2016–19
- Julio César Pinheiro – Logroñés – 1997–98
- Bruno Pirri – Lugo – 2022–23
- Derick Poloni – Eldense – 2023–24
- César Prates – Real Madrid Castilla – 1996–97
- Raí – Real Zaragoza – 2016–17, 2018–19
- Rafinha – Barcelona B – 2010–13
- Ramon – Espanyol – 2023–24
- Raudnei – Castellón – 1992–93
- Reinier – Granada – 2024–25
- Renaldo – Las Palmas, Lleida, CF Extremadura – 1998–2002
- Renan – Celta Vigo – 2008–09
- **Lucas Ribeiro** – **Cultural Leonesa** – 2025–
- Ivan Rocha – Real Valladolid, Atlético Madrid B, Elche – 1992–93, 1997–98, 2000–01
- **Ronaldo** – **Castellón** – 2025–
- Lucas Rosa – Valladolid – 2023–24
- Adriano Rossato – Málaga, Salamanca – 2007–08, 2009–10
- Rovérsio – Betis – 2010–11
- Saulo – Celta Vigo – 2009–10
- Guilherme Schettine – Almería – 2020–21
- Sidnei – Las Palmas – 2022–23
- Rodrigo Silva – Huesca – 2009–10
- Wellington Silva – Alcoyano, Ponferradina, Real Murcia – 2011–14
- Roberto Sousa – Salamanca, Celta Vigo, Racing Ferrol – 2006–08
- Adriano Teixeira – Salamanca – 1999–2001, 2002–03
- **Thalys** – **Almería** – 2025–
- Vitinho – Barcelona B – 2017–18
- Wesley (Wesley Lopes da Silva) – Deportivo Alavés – 2006–07
- Wesley (Wesley Moraes Ferreira da Silva) – Levante – 2022–23
- Xandão – Gijón – 2017–18
- Yuri – Las Palmas, Ponferradina – 2007–08, 2010–11, 2012–16, 2019–23
- Zé Carlos – Ibiza – 2022–23
- Zé Ricardo – Lugo – 2022–23

== Bulgaria ==
- Plamen Andreev – Racing Santander – 2025–26
- Spas Delev – Las Palmas – 2013–14
- Iliyan Kiryakov – Mérida – 1993–94
- Petar Mihtarski – Mallorca – 1995–96
- Vladimir Stoyanov – Deportivo La Coruña – 1989–90

== Burkina Faso ==
- **Aboubacar Bassinga** – Mirandés, Ceuta – 2024–
- Yacouba Coulibaly – Cartagena – 2020–21
- Blati Touré – Córdoba – 2018–19

== Cameroon ==
- Thimothée Atouba – Las Palmas – 2012–14
- Macky Bagnack – Barcelona B, Real Zaragoza – 2012–15, 2016–17
- Franck-Yves Bambock – Huesca, Córdoba – 2015–17, 2018–19
- Víctor de Baunbag – Mallorca – 2018–19
- Flavien Enzo Boyomo – Albacete, Real Valladolid – 2020–21, 2022–24
- Iván Cédric – Valladolid – 2023–24
- Mohammed Djetei – Gimnàstic – 2016–19
- Jean Marie Dongou – Barcelona B, Real Zaragoza, Gimnàstic, Lugo – 2011–19
- Achille Emana – Betis, Gimnàstic – 2009–11, 2015–17
- Stephane Emaná – Xerez, Gimnàstic – 2012–13, 2015–18
- Yan Brice Eteki – Sevilla Atlético, Almería – 2017–19
- David Eto'o – Ciudad Murcia – 2004–05
- **Etienne Eto'o** – Mirandés – 2025–
- Samuel Eto'o – Leganés – 1997–98
- Karl Etta Eyong – Cádiz, Villarreal CF B – 2024–25
- **Franck Fomeyem** – **Córdoba** – 2025–
- **Martin Hongla** – Barcelona B, **Granada** – 2017–18, 2024–
- Jean Jules – Albacete – 2018–19
- Raymond Kalla – CF Extremadura – 1999–2002
- Wilfrid Kaptoum – Barcelona B, Almería – 2014–15, 2019–20
- Christian Kofane – Albacete – 2024–25
- Daniel Kome – Atlético Madrid B, Levante, Numancia, Ciudad Murcia, Real Valladolid, Tenerife – 1999–2004, 2005–07, 2008–09, 2010–11
- Pierre Kunde – Granada – 2017–18
- Serge Leuko – Lugo – 2016–20
- Raoul Loé – Osasuna – 2014–15
- Cyrille Makanaky – Málaga, Villarreal – 1990–93
- Stéphane Mbia – Fuenlabrada – 2021–22
- Albert Meyong – Albacete – 2007–08
- **Germain Milla** – **Celta** – 2026–
- **Dominique Moubeke** – **Granada** – 2025–
- Serge N'Gal – Gimnàstic – 2008–10
- Thomas N'Kono – Espanyol, Sabadell – 1989–90, 1991–93
- Dani Ndi – Gijón – 2014–15
- Yvan Neyou – Leganés – 2022–24
- Aloys Nong – Recreativo – 2013–14
- Bil Nsongo – Deportivo La Coruña – 2025–26
- Allan Nyom – Granada, Leganés – 2010–11, 2021–24
- Franck Omgba – Real Oviedo – 2015–16
- Lucien Owona – Alcorcón, Almería – 2016–20
- **Patrick Soko** – Huesca, Almería, **Leganés** – 2022–23, 2024–
- Franck Songo'o – Real Zaragoza, Real Sociedad, Albacete – 2008–11
- Yann Songo'o – Sabadell – 2011–12

== Canada ==
- Diyaeddine Abzi – Leganés – 2023–24
- **Theo Corbeanu** – **Granada** – 2024–
- Iain Hume – Ponferradina – 2015–16
- **Justin Smith** – **Gijón** – 2025–
- Ballou Tabla – Barcelona B, Albacete – 2017–19

== Cape Verde ==
- Bebé – Rayo Vallecano, Real Zaragoza, Racing de Ferrol – 2017–18, 2019–21, 2022–23, 2024–25
- Duk – Leganés – 2025–26
- Sandro Mendes – Hércules, Salamanca – 1997–2000
- David Silva – Castellón – 2009–10
- Heriberto Tavares – Ponferradina – 2022–23
- Bruno Varela – Real Valladolid – 2015–16

== Central African Republic ==
- Wilfried Zahibo – Gimnàstic – 2016–18

== Chile ==
- **Tomás Alarcón** – Real Zaragoza, Cartagena, **Cádiz** – 2022–
- Williams Alarcón – Ibiza – 2022
- Jorge Arias – Levante 1976–77
- Francisco Arrué – Leganés – 2003–04
- Claudio Bravo – Real Sociedad – 2008–10
- Matías Campos Toro – Hércules – 2013–14
- Fernando Carvallo – Cádiz – 1973–77
- Carlos Caszely – Levante – 1973–74
- Juan Catafau – Getafe Deportivo – 1977–78
- **Willy Chatiliez** – **Huesca** – 2024–
- Gonzalo Collao – Extremadura – 2019–20
- Jorge Contreras – Las Palmas – 1983–85, 1988—89
- Pablo Contreras – Celta Vigo – 2004–05, 2007–08
- César Cortés – Albacete – 2006–07
- Nicolás Crovetto – Albacete – 2009
- Juan Delgado – Gimnàstic – 2016–18
- Lucas Domínguez – Ponferradina – 2014–15
- Rogelio Farías – Cádiz – 1974–76
- **Pablo Galdames** – **Burgos** – 2025–
- Felipe Gallegos – Recreativo – 2013–14
- Gabriel Galleguillos – Salamanca, Castellón – 1973–74, 1977–78
- Ángelo Henríquez – Real Zaragoza – 2013–14
- Mauricio Illesca – Las Palmas – 1997
- Manuel Iturra – Real Murcia – 2011–12
- **Ignacio Jeraldino** – **Sporting Gijón** – 2022–
- Igor Lichnovsky – Real Valladolid – 2016–17
- Frank Lobos – Racing Ferrol – 2001–02
- Nicolás Medina – Eibar, Huesca, Castellón – 2007–10
- Óscar Meneses – Real Oviedo – 1985
- Constantino Mohor – Calvo Sotelo, Hospitalet – 1964–66
- Guillermo Muñoz – Deportivo La Coruña – 1973–78
- Jorge Muñoz – Mallorca – 1985–86
- Eduardo Nazar – Logroñés – 1985
- Manuel Neira – Las Palmas – 1998–99
- Nicolás Núñez – Albacete – 2006
- Fabian Orellana – Granada, Celta Vigo – 2010–12
- Higinio Ortúzar – Real Valladolid, Real Sociedad – 1947–49
- Raúl Palacios – Racing Ferrol – 2001
- Jean Paul Pineda – Córdoba – 2015–16
- Francisco Prieto – Mirandés, Ponferradina – 2013–15
- Bryan Rabello – Deportivo La Coruña, Leganés – 2013–15
- Jaime Ramírez – Hospitalet – 1964–66
- Lorenzo Reyes – Betis, Almería – 2014–16
- **Thomas Rodríguez** – **Burgos** – 2024–
- Diego Rubio – Real Valladolid – 2015–16
- Hugo Rubio – Málaga – 1985–86
- Nelson San Martín – Numancia – 2004
- César Santis – Real Murcia – 2001
- Fernando Santís – Las Palmas, Cartagena – 1984–85, 1987–88
- Francisco Silva – Osasuna – 2014
- Luka Tudor – Sabadell – 1992–93
- Juan Pablo Úbeda – Ciudad de Murcia – 2004
- Jorge Valdivia – Rayo Vallecano – 2004
- Gino Valentini – Real Oviedo – 1984
- Fernando Vergara – Rayo Vallecano – 1998–99

== China ==
- Gao Leilei – Extremadura UD – 2019–20
- Wu Lei – Espanyol – 2020–21
- Bernard Sun – Gimnàstic – 2018–19

== Colombia ==
- Leonardo Acevedo – Logroñés – 2020–21
- Abel Aguilar – Xerez, Hércules – 2006–09, 2011–12
- Brayan Angulo – Rayo Vallecano – 2010–11
- Anderson Arroyo – Mirandés, Alavés, Andorra, Burgos – 2021–26
- **Yaser Asprilla** – **Girona** – 2026–
- Juan Camilo Becerra – Ponferradina – 2021–22
- Nicolás Benedetti – Las Palmas – 2025–26
- Edward Bolaños – Ponferradina – 2020–21
- Jorge Carrascal – Sevilla Atlético – 2016–17
- Edwin Congo – Levante, Gijón – 2002–04, 2005–07
- **Óscar Cortés** – **Gijón** – 2025–
- José de la Cuesta – Cádiz, Real Valladolid, Albacete – 2003–05, 2006–11
- Juergen Elitim – Ponferradina, Racing Santander – 2020–21, 2022–23
- Bernardo Espinosa – Sevilla Atlético, Gijón, Girona – 2007–09, 2012–15, 2020–22
- Jonathan Estrada – Real Sociedad – 2009–10
- Gabriel Fuentes – Real Zaragoza – 2022–23
- Lucho García – Ponferradina – 2021–22
- Cucho Hernández – Huesca – 2017–18
- Carlos Daniel Hidalgo – Gijón – 2007–08
- Fredy Hinestroza – Real Zaragoza – 2015–16
- Juancho – Granada – 2018–19
- Jefferson Lerma – Levante – 2016–17
- Neyder Lozano – Elche – 2018–19
- **Daniel Luna** – Mirandés, Cartagena, Huesca – 2023–
- Jeison Medina – Real Zaragoza – 2018–19
- **Mateo Mejía** – **Burgos** – 2025–
- Johan Mojica – Real Valladolid, Rayo Vallecano, Girona – 2014–17, 2019–20
- Didier Moreno – Deportivo La Coruña – 2018–19
- Erik Moreno – Real Valladolid – 2015–16
- Marlos Moreno – Tenerife – 2024–25
- Luis Muriel – Granada – 2010–11
- Jeison Murillo – Las Palmas – 2012–13
- Juanjo Narváez – Real Madrid Castilla, Córdoba, Almería, Las Palmas, Real Zaragoza, Leganés, Cartagena – 2013–14, 2017–24
- Carlos Navarro Montoya – Tenerife – 1999–2000
- **Matías Orozco** – **Castellón** – 2026–
- Juan Sebastián Quintero – Gijón – 2017–18
- Luis Quintero – Amorebieta – 2023–24
- Brayan Perea – Lugo – 2016–17
- Edixon Perea – Las Palmas – 2010–11
- Gustavo Puerta – Racing Santander – 2025–26
- Juan Sebastián Quintero – Gijón – 2017–18
- Adrián Ramos – Granada – 2017–19
- Hámilton Ricard – Numancia – 2005–06
- Joao Rodríguez – Tenerife – 2018–19
- Luis Suárez – Gimnàstic, Real Zaragoza – 2018–20
- Dani Torres – Albacete, Real Zaragoza – 2018–21

== Comoros ==
- Rafidine Abdullah – Cádiz – 2016–18

== (Republic of the Congo) Congo ==
- Thievy Bifouma – Las Palmas – 2012–13
- Dominique Malonga – Real Murcia, Elche – 2013–14, 2016–173
- Pierre Mbemba – Sporting Gijón – 2024–26
- Merveil Ndockyt – Mallorca – 2018–19
- Warren Tchimbembé – Mirandés – 2021–22

== (Democratic Republic of the Congo) Congo DR ==
- Jonathan Bijimine – Córdoba – 2015–17
- Cedrick – Numancia, Betis, UCAM Murcia – 2010–13, 2014–15, 2016–17
- **Brian Cipenga** – **Castellón** – 2024–
- Omenuke Mfulu – Elche, Las Palmas, Deportivo La Coruña – 2019–20, 2021–23, 2024–25

== Costa Rica ==
- Danny Carvajal – Albacete – 2017–18
- Luis Conejo – Albacete – 1990–91
- Jonathan Moya – Huesca – 2015–16
- Keylor Navas – Albacete – 2010–11
- **Patrick Sequeira** – **Lugo** – 2022–

== Croatia ==
- Ivica Barbarić – Real Burgos, Racing Santander, Badajoz, Almería – 1989–90, 1992–96
- **Matía Barzic** – Elche, Eldense, **Cultural Leonesa** 2024–
- Roko Baturina – Racing Santander, Málaga – 2022–25
- Mate Bilić – Almería, Gijón, Córdoba, Lleida – 2002–06, 2007–08, 2012–13
- **Stipe Biuk** – **Valladolid** – 2023–24, 2025–
- Luka Bonačić – CD Málaga – 1980–81
- Milivoj Bračun – Elche – 1987–88
- Ante Budimir – Mallorca – 2018–19, 2020–21
- Dragoslav Čakić – Real Burgos, Xerez, Ourense – 1987–91, 1996–98
- Ante Ćorić – Almería – 2019–20
- Niko Datković – Mirandés – 2021–22
- Toni Datković – Huesca, Cartagena, Albacete – 2019–24
- Ivan Durdov – Mirandés – 2023–24
- Davor Dželalija – Toledo – 1997–98
- Tomislav Erceg – Levante – 1999–2000
- Tomislav Gomelt – Lorca – 2017–18
- Alen Halilović – Barcelona B – 2014–15
- **Dinko Horkaš** – **Las Palmas** – 2025–
- Miloš Hrstić – Deportivo La Coruña – 1985–86
- Tomislav Ivković – Salamanca – 1996–97
- Janko Janković – Hércules – 1995–96
- Robert Jarni – Las Palmas – 1999–2000
- **Roko Jureškin** – **Tenerife** – 2026–
- Predrag Jurić – Real Burgos, Marbella, Mérida – 1989–90, 1992–95
- **Stanko Jurić** – **Valladolid** – 2023–24, 2025–
- Mario Meštrović – Deportivo Alavés – 1996–97
- Nikica Milenković – Real Burgos, Sabadell – 1989–91
- Antonio Milić – Rayo Vallecano – 2019–20
- Mladen Mladenović – Castellón – 1991–93
- Mladen Munjaković – Levante – 1990–91
- Igor Musa – Xerez – 2002–04
- Dubravko Pavličić – Hércules, Salamanca, Racing Ferrol – 1994–96, 1999–2001
- Alen Peternac – Real Murcia, Real Zaragoza – 1981–83
- Draženko Prskalo – CA Marbella – 1992–94
- Davor Radmanović – Hércules – 1987–88
- Boris Rapaić – Las Palmas – 2019–20
- Mauro Ravnić – Lleida – 1992–93
- Elvis Scoria – Lleida – 1997–98
- Mate Šestan – Levante – 1997–98
- Dragan Skočić – Las Palmas, Compostela – 1991–92, 1993–94
- Luka Tudor – Sabadell – 1992–93

== Cuba ==
- **Christian Joel** – **Gijón** – 2018–19, 2020–21, 2023–

== Curaçao ==
- **Daijiro Chirino** – **Castellón** – 2024–
- Jürgen Locadia – Amorebieta – 2023–24

== Cyprus ==
- Ioannis Okkas – Celta Vigo – 2007–08

== Czech Republic ==
- Alois Grussmann – Betis – 1991–92
- Jiří Jarošík – Deportivo Alavés – 2013–15
- Lukáš Juliš – Ibiza – 2022–23
- Roman Kukleta – Betis – 1991–93
- Tomáš Pekhart – Las Palmas – 2018–20
- Jiří Rosický – Atlético Madrid B – 1996–2000
- **Stefan Simić** – **Eibar** – 2023–
- **Tomáš Vaclík** – **Albacete** – 2023–

== Denmark ==
- Nicki Bille Nielsen – Villarreal B, Elche – 2010–12
- Bo Braastrup Andersen – Las Palmas – 2002–03
- Martin Braithwaite – Espanyol – 2023–24
- Riza Durmisi – Leganés, Tenerife – 2022–23
- Andrew Hjulsager – Granada – 2017–18
- **Adam Jakobsen** – **Castellón** – 2025–
- Filip Jörgensen – Villarreal CF B – 2022–23
- Michael Krohn-Dehli – Deportivo La Coruña – 2018–19
- Magnus Troest – Recreativo – 2009–10

== Dominican Republic ==
- Tano Bonnín – Osasuna – 2015–16, 2017–18
- Mariano Díaz – Real Madrid Castilla – 2013–14
- Edipo – Numancia – 2014–15
- **Peter González** – **Valladolid** – 2025–
- Carlos Julio Martínez – Mirandés – 2019–21
- Rafael Núñez – Elche, Cartagena – 2023–25
- Luismi Quezada – Córdoba, Cádiz – 2018–20

== Ecuador ==
- Billy Arce – Extremadura UD – 2018–19
- Jeremy Arévalo – Racing Santander – 2024–26
- **Alfred Caicedo** – **Cádiz** – 2025–
- **Jordy Caicedo** – **Gijón** – 2024–
- Mike Cevallos – Ibiza – 2021–22
- Pervis Estupiñán – Almería, Mallorca – 2017–19
- Erick Ferigra – Las Palmas – 2021–22
- Romario Ibarra – Real Oviedo – 2023–24
- **Anthony Landázuri** – **Tenerife** – 2024–
- Jhegson Méndez – Elche – 2023–24
- Jefferson Montero – Villarreal B – 2009–10
- Gonzalo Plata – Real Valladolid – 2021–22
- Jhafets Reyes – Cartagena – 2024–25
- Gustavo Quezada – Getafe – 2016–17
- Kike Saverio – Ponferradina – 2021–22
- Liberman Torres – Villarreal B – 2022–23
- Joel Valencia – Alcorcón – 2021–22

== Egypt ==
- Haissem Hassan – Mirandés, Villarreal B, Sporting Gijón, Real Oviedo – 2021–25

== El Salvador ==
- Mágico González – Cádiz – 1982–83, 1984–85
- Norberto Huezo – Palencia, Cartagena – 1982–85

== England ==
- Arvin Appiah – Almería, Lugo, CD Tenerife, Málaga CF – 2019–23
- Miguel Azeez – Ibiza – 2022–23
- Louie Donowa – Deportivo La Coruña – 1985–89
- David Hodgson – Xerez – 1987–88
- Charlie I'Anson – Alcorcón, Granada – 2014–15, 2017–18
- Marcus McGuane – Barcelona B – 2017–18
- Charlie Patino – Deportivo La Coruña – 2024–26
- Armando Shashoua – Ibiza – 2022–23
- Samuel Shashoua – Tenerife, Albacete – 2020–24
- **Jude Soonsup-Bell** – **Córdoba** – 2024–
- Teddy Sutherland – Cartagena – 2020–21

== Equatorial Guinea ==
- Carlos Akapo – Numancia, Huesca, Cádiz – 2013–14, 2016–18, 2019–20
- Yago Alonso-Fueyo – Sporting Gijón, Oviedo, Celta Vigo, Cádiz, Levante – 1998–99, 2002–05, 2007–09
- **Luis Asué** – **Leganés** – 2025–
- Álex Balboa – Alavés, Huesca – 2022–23, 2023–24
- Javier Balboa – Real Madrid Castilla, Cartagena, Albacete – 2005–06, 2009–11
- Sergio Barila – Mérida, Levante – 1996–98
- Rubén Belima – Real Madrid Castilla – 2013–14
- Federico Bikoro – Lorca – 2017–18
- Iván Bolado – Elche, Cartagena – 2008–09, 2011–12
- Rodolfo Bodipo – Recreativo, Racing Santander, Alavés, Deportivo La Coruña, Xerez – 1998–2002, 2004–05, 2010–13
- Santi Borikó – Castellón – 2024–25
- Jannick Buyla – Real Zaragoza – 2018–19
- Saúl Coco – Las Palmas – 2020–23
- Juan Cuyami – Recreativo, Burgos – 1998–99, 2001–02
- James Davis – Mallorca – 2015–17
- Dorian Jr. – Leganés – 2022–23
- Juvenal Edjogo Owono – Levante, Alavés, Recreativo, Tenerife, Cartagena, Sabadell – 2001–02, 2004–08, 2011–13
- Juan Epitié – Recreativo, Alavés, Castellón – 2001–02, 2004–07
- Raúl Fabiani – Alcoyano – 2011–12
- Iban Iyanga – Las Palmas – 2008–09, 2010–12
- José Machín – Cartagena – 2024–25
- Omar Mascarell – Real Madrid Castilla – 2012–14
- **Jesús Owono** – Alavés, **Andorra** – 2022–23, 2025–
- Iban Salvador – Valladolid, UCAM Murcia, Cultural Leonesa, Fuenlabrada – 2016–18, 2019–22
- José Luis Senobua – Almería – 1996–97
- Benjamín Zarandona – Betis, Xerez – 2000–01, 2007–08
- Iván Zarandona – Valladolid – 2004–05
- Loren Zúñiga – Málaga – 2020–23

== Eritrea ==
- Henok Goitom – Ciudad Murcia, Almería – 2005–07, 2011–12

== Finland ==
- Robin Lod – Gijón – 2018–19
- Pertti Jantunen – CD Málaga – 1977–78
- Teemu Pukki – Sevilla Atlético – 2008–09
- Berat Sadik – Gimnàstic – 2018–19

== France ==
- Manuel Anatol – Atlético Madrid – 1932–33
- **Kévin Appin** – Ibiza, **Burgos** – 2021–
- John-Christophe Ayina – Real Murcia – 2012–14
- Karim Azamoum – Elche, Albacete – 2018–21
- **Kader Bamba** – **Granada** – 2026–
- Hugo Bargas – Gimnàstic – 2011–12
- Grégory Béranger – Racing Ferrol, Numancia, Las Palmas, Tenerife, Elche – 2005–08, 2009–13
- Jérémy Blasco – Real Sociedad B, Huesca – 2021–25
- **Yann Bodiger** – Córdoba, Cádiz, Castellón, Cartagena, Tenerife, **Ceuta** – 2018–
- Nicolas Bonis – Deportivo Alavés – 2008–09
- Bilal Boutobba – Sevilla Atletico – 2016–18
- Rudy Carlier – Racing Ferrol, Eibar – 2007–09
- **Thomas Carrique** – **Andorra** – 2025–
- Dominique Casagrande – Sevilla – 1997–98
- Johann Charpenet – Racing Ferrol, Elche – 2007–08, 2009–10
- Alexandre Coeff – Mallorca – 2014–15
- Pierre Cornud – Sabadell, Real Oviedo – 2020–22
- Aly Coulibaly – Huesca – 2015–16
- Pascal Cygan – Cartagena – 2009–11
- Ludovic Delporte – Racing Ferrol, Albacete, Gimnàstic – 2001–03, 2010–11
- Didier Digard – Lorca – 2017–18
- Naïs Djouahra – Mirandés, Real Sociedad B, Leganés – 2020–22, 2023–24
- Marc-Olivier Doué – Eldense – 2023–24
- Marc Fachan – Gimnàstic – 2009–10
- Mickaël Gaffoor – Guadalajara, Numancia, Mirandés – 2011–16
- Jimmy Giraudon – Leganés – 2021–22
- Antoine Griezmann – Real Sociedad – 2009–10
- Clément Grenier – Racing de Santander – 2023–24
- Jean-François Hernandez – Rayo Vallecano, Atlético Madrid – 1998–99, 2000–01
- **Justin Kalumba** – **Mallorca** – 2026–
- **Yann Kembo** – **Gijón** – 2025–
- Koba Koindredi – Real Oviedo – 2022–23
- Brahim Konaté – Fuenlabrada – 2021–22
- **Mathis Lachuer** – Mirandés, **Valladolid** – 2023–
- **Théo Le Normand** – **Andorra** – 2025–
- **Alex Lebarbier** – **Real Sociedad B** – 2025–
- Florian Lejeune – Villarreal B, Villarreal, Girona – 2011–13, 2014–16
- Jérémy Lempereur – Alcorcón – 2010–11
- Quentin Lecoeuche – Real Zaragoza – 2023–24
- David Linarès – Tenerife – 2004–05
- **Enzo Loiodice** – **Las Palmas** – 2020–23, 2025–
- Enzo Lombardo – Racing Santander, Huesca – 2019–20, 2021–25
- Jordan Lotiès – Osasuna – 2014–16
- Peter Luccin – Real Zaragoza – 2008–09
- Jean Luciano – Las Palmas – 1952–53
- Pablo Martinez – Deportivo La Coruña – 2024–25
- David Mazzoncini – Las Palmas – 2002–03
- **Jérémy Mellot** – Tenerife, **Castellón** – 2021–
- **Florian Miguel** – Huesca, **Burgos** – 2021–23, 2024–
- **Georges Nsukula** – **Burgos** – 2024–
- **Samuel Ntamack** – **Huesca** – 2025–
- **Noah Obioma** – **Cádiz** – 2026–
- Laurent de Palmas – Racing Ferrol, Almería, Elche – 2004–09
- Noé Pamarot – Hércules – 2009–10, 2013–14
- Franck Passi – Compostela – 1998–99
- Michel Pavon – Betis – 2000–01
- Jérémy Perbet – Villarreal – 2012–13
- Michaël Pereira – Mallorca – 2013–16
- **Lucas Perrin** – **Gijón** – 2025–
- Mathieu Peybernes – Gijón, Lugo, Almería, Real Zaragoza, Málaga – 2018–22
- Stéphane Pignol – Compostela, Almería, Real Murcia, Real Zaragoza, Las Palmas – 1999–2001, 2002–04, 2005–07, 2008–13
- **Julien Ponceau** – **Valladolid** – 2025–
- Gaëtan Poussin – Real Zaragoza – 2023–25
- Jérôme Prior – Cartagena – 2021–22
- Nicolas Sahnoun – Almería – 2004–05
- Matthieu Saunier – Granada – 2017–18
- Aurélien Scheidler – Andorra – 2023–24
- Franck Signorino – Cartagena – 2009–10
- **Aboubaka Soumahoro** – **Mallorca** – 2026–
- Florian Taulemesse – Sabadell – 2011–12
- Philippe Toledo – Elche – 2005–07
- **Noah Ukwuije** – **Cádiz** – 2026–
- Jonathan Varane – Gijón – 2022–24
- Karim Yoda – Getafe, Almería, Reus, Racing Santander – 2016–18, 2019–20
- Enzo Zidane – Rayo Majadahonda, Almería – 2018–20
- **Theo Zidane** – **Córdoba** – 2024–

== Gabon ==
- Lévy Madinda – Gimnàstic – 2015–17

== (The Gambia) Gambia ==
- Bacari – Real Valladolid – 2010–11
- Suleiman Camara – Ibiza, Racing Santander – 2022–23, 2024–26
- Saidy Janko – Real Valladolid – 2021–22
- Aboubakary Kanté – Fuenlabrada, Huesca – 2020–24
- Nuha Marong – Racing Santander – 2019–20
- Sulayman Marreh – Almería – 2017–18

== (Georgia (country)) Georgia ==
- Giorgi Aburjania – Gimnàstic, Sevilla B, Lugo, Real Oviedo, Cartagena – 2015–19, 2020–21
- Luka Gagnidze – Granada – 2025–26
- **Giorgi Gocholeishvili** – **Cádiz** – 2026–
- Giorgi Guliashvili – Racing Santander – 2025–26
- Otar Kakabadze – Gimnàstic – 2016–19
- Giorgi Kochorashvili – Levante – 2023–25
- Giorgi Makaridze – Almería, SD Ponferradina – 2020–23
- Giorgi Papunashvili – Real Zaragoza, Racing Santander – 2017–21
- **Iuri Tabatadze** – **Cádiz** – 2025–
- Giorgi Tsitaishvili – Granada – 2024–25

== Germany ==
- Johannes van den Bergh – Getafe – 2016–17
- Danny Blum – Las Palmas – 2018–19
- Francisco Copado – Mallorca – 1996–97
- Patrick Ebert – Rayo Vallecano – 2016–17
- Josef Elting – Real Murcia – 1975–76
- **Benedikt Gimber** – **Granada** – 2026–
- Marco Haber – Las Palmas – 1998–99
- Tobias Henneböle – Mallorca – 2015–16
- Maikel Hermann – Toledo, Getafe, Compostela, Terrassa, Tenerife, Lorca Deportiva – 1998–99, 2000–01, 2002–07
- Jochen Kientz – Mallorca – 1995–96
- Markus Kreuz – Real Murcia – 2005–06
- Alberto Méndez – Racing Ferrol, Terrassa – 2001–04
- Danny Muller – Barcelona B – 1988–89
- Shkodran Mustafi – Levante – 2022–23
- Gerhard Poschner – Rayo Vallecano, Polideportivo Ejido – 2000–03
- Andreas Reinke – Real Murcia – 2001–03
- Dani Schahin – Extremadura UD – 2018–19
- Timon Wellenreuther – Mallorca – 2015–16

== Ghana ==
- Sabit Abdulai – Extremadura UD – 2019–20
- Kasim Adams – Mallorca – 2014–16
- Emmanuel Addai – Alcorcón – 2023–24
- **Andrews Adjabeng** – **Real Sociedad B** – 2025–
- Michael Agbekpornu – Huesca – 2025–26
- Lumor Agbenyenu – Málaga – 2022–23
- Michael Anaba – Elche – 2015–16
- Emmanuel Attipoe – Extremadura UD – 2018–19
- Tahiru Awudu – Fuenlabrada – 2020–21
- Iddrisu Baba – Mallorca – 2018–19, 2020–21
- Richard Boateng – Real Oviedo, Alcorcón, Cartagena – 2018–22
- Stephen Buer – Fuenlabrada – 2021–22
- Isaac Cofie – Gijón – 2018–19
- Mohammed Dauda – Cartagena, Tenerife, Eldense – 2021–24
- Emmanuel Duah – Mallorca – 1996–97
- Raphael Dwamena – Real Zaragoza – 2019–20
- Mohammed Fatau – Almería – 2015–16
- Emmanuel Lomotey – Extremadura UD – 2019–20
- Jonathan Mensah – Granada – 2010–11
- **Abdul Mumin** – **Girona** – 2026–
- Nana – Recreativo – 2014–15
- Isaac Obeng – Cádiz – 2025–26
- **Samuel Obeng** – Real Oviedo, Huesca, **Ceuta** – 2019–24, 2025–
- David Odonkor – Betis – 2009–11
- Ernest Ohemeng – Mirandés – 2019–20
- **Oscar Naasei Oppong** – **Granada** – 2024–
- Owusu – Real Oviedo – 2017–18
- Sulley Muntari – Albacete – 2018–19
- Thomas Partey – Mallorca, Almería – 2013–15
- Brimah Razak – Guadalajara, Mirandés, Córdoba – 2012–13, 2014–17
- Kwasi Sibo – Amorebieta – 2023–25
- **Bernard Somuah** – **Celta B** – 2026–
- Baba Sule – Mallorca, Ourense, Leganés –1996–2000, 2001–02
- Mubarak Wakaso – Elche – 2008–11
- Yaw Yeboah – Real Oviedo, Numancia – 2017–19

== Greece ==
- Christos Albanis – FC Andorra – 2022–24
- Kostas Chalkias – Real Murcia – 2005–06
- Giannis Gianniotas – Real Valladolid – 2017–18
- Nikolaos Karabelas – Real Valladolid – 2015–16
- **Ilias Kostis** – **Castellón** – 2026–
- Vassilis Lambropoulos – Deportivo La Coruña – 2019–20
- Nikolaos Michelis – Mirandés – 2022–23
- Georgios Samaras – Real Zaragoza – 2016–17
- Nikos Vergos – Elche – 2015–16

== Guadeloupe ==
- Claudio Beauvue – Deportivo La Coruña – 2019–20

== Guatemala ==
- Dwight Pezzarossi – Racing Ferrol, Numancia – 2002–03, 2005–07

== Guinea ==
- Lass Bangoura – Rayo Vallecano, Almería, Lugo – 2010–11, 2016–18, 2019–20
- Thierno Barry – Tenerife – 2021–22
- Salifo Caropitche – Mirandés, Tenerife – 2022–24
- **Seydouba Cissé** – **Leganés** – 2021–24, 2025–
- **Selu Diallo** – **Cultural Leonesa** – 2025–
- **Amadou Diawara** – Eldense, **Leganés** – 2024–
- Sory Kaba – Elche – 2016–17, 2018–19
- José Kanté – Gimnàstic – 2018–19
- Alhassane Keita – Real Valladolid – 2010–11

== Guinea-Bissau ==
- Admonio – Numancia – 2019–20
- Lassana Camará – Real Valladolid – 2011–12
- Salifo Caropitche – Mirandés, Tenerife – 2022–24
- Marcelo Djaló – Lugo, Extremadura UD – 2016–17, 2018–21
- Carlos Embaló – Alcorcón – 2020–21
- Edgar Ié – Barcelona B – 2012–15
- Claudio Mendes – Las Palmas – 2019–22
- Houboulang Mendes – Mirandés – 2023–24
- Formose Mendy – Gijón – 2012–14
- Víctor Rofino – Valladolid – 2023–24
- **Marciano Tchami** – Alcorcón – 2023–24

== Haiti ==
- Frantz Bertin – Tenerife – 2005–06

== Honduras ==
- Bryan Acosta – Tenerife – 2017–19
- Kervin Arriaga – Real Zaragoza – 2024–25
- Jona – Real Jaén, Albacete, UCAM Murcia, Córdoba, Cádiz – 2013–14, 2015–18
- Anthony Lozano – Alcoyano, Tenerife, Barcelona B, Girona, Cádiz – 2011–12, 2015–18, 2019–20

== Hungary ==
- Béla Balogh – Real Murcia – 2008–09
- László Dajka – Las Palmas – 1988–90
- László Éger – Polideportivo Ejido – 2006–07
- Patrik Hidi – Real Oviedo – 2017–18
- Sándor Kiss – Cartagena – 1986–87
- Gábor Korolovszky – CD Toledo – 1999–2000
- Balázs Molnár – Elche – 1999–2000
- Sándor Müller – Hércules – 1982–83
- Andrej Prean Nagy – Las Palmas – 1952–54
- Antal Nagy – Hércules – 1973–74, 1975–76
- Tamás Nikitscher – Real Valladolid – 2025–26
- András Simon – Córdoba – 2009–10
- József Szendrei – Málaga – 1987–88
- Krisztián Vadócz – Deportivo Alavés – 2015–16
- **Antal Yaakobishvili** – Andorra – 2025–

== Iceland ==
- Magnús Bergs – Racing Santander – 1983–84
- Diegui Johannesson – Real Oviedo – 2015–21

== Iran ==
- Amir Abedzadeh – Ponferradina, Castellón – 2021–23, 2024–26
- Karim Ansarifard – Osasuna – 2014–15
- Javad Nekounam – Osasuna – 2014–15
- Masoud Shojaei – Las Palmas – 2013–14

== Israel ==
- **Tay Abed** – **Real Valladolid** – 2026–
- Dudu Aouate – Mallorca – 2013–14
- Gal Arel – Gimnàstic – 2015–16
- Gai Assulin – Hércules, Granada, Mallorca – 2012–15
- Dudu Biton – Alcorcón – 2013–14
- Tomer Hemed – Mallorca, Almería – 2013–15
- Eial Strahman – Córdoba – 2013–14
- Idan Tal – CP Mérida – 1999–2000
- Shon Weissman – Real Valladolid, Granada – 2021–23, 2024–25

== Italy ==
- Lorenzo Amatucci – Las Palmas – 2025–26
- Federico Barba – Gijón – 2017–18
- Giuseppe Baronchelli – Albacete – 1998–99
- Rolando Bianchi – Mallorca – 2015–16
- **Giovanni Bonfanti** – **Las Palmas** – 2026–
- **Federico Bonini** – **Almería** – 2025–
- **Fabrizio Brignani** – **Castellón** – 2025–
- Riccardo Capellini – Mirandés – 2021–22
- Leonardo Capezzi – Albacete – 2019–20
- **Federico Ceccherini** – **Castellón** – 2026–
- Gabriele Corbo – Córdoba – 2024–25
- Lorenzo Crisetig – Mirandés – 2019–20
- Marco Da Graca – Amorebieta – 2023–24
- Tommaso De Nipoti – Castellón – 2025–26
- Nicolao Dumitru – Alcorcón, Gimnàstic – 2017–19
- Diego Fabbrini – Real Oviedo – 2017–18
- **Antonio Gala** – **Castellón** – 2026–
- Salvatore Giunta – Albacete – 1997–98
- Paolo Gozzi – Fuenlabrada – 2021–22
- Pietro Iemmello – Las Palmas – 2020–21
- Antonino La Gumina – Mirandés – 2023–24
- Samuele Longo – Girona, Tenerife, Deportivo La Coruña – 2016–18, 2019–20
- Marco Motta – Almería – 2016–18
- Samuele Mulattieri – Deportivo La Coruña – 2025–26
- Cristiano Piccini – Betis – 2014–15
- Alessandro Pierini – Córdoba – 2004–05
- Federico Piovaccari – Córdoba, Rayo Vallecano – 2016–17, 2018–20
- Giacomo Quagliata – Deportivo La Coruña – 2025–26
- Vincenzo Rennella – Córdoba, Lugo, Betis, Real Valladolid, Extremadura UD, Cádiz – 2012–16, 2018–19
- Antonio Rizzolo – Albacete – 1998–99
- Pocho Román – FC Cartagena – 2024–25
- Antonio Rozzi – Real Madrid Castilla – 2013–14
- **Diego Sia** – **Mirandés** – 2025–
- Eddie Salcedo – Eldense – 2023–24
- Edoardo Soleri – Almería – 2017–18
- Michele Somma – Deportivo La Coruña – 2018–20
- Luca Zanimacchia – Real Zaragoza – 2020–21

== Ivory Coast ==
- **Paul Akouokou** – **Real Zaragoza** – 2025–
- Bobley Anderson – Alcorcón – 2014–15
- Axel Bamba – Gijón – 2022–23
- Djakaria Barro – Cartagena – 2022–24
- Ibrahim Diabate – Mallorca – 2020–21
- Jacques Dago – Fuenlabrada – 2021–22
- Jean Armel Drolé – Las Palmas – 2019–20
- Félix Dja Ettien – Levante – 1997–98, 1999–2004, 2005–06
- Cheick Doukouré – Huesca, Leganés – 2019–20, 2021–22
- Lago Junior – Numancia, Mirandés, Mallorca, Huesca, Málaga, Racing Santander – 2009–10, 2011–13, 2015–17, 2018–19, 2020–25
- Idrissa Keita – Levante, Real Oviedo, Algeciras, Racing Ferrol – 1997–98, 2002–04, 2007–08
- Ghislain Konan – Burgos – 2024–25
- **Kialy Abdoul Kone** – **Ceuta** – 2025–
- Mamadou Koné – Racing Santander, Real Oviedo, Málaga, Deportivo La Coruña – 2012–13, 2014–16, 2018–20
- Jean Luc – Gimnàstic – 2015–18
- Giovanni Sio – Real Sociedad – 2008–09
- Ibrahim Sissoko – Deportivo La Coruña – 2013–14
- Cheick Timité – Fuenlabrada – 2021–22

== Jamaica ==
- Deshorn Brown – Lorca – 2017–18

== Japan ==
- Taichi Hara – Deportivo Alavés – 2022–23
- Ariajasuru Hasegawa – Real Zaragoza – 2015–16
- Kento Hashimoto – Huesca, Eibar – 2022–25
- Hiroshi Ibusuki – Girona – 2008–09
- Yosuke Ideguchi – Cultural Leonesa – 2017–18
- Shinji Kagawa – Real Zaragoza – 2019–20
- **Kazunari Kita** – **Real Sociedad B** – 2025–
- **Taisei Miyashiro** – **Las Palmas** – 2025–
- Shinji Okazaki – Huesca, Cartagena – 2019–20, 2021–22
- Gaku Shibasaki – Tenerife, Deportivo La Coruña, Leganés – 2016–17, 2019–23
- Yukiya Sugita – Hércules – 2013–15
- Daisuke Suzuki – Gimnàstic – 2015–18
- Sotan Tanabe – Sabadell – 2013–15
- Louis Yamaguchi – Extremadura UD – 2019–20

== Kenya ==
- Ismael Athuman – Las Palmas – 2020–21
- **Aldrine Kibet** – **Celta B** – 2026–
- McDonald Mariga – Real Oviedo – 2017–18
- **Job Ochieng** – **Real Sociedad B** – 2025–

== Kosovo ==
- Arijanet Muric – Girona – 2020–21
- Elbasan Rashani – Elche – 2024–25

== Liberia ==
- William Jebor – Ponferradina – 2015–16

== Lithuania ==
- Marius Stankevičius – Córdoba – 2015–16

== Malaysia ==
- Natxo Insa – Eibar, Villarreal B, Celta Vigo, Real Zaragoza, Alcorcón, Levante – 2007–12, 2014–17
- Gabriel Palmero – Tenerife – 2024–25

== Mali ==
- Adama – Gijón – 2012–13
- Mamadou Cellou – Cartagena – 2023–24
- Binke Diabaté – Numancia – 2016–17
- **Moussa Diakité** – **Cádiz** – 2024–
- Moussa Diarra – Málaga – 2022–23
- Issa Fomba – Málaga – 2020–21, 2022–23
- Ibrahima Kébé – Girona, Mirandés – 2019–22, 2023–24
- Sidi Yaya Keita – Xerez – 2012–13
- **Rominigue Kouamé** – **Cádiz** – 2024–
- Aly Mallé – Lorca – 2017–18
- Hadi Sacko – Las Palmas – 2018–19
- Modibo Sagnan – Mirandés – 2019–20
- Moussa Sidibé – Ponferradina – 2020–21
- Abdoul Sissoko – Hércules, Mallorca – 2013–14, 2015–16
- Sumy – Albacete – 2010–11
- **Mamadou Traoré** – **Castellón** – 2024–

== Martinique ==
- Kévin Appin – Ibiza – 2021–23
- Jean-Sylvain Babin – Alcorcón, Gijón – 2010–14, 2018–22, 2023–24
- Samuel Camille – Rayo Vallecano, Córdoba CF, Alcorcón, Ponferradina, Tenerife – 2009–11, 2012–19
- Grégory – Gijón – 2012–13
- Mickaël Malsa – Albacete, Mirandés, Valladolid – 2018–20, 2023–24

== Mauritania ==
- Aly Abeid – Alcorcón – 2018–19
- Dawda Camara – Girona, Cádiz – 2021–22, 2025–27
- Hacen – Lugo – 2019–21, 2022–23
- **Saïd Imigene** – **Leganés** – 2025–
- Abdallahi Mahmoud – Deportivo Alavés – 2022–23
- Idrissa Thiam – Lugo – 2022–23

== Mexico ==
- Daniel Alonso Aceves – Real Oviedo – 2022–23
- Oswaldo Alanís – Real Oviedo – 2018–19
- Javier Aquino – Villarreal – 2012–13
- Jordan Carrillo – Gijón – 2022–24
- Ulises Dávila – Sabadell, Córdoba, Tenerife – 2012–15
- **Álvaro Fidalgo** – **Castellón** – 2025–
- Marcelo Flores – Real Oviedo – 2022–23
- Andrés Guardado – Deportivo La Coruña – 2011–12
- Javier Iturriaga – Salamanca – 2007–08
- Esteban Lozano – Gijón – 2023–24
- César Montes – Almería – 2024–25
- Antonio de Nigris – Polideportivo Ejido – 2003–04
- Jonathan dos Santos – Barcelona B – 2010–12
- Juan Ángel Seguro – Real Unión – 2009–10

== Montenegro ==
- Marko Bakić – Alcorcón – 2016–17
- Dejan Batrović – Getafe, Ourense, Xerez – 1995–98
- Zoran Batrović – Deportivo La Coruña – 1989–90
- Boris Cmiljanić – Huesca – 2016–17
- Andrija Delibašić – Real Sociedad, Hércules, Rayo Vallecano – 2007–11
- Ardian Đokaj – Lleida – 2000–01
- Luka Đorđević – Ponferradina – 2015–16
- Zdravko Drinčić – Osasuna – 1995–96
- Uroš Đurđević – Gijón – 2018–24
- Igor Gluščević – CF Extremadura, Sevilla – 1997–99
- Sead Hakšabanović – Málaga – 2018–19
- Ivan Kecojević – Cádiz, Albacete – 2017–21
- Miodrag Kustudić – Mallorca – 1981–83
- Bogdan Milić – Osasuna – 2015–16
- **Igor Nikić** – **Mirandés** – 2025–
- **Marko Perović** – **Almería** – 2024–
- Vukan Perović – Elche – 1980–81
- Esteban Saveljich – Almería, Levante, Albacete, Rayo Vallecano – 2015–21
- Nikola Šipčić – Tenerife, Cartagena – 2019–25
- Andrija Vukčević – Cartagena – 2024–25

== Morocco ==
- Haitam Abaida – Málaga – 2020–23
- Abdel Abqar – Deportivo Alavés – 2022–23
- Ilias Akhomach – Villarreal CF B – 2023–24
- Abdel Al Badaoui – Alcorcón – 2021–22
- **Selim Amallah** – **Valladolid** – 2023–24, 2025–
- Ayman Arguigue – Huesca – 2023–25
- Nabil Baha – Racing Ferrol, Ponferradina, Málaga, Sabadell – 2005–08, 2011–13
- Abdelaziz Barrada – Gimnàstic – 2018–19
- **Hamza Bellari** – **Castellón** – 2026–
- Zakarya Bergdich – Real Valladolid, Córdoba – 2014–15, 2016–17
- Yassine Bounou "Bono" – Real Zaragoza, Girona – 2014–17
- Badr Boulahroud – Málaga – 2018–21
- Mohamed Bouldini – Fuenlabrada, Levante, Deportivo La Coruña, Granada – 2021–26
- Ouasim Bouy – Cultural Leonesa – 2017–18
- Simo Bouzaidi – Eldense – 2024–25
- Soufiane Chakla – Ponferradina – 2022–23
- Ilyas Chaira – Mirandés, Real Oviedo – 2023–25
- Omar El Hilali – Espanyol – 2020–21
- **Salim El Jebari** – FC Cartagena, **Mirandés** – 2024–
- Jawad El Yamiq – Valladolid, Real Zaragoza – 2019–20, 2021–22, 2025–26
- **Ismael Fadel** – **Castellón** – 2025–
- Rachad Fettal – Almería – 2024–25
- **Adnane Ghailan** – **Córdoba** – 2026–
- Abdeljalil Hadda – Gijón – 1998–2001
- Hicham – Málaga – 2018–22
- Ali Houary – Elche – 2024–25
- Ayoub Jabbari – Racing de Santander – 2022–23
- Jaco – UD España, Rayo Vallecano, Racing de Ferrol – 1953–55, 1958–60
- **Mohamed Jaouab** – **Valladolid** – 2025–
- **Yassine Kechta** – **Leganés** – 2026–
- **Houssam Kounia** – **Almería** – 2025–
- **Youness Lachhab** – Eldense, Ceuta, **Real Oviedo** – 2023–
- Moha (Sanhaji Brahmi) – Numancia – 2019–20
- Moha (Mohamed Ezzarfani) – Mirandés – 2020–21
- Moha (Rharsalla) – Gimnàstic – 2016–17
- Mourad – Elche – 2019–20
- Munir – Numancia, Málaga – 2014–20
- **Aïmen Moueffek** – **Cádiz** – 2026–
- Bilal Ouacharaf – Málaga – 2022–23
- Yacine Qasmi – Elche, Rayo Vallecano, Leganés, Eibar – 2018–24
- Adil Ramzi – Córdoba – 2002–03
- Chadi Riad – Sabadell – 2020–21
- Omar Sadik – Espanyol – 2023–24
- Ousama Siddiki – Logroñés – 2020–21
- Anuar Tuhami – Real Valladolid – 2015–18
- Nabil Touaizi – Albacete – 2024–25
- Zaki – Mallorca – 1988–89
- **Rayan Zinebi** – **Granada** – 2025–

== Mozambique ==
- Bruno Langa – Almería – 2024–25
- Bruno Wilson – Tenerife – 2020–21

== Netherlands ==
- Yassine Abdellaoui – Rayo Vallecano – 1997–98
- Kiran Bechan – Hércules – 2007–08
- **Donny van de Beek** – **Girona** – 2026–
- Thomas van den Belt – Castellón – 2024–25
- Lucas Bijker – Cádiz – 2017–18
- **Zico Buurmeester** – **Leganés** – 2026–
- **Robin van Duiven** – **Valladolid** – 2026–
- Zakaria Eddahchouri – Deportivo La Coruña – 2024–26
- Hector Hevel – Andorra, Cartagena – 2022–24
- Jeffrey Hoogervorst – Gijón, Real Madrid Castilla – 2003–07
- Jens Janse – Córdoba – 2013–14
- Rajiv van La Parra – Logroñés – 2020–21
- Leonel Miguel – Gijón – 2022–23
- Riga Mustapha – Levante, Cartagena – 2005–06, 2010–11
- Junas Naciri – Lugo – 1992–93
- Noah Ohio – Valladolid – 2025–26
- Tarik Oulida – Sevilla – 1997–98
- René Ponk – Compostela – 1998–2000
- Berry Powel – Gimnàstic, Elche – 2010–13
- **Julian Rijkhoff** – **Andorra** – 2026–
- **Kaj de Rooij** – **Valladolid** – 2026–
- Jeffrey Sarpong – Hércules – 2012–13
- Mats Seuntjens – Castellón – 2024–25
- Romano Sion – Compostela – 1998–2001
- **Floris Smand** – **Eldense** – 2026–
- Jozhua Vertrouwd – Castellón – 2024–25
- **Neal Viereck** – **Tenerife** – 2026–
- **Jari Vlak** – **Castellón** – 2026–
- Jetro Willems – Castellón – 2024–25
- Gianni Zuiverloon – Cultural Leonesa – 2017–18

== Niger ==
- Rahim Alhassane – Real Oviedo – 2024–25
- Yacouba Hamani – Ponferradina – 2019–21

== Nigeria ==
- Mutiu Adepoju – Real Madrid Castilla, Racing Santander, Salamanca – 1991–93, 2001–02
- **Willy Agada** – **Real Zaragoza** – 2025–
- Uche Henry Agbo – Deportivo La Coruña – 2019–20
- Wilfred Agbonavbare – Rayo Vallecano, Écija – 1990–92, 1994–95, 1996–97
- **Efe Aghama** – **Cádiz** – 2025–
- Festus Agu – Ourense – 1996–97
- Mikel Agu – Fuenlabrada – 2021–22
- Kabiru Akinsola – Salamanca – 2008–10
- Tunde Akinsola – Valladolid – 2023–24
- **Ibrahim Alani** – **Valladolid** – 2025–
- Emmanuel Amunike – Albacete – 2000–02
- Emmanuel Apeh – Lorca – 2017–18
- Ramon Azeez – Almería, Lugo, Granada, Cartagena – 2012–13, 2015–19, 2020–21
- Haruna Babangida – Barcelona B, Terrassa, Cádiz – 1998–99, 2002–04
- Macauley Chrisantus – Las Palmas, Reus – 2012–14, 2016–17
- Chukwuma Eze – Real Oviedo – 2024–25
- James Igbekeme – Real Zaragoza – 2018–22
- Odion Ighalo – Granada – 2010–11
- Abass Lawal – Atlético Madrid B, Atlético Madrid, Córdoba, Leganés, Xerez – 1997–2003, 2004–05
- **Quadri Liameed** – **Sabadell** – 2026–
- **Kenneth Mamah** – **Castellón** – 2024–
- Kelechi Nwakali – Huesca, Alcorcón, Ponferradina – 2019–23
- Nwankwo Obiora – Córdoba – 2013–14
- Michael Obiku – Mallorca – 1996–97
- Bartholomew Ogbeche – Deportivo Alavés, Cádiz, Xerez – 2006–07, 2009–10, 2012–13
- Sixtus Ogbuehi – Eldense – 2024–25
- Christopher Ohen – Real Madrid Castilla, Compostela, Leganés – 1989–90, 1991–94, 2000–02
- **Chidiebere Okoro** – **Ceuta** – 2026–
- Kenneth Omeruo – Leganés – 2020–23
- Cedric Omoigui – Mallorca – 2014–15, 2016–17
- **Chinaza Onouha** – **Granada** – 2026–
- Valentine Ozornwafor – Almería – 2019–20
- Umar Sadiq – Almería – 2020–22
- Stephen Sunday – Polideportivo Ejido, Betis, Numancia – 2005–07, 2009–13
- Ikechukwu Uche – Racing Ferrol, Recreativo, Villarreal, Gimnàstic – 2001–06, 2012–13, 2016–19
- Kalu Uche – Almería – 2005–07, 2015–17
- Francis Uzoho – Elche – 2018–19

== North Macedonia ==
- Boban Babunski – Lleida, Logroñés – 1994–96, 1999–2000
- David Babunski – Barcelona B – 2013–15
- Stole Dimitrievski – Gimnàstic, Rayo Vallecano – 2016–18, 2019–21
- Aleksandar Trajkovski – Mallorca – 2020–21

== Norway ==
- **Vegard Erlien** – **Valladolid** – 2025–
- André Schei Lindbæk – Numancia, Las Palmas – 2002–04
- Håvard Nordtveit – Salamanca – 2008–09

== Palestine ==
- Daniel Mustafá – Huesca – 2009–10

== Panama ==
- Édgar Bárcenas – Real Oviedo, Girona, Leganés – 2018–22
- Adalberto Carrasquilla – Cartagena – 2020–21
- **Edward Cedeño** – **Las Palmas** – 2025–
- Fidel Escobar – Alcorcón – 2020–22
- Rommel Fernández – Tenerife – 1987–89
- Blas Pérez – Hércules – 2007–08
- Alberto Quintero – Cartagena – 2009–10
- José Luis Rodríguez – Lugo, Sporting Gijón – 2020–22
- César Yanis – Real Zaragoza – 2021–22

== Paraguay ==
- Javier Acuña – Cádiz, Salamanca, Recreativo, Girona, Mallorca, Numancia, Albacete – 2006–08, 2010–13, 2015–20
- Roberto Acuña – Elche – 2003–04
- Angel Amarilla – Getafe, Badajoz – 2000–02
- Saturnino Arrúa – Real Zaragoza – 1977–78
- José Aveiro – Valencia Mestalla, Ontinyent, Constància – 1961–63, 1964–66
- Epifanio Benítez – Elche – 1978–79
- Miguel Ángel Benítez – Mérida, Almería – 1994–95, 2003–04
- Eufemio Cabral – Racing Santander, Hércules, Lorca – 1979–80, 1982–85
- **Hugo Cuenca** – **Celta B** – 2026–
- Sergio Díaz – Lugo – 2017–18
- Juan Escobar – Castellón – 2024–25
- Pedro Fernández – Granada – 1976–78
- Felipe Nery Franco – Elche – 1982–84
- Jonathan David Gómez – Real Murcia – 2012–13
- Carlos González – Lleida – 2000–01
- Julio Irrazábal – Hércules – 2006–07
- Dante López – Córdoba – 2003–04
- Líder Mármol – Hércules – 2006–07
- Hernán Pérez – Villarreal B, Villarreal, Real Valladolid – 2009–11, 2012–13, 2014–15
- Claudio Morel Rodríguez – Deportivo La Coruña – 2011–12
- Jorge Amado Nunes – Elche – 1986–87
- Danilo Ortíz – Elche – 2019–20
- José Parodi – Las Palmas – 1960–61
- Isidro Pitta – Huesca – 2021–22
- Antonio Sanabria – Barcelona B – 2013–14
- Delio Toledo – Real Zaragoza – 2002–03
- Aureliano Torres – Real Murcia – 2005–06
- Carlos Luis Torres – Badajoz, Real Jaén – 1995–2002

== Peru ==
- Luis Advíncula – Rayo Vallecano – 2019–21
- Santiago Acasiete – Almería – 2005–07, 2011–12
- Cristian Benavente – Real Madrid Castilla – 2013–15
- Alexander Callens – Numancia – 2015–17
- Guillermo Delgado – Cádiz – 1963–64
- Aldair Fuentes – Fuenlabrada – 2020–22
- Damián Ísmodes – Eibar – 2008–09
- Jeisson Martínez – Rayo Majadahonda, Fuenlabrada – 2018–20
- Roberto Merino – Málaga B, Ciudad Murcia – 2003–05
- Máximo Mosquera – Atlético Baleares, Cádiz – 1961–63
- Andy Pando – Las Palmas – 2012–13
- Sergio Peña – Granada – 2017–18
- Miguel Rebosio – Real Zaragoza – 2002–03
- Jean-Pierre Rhyner – Cádiz – 2019–20
- Beto da Silva – Deportivo La Coruña – 2019–20

== Philippines ==
- Ángel Guirado – Córdoba, Vecindario – 2004–05, 2006–07
- Javier Patiño – Córdoba, Xerez – 2011–13
- Álvaro Silva – Málaga, Xerez, Cádiz – 2006–10, 2011–13
- **Nick Markanich** – **Castellón** – 2024–
- **Randy Schneider** – **Andorra** – 2026–

== Poland ==
- Mateusz Bogusz – Logroñés, Ibiza – 2020–23
- Paweł Brożek – Recreativo – 2012–13
- Marcin Bułka – Cartagena – 2020–21
- **Adam Buksa** – **Mallorca** – 2026–
- Tomasz Frankowski – Elche, Tenerife – 2005–07
- Roger Guerreiro – Celta Vigo – 2004–05
- Kamil Jóźwiak – Granada – 2024–25
- Paweł Kieszek – Córdoba, Málaga – 2016–19
- Kamil Kosowski – Cádiz – 2007–08
- Wojciech Kowalczyk – Las Palmas – 1997–99
- Antoni Łukasiewicz – Elche – 2006–07
- Grzegorz Mielcarski – Salamanca – 1999–2000
- Piotr Parzyszek – Leganés – 2022–23
- Damien Perquis – Betis – 2014–15
- Jerzy Podbrożny – Mérida, Toledo – 1996–98
- Adrian Sikora – Real Murcia – 2008–09
- Ryszard Staniek – Osasuna – 1994–95
- Mirosław Trzeciak – Osasuna, Polideportivo Ejido – 1998–2000, 2001–02
- Jan Urban – Osasuna, Toledo – 1994–96
- Cezary Wilk – Deportivo La Coruña, Real Zaragoza – 2013–14, 2015–17
- Jacek Ziober – Osasuna – 1994–95

== Portugal ==
- João Afonso – Córdoba – 2017–18
- Nuno Afonso – Salamanca – 1996–97
- Joaquim Agostinho – Real Madrid Castilla, Salamanca, Las Palmas, Málaga, Polideportivo Ejido – 1995–99, 2003–04
- Salvador Agra – Granada, Cádiz – 2017–19
- Marco Almeida – Ciudad Murcia – 2004–05
- Luis Andrade – Tenerife – 2003–04
- Jorge Araújo – Recreativo – 2013–14
- Hélder Baptista – Rayo Vallecano – 2003–04
- Bino – Tenerife – 2002–03
- César Brito – Salamanca, Mérida – 1996–97, 1998–99
- Bruno Tiago – Salamanca, Mérida – 2001–02
- **Leonardo Buta** – **Eibar** – 2025–
- Agostinho Cá – Barcelona B, Girona – 2012–15
- David Caiado – Ponferradina – 2015–16
- Bruno Caires – Tenerife – 1999–2000
- José Calado – Polideportivo Ejido – 2003–07
- Daniel Candeias – Recreativo – 2009–10
- Capucho – Celta Vigo – 2004–05
- Carlitos – Polideportivo Ejido – 2003–04
- Daniel Carriço – Almería – 2021–22
- Nuno Carvalho – Lleida – 2005–06
- Zé Castro – Deportivo La Coruña, Rayo Vallecano – 2011–12, 2016–17
- Fábio Coentrão – Real Zaragoza – 2008–09
- Constantino – Levante – 1999–2000
- João Costa – Mirandés – 2019–20
- Rui Costa – Alcorcón – 2019–20
- Samuel Costa – Almería – 2020–22
- Paulo Costinha – Tenerife – 1999–2000
- Vítor Damas – Racing Santander – 1979–80
- Dani – Atlético Madrid – 2000–02
- Domingos Duarte – Deportivo La Coruña – 2018–19
- Duda – Levante – 2002–03
- Edgar – Málaga, Getafe – 1998–99, 2002–03, 2006–07
- Eliseu – Málaga – 2007–08
- Úmaro Embaló – Cartagena – 2023–24
- Nuno Espírito Santo – CP Mérida – 1998–2000
- Fábio Faria – Real Valladolid – 2010–11
- **Guilherme Fernandes** – **Valladolid** – 2025–
- Ivanildo Fernandes – Almería – 2020–21
- Julien Fernandes – Cartagena – 2010–12
- Vasco Fernandes – Salamanca, Celta Vigo, Elche – 2007–08, 2009–11
- André Ferreira – Granada – 2022–23
- Marco Ferreira – Atlético Madrid B – 1997–98
- Fininho – Málaga B – 2004–05
- João Fonseca – Ourense – 1973–75
- Carlos Freire – Celta – 1986–87
- Bruno Gama – Deportivo La Coruña, Alcorcón – 2011–12, 2013–14, 2017–18
- **Jastin García** – **Andorra** – 2025–
- Miguel Garcia – Mallorca – 2013–14
- André Geraldes – Gijón – 2018–19
- Francisco Geraldes – Eldense – 2024–25
- Tiago Gomes – Hércules – 2009–10, 2011–12
- **Gui Guedes** – Lugo, **Almería** – 2022–23, 2024–
- Raphael Guzzo – Reus – 2016–18
- Hernâni – Las Palmas – 2021–22
- **André Horta** – **Almería** – 2025–
- Igor – Girona, Levante, Tenerife – 2008–11
- Jair – Huesca – 2016–18
- Daniel Kenedy – Albacete – 1998–99
- Hugo Leal – Atlético Madrid, Salamanca – 2000–01, 2009–10
- André Leão – Real Valladolid – 2014–17
- Luís Gustavo Ledes – Barcelona B, Reus, Numancia, Castellón – 2010–13, 2017–21
- **Leonardo Lelo** – **Almería** – 2026–
- Licá – Granada – 2017–18
- Miguel Lopes – Betis – 2010–11
- Luisinho – Deportivo La Coruña, Huesca – 2013–14, 2019–20
- Ariza Makukula – Salamanca, Leganés – 2000–02
- Luís Martins – Osasuna – 2015–16
- Mano – Villarreal B – 2010–12
- Marcos Paulo – Mirandés – 2022–23
- Francisco Mascarenhas – Real Oviedo, Eldense – 2022–25
- Diogo Matos – Las Palmas – 2002–03
- Luís Maximiano – Almería – 2024–25
- Pedro Mendes – Almería – 2020–21
- Florian Miguel – Huesca – 2021–23
- **Nélson Monte** – Málaga, **Almería** – 2024–
- Thierry Moutinho – Albacete, Mallorca, Tenerife, Cultural Leonesa – 2013–18
- Nélson – Betis, Alcorcón – 2009–10, 2015–17
- Aldair Neves – Ponferradina – 2022–23
- José Nunes – Mallorca – 2013–14
- Pauleta – Salamanca – 1996–97
- Paulo Jorge – Málaga – 2007–08
- Paulo Sérgio – Salamanca – 2008–09
- André Pereira – Real Zaragoza – 2019–20
- Tiago Pereira – Rayo Vallecano, Tenerife – 1998–2000
- Vítor Pereira – CF Extremadura – 2000–02
- Nuno Pina – Fuenlabrada – 2021–22
- João Pinto – Atlético Madrileño – 1989–91
- João Manuel Pinto – Real Murcia – 2003–04
- Tiago Pinto – Racing Santander – 2012–13
- Diogo Queirós – Real Valladolid – 2021–22
- **Rodrigo Rêgo** – **Castellón** – 2026–
- Reko – Alcorcón – 2019–21
- **Tomás Ribeiro** – **Cultural Leonesa** – 2025–
- **Dinis Rodrigues** – **Eldense** – 2026–
- Nuno Rodrigues – Badajoz – 2002–03
- Pêpê Rodrigues – Cartagena – 2022–23
- Hélder Rosário – Málaga – 2007–08
- Josué Sá – Huesca – 2019–20
- Orlando Sá – Málaga – 2020–21
- Diogo Salomão – Deportivo La Coruña, Mallorca – 2011–12, 2013–14, 2015–17
- Renato Santos – Málaga – 2018–20
- Ricardo Schutte – Mirandés – 2020–21
- Henrique Sereno – Almería – 2016–17
- Silas – Elche – 1999–2000
- Mário Silva – Recreativo – 2004–05
- Rui Silva – Granada – 2017–19
- Vítor Silva – Reus, Deportivo La Coruña – 2016–19
- André Sousa – Gijón – 2018–19
- Dyego Sousa – Almería – 2021–22
- Alfonso Taira – Córdoba – 2011–12
- José Taira – Salamanca, Sevilla – 1996–97, 1999–2001
- Paulo Teles – Deportivo La Coruña – 2013–14
- Pedro Tiba – Real Valladolid – 2015–16
- Paulo Torres – Salamanca, Rayo Vallecano, Leganés – 1996–97, 1998–2000
- Tulipa – Badajoz – 2000–02
- Ricardo Vaz – Reus – 2016–19
- Frederico Venâncio – Lugo, Eibar – 2020–24
- Diogo Verdasca – Real Zaragoza – 2017–19
- Rúben Vezo – Levante – 2022–24
- Miguel Vieira – Lugo – 2018–19
- Bernardo Vital – Real Zaragoza – 2024–25
- **Vlad** – **Celta B** – 2026–
- Zé Carlos – Ibiza – 2022–23

== Puerto Rico ==
- Leandro Antonetti – Lugo – 2021–23

== Qatar ==
- **Homam Ahmed** – **Cultural Leonesa** – 2025–
- Ahmed Yasser – Cultural Leonesa – 2017–18

== Republic of Ireland ==
- Ian Harte – Levante – 2005–06
- **Aarón Ochoa** – **Málaga** – 2024–

== Romania ==
- Florin Andone – Córdoba, Las Palmas, Eldense – 2015–16, 2022–24
- Ioan Andone – Elche – 1990–91
- Paul Anton – Getafe, Ponferradina – 2016–17, 2021–23
- Lucian Bălan – Real Murcia – 1989–90
- Constantin Barbu – Numancia – 2001–02
- Daniel Baston – Compostela – 1998–99
- Miodrag Belodedici – Villarreal – 1995–96
- Gheorghe Craioveanu – Villarreal, Getafe – 1999–2000, 2002–04
- Ovidiu Cuc – Mérida, Atlético Marbella – 1993–96
- Ionel Dănciulescu – Hércules – 2009–10
- Marin Dună – Logroñés – 1997–98
- Iulian Filipescu – Real Betis – 2000–01
- Constantin Gâlcă – Mallorca, Zaragoza, Almería – 1996–97, 2002–06
- Ionel Gane – Osasuna – 1996–98
- Cristian Ganea – Numancia – 2018–19
- Ricardo Grigore – Eldense – 2024–25
- Sabin Ilie – Lleida – 1998–99
- **Alexandru Ișfan** – **Real Oviedo** – 2026–
- Marius Luca – Getafe – 1999–2000
- Bogdan Mara – Poli Ejido – 2004–05
- Lucian Marinescu – Salamanca – 2000–02
- Dinu Moldovan – Ponferradina – 2013–16
- Cătălin Munteanu – Salamanca, Albacete, Real Murcia – 1999–2001, 2002–03, 2004–05
- **Albert Niculăesei** – **Elche** – 2024–
- Răzvan Ochiroșii – Alcorcón – 2015–17
- Daniel Paraschiv – Real Oviedo – 2024–25
- Alex Pașcanu – Ponferradina, Sporting Gijón – 2020–24
- Razvan Popa – Real Zaragoza – 2016–17
- Răzvan Raț – Rayo Vallecano – 2016–18
- Andrei Rațiu – Huesca – 2021–23
- Laurențiu Roșu – Numancia, Recreativo – 2001–06
- Marcel Sabou – Castilla, Racing Santander – 1989–90, 1991–93
- Dennis Șerban – Villarreal, Elche, Córdoba, Poli Ejido – 1999–2001, 2002–04
- Florian Simion – Figueres – 1990–91
- Bogdan Stelea – Mallorca, Salamanca – 1992–93, 1999–04
- Ovidiu Stîngă – Salamanca – 1996–97
- Gheorghe Viscreanu – Rayo Vallecano – 1990–91

== Russia ==
- Denis Cheryshev – Real Madrid Castilla – 2012–13
- Dmitri Cheryshev – Gijón, Burgos – 1998–2002
- Sergey Dmitriyev – Xerez – 1990–91
- Ilshat Fayzulin – Villarreal, Getafe – 1997–98, 2000–01
- Dmitri Galiamin – Español, Mérida – 1993–95
- Nikita Iosifov – Villarreal CF B, Castellón – 2022–24
- Andrey Kobelev – Betis – 1992–94
- Igor Korneev – Español – 1993–94
- Dmitri Kuznetsov – Español, Lleida, Deportivo Alavés, Osasuna – 1993–97
- Igor Lediakhov – Gijón, Eibar – 1998–2003
- Andrei Mokh – Toledo, Leganés – 1993–96, 1997–98
- Aleksandr Mostovoi – Deportivo Alavés – 2004–05
- **Nikolay Obolskiy** – **Córdoba** – 2024–
- Viktor Onopko – Real Oviedo – 2001–02
- Dmitri Popov – Compostela, Toledo – 1998–2000
- Dmitri Radchenko – Compostela – 1998–99
- Oleg Salenko – Córdoba – 1999–2000
- Anton Shvets – Real Zaragoza – 2013–14
- Igor Simutenkov – Tenerife – 1999–2001

== Scotland ==
- Ikechi Anya – Celta Vigo – 2010–11
- Steve Archibald – Espanyol – 1989–90
- Ryan Harper – Guadalajara – 2011–12
- Jack Harper – Málaga, Alcorcón, Cartagena – 2018–21
- Jim Steel – Deportivo La Coruña – 1986–87

== Senegal ==
- Amath – Tenerife – 2016–17
- Abdoulaye Ba – Rayo Vallecano, Deportivo La Coruña – 2017–18, 2019–20
- Ibrahima Baldé – Numancia, Real Oviedo – 2010–11, 2018–20
- Keita Baldé – Espanyol – 2023–24
- Amadou Boiro – Gimnàstic – 2016–17
- Pathé Ciss – Fuenlabrada – 2019–21
- **Amadou Coundoul** – **Gijón** – 2025–
- **Baïla Diallo** – **Granada** – 2025–
- Pape Diamanka – Leganés, Real Zaragoza, Almería, Numancia, Girona, Albacete – 2014–21
- Mohamed Diamé – Rayo Vallecano – 2008–09
- Famara Diédhiou – Granada – 2022–23
- Papakouli Diop – Gimnàstic – 2008–09
- Mamadou Fall – Villarreal B – 2022–23
- **Souleymane Faye** – **Granada** – 2025–
- Sekou Gassama – Almería, Fuenlabrada, Valladolid, Málaga, Racing Santander – 2018–23
- **Christian Gomis** – **Tenerife** – 2026–
- **Djibril Gueye** – **Leganés** – 2025–
- **Maguette Gueye** – **Racing Santander** – 2024–
- Makhtar Gueye – Real Zaragoza – 2022–23
- Nicolas Jackson – Mirandés – 2020–21
- **Dion Lopy** – **Almería** – 2024–
- **Mamadou Loum** – **Gijón** – 2025–
- **Seyni Mbaye Ndiaye** – **Celta B** – 2026–
- Khalifa Sankaré – Cádiz – 2016–18
- Mamadou Sylla – Racing Santander, Girona, Alavés, Valladolid – 2014–15, 2020–24
- Ousseynou Thioune – Gimnàstic – 2018–19

== Serbia ==
- Ivan Adžić – Toledo – 1997–98
- Miodrag Anđelković – Almería – 1996–97
- Srđan Babić – Reus, Almería – 2016–17, 2021–22
- Branislav Bajić – Xerez – 2003–08
- Rahim Beširović – Lleida – 1996–98
- Dragiša Binić – Levante – 1989–90
- Goran Bogdanović – Mallorca, CF Extremadura – 1993–95, 1997–98
- Miloš Bogunović – Cádiz – 2009–10
- Darko Brašanac – Leganés – 2023–24
- Rajko Brežančić – Huesca – 2016–18
- Nikola Čumić – Gijón – 2020–21
- Ranko Despotović – Real Murcia, Salamanca, Girona, Deportivo Alavés – 2008–11, 2014–15
- Petar Divić – Toledo – 1996–97
- Marko Dmitrović – Alcorcón – 2015–17
- Goran Đorović – Elche – 2003–04
- Dejan Dražić – Real Valladolid – 2016–17
- Goran Drulić – Barcelona B, Real Zaragoza – 1996–97, 2002–03
- Ratomir Dujković – Real Oviedo – 1974–75, 1976–77
- Nenad Đukanović – Hércules – 1998–99
- Miroslav Đukić – Deportivo La Coruña, Tenerife – 1990–91, 2003–04
- Ivan Đurđević – Ourense – 1998–99
- Milan Đurđević – Mallorca – 1994–95
- **Stefan Džodić** – **Almería** – 2025–
- Ranko Golijanin – Hércules – 2007–08
- **Stefan Golubović** – **Andorra** – 2026–
- Nenad Grozdić – Racing Ferrol – 2001–02
- Nebojša Gudelj – Logroñés, Leganés – 1995–97
- Nikola Gulan – Mallorca – 2014–15
- Aleksandar Ilić – Cádiz – 1993–94
- Dragan Isailović – Burgos – 2001–03
- Goran Jezdimirović – Écija – 1996–97
- Miloš Jojić – Castellón – 2024–25
- Slaviša Jokanović – Ciudad Murcia – 2003–04
- Aleksandar Jovanović – Deportivo La Coruña – 2019–20
- Đorđe Jovanović – Cádiz – 2018–19
- Saša Jovanović – Córdoba, Deportivo La Coruña – 2017–20
- Milovan Jović – Elche – 1981–82
- Željko Kalajdžić – Logroñés – 1999–2000
- Andrija Kaluđerović – Racing Santander – 2012–13
- Goran Kopunović – Figueres – 1992–93
- **Bojan Kovačević** – **Cádiz** – 2024–
- Bojan Krkić Sr. – Mollerussa – 1988–89
- Dejan Lekić – Gijón, Girona, Mallorca, Reus, Cádiz – 2013–14, 2015–19
- Dragoje Leković – Málaga – 1998–99
- Stefan Leković – Villarreal CF B – 2023–24
- Leo Lerinc – Ciudad Murcia – 2003–05
- Vladan Lukić – Marbella – 1994–95
- Filip Malbašić – Tenerife, Cádiz, Burgos – 2017–20, 2021–22
- Nikola Maraš – Almería – 2019–21
- Goran Marić – Celta Vigo, Barcelona B, Real Unión – 2007–10
- Zoran Marić – Celta Vigo, Salamanca – 1990–93
- Nebojša Marinković – Gimnàstic – 2008–09
- Dejan Marković – Figueres, Logroñés, Osasuna – 1992–93, 1995–96, 1997–2000
- Filip Marković – Mallorca – 2014–15
- Saša Marković – Córdoba – 2015–18
- Dušan Mijić – Palamós – 1992–93
- Milan Milijaš – Málaga – 1998–99
- Goran Milojević – Mérida, Mallorca, Villarreal – 1991–95, 1996–98
- Goran Milosević – Lleida, Real Jaén – 1997–98, 1999–2002
- **Marko Milovanović** – **Almería** – 2024–
- Uroš Milovanović – Gijón – 2022–23
- Nenad Mirosavljević – Cádiz – 2004–05
- Zdenko Muf – Badajoz – 1996–97
- Albert Nađ – Elche, Real Oviedo – 2000–02
- Zoran Njeguš – Atlético Madrid – 2000–01
- Dejan Osmanović – CF Extremadura – 1998–99
- Aleksandar Pantić – Lugo – 2022–23
- Veljko Paunović – CA Marbella, Atlético Madrid, Tenerife – 1995–96, 2000–01, 2002–03
- Marko Perović – Gijón – 1998–2000
- Dušan Petković – Mallorca, Écija – 1995–96
- Njegoš Petrović – Granada – 2022–23
- Radosav Petrović – Almería, Real Zaragoza – 2019–23
- Ranko Popović – Almería – 1995–97
- Stéphane Porato – Deportivo Alavés, Xerez – 2006–09
- Dragan Punišić – Castellón – 1991–93
- **Aleksa Purić** – **Racing Ferrol** – 2024–
- Uroš Račić – Tenerife – 2018–19
- Nikola Radmanović – CP Mérida– 1996–97
- **Nemanja Radoja** – **Cultural Leonesa** – 2025–
- **Aleksandar Radovanović** – **Almería** – 2024–
- Lazar Ranđelović – Leganés – 2021–22
- Dragan Rosić – Fuenlabrada – 2020–21
- Goran Šaula – Compostela – 1998–2000
- Marko Šćepović – Mallorca, Lugo – 2014–15, 2022–23
- Slađan Šćepović – CP Mérida – 1996–97
- Stefan Šćepović – Gijón, Getafe, Málaga – 2013–14, 2016–18, 2020–21
- Aleksandar Sedlar – Mallorca – 2020–21
- Predrag Spasić – CA Marbella – 1994–95
- Slavoljub Srnić – Las Palmas – 2018–20
- Jovan Stanković – Mallorca, Atlético Madrid, Lleida – 1995–97, 2001–02, 2004–05
- Predrag Stanković – Hércules – 1997–99
- Igor Stefanović – Córdoba – 2017–18
- Zoran Stojadinović – Deportivo de La Coruña, Figueres – 1990–91, 1992–93
- Goran Stojiljković – Getafe, Mallorca, Leganés – 1995–98
- Nikola Stojiljković – Mallorca – 2018–19
- Stevan Stošić – Málaga – 2006–07
- Vlada Stošić – Mallorca – 1992–94
- Igor Taševski – Villarreal, Elche, Gijón – 1999–2000, 2001–05
- Ivan Tomić – Rayo Vallecano – 2003–04
- **Nemanja Tošić** – **Deportivo La Coruña** – 2024–
- Saša Zdjelar – Mallorca – 2016–17
- Igor Zlatanović – Numancia, Castellón – 2019–21

== Sierra Leone ==
- Mustapha Bundu – FC Andorra – 2022–23

== Slovakia ==
- Erik Jirka – Mirandés, Real Oviedo – 2020–22
- Marián Kelemen – Tenerife – 2004–06
- **Sebastian Kóša** – **Zaragoza** – 2024–
- Róbert Mazáň – Tenerife – 2019–20
- Samuel Mráz – Mirandés – 2022–23
- Peter Pokorný – Real Sociedad B – 2021–22
- Samuel Slovák – Tenerife – 1999–2000
- **Martin Valjent** – **Mallorca** – 2018–19, 2020–21, 2026–

== Slovenia ==
- **Mateo Aćimović** – **Las Palmas** – 2026–
- David Flakus Bosilj – Castellón – 2024–25
- Ziga Frelih – Mirandés – 2022–23
- Rene Krhin – Castellón – 2020–21
- Milan Osterc – Hércules – 1998–2000
- **Martin Pečar** – **Tenerife** – 2026–
- Matej Pučko – Osasuna, Real Oviedo – 2015–16, 2017–18
- Haris Vučkić – Real Zaragoza – 2020–21

== South Korea ==
- **Kim Min-Su** – Andorra, **Girona** – 2025–

== Sweden ==
- Simon Eriksson – Racing Santander – 2025–26
- Edier Frejd – Las Palmas – 2002–03
- Isak Jansson – Cartagena – 2022–24
- Mikael Martinsson – Castellón – 1987–88
- Olof Mellberg – Villarreal – 2012–13
- Markus Holgersson – Lorca – 2017–18
- Nemanja Miljanović – Hércules – 1997–99
- Esad Razić – Racing Ferrol – 2002–03
- Fredrik Söderström – Córdoba – 2004–05

== Switzerland ==
- **Gabriel Barès** – **Burgos** – 2024–
- Kevin Bua – Leganés – 2020–21
- Oliver Buff – Real Zaragoza – 2017–19
- Lorenzo González – Málaga – 2019–20
- Simone Grippo – Real Zaragoza, Real Oviedo – 2017–21
- Neftali Manzambi – Gijón, Córdoba – 2018–21

== Tanzania ==
- Shaaban Idd Chilunda – Tenerife – 2018–19

== Togo ==
- Djené Dakonam – Alcorcón – 2014–16
- Simon Gbegnon – Mirandés – 2019–20

== Tunisia ==
- **Ismaël Gharbi** – **Leganés** – 2026–
- Haythem Jouini – Tenerife – 2016–17
- Kader – Numancia – 2014–15
- Junas Naciri – Racing Santander, Real Valladolid, Real Murcia – 2001–02, 2010–13
- Lassad Nouioui – Deportivo La Coruña – 2011–12
- Adel Sellimi – Real Jaén – 1998–99

== Turkey ==
- Necati Ateş – Real Sociedad – 2008–09
- Sinan Bakış – FC Andorra, Real Zaragoza – 2022–24
- Emre Çolak – Deportivo La Coruña – 2019–20

== Ukraine ==
- Dmytro Khomchenovskyi – Ponferradina – 2015–16
- **Vladyslav Kopotun** – **Cadiz** – 2026–
- **Vladyslav Krapyvtsov** – **Girona** – 2026–
- Vasyl Kravets – Lugo – 2016–20
- Orest Lebedenko – Lugo – 2018–20, 2021–23
- Andriy Lunin – Real Oviedo – 2019–20
- Yaroslav Meykher – Logroñés – 2020–21
- Bogdan Milovanov – Gijón – 2019–22
- Serhiy Myakushko – Alcorcón – 2019–20
- **Oleksandr Pyshchur** – **Girona** – 2026–
- Yevhen Seleznyov – Málaga – 2018–19
- **Vladyslav Vanat** – **Girona** – 2026–
- Ivan Zotko – Elche – 2018–19
- Roman Zozulya – Albacete, Fuenlabrada – 2017–22

== United States ==
- Carlos Bocanegra – Racing Santander – 2012–13
- **Konrad de la Fuente** – Eibar, Ceuta, **Gijón** – 2023–24, 2025–
- **Nicholas Gioacchini** – **Sabadell** – 2026–
- Jonathan Gómez – Real Sociedad B, Mirandés – 2021–22, 2023–24
- Shaq Moore – Reus, Tenerife – 2018–22
- Tab Ramos – Figueres, Betis – 1990–94
- Peter Vermes – Figueres – 1991–92

== Uruguay ==
- Sebastián Abreu – Real Sociedad – 2008–09
- Eduardo Acevedo – Deportivo La Coruña – 1986–87
- Diego Aguirre – Marbella, Ourense – 1993–95
- Martín Alaniz – Real Oviedo – 2016–17
- **Agustín Albarracín** – **Albacete** – 2026–
- Nicolás Albarracín – Lugo – 2017–18
- Diego Alonso – Atlético Madrid, Real Murcia – 2001–02, 2005–06
- Iván Alonso – Deportivo Alavés, Real Murcia – 2003–07, 2008–09
- Matías Alonso – Real Murcia – 2009–10
- Agustín Álvarez – Elche – 2024–25
- Matías Arezo – Granada – 2022–23
- Sebastián Balsas – Córdoba – 2011–12
- Eduardo Belza – Atlético Madrid B, Rayo Vallecano, Tenerife Las Palmas – 1981–84, 1986–87, 1988–89, 1990–92
- Carlos Benavidez – Deportivo Alavés – 2022–23
- Mariano Bogliacino – Las Palmas – 2003–04
- Juan Boselli – Albacete – 2018–19
- Miguel Bossio – Valencia, Sabadell – 1986–87, 1991–92
- Gastón Brugman – Real Oviedo – 2021–22
- Carlos Bueno – Real Sociedad – 2009–10
- Santiago Bueno – Girona – 2019–22
- Erick Cabaco – Granada – 2022–23
- Javier Cabrera – Recreativo – 2014–15
- Leandro Cabrera – Recreativo, Numancia, Hércules, Real Madrid Castilla, Real Zaragoza, Espanyol – 2010–17, 2020–21, 2023–24
- Fabián Canobbio – Celta Vigo – 2004–05, 2007–08
- James Cantero – Lleida, Real Murcia – 1990–92, 1993–94
- Felipe Carballo – Sevilla Atlético – 2017–18
- Gabri Cardozo – Extremadura UD – 2019–20
- Fabián Coelho – Elche – 2006–08
- Fernando Correa – Atlético Madrid, Real Valladolid – 2000–02, 2005–06
- Gabriel Correa – Real Murcia, Mérida, Sevilla – 1990–92, 1994–95, 1996–97, 1998–99
- Guillermo Cotugno – Real Oviedo – 2017–18
- Sebastián Cristóforo – Girona, FC Cartagena – 2020–22
- Guillermo de Amores – Gijón – 2022–23
- Lautaro de León – Cartagena, Mirandés – 2023–24
- Gustavo Díaz – Albacete – 1998–99
- Jorge Díaz – Albacete, Real Zaragoza, Numancia, Reus – 2014–17
- Carlos Diogo – Real Zaragoza, Huesca – 2008–09, 2012–13, 2014–15
- Robert Ergas – Albacete – 2019–20
- Alfonso Espino – Cádiz – 2018–20
- Gabriel Fernández – Real Zaragoza – 2020–21
- **Martín Fernández** – **Albacete** – 2025–
- **Sebastián Figueredo** – **Leganés** – 2025–
- Andrés Ferrari – Villarreal CF B – 2023–24
- Óscar Ferro – Compostela – 1999–2000
- **Sebastián Figueredo** – **Leganés** – 2025–
- Andrés Fleurquin – Córdoba, Cádiz – 2003–05, 2006–10
- Carlos Andrés García – Vecindario – 2006–07
- Pablo García – Atlético Madrid B – 1998–2000
- Eduardo Gerolami – Recreativo – 1975–78
- Emiliano Gómez – Albacete – 2020–21
- Ernesto Goñi – Almería – 2015–16
- Cristian González (1976) – Las Palmas – 2002–03
- Cristian González (1996) – Sevilla Atlético, Mirandés – 2016–18, 2019–20
- **Facundo González** – **Racing Santander** – 2025–
- Nacho González – Hércules – 2012–13
- Ramiro Guerra – Gimnàstic – 2018–19
- Facundo Guichón – Alcorcón, Deportivo Alavés, UCAM Murcia – 2014–17
- **Emanuel Gularte** – **Gijón** – 2026–
- Adrián Gunino – Almería, Córdoba – 2012–14
- Álvaro Gutiérrez – Rayo Vallecano, Gijón – 1997–98, 2000–01
- **Thiago Helguera** – **Mirandés** – 2025–
- José Herrera – Figueres – 1989–90
- Santiago Homenchenko – Real Oviedo, Mirandés – 2023–25
- Diego Ifrán – Deportivo La Coruña, Tenerife – 2013–15
- Andrés Lamas – Las Palmas, Recreativo – 2009–11
- **Ignacio Laquintana** – **Huesca** – 2025–
- Martín Lasarte – Deportivo La Coruña – 1989–91
- Mauricio Lemos – Las Palmas – 2019–20
- Josemir Lujambio – Rayo Vallecano – 1998–99
- Adrián Luna – Gimnàstic, Sabadell – 2011–12
- Arsenio Luzardo – Recreativo – 1985–90
- Federico Magallanes – Eibar – 2005–06
- Guillermo Méndez – Alcorcón – 2013–14
- Hernán Menosse – Recreativo, Granada, Lugo – 2013–15, 2017–19
- Miguel Merentiel – Lorca – 2017–18
- **Fernando Mimbacas** – **Burgos** – 2024–
- Óscar Javier Morales – Real Valladolid, Málaga – 2005–07
- Richard Morales – Málaga – 2006–07
- Santiago Mouriño – Real Zaragoza – 2023–24
- Álvaro Núñez – Numancia – 2001–04, 2005–08
- Darwin Núñez – Almería – 2019–20
- **Brian Ocampo** – **Cádiz** – 2024–
- Lucas Olaza – Real Valladolid – 2021–22
- Mathías Olivera – Albacete – 2018–19
- Nicolás Olivera – Sevilla, Córdoba – 1998–99, 2000–01, 2003–04
- Antonio Pacheco – Albacete – 2004–06
- Walter Pandiani – Villarreal – 2012–13
- Danilo Peinado – Recreativo – 2011–12
- Maximiliano Pérez – Tenerife – 2014–15
- **Gonzalo Petit** – **Mirandés** – 2025–
- Inti Podestá – Sevilla – 2000–01
- Nicolás Raimondi – Cartagena – 2012–13
- Leonardo Ramos – Salamanca – 2000–01
- **Jeremía Recoba** – **Las Palmas** – 2025–
- Mario Regueiro – Racing Santander – 2001–02
- Federico Ricca – Málaga – 2018–19
- Diego Riolfo – Recreativo – 2012–13
- Ignacio Risso – Ponferradina – 2006–07
- Braian Rodríguez – Numancia – 2014–15
- Brian Rodríguez – Almería – 2020–21
- Julio Rodríguez – Lleida, Numancia – 1995–99
- Sergio Rodríguez Viera – Málaga, Hércules – 1951–52, 1956–58
- Marcelo Romero – Málaga – 2006–07
- Juan Manuel Salgueiro – Real Murcia – 2006–07
- Gonzalo de los Santos – Málaga, Hércules – 1998–99, 2006–08
- Michael Santos – Gijón, Leganés – 2017–18, 2020–21
- Juan Manuel Sanabria – Real Zaragoza – 2020–21
- **Lucas Sanseviero** – **Valladolid** – 2025–
- Marcelo Saracchi – Levante – 2022–23
- Nicolás Schenone – Deportivo Alavés – 2013–14
- Andrés Schetino – Sevilla B – 2016–17
- Nicolás Schiappacasse – Rayo Majadahonda – 2018–19
- Jimmy Schmidt – Hércules – 2005–06
- Gastón Silva – FC Cartagena – 2021–22
- Marcelo Silva – Almería, Las Palmas, Real Valladolid, Real Zaragoza – 2011–13, 2014–17
- Tabaré Silva – Sevilla, Levante – 1998–99, 2000–02
- **Cristhian Stuani** – Albacete, Girona – 2010–11, 2019–22, 2026–
- Damián Suárez – Elche, Getafe – 2012–13, 2016–17
- Sebastián Taborda – Hércules – 2008–09
- Marcelo Tejera – Logroñés – 1997–99
- Franco Torgnascioli – Lorca – 2017–18
- Gastón Valles – Espanyol, Cartagena – 2023–25
- Emiliano Velázquez – Rayo Vallecano – 2017–18, 2019–21
- Maximiliano Villa – Ponferradina – 2019–20
- Federico Viñas – Real Oviedo – 2024–25
- Giovanni Zarfino – Extremadura UD, Tenerife, Alcorcón, Gijón, Castellón – 2018–25
- Joaquín Zeballos – Girona – 2019–21

== Venezuela ==
- Julio Álvarez – Racing Santander, Real Murcia, Numancia, Tenerife – 2001–02, 2004–08, 2010–17
- **Juan Arango Jr.** – **Girona** – 2026–
- Jovanny Bolívar – Albacete, Huesca – 2022–24
- Ces Cotos – CD Lugo – 2022–23
- Rolf Feltscher – Getafe, Real Zaragoza – 2016–17
- Víctor García – Alcorcón, Cultural Leonesa – 2020–22, 2025–26
- Alexander González – Huesca, Elche, Mirandés – 2015–20
- Andreé González – Recreativo – 1999–2000
- Dani Hernández – Huesca, Real Valladolid, Tenerife – 2009–10, 2011–12, 2014–22
- Jonay Hernández – Córdoba, Ciudad Murcia – 2004–06
- Juanpi – Málaga – 2018–20
- Darwin Machís – Hércules, Huesca, Granada, Cádiz – 2013–14, 2015–16, 2017–19
- Josua Mejías – Gimnàstic – 2018–19
- Miku – Ciudad Murcia, Gimnàstic, Salamanca, Rayo Vallecano – 2006–09, 2016–17
- Manuel Morais – Lugo – 2019–21
- Ruberth Morán – Córdoba – 1999–2000
- Daniel Noriega – Rayo Vallecano – 1997–98
- Ricardo Páez – Castellón – 2009–10
- Adalberto Peñaranda – Las Palmas – 2021–22
- Álex Pereira – Gijón, Recreativo – 2000–02, 2003–05
- Leomar Pinto – Elche – 2016–17
- Rafael Ponzo – Tenerife – 2008–09
- Eric Ramírez – Gijón – 2021–22
- José Manuel Rey – Pontevedra – 2004–05
- Diosbert Rivero – Extremadura – 2018–19
- Aristóteles Romero – Rayo Majadahonda – 2018–19
- Salomón Rondón – Las Palmas – 2008–10
- Roberto Rosales – Leganés – 2020–21
- Christian Santos – Deportivo La Coruña – 2018–20
- Juan Carlos Socorro – Las Palmas, Elche – 1996–2001
- Samuel Sosa – Alcorcón – 2019–21
- Jeffrén Suárez – Real Valladolid – 2014–15
- Andrés Túñez – Celta Vigo, Elche – 2009–12, 2016–17
- Mikel Villanueva – Cádiz, Reus, Gimnàstic, Málaga – 2017–20
- Jorge Yriarte – Eibar, Amorebieta – 2023–24
- Renzo Zambrano – Real Valladolid – 2016–17

== Wales ==
- Nathan Jones – Badajoz – 1995–96
- David Vaughan – Real Sociedad – 2007–08

== Zambia ==
- Francisco Mwepu – Cádiz – 2024–25

== See also ==
- List of foreign La Liga players (Primera División)

== Notes ==
1. Born in Angola
2. Born in Angola (then Portuguese Angola)
3. Born in Argentina
4. Born in Bosnia and Herzegovina
5. Born in Bosnia and Herzegovina (then part of SFR Yugoslavia)
6. Born in Brazil
7. Born in Cameroon
8. Born in Canada
9. Born in Cape Verde
10. Born in Colombia
11. Born in Croatia
12. Born in Croatia (then part of SFR Yugoslavia)
13. Born in Curaçao (constituent country of the Kingdom of the Netherlands, then part of the Netherlands Antilles)
14. Born in the Democratic Republic of Congo
15. Born in the Democratic Republic of Congo (then Zaïre)
16. Born in Djibouti
17. Born in Ecuador
18. Born in England
19. Born in France
20. Born in Gambia
21. Born in Germany
22. Born in Ghana
23. Born in Guinea-Bissau
24. Born in Guinea-Bissau (then Portuguese Guinea)
25. Born in Israel
26. Born in Italy
27. Born in Ivory Coast
28. Born in Kenya
29. Born in Kosovo (then part of SFR Yugoslavia)
30. Born in Luxembourg
31. Born in Mexico
32. Born in Morocco
33. Born in the Netherlands
34. Born in the Nigeria
35. Born in the North Macedonia (then part of the SFR Yugoslavia)
36. Born in Portugal
37. Born in Romania
38. Born in Russia
39. Born in São Tomé and Príncipe (then Portuguese São Tomé and Príncipe)
40. Born in Scotland
41. Born in Senegal
42. Born in Serbia (then SFR Yugoslavia)
43. Born in Serbia (then FR Yugoslavia)
44. Born in Serbia (then Serbia and Montenegro)
45. Born in Singapore
46. Born in Spain
47. Born in Sweden
48. Born in Switzerland
49. Born in Ukraine
50. Born in Ukraine (then part of the Soviet Union)
51. Born in Uruguay
52. Born in the Western Sahara
53. Capped for the Argentina national under-20 football team
54. Capped for the Catalonia national football team
55. Capped for the Croatia national under-19 football team
56. Capped for the Croatia national under-18 football team
57. Capped for the Croatia national under-17 football team
58. Capped for the Denmark national under-21 football team
59. Capped for the Denmark national under-20 football team
60. Capped for the Denmark national under-19 football team
61. Capped for the Denmark national under-18 football team
62. Capped for the Denmark national under-17 football team
63. Capped for the England national under-16 football team
64. Capped for the France national under-23 football team
65. Capped for the France national under-21 football team
66. Capped for the France national under-20 football team
67. Capped for the France national under-19 football team
68. Capped for the France national under-18 football team
69. Capped for the France national under-17 football team
70. Capped for the France national under-16 football team
71. Capped for the Italy national under-20 football team
72. Capped for the Italy national under-19 football team
73. Capped for the Mexico national under-20 football team
74. Capped for the Mexico national under-16 football team
75. Capped for the Montenegro national under-21 football team
76. Capped for the Netherlands national under-21 football team
77. Capped for the Netherlands national under-20 football team
78. Capped for the Netherlands national under-19 football team
79. Capped for the Netherlands national under-18 football team
80. Capped for the Netherlands national under-17 football team
81. Capped for the Netherlands national under-15 football team
82. Capped for the Norway national under-21 football team
83. Capped for the Norway national under-20 football team
84. Capped for the Norway national under-19 football team
85. Capped for the Norway national under-18 football team
86. Capped for the Norway national under-17 football team
87. Capped for the Padania national football team
88. Capped for the Portugal national football team
89. Capped for the Portugal national under-23 football team
90. Capped for the Portugal national under-21 football team
91. Capped for the Portugal national under-20 football team
92. Capped for the Portugal national under-19 football team
93. Capped for the Portugal national under-18 football team
94. Capped for the Portugal national under-17 football team
95. Capped for the Portugal national under-16 football team
96. Capped for the Romania national under-17 football team
97. Capped for the Romania national under-16 football team
98. Capped for the Republic of Ireland national under-17 football team
99. Capped for the Russia national under-21 football team
100. Capped for the Russia national under-20 football team
101. Capped for the Russia national under-19 football team
102. Capped for the Russia national under-18 football team
103. Capped for the Russia national under-17 football team
104. Capped for the Russia national under-16 football team
105. Capped for the Russia national under-15 football team
106. Capped for the Serbia national football team
107. Capped for the Serbia national under-21 football team
108. Capped for the Serbia national under-19 football team
109. Capped for the Serbia national under-17 football team
110. Capped for the Serbia national under-16 football team
111. Capped for the Spain national under-23 football team
112. Capped for the Spain national under-21 football team
113. Capped for the Spain national under-20 football team
114. Capped for the Spain national under-19 football team
115. Capped for the Spain national under-18 football team
116. Capped for the Spain national under-17 football team
117. Capped for the Spain national under-16 football team
118. Capped for the Spain national under-15 football team
119. Capped for the Sweden national under-21 football team
120. Capped for the Sweden men's national under-19 football team
121. Capped for the Sweden national under-18 football team
122. Capped for the Sweden men's national under-17 football team
123. Capped for the Sweden national under-16 football team
124. Capped for the Switzerland national under-21 football team
125. Capped for the Switzerland national under-20 football team
126. Capped for the Switzerland national under-19 football team
127. Capped for the Switzerland national under-18 football team
128. Capped for the Switzerland national under-17 football team
129. Capped for the Switzerland national under-16 football team
130. Capped for the Switzerland national under-15 football team
131. Capped for the Ukraine national football team
132. Capped for the Ukraine national under-21 football team
133. Capped for the Ukraine national under-20 football team
134. Capped for the Ukraine national under-19 football team
135. Capped for the Ukraine national under-18 football team
136. Capped for the Ukraine national under-17 football team
