= Pedro Fernández =

Pedro Fernández may refer to:

- Pedro Fernández (politician) (born 1970), Spanish politician
- Pedro Fernández (sailor) (born 1964), Cuban Olympic sailor
- Pedro Fernández (singer) (born 1969), Mexican singer, songwriter, actor, and television host
- Pedro Fernández (Paraguayan footballer) (born 1946), Paraguayan footballer who played as a defender
- Pedro Fernández (Venezuelan footballer) (born 1977), Venezuelan footballer who played as a midfielder
- Pedro Fernández (Argentine footballer) (born 1987), Argentine professional footballer
- Pedro Fernandez (baseball) (born 1994), Dominican professional baseball player
- Dro Fernández (born 2008), Spanish footballer

== See also ==
- Peter Fernandez (1927–2010), American actor, voice director, and writer
