= Guillermo Muñoz =

Guillermo Muñoz may refer to:

- Guillermo Muñoz (footballer, born 1961), Mexican footballer
- Guillermo Muñoz (footballer, born 1953) (1953–2016), Chilean footballer
- Guillermo Muñoz (table tennis) (born 1964), Mexican table tennis player
- Guillermo Muñoz Zúñiga (1937–1999), Chilean accountant and politician
