= Salifo Caropitche =

Bissau-Guinean footballer

Personal information
- Full name: Salifo Caropitche Mendes
- Date of birth: 19 June 2001 (age 25)
- Place of birth: Bafatá, Guinea-Bissau
- Height: 1.90 m (6 ft 3 in)
- Position: Forward

Team information
- Current team: Tenerife

Youth career
- Estefut
- Lanzarote
- Estefut
- Altavista
- Orientación Marítima

Senior career*
Years	Team	Apps	(Gls)
2020–2021	Tahíche		
2021–2022	Mensajero	22	(2)
2022–2023	Mirandés B	25	(3)
2022	Mirandés	1	(0)
2023–2025	Tenerife B	47	(13)
2023–	Tenerife	2	(0)
2025–2026	→ Guadalajara (loan)	20	(6)
- * Club domestic league appearances and goals as of 10 June 2026

Salifo Caropitche Mendes (born 19 June 2001), sometimes known as just Salifo, is a Bissau-Guinean footballer who plays as a forward for Spanish club CD Tenerife.

== Early life ==
Born in the small village of Bafatá, Salifo moved abroad as a baby with his family, staying in Dakar for a week before boarding a plane towards the Canary Islands. They went on to live in Arrecife.

== Club career ==
After beginning his career at CD Estefut, Salifo played for UD Lanzarote and Altavista CF before finishing his training with CD Orientación Marítima. In 2020, he moved to the Interinsular Preferente de Las Palmas side CD Tahíche, and scored on a regular basis during the season.

On 23 July 2021, Salifo joined the Segunda División RFEF side CD Mensajero. Roughly one year later, he signed a two-year contract with CD Mirandés, being initially assigned to the reserves in the Tercera Federación.

Salifo made his professional debut with the Jabatos on 13 August 2022, coming on as a late substitute for Raúl García in a 1–1 Segunda División home draw against Sporting de Gijón. On 8 July of the following year, he moved to another reserve team, CD Tenerife B also in the fifth division.

Salifo made his first team debut with Tete on 26 November 2023, replacing Roberto López late into a 1–1 home draw against FC Cartagena, and helped the B's to achieve promotion to Segunda Federación at the end of the campaign. On 14 July 2025, he renewed his contract for two years, and was loaned to Primera Federación newcomers CD Guadalajara, for one year.
