= Georges Nsukula =

French footballer (born 2003)

Personal information
- Full name: Georges Robert Júnior Nsukula Mazeya
- Date of birth: 15 February 2003 (age 23)
- Place of birth: France
- Position: Winger

Team information
- Current team: Ibiza
- Number: 14

Youth career
- 2010–2021: Montfermeil
- 2021–2022: Badajoz

Senior career*
Years	Team	Apps	(Gls)
2021–2022	Badajoz B	4	(0)
2022–2024	Júpiter Leonés	45	(5)
2024–2026	Burgos B	45	(5)
2024–2026	Burgos	1	(0)
2026–	Ibiza	18	(0)
- * Club domestic league appearances and goals as of 10 June 2026

Georges Robert Júnior Nsukula Mazeya (born 15 February 2003) is a French footballer who plays mainly as a left winger for Spanish Primera Federación club Ibiza.

== Career ==
Nsukula played for FC Montfermeil 93 before moving to Spain with CD Badajoz in October 2020. Initially assigned to the Juvenil squad, he made his senior debut with the reserves on 24 October 2021, coming on as a second-half substitute in a 1–1 Tercera División RFEF away draw against CD Miajadas.

On 18 August 2022, after finishing his formation, Nsukula signed for Cultural y Deportiva Leonesa and was assigned to the B-team also in division five. He left the club after scoring five goals in the 2023–24 season, and moved to another reserve team, Burgos CF Promesas, on 29 July 2024.

Nsukula made his first team debut on 1 December 2024, replacing Miguel Atienza late into a 3–1 Segunda División away loss to Levante UD.

On 16 January 2026, Nsukula signed a three-and-a-half-year contract with Ibiza in the third tier.
