= Junas Naciri =

Dutch footballer

Personal information
- Full name: Junas Naciri
- Date of birth: 18 June 1973 (age 53)
- Place of birth: Diemen, Netherlands
- Height: 1.77 m (5 ft 9 1/2 in)
- Position: Midfielder

Youth career
- Ajax

Senior career*
Years	Team	Apps	(Gls)
1991–1993	Telstar	17	(0)
1993–1995	Lugo	31	(1)
1995–2000	Haarlem	123	(19)
2000–2003	União Madeira	88	(14)
2003–2005	Rio Ave	43	(4)
2005–2006	Moreirense	13	(0)
2006–2008	Enosis Neon	21	(0)
2008–2009	Lavrense		
Total		336	(38)
- * Club domestic league appearances and goals

Junas Naciri (born 18 June 1973) is a Dutch retired footballer who played as a midfielder.

== Football career ==
Naciri was born in Diemen, North Holland. After unsuccessfully emerging through AFC Ajax's youth system, he played for Telstar and HFC Haarlem in the Dutch second division, with a spell in Spain in between with lowly CD Lugo.

In 2000, Naciri moved to Portugal, starting with third level's C.F. União. His solid performances attracted the attention of Rio Ave F.C. in the Primeira Liga, where he would be regularly used during two seasons (34 starts), with the Vila do Conde club always retaining its status.

After one year with Moreirense FC (division two), Naciri moved to Cyprus and spent two campaigns in the First Division with Enosis Neon Paralimni FC, after which he returned to Portugal at the age of 35, with União Desportiva Lavrense in the second regional league of Porto.
