= Epifanio Benítez =

Paraguayan footballer (born 1954)

Personal information
- Full name: Epifanio Bengoechea Benítez
- Date of birth: 12 July 1954 (age 72)
- Place of birth: Villa San Pedro, Paraguay
- Position: Defender

Senior career*
Years	Team	Apps	(Gls)
1975–1979	Elche	59	(0)
- * Club domestic league appearances and goals

Epifanio Bengoechea Benítez (born 12 July 1954) is a Paraguayan retired footballer who played for Spanish club Elche, as a defender.
