= Sebastián Figueredo =

Uruguayan footballer (born 2002)

Personal information
- Full name: Sebastián María Figueredo Vilar del Valle
- Date of birth: 25 August 2001 (age 25)
- Place of birth: Montevideo, Uruguay
- Height: 1.79 m (5 ft 10 in)
- Position: Right-back

Team information
- Current team: Iberia 1999 (on loan from Leganés)

Youth career
- Montevideo Wanderers

Senior career*
Years	Team	Apps	(Gls)
2022–2025	Montevideo Wanderers	58	(1)
2025–	Leganés	16	(0)
2026–	→ Iberia 1999 (loan)	0	(0)

International career
2023	Uruguay U23	4	(0)
- * Club domestic league appearances and goals as of 9 June 2026

Sebastián María Figueredo Vilar del Valle (born 25 August 2001) is a Uruguayan professional footballer who plays as a right-back for Georgian club Iberia 1999, on loan from Spanish side Leganés.

== Club career ==
=== Montevideo Wanderers ===
Born in Montevideo, Figueredo was a Montevideo Wanderers youth graduate. He made was promoted to first team for the 2022 season, and made his professional – and Primera División – debut on 2 April of that year, starting in a 0–0 away draw against Danubio.

Figueredo scored his first professional goal on 1 July 2023, netting the fourth in a 4–0 home routing of River Plate Montevideo. In May of the following year, he broke his fifth metatarsus and was sidelined for nearly four months, but was unable to regain his starting spot upon returning.

=== Leganés ===
On 14 July 2025, Figueredo signed a three-year contract with Segunda División side Leganés. On 2 August of the following year, he was loaned to Georgian side Iberia 1999 for one year.

== International career ==
In September 2023, Figueredo was called up to the Uruguay national under-23 team for the 2023 Pan American Games. He played in all four matches during the tournament as his side finished fifth.
