= Afonso Taira =

Portuguese footballer

Personal information
- Full name: Afonso Miguel Castro Vilhena Taira
- Date of birth: 17 June 1992 (age 34)
- Place of birth: Cascais, Portugal
- Height: 1.77 m (5 ft 10 in)
- Position: Defensive midfielder

Team information
- Current team: Al-Najma
- Number: 5

Youth career
- 2002–2003: Internacional Almancil
- 2003–2006: Estoril
- 2006–2011: Sporting CP

Senior career*
Years	Team	Apps	(Gls)
2011–2014	Córdoba	2	(0)
2012–2014	→ Atlético (loan)	67	(2)
2014–2017	Estoril	64	(1)
2017–2018	Ironi Kiryat Shmona	31	(0)
2018–2019	Beitar Jerusalem	17	(1)
2019–2020	Hermannstadt	10	(0)
2020–2021	B-SAD	32	(0)
2021–2023	Casa Pia	56	(0)
2023–2024	Al-Kholood	33	(1)
2024–2025	Al Batin	27	(1)
2025–2026	Abha	29	(2)
2026–	Al-Najma	11	(0)

International career
2007–2008	Portugal U16	5	(0)
2008–2009	Portugal U17	11	(0)
2010	Portugal U18	3	(0)
2011	Portugal U19	8	(0)
- * Club domestic league appearances and goals as of 23:30, 10 November 2026 (UTC)

Afonso Miguel Castro Vilhena Taira (born 17 June 1992) is a Portuguese professional footballer who plays as a defensive midfielder for Saudi First Division League club Al-Najma.

== Club career ==
Born in Cascais, Lisbon, Taira joined Sporting CP's youth system in 2006 (aged 14) from neighbouring G.D. Estoril Praia. He made his professional debut in 2011 with Córdoba CF in the Spanish Segunda División, signing a three-year contract but making only three competitive appearances during his only season in Andalusia.

In 2012–13, Taira returned to his country after being loaned to Atlético Clube de Portugal of the Segunda Liga. The move was extended for the following campaign.

Taira returned to his former youth club Estoril on 8 June 2014, after agreeing to a four-year deal. He played 13 Primeira Liga matches in his first year, in an eventual 12th-place finish.

Taira scored his only Portuguese top-flight goal on 24 October 2015, in a 2–2 home draw against Rio Ave FC. On 19 July 2017, he signed with Israeli Premier League team Hapoel Ironi Kiryat Shmona FC, and a year later Beitar Jerusalem F.C. in the same competition.

After spending the 2019–20 season in the Romanian Liga I with FC Hermannstadt, Taira joined top-tier B-SAD on a two-year contract. On 31 August 2021, he moved to Casa Pia A.C. one league below, totalling 28 games in his first season (24 in the league, one assist) to help to a return to the main division after 83 years away.

In June 2023, Taira signed with Saudi First Division League club Al-Kholood Club. He remained in the country and league the following seasons, with Al Batin FC and Abha Club.

== Personal life ==
Taira's father, José, was also a footballer and a midfielder. He appeared in more than 100 games in the Portuguese top tier, and also spent six years in Spain, representing mainly UD Salamanca.
