= Noah Ukwuije =

French footballer (born 2007)

Personal information
- Full name: Noah Obioma Ukwuije
- Date of birth: 11 December 2007 (age 18)
- Place of birth: Rouen, France
- Position: Centre-back

Team information
- Current team: Cádiz B

Youth career
- 2017–2024: Quevilly-Rouen
- 2024–2025: Cádiz

Senior career*
| Years | Team | Apps | (Gls) |
| 2025 | Cádiz C | 4 | (0) |
| 2025– | Cádiz B | 13 | (0) |
| 2026 | → Atlético Sanluqueño (loan) | 19 | (0) |
| 2026– | Cádiz | 1 | (0) |
- * Club domestic league appearances and goals as of 15 August 2026

Noah Obioma Ukwuije (born 11 December 2007) is a French footballer who plays as a centre-back for Spanish club Cádiz Mirandilla.

== Career ==
Born in Rouen, Ukwuije joined the youth categories of Cádiz in July 2024, from hometown side Quevilly-Rouen. In that season, he mainly featured with the Juvenil squad, but also made his senior debut with the C-team in the División de Honor.

Promoted to the reserves in Tercera Federación ahead of the 2025–26 campaign, Ukwuije renewed his contract until 2029 in December 2025. On 16 January 2026, he and another three Cádiz players were loaned to Primera Federación side Atlético Sanluqueño CF, until June.

Back to Cádiz in July 2026, Ukwuije spent the entire pre-season with the first team, and made his professional debut on 15 August of that year, starting in a 0–0 Segunda División home draw against RC Celta Fortuna.
