= José Taira =

Portuguese footballer

Personal information
- Full name: José Américo Taira Costa Pereira
- Date of birth: 18 November 1968 (age 57)
- Place of birth: Lisbon, Portugal
- Height: 1.80 m (5 ft 11 in)
- Position: Defensive midfielder

Youth career
- 1977–1978: Atlético
- 1982–1985: Oeiras
- 1985–1987: Belenenses

Senior career*
Years	Team	Apps	(Gls)
1987–1989	Montijo	24	(3)
1989–1994	Belenenses	96	(6)
1994–1995	Estrela Amadora	7	(0)
1995–1996	Belenenses	29	(2)
1996–2000	Salamanca	127	(7)
2000–2002	Sevilla	19	(1)
2002–2003	Farense	18	(0)
2003–2004	Oriental	26	(1)
Total		346	(20)

International career
1996	Portugal	1	(0)
- * Club domestic league appearances and goals

José Américo Taira Costa Pereira (born 18 November 1968), known as Taira, is a Portuguese former professional footballer who played as a defensive midfielder.

== Club career ==
Born in Lisbon, Taira was released by C.F. Os Belenenses manager Henri Depireux in 1987, but after two good years at C.D. Montijo in the Segunda Liga he returned to his hometown club. He was part of the sides that were relegated from the Primeira Liga in 1991 and promoted back a year later.

Taira was signed for C.F. Estrela da Amadora in the summer of 1994 by coach João Alves, who was dismissed before the start of the campaign. He played only seven matches under his successor Acácio Casimiro, and then returned to Belenenses a year later, now managed by Alves; in his only season back at the Estádio do Restelo, the side finished sixth.

When Alves was hired by UD Salamanca of the Spanish Segunda División, he brought the core of the team to his new employers, including Taira. On 9 October 1996, he made his only appearance for Portugal in a 3–0 win away to Albania in the 1998 FIFA World Cup qualifiers, replacing Oceano for the final 17 minutes in Tirana – this made him the first player to debut for the country while playing abroad.

Salamanca were relegated from La Liga in 1998–99 and a year later Taira joined Sevilla FC, winning promotion to that competition as champions in his debut campaign. In 2002 he returned to Portugal, spending one year with S.C. Farense in the second tier and another with Clube Oriental de Lisboa in the lower leagues before retiring at 35.

After playing for their veterans, in July 2018 Taira was appointed director of football at former club Belenenses, who had been relegated to the Lisbon Football Association leagues after the spin-off of their professional team into B-SAD.

== Personal life ==
Taira's son, Afonso, was also a footballer and a midfielder.
