= Juan Catafau =

Chilean footballer (born 1951)

Personal information
- Full name: Juan Antonio Catafau Vignes
- Date of birth: 19 April 1951 (age 75)
- Place of birth: Santiago, Chile
- Height: 1.78 m (5 ft 10 in)
- Position: Winger

Youth career
- Colchagua

Senior career*
Years	Team	Apps	(Gls)
1970	Colchagua		
1971–1973	Green Cross-Temuco	47	(9)
1974	Unión Española	0	(0)
1974–1977	Valencia	0	(0)
1975–1977	→ CD Mestalla (loan)		
1977–1978	Getafe Deportivo	9	(0)
1979	Palestino		
1979–1980	Green Cross-Temuco	58	(5)
1981	Deportes Concepción	29	(3)
1982–1983	Rangers	28	(3)
1984	Ñublense		
- * Club domestic league appearances and goals

Juan Antonio Catafau Vignes (born 19 April 1951) is a Chilean former footballer who played as a winger for clubs in Chile and Spain.

== Career ==
A winger from the Colchagua youth system, Catafau made his debut in 1970 in the Chilean Segunda División. In 1971, he switched to Green Cross-Temuco until 1973, becoming a well remembered player of the team.

In 1974, he played for Unión Española in the Copa Libertadores. After a tour through Spain with them following the FIFA World Cup and taking part in the La Línea de Concepción Tournament, he joined Valencia, becoming the second Chilean to play for the club after Higinio Ortúzar. After having no chances to make appearances in the league with the first team, he was loaned to CD Mestalla, getting promotion to the Spanish Tercera División in the 1976–77 season. In total, he made nine appearances and scored one goal for Valencia in both friendlies and matches at regional level before switching to Getafe Deportivo for the 1977–78 season, where he made nine appearances in the Spanish Segunda División.

In 1979, he returned to Chile and joined Palestino for two months. Next he played for Green Cross-Temuco, Deportes Concepción and Rangers de Talca in the top division.

His last club was Ñublense in 1984 in the Chilean Tercera División.

== Personal life ==
Catafau was born in Santiago, Chile, to a Catalan father from Sentmenat.

At the beginning of his stint in Valencia, he lived with his compatriot Carlos Caszely, a player of Levante UD at the time.

He was nicknamed Cata, a short form of Catafau.
