= Guillermo Muñoz (footballer, born 1953) =

Chilean footballer (1953–2016)

Personal information
- Full name: Guillermo Muñoz Muñoz
- Date of birth: 25 January 1953
- Place of birth: San Felipe, Chile
- Date of death: 11 April 2016 (aged 63)
- Place of death: Valparaíso, Chile
- Position: Forward

Youth career
- Escuela Industrial
- Liceo de Hombres
- Arturo Prat
- Unión Delicias
- Juventud Antoniana
- Chacabuco
- Centro Cultural
- Unión San Felipe
- 1970: Santiago Wanderers

Senior career*
Years	Team	Apps	(Gls)
1971–1973	Santiago Wanderers	64	(17)
1973–1979	Deportivo La Coruña	66	(21)
1977–1979	Deportivo Fabril	–	(–)
1981	Unión San Felipe		

International career
1973	Chile	8	(1)
- * Club domestic league appearances and goals

Guillermo Muñoz Muñoz (25 January 1953 – 11 April 2016) was a Chilean former footballer who played as a forward for clubs in Chile and Spain.

== Club career ==
As a youth player, Muñoz was with Escuela Industrial, Liceo de Hombres, Arturo Prat, Unión Delicias, Unión San Felipe, among others, in his city of birth, joining Santiago Wanderers in 1970. At professional level, he spent two and a half seasons with Santiago Wanderers in the Chilean Primera División from 1971 to 1973.

In 1973, he moved to Spain and joined Deportivo La Coruña for a quarter of a million dollars. He stayed with the club until the 1978–79 season, making also appearances for the reserve team, Deportivo Fabril.

His last club was Unión San Felipe in the 1981 Segunda División de Chile.

== International career ==
Muñoz made eight appearances and scored a goal for the Chile national team in 1973. He took part of friendlies, winning the Copa Carlos Dittborn against Argentina, and the 1974 FIFA World Cup qualification.

== Personal life ==
Muñoz was nicknamed Hallulla, as a type of slightly leavened white bread, due to the fact that his father was a baker.

On 3 August 2009, He was given the Premio a la Trayectoria Deportiva (Sport Career Award) by the Municipality of San Felipe.

In his last years, he worked as a caretaker at a company and died in 2016 due to a stomach cancer.

== Honours ==
Chile

- Copa Carlos Dittborn: 1973

Individual

- Sport Career Award (Municipality of San Felipe): 2009
