= Pedro Fernández (Paraguayan footballer) =

Paraguayan footballer (born 1946)

Personal information
- Full name: Pedro Fernández Cantero
- Date of birth: 29 April 1946 (age 80)
- Place of birth: Concepción, Paraguay
- Date of death: 21 November 2020
- Height: 1.76 m (5 ft 9 1/2 in)
- Position: Defender

Senior career*
| Years | Team | Apps | (Gls) |
| 1967–1969 | Barcelona | 8 | (0) |
| 1969–1978 | Granada | 192 | (5) |
| Total | | 200 | (5) |
- * Club domestic league appearances and goals

Pedro Fernández Cantero (born 29 April 1946) was a Paraguayan former footballer who played as a defender.

== Career ==
Fernández spent his entire career in Spain with Barcelona and Granada. He joined La Liga side Barcelona in 1967 and went onto play eight times over two seasons with the club; his final match for Barcelona was a 1–1 draw with Valencia on 16 April 1969. Ahead of the 1969–70 campaign, Fernández joined fellow La Liga club Granada. He made his Granada debut in September 1969 in a 0–1 win versus Pontevedra. Fernández remained with Granada until 1978 which included two hundred and twenty appearances and five goals. He holds the record for most appearances in La Liga for Granada (172).

== Career statistics ==
As of 8 January 2018.

Club statistics
| Club | Season | League | | | Cup (Note: Includes the Spanish Copa del Generalísimo) | | League Cup | | Continental | | Other (Note: Includes the European Cup Winners' Cup) | | Total | |
| Club | Season | Division | Apps | Goals | Apps | Goals | Apps | Goals | Apps | Goals | Apps | Goals | Apps | Goals |
|---|---|---|---|---|---|---|---|---|---|---|---|---|---|---|
| Barcelona | 1967–68 | La Liga | 0 | 0 | 0 | 0 | — | | — | | 0 | 0 | 0 | 0 |
| Barcelona | 1968–69 | La Liga | 8 | 0 | 0 | 0 | — | | — | | 3 (Note: Three appearances in 1968–69 European Cup Winners' Cup) | 0 | 11 | 0 |
| Barcelona | Total | | 8 | 0 | 0 | 0 | — | | — | | 3 | 0 | 11 | 0 |
| Granada | 1969–70 | La Liga | 25 | 1 | 3 | 0 | — | | — | | 0 | 0 | 28 | 1 |
| Granada | 1970–71 | La Liga | 23 | 0 | 3 | 0 | — | | — | | 0 | 0 | 26 | 0 |
| Granada | 1971–72 | La Liga | 30 | 2 | 6 | 0 | — | | — | | 0 | 0 | 36 | 2 |
| Granada | 1972–73 | La Liga | 30 | 0 | 5 | 0 | — | | — | | 0 | 0 | 35 | 0 |
| Granada | 1973–74 | La Liga | 30 | 1 | 5 | 0 | — | | — | | 0 | 0 | 35 | 1 |
| Granada | 1974–75 | La Liga | 16 | 0 | 3 | 0 | — | | — | | 0 | 0 | 19 | 0 |
| Granada | 1975–76 | La Liga | 18 | 0 | 3 | 0 | — | | — | | 0 | 0 | 21 | 0 |
| Granada | 1976–77 | Segunda División | 15 | 1 | 0 | 0 | — | | — | | 0 | 0 | 15 | 1 |
| Granada | 1977–78 | Segunda División | 5 | 0 | 0 | 0 | — | | — | | 0 | 0 | 5 | 0 |
| Granada | Total | | 192 | 5 | 28 | 0 | — | | — | | 0 | 0 | 220 | 5 |
| Career total | | | 200 | 5 | 28 | 0 | — | | — | | 3 | 0 | 231 | 5 |

== Honours ==
Barcelona

- Copa del Generalísimo: 1967–68
