= 2025–26 AD Ceuta FC season =

AD Ceuta FC
2025–26 season
- Manager: José Juan Romero
- Stadium: Estadio Alfonso Murube
- Segunda División: 15th
- Copa del Rey: TBD
- Top goalscorer: League: Marcos Fernández (2); All: Marcos Fernández (2)
- Highest home attendance: 5,043 vs Huesca
- Lowest home attendance: 4,473 vs Sporting Gijón
- Biggest win: Ceuta 2–1 Huesca
- Biggest defeat: Valladolid 3–0 Ceuta; Racing Santander 4–1 Ceuta

In the 2025–26 season, Agrupación Deportiva Ceuta Fútbol Club will participate in the Segunda División for the first time since 1968. The club will also take part in the Copa del Rey. The season began on August 15.

== Squad ==
=== Transfers In ===
Pos.	Player	Transferred from	Fee	Date	Source
FW	(France) Sofiane El Ftouhi	(Spain) Atlético Sanluqueño	Loan return	30 June 2025	
FW	(Spain) Taufek Bayoud	(Spain) Xerez CD	Loan return	30 June 2025	
MF	(Morocco) Anuar Tuhami	(Spain) Real Valladolid	Free	1 July 2025	
FW	(Spain) Juanto Ortuño	(Spain) CD Eldense	Free	1 July 2025	
FW	(Spain) Manu Vallejo	(Spain) Racing de Ferrol	Free	9 July 2025	
MF	(Burkina Faso) Aboubacar Bassinga	(Spain) UD Las Palmas	Loan	18 July 2025	
DF	(Spain) José Matos	(Spain) Cádiz CF	Free	21 July 2025	
MF	(France) Yann Bodiger	(Spain) CD Tenerife	Free	23 July 2025	
DF	(Spain) Diego González	(Spain) SD Huesca	Free	8 August 2025	
FW	(Spain) Marcos Fernández	(Spain) Espanyol	Loan	28 August 2025	
FW	(Ghana) Samuel Obeng	(Morocco) Wydad Casablanca	Free	1 September 2025	
MF	(United States) Konrad de la Fuente	(Switzerland) Lausanne-Sport	Loan	1 September 2025	
MF	(Spain) Salvi	Unattached	Free	4 September 2025	

=== Transfers Out ===
Pos.	Player	Transferred to	Fee	Date	Source
FW	(France) Sofiane El Ftouhi	(Spain) UD Ibiza	Undisclosed	27 July 2025	
MF	(Nigeria) Bless Aniekan	(Spain) Xerez CD	Loan	21 August 2025	
FW	(Spain) Taufek Bayoud	(Spain) UD Almería B	Undisclosed	25 August 2025	
MF	(Nigeria) Efe Ugiagbe	(Spain) Cádiz	€700,000	1 September 2025	

== Friendlies ==
13 July 2025	Ceuta (Spain)	1–4	(Portugal) União de Leiria
19:00 UTC+2

19 July 2025	Ceuta (Spain)	1–2	(Spain) Juventud Torremolinos
10:00 UTC+2

26 July 2025	Ceuta (Spain)	4–1	(Qatar) Al-Wakrah SC
19:00 UTC+2

2 August 2025	Cádiz CF (Spain)	0–3	(Spain) Ceuta
19:00 UTC+2

5 August 2025	Ceuta (Spain)	3–0	(Spain) Sevilla Atlético
19:00 UTC+2

== Competitions ==
=== Overall record ===
Competition	First match	Last match	Starting round	Record							
Competition	First match	Last match	Starting round	Pld	W	D	L	GF	GA	GD	Win %
Segunda División	15 August 2025	31 May 2026	Matchday 1	6	2	1	3	7	12	−5	33.33
Copa del Rey				0	0	0	0	0	0	+0	—
Total				6	2	1	3	7	12	−5	33.33

Last updated: 21 September 2025
Source: Competitions

=== Segunda División ===
==== Results summary ====
Pos	Team	Pld	W	D	L	GF	GA	GD	Pts
9	Córdoba	42	17	10	15	57	61	−4	61 (Note: Tied on head-to-head points. Head-to-head goal difference: Córdoba +1, Sporting Gijón 0, Ceuta –1.)
10	Sporting Gijón	42	18	7	17	60	54	+6	61
11	Ceuta	42	17	10	15	51	63	−12	61
12	Albacete	42	16	11	15	56	55	+1	59
13	Andorra	42	16	10	16	62	54	+8	58

Updated to match(es) played on 31 May 2026. Source: LaLiga Hypermotion
Rules for classification: 1) Points; 2) Head-to-head points; 3) Head-to-head goal difference; 4) Goal difference; 5) Goals scored; 6) Fair-play points
(Note: Head-to-head record is used only after all the matches between the teams in question have been played)

==== Results summary ====
Overall								Home						Away					
Pld	W	D	L	GF	GA	GD	Pts	W	D	L	GF	GA	GD	W	D	L	GF	GA	GD
6	2	1	3	7	12	−5	7	2	0	1	3	2	+1	0	1	2	4	10	−6

Last updated: 21 September 2025.

==== Results by round ====
Round	1	2	3	4	5	6
Ground	A	H	A	H	A	H
Result	L	L	L	W	D	W
Position	21	20	22			

Updated to match(es) played on 21 September 2025. Source:
A = Away; H = Home; W = Win; D = Draw; L = Loss

==== Matches ====
15 August 2025 1	Valladolid	3–0	Ceuta	Valladolid
21:30 UTC+2	Chuki 23', (yellow card) 60'; Biuk (yellow card) 26'; Meseguer (yellow card) 37'; Ndiaye 45+3', 55'	Report	Zalazar (yellow card) 26'; Almenara (yellow card) 84'	Stadium: José Zorrilla Stadium; Attendance: 14,584; Referee: Sergiu Mureșan Mureșan

23 August 2025 2	Ceuta	0–1	Sporting Gijón	Ceuta
19:00 UTC+2		Report	Gelabert 4'	Stadium: Estadio Alfonso Murube; Attendance: 4,473; Referee: Andrés Fuentes Molina

30 August 2025 3	Racing Santander	4–1	Ceuta	Santander
17:00	Villalibre 8'; Vicente 24', 55'; Arévalo 81'	Report	Matos (yellow card) 21'; Díez 30' (pen.); Anuar (red card) 45+5'	Stadium: Campos de Sport de El Sardinero; Attendance: 20,789; Referee: Luis Bestard Severa

7 September 2025 4	Ceuta	2–1	Huesca	Ceuta
14:00	Kone 11'; Obeng 88'; Matos (yellow card) 90+7'		Pérez (yellow card) 13'; Pulido (yellow card) 45+1'; Enrich (red card) 51'; Rodríguez 85'; Alonso (yellow card) 90+8'	Stadium: Estadio Alfonso Murube; Attendance: 5,043; Referee: Rafael Sánchez López

14 September 2025 5	Castellón	3–3	Ceuta	Castellón de la Plana
18:30 UTC+2	Brignani (yellow card) 14'; Sienra 16'; Calatrava 32'; Santiago (yellow card) 39'; Suero 90+5' (pen.); Doué (yellow card) 90+8'	Report	Fernández 3', 59', (yellow card) 83'; Caparrós (yellow card) 35'; Cantero (yellow card) 45' (yellow-red card) 69'; Matos 47'; Obeng (yellow card) 90+3'	Stadium: Nou Estadi Castàlia; Attendance: 11,801; Referee: Álvaro Moreno Aragón

21 September 2025 6	Ceuta	1–0	Zaragoza	Ceuta
14:00	Fernández (yellow card) 6', (goal) 67'; Zalazar (yellow card) 23'; Hernández (yellow card) 29'; Lachhab (yellow card) 36'; Kone (yellow card) 49'		Sebastián (yellow card) 12'; De la Fuente (yellow card) 37'	Stadium: Estadio Alfonso Murube; Referee: Alejandro Ojaos Valera
