= Club Sporting de Ceuta =

Spanish football club

Sporting Ceuta
- Full name: Club Sporting de Ceuta
- Ground: José Benoliel
- Capacity: 1,000
- President: Fuad Harrus
- Manager: Juanjo Conde
- League: Regional Preferente
- 2025–26: Regional Preferente, 3rd of 7
Home colours	Away colours

Club Sporting de Ceuta is a football club based in the Spanish enclave of Ceuta, in North Africa.

== History ==
Sporting de Ceuta started playing in the Primera Regional de Ceuta in 1973, but only remained two seasons active. The club would only return to an active status in 2003, winning the Regional Preferente but missing out promotion to CF Rusadir.

After ceasing activities in 2006, Sporting de Ceuta only had a senior side in the 2012–13 season (where they won the league but were unable to achieve promotion as AD Ceuta FC was already in the category), and between 2016 and 2019. The club also appeared in the 2021–22 campaign before spending another three years without a senior side.

Back to action in 2024–25, Sporting de Ceuta won the Preferente; with AD Ceuta FC B already in Tercera Federación, they were unable to promote, but qualified to the preliminary rounds of the 2025–26 Copa del Rey.

== Season to season ==
Season	Tier	Division	Place	Copa del Rey
1973–74	4	1ª Reg.	10th	
1974–75	4	Reg. Pref.	6th	
1975–2003	DNP			
2003–04	5	Reg. Pref.	1st	
2004–05	5	Reg. Pref.	4th	
2005–06	5	Reg. Pref.	10th	
2006–2012	DNP			
2012–13	5	Reg. Pref.	1st	
2013–14	DNP			
2014–15	DNP			
2015–16	DNP			
2016–17	5	Reg. Pref.	2nd	
2017–18	5	Reg. Pref.	2nd	
2018–19	5	Reg. Pref.	5th	
2019–20	DNP			
2020–21	DNP			
2021–22	6	Reg. Pref.	4th	
2022–23	DNP			
2023–24	DNP			
2024–25	6	Reg. Pref.	1st	

Season	Tier	Division	Place	Copa del Rey
2025–26	6	Reg. Pref.	3rd	Preliminary
2026–27	6	Reg. Pref.		
