= 2024–25 AD Ceuta FC season =

AD Ceuta FC
2024–25 season
- Manager: José Juan Romero
- Stadium: Estadio Alfonso Murube
- Primera Federación Group 2: 1st (promoted)
- Championship final: Winners
- Copa del Rey: Second round
- Top goalscorer: League: Dani Aquino (8); All: Dani Aquino (10)
- Biggest win: Ceuta 5–1 Betis Deportivo
- Biggest defeat: Ibiza 5–0 Ceuta

The 2024–25 season was the 69th in the history of AD Ceuta FC and their third consecutive season in the third-tier Primera Federación.

On 11 May, Ceuta secured promotion to the Segunda División for the first time in 57 years, following a victory over Fuenlabrada.

== Transfers ==
=== In ===
| Position | Player | From | Fee | Date | Ref |
|---|---|---|---|---|---|
| FW | (Spain) Dani Aquino | (Spain) San Fernando | Free | 1 July 2024 | |

== Friendlies ==
| 31 July 2024 Friendly | Cádiz CF Mirandilla | 0–3 | Ceuta | Cádiz |
| 19:00 | | | | Stadium: Ciudad Deportiva Bahía de Cádiz |

| 6 August 2024 Friendly | Ceuta | 1–0 | Betis Deportivo | Jerez |
| 19:00 | Andy Escudero 39' | | | Stadium: Barceló Montecastillo |

| 10 August 2024 Friendly | Ceuta | 2–0 | San Fernando | Jerez |
| 10:00 | Sofiane 32'; Lolo González 76' | Report | | Stadium: Barceló Montecastillo |
Note: Behind closed doors

| 17 August 2024 Trofeo Virgen de la Palma | Algeciras | 1–0 | Ceuta | Algeciras |
| 19:00 | Rodrigo Escudero | | | Stadium: Estadio Nuevo Mirador |

== Competitions ==
=== Overall record ===
| Competition | First match | Last match | Starting round | Final position | Record | | | | | | | |
| Competition | First match | Last match | Starting round | Final position | Pld | W | D | L | GF | GA | GD | Win % |
|---|---|---|---|---|---|---|---|---|---|---|---|---|
| Primera Federación | 24 August 2024 | 24 May 2025 | Matchday 1 | 1st | 38 | 17 | 16 | 5 | 46 | 35 | +11 | 44.74 |
| Championship final | 28 May 2025 | 31 May 2025 | First leg | Winners | 2 | 1 | 1 | 0 | 6 | 5 | +1 | 50.00 |
| Copa del Rey | 6 November 2024 | 5 December 2024 | First round | Second round | 2 | 1 | 0 | 1 | 3 | 3 | +0 | 50.00 |
| Total | | | | | 42 | 19 | 17 | 6 | 55 | 43 | +12 | 45.24 |

Source: Competitions

=== League table ===
| Pos | Team | Pld | W | D | L | GF | GA | GD | Pts | Qualification |
|---|---|---|---|---|---|---|---|---|---|---|
| 1 | Ceuta (C, P) | 38 | 17 | 16 | 5 | 46 | 35 | +11 | 67 | Promotion to Segunda División and qualification for the Copa del Rey |
| 2 | Murcia | 38 | 18 | 10 | 10 | 47 | 31 | +16 | 64 | Qualification for the promotion play-offs and Copa del Rey |
| 3 | Ibiza | 38 | 18 | 9 | 11 | 51 | 33 | +18 | 63 | Qualification for the promotion play-offs and Copa del Rey |
| 4 | Mérida | 38 | 15 | 13 | 10 | 52 | 52 | 0 | 58 (Note: Mérida finished ahead of Antequera on head-to-head points: Antequera 1–1 Mérida, Mérida 3–0 Antequera) | Qualification for the promotion play-offs and Copa del Rey |
| 5 | Antequera | 38 | 14 | 16 | 8 | 54 | 49 | +5 | 58 | Qualification for the promotion play-offs and Copa del Rey |

Rules for classification: 1) points; 2) head-to-head points; 3) head-to-head goal difference; 4) goal difference; 5) number of goals scored
(Note: Head-to-head record is used only after all the matches between the teams in question have been played)
(C) Champions; (P) Promoted

==== Results summary ====
| Overall | | | | | | | | Home | | | | | | Away | | | | | |
| Pld | W | D | L | GF | GA | GD | Pts | W | D | L | GF | GA | GD | W | D | L | GF | GA | GD |
|---|---|---|---|---|---|---|---|---|---|---|---|---|---|---|---|---|---|---|---|
| 38 | 17 | 16 | 5 | 46 | 35 | +11 | 67 | 12 | 5 | 2 | 32 | 17 | +15 | 5 | 11 | 3 | 14 | 18 | −4 |

Source: Worldfootball

==== Results by round ====
| Round | 1 | 2 | 3 | 4 | 5 | 6 | 7 | 8 | 9 | 10 | 11 | 12 | 13 | 14 | 15 | 16 | 17 | 18 | 19 | 20 | 21 | 22 | 23 | 24 | 25 | 26 | 27 | 28 | 29 | 30 | 31 | 32 | 33 | 34 | 35 | 36 | 37 | 38 |
|---|---|---|---|---|---|---|---|---|---|---|---|---|---|---|---|---|---|---|---|---|---|---|---|---|---|---|---|---|---|---|---|---|---|---|---|---|---|---|
| Ground | A | H | A | H | A | H | A | H | A | A | H | A | H | A | H | H | A | H | A | H | A | H | H | A | H | A | H | A | H | A | H | A | H | A | H | A | H | A |
| Result | L | W | W | D | D | W | D | L | L | D | W | D | L | D | D | W | D | W | D | W | D | W | W | D | W | W | D | D | D | W | W | D | W | W | W | W | D | L |
| Position | 19 | 9 | 5 | 4 | 7 | 3 | 3 | 8 | 10 | 11 | 8 | 6 | 10 | 10 | 11 | 6 | 8 | 5 | 6 | 3 | 4 | 3 | 3 | 4 | 4 | 2 | 2 | 3 | 2 | 1 | 1 | 1 | 1 | 1 | 1 | 1 | 1 | 1 |

Source: Worldfootball
A = Away; H = Home; W = Win; D = Draw; L = Loss

==== Matches ====
| 24 August 2024 1 | Hércules | 2–0 | Ceuta | Alicante |
| 20:00 | | | | Stadium: Estadio José Rico Pérez |

| 31 August 2024 2 | Ceuta | 1–0 | Fuenlabrada | Ceuta |
| 19:00 | | | | Stadium: Estadio Alfonso Murube |

| 8 September 2024 3 | Marbella | 0–1 | Ceuta | Marbella |
| 12:00 | | | | Stadium: Banús Football Center |

| 15 September 2024 4 | Ceuta | 2–2 | Sanluqueño | Ceuta |
| 15:30 | | | | Stadium: Estadio Alfonso Murube |

| 22 September 2024 5 | Betis Deportivo | 0–0 | Ceuta | Seville |
| 12:00 | | | | Stadium: Ciudad Deportiva Luis de Sol |

| 28 September 2024 6 | Ceuta | 1–0 | Recreativo Huelva | Ceuta |
| 19:30 | | | | Stadium: Estadio Alfonso Murube |

| 6 October 2024 7 | Atlético Madrid B | 1–1 | Ceuta | Majadahonda |
| 12:00 | | | | Stadium: Estadio Cerro del Espino |

| 13 October 2024 8 | Ceuta | 0–2 | Intercity | Ceuta |
| 12:00 | | | | Stadium: Estadio Alfonso Murube |

| 19 October 2024 9 | Algeciras | 2–0 | Ceuta | Algeciras |
| 19:30 | | | | Stadium: Estadio Nuevo Mirador |

| 26 October 2024 10 | Sevilla Atlético | 0–0 | Ceuta |

| 3 November 2024 11 | Ceuta | 4–2 | Real Murcia |

| 10 November 2024 12 | Mérida | 1–1 | Ceuta |

| 17 November 2024 13 | Ceuta | 0–2 | Alcorcón |

| 24 November 2024 14 | Alcoyano | 1–1 | Ceuta |

| 1 December 2024 15 | Ceuta | 1–1 | Villarreal B |

| 8 December 2024 16 | Ceuta | 3–1 | Ibiza |

| 13 December 2024 17 | Antequera | 2–2 | Ceuta |

| 22 December 2024 18 | Ceuta | 2–1 | Real Madrid Castilla |

| 12 January 2025 19 | Yeclano | 0–0 | Ceuta |

| 18 January 2025 20 | Ceuta | 1–0 | Sevilla Atlético |

| 25 January 2025 21 | Recreativo Huelva | 1–1 | Ceuta |

| 2 February 2025 22 | Ceuta | 2–1 | Atlético Madrid B |

| 9 February 2025 23 | Ceuta | 2–0 | Algeciras |

| 14 February 2025 24 | Alcorcón | 0–0 | Ceuta |

| 22 February 2025 25 | Ceuta | 5–1 | Betis Deportivo |

| 2 March 2025 26 | Villarreal B | 0–1 | Ceuta |

| 9 March 2025 27 | Ceuta | 2–2 | Antequera |

| 16 March 2025 28 | Sanluqueño | 0–0 | Ceuta |

| 22 March 2025 29 | Ceuta | 1–1 | Hércules |

| 28 March 2025 30 | Intercity | 1–2 | Ceuta |

| 6 April 2025 31 | Ceuta | 1–0 | Alcoyano |

| 12 April 2025 32 | Real Murcia | 1–1 | Ceuta |

| 19 April 2025 33 | Ceuta | 3–1 | Marbella |

| 27 April 2025 34 | Real Madrid Castilla | 0–1 | Ceuta |

| 3 May 2025 35 | Ceuta | 1–0 | Mérida |

| 11 May 2025 36 | Fuenlabrada | 1–2 | Ceuta |

| 17 May 2025 38 | Ceuta | 0–0 | Yeclano |

| 24 May 2025 38 | Ibiza | 5–0 | Ceuta |

==== Championship final ====
| 28 May 2025 First leg | Cultural Leonesa | 2–2 | Ceuta |

| 31 May 2025 Second leg | Ceuta | 4–3 (6–5 agg.) | Cultural Leonesa |

=== Copa del Rey ===
| 6 November 2024 First round | Xerez | 0–1 | Ceuta | Jerez |
| 19:00 | Geovanni Barba (red card) 90' | | Dani Aquino 7' | Stadium: Estadio Municipal de Chapín; Referee: Daniel Miranda Bolaño |

| 5 December 2024 Second round | Ceuta | 2–3 | Osasuna | Ceuta |
| 19:00 | Redru 41'; Jamelli 69' | | Ante Budimir Budimir 84'; Raúl García 87'; Redru 90+3' (o.g.) | Stadium: Estadio Alfonso Murube; Referee: Alejandro Quintero González |
