= Gabriel Okoro =

Nigerian footballer (born 1998)

Personal information
- Full name: Chidiebere Gabriel Okoro
- Date of birth: 26 December 2006 (age 19)
- Place of birth: Nigeria
- Position: Midfielder

Team information
- Current team: Ceuta
- Number: 32

Senior career*
Years	Team	Apps	(Gls)
2025–	Ceuta B	27	(1)
2026–	Ceuta	7	(0)
- * Club domestic league appearances and goals as of 27 September 2026

Chidiebere Gabriel Okoro (born 26 December 2006) is a Nigerian professional footballer who plays as a midfielder for Spanish club AD Ceuta FC.

== Career ==
On 22 October 2025, Okoro joined AD Ceuta FC on a two-year contract, being initially assigned to the reserves in Tercera Federación. He quickly became a regular starter for the side, and spent the 2026 pre-season with the first team, impressing in a match against Málaga CF.

Okoro made his professional debut with the Caballas on 15 August 2026, coming on as a late substitute for Cedric Teguia in a 5–1 away loss to FC Andorra. On 19 September, eight days after his first professional start, he renewed his contract with the club until 2029.
