= Munir Mohamedi =

Moroccan Footballer (born 1989)

Munir
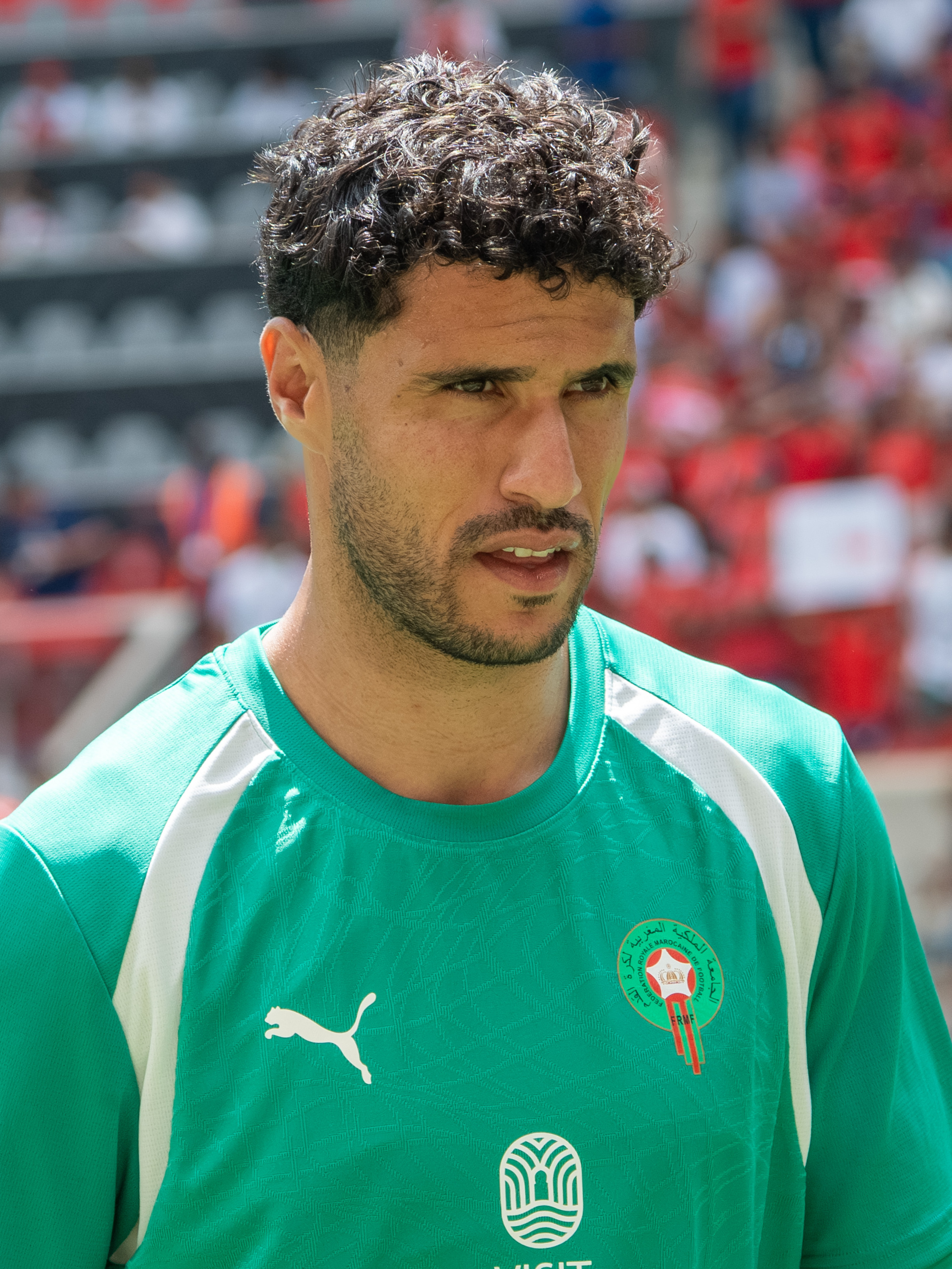
- Munir with Morocco in 2026

Personal information
- Full name: Munir El Kajoui
- Birth name: Munir Mohand Mohamedi (Note: In this Spanish name, the first or paternal surname is Mohand and the second or maternal family name is Mohamedi.)
- Date of birth: 10 May 1989 (age 37)
- Place of birth: Melilla, Spain
- Height: 1.90 m (6 ft 3 in)
- Position: Goalkeeper

Team information
- Current team: RS Berkane
- Number: 1

Youth career
- 2004–2008: Goyu-Ryu
- 2008: Ceuta

Senior career*
Years	Team	Apps	(Gls)
2008–2009	Ceuta B		
2009	Almería B	4	(0)
2009–2010	Melilla B		
2010–2014	Melilla	74	(0)
2014–2018	Numancia	74	(0)
2018–2020	Málaga	76	(0)
2020–2022	Hatayspor	71	(0)
2022–2024	Al Wehda	49	(0)
2024–	RS Berkane	32	(0)

International career^{‡}
2015–	Morocco	52	(0)
2024	Morocco Olympic	6	(0)
Medal record
Men's football
Representing Morocco
Africa Cup of Nations
Winner	2025 Morocco
Olympic Games
Bronze medal – third place	2024 Paris	Team
- * Club domestic league appearances and goals as of 21:41, 26 May 2026 (UTC) ‡ National team caps and goals as of 23:24, 1 June 2026 (UTC)

Munir El Kajoui (Note: Arabic: منير الكجوي, romanized: Munīr al-Kajwī) (né Mohand Mohamedi; born 10 May 1989), known as Munir, is a professional footballer who plays as a goalkeeper for Botola Pro club RS Berkane, which he captains, and the Morocco national team.

In his career, he played for Ceuta B, Almería B, Melilla, Numancia, Málaga, Hatayspor, Al Wehda and RS Berkane. With the last of those clubs, he won the 2024–25 Botola Pro and the 2024–25 CAF Confederation Cup.

Born in Spain, Munir represented Morocco at international level, making his debut in 2015 and being part of the squads at three World Cups and five Africa Cup of Nations, winning the 2025 edition of the latter tournament. He also won a bronze medal at the Olympic Games in 2024.

== Club career ==
Born in Melilla, Munir played youth football with CG Goyu-Ryu and AD Ceuta, and made his debut as a senior with the latter's reserves in the regional leagues. On 29 January 2009 he moved to another reserve team, UD Almería B from Tercera División, but appeared sparingly and was subsequently released.

Munir joined UD Melilla in summer 2009, initially being assigned to the reserves and being definitely promoted to the main squad in the Segunda División B the following year. He acted mainly as a backup to Pedro Dorronsoro in his first two seasons at the club, becoming a starter afterwards.

On 17 June 2014, Munir signed a two-year contract with Segunda División side CD Numancia. On 10 September he made his professional debut, starting in a 1–1 away draw against CD Leganés in the second round of the Copa del Rey and also saving two penalties during the shootout.

Munir made his debut in the second tier on 19 October 2014, playing the full 90 minutes in a 2–0 loss at UD Las Palmas. He was first choice for the remainder of the campaign, overtaking Biel Ribas.

Munir left the Soria team at the end of 2017–18, after losing his starting spot to Aitor Fernández. On 19 July 2018, he joined Málaga CF also in the second division.

From 2020 to 2022, Munir competed in the Turkish Süper Lig with Hatayspor. On 10 June 2022, he agreed to a two-year deal at Saudi Arabian club Al Wehda FC.

On 2 July 2024, RS Berkane announced the signing of Munir on a two-year contract. In his debut season, he played a massive role in securing their first-ever Botola Pro title, also being essential as the club claimed its third CAF Confederation Cup, defeating Tanzania's Simba S.C. 3–1 on aggregate to achieve a historic double; he was nominated for the African Goalkeeper of the Year Award in 2024 and 2025.

Munir became team captain in August 2025, following the departure of longtime incumbent Issoufou Dayo. One year later, he renewed his link for a further two years.

== International career ==
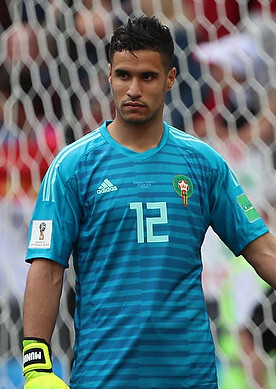
Munir at the 2018 FIFA World Cup with Morocco

Having Moroccan-Riffian heritage, Munir switched his allegiance to its national team in 2014. On 9 March 2015, he was called up by manager Ezzaki Badou for a friendly against Uruguay to be held late in the month, and made his debut by starting in the 1–0 loss.

On 29 December 2016, Munir was included in Hervé Renard's 23-man squad for the 2017 Africa Cup of Nations, and started the whole tournament ahead of Yassine Bounou. He was also selected to the 2018 FIFA World Cup in Russia, making his first appearance in the World Cup on 15 June in the 1–0 group stage defeat to Iran.

Munir was also selected for the 2019 and 2021 Africa Cup of Nations and the 2022 World Cup. After starter Bounou fell ill shortly before the start of the group-stage fixture against Belgium in the latter tournament, he replaced him and eventually contributed to a 2–0 win in Doha; he and his teammates made history and became the first African nation ever to reach the semi-finals of the competition.

Munir was amongst the 27 players picked by coach Walid Regragui for the 2023 Africa Cup of Nations. He also made the squad for the 2024 Summer Olympics in Paris as an overage player, playing all the minutes and winning the bronze medal.

In October 2025, Munir's Morocco broke the world record for the longest winning streak in international football, surpassing Spain's previous mark of 15 consecutive victories; with a 1–0 win over Congo in Rabat, they extended their unbeaten run to 16 in all competitions, including World Cup qualifiers and friendlies. In December, he was selected for the 2025 Africa Cup of Nations to be held on home soil.

Munir was selected for the 2026 World Cup.

== Career statistics ==
=== Club ===
As of match played 25 May 2025

Appearances and goals by club, season and competition
Club	Season	League			National cup (Note: Includes Turkish Cup, King's Cup, Throne Cup)		Continental		Other		Total	
Club	Season	Division	Apps	Goals	Apps	Goals	Apps	Goals	Apps	Goals	Apps	Goals
Hatayspor	2020–21	Süper Lig	37	0	0	0	–		–		37	0
Hatayspor	2021–22	Süper Lig	34	0	1	0	–		–		35	0
Hatayspor	Total		71	0	1	0	–		–		72	0
Al Wehda	2022–23	Saudi Pro League	22	0	3	0	–		–		25	0
Al Wehda	2023–24	Saudi Pro League	27	0	2	0	–		1 (Note: Appearance in Saudi Super Cup)	0	30	0
Al Wehda	Total		49	0	5	0	–		1	0	55	0
RS Berkane	2024–25	Botola	27	0	2	0	13 (Note: Appearances in CAF Confederation Cup)	0	–		42	0
Career total			147	0	8	0	13	0	1	0	169	0

=== International ===
Appearances and goals by national team and year
National team	Year	Apps	Goals
Morocco	2015	6	0
Morocco	2016	6	0
Morocco	2017	12	0
Morocco	2018	9	0
Morocco	2019	5	0
Morocco	2020	1	0
Morocco	2021	2	0
Morocco	2022	3	0
Morocco	2023	2	0
Morocco	2024	3	0
Morocco	2025	1	0
Morocco	2026	2	0
Total		52	0

== Honours ==
Al Wehda

- King's Cup runner-up: 2022–23

RS Berkane

- Botola Pro: 2024–25
- CAF Confederation Cup: 2024–25
- Moroccan Throne Cup runner-up: 2024–25
- CAF Super Cup runner-up: 2025

Morocco Olympic

- Olympic Bronze Medal: 2024

Morocco

- Africa Cup of Nations: 2025

Individual

- Ricardo Zamora Trophy: 2019–20 Segunda División
- Segunda División Player of the Month: September 2018
- Botola Pro Best Goalkeeper: 2024–25
- Botola Pro Team of the Season: 2024–25
- CAF Confederation Cup Group Stage Best XI: 2024–25
- UMFP Best Moroccan Goalkeeper: 2024–25

Orders

- Order of the Throne: 2022
