= River Melilla CF =

Association football club in Spain

River Melilla
- Full name: River Melilla Club de Fútbol
- Founded: 2013
- Ground: La Espiguera, Melilla, Spain
- Capacity: 2,000
- President: Saladín Mohamed Hamed
- 2023–24: Primera Autonómica de Melilla, 1st of 6 (champions)
Home colours	Away colours

River Melilla Club de Fútbol is a Spanish football club based in the autonomous city of Melilla. Founded in 2013, they hold home games at Estadio La Espiguera, which has a capacity of 2,000 spectators.

== History ==
River Melilla was founded in 2013, and started a senior team in the following season, winning the Primera Autonómica and achieving promotion to Tercera División. In June 2016, the club reached an agreement with UD Melilla to become their reserve team.

In 2018, after winning the Primera Autonómica and returning to the fourth division at first attempt, River's agreement with Melilla ended, and the club refounded UD Melilla B. River was immediately relegated back after a 2018–19 season with just four points.

In August 2024, after winning the Primera Autonómica, River did not register for the 2024–25 Tercera Federación after not receiving subsidy from the City Council, and their spot was taken by FC Málaga City late in that month, after Melilla CD also refused to play in the division.

== Season to season ==
Season	Tier	Division	Place	Copa del Rey
2014–15	5	1ª Aut.	1st	
2014–15	4	3ª	17th	
2016–17	4	3ª	17th	N/A (Note: Reserve team of UD Melilla.)
2017–18	5	1ª Aut.	1st	N/A
2018–19	4	3ª	22nd	
2019–20	DNP			
2020–21	DNP			
2021–22	6	1ª Aut.	3rd	
2022–23	6	1ª Aut.	5th	
2023–24	6	1ª Aut.	1st	

- 3 seasons in Tercera División
