= Arick Betancourt =

Spanish footballer

Personal information
- Full name: Arick Alejandro Betancourt Pérez
- Date of birth: 31 May 2004 (age 22)
- Place of birth: Caracas, Venezuela
- Height: 1.78 m (5 ft 10 in)
- Position: Midfielder

Team information
- Current team: Ceuta
- Number: 34

Youth career
- Inter San José
- 2018–2019: Manises
- 2019–2020: Patacona
- 2020–2021: Paterna
- 2021: Gandía
- 2021–2022: Patacona
- 2022: Torre Levante
- 2022–2023: Alzira

Senior career*
Years	Team	Apps	(Gls)
2023	Alzira	1	(0)
2023–2024	Quintanar Rey	26	(2)
2024–2026	Ceuta B	58	(5)
2026–	Ceuta	5	(0)
- * Club domestic league appearances and goals as of 31 May 2026

Arick Alejandro Betancourt Pérez (born 31 May 2004) is a Venezuelan professional footballer who plays as a midfielder for Spanish club AD Ceuta FC.

== Career ==
Born in Caracas, Betancourt moved to Spain in 2017. He played for CF Inter San José, Manises CF, Patacona CF (two stints), Paterna CF, CF Gandía and CF Torre Levante before joining the Juvenil side of UD Alzira in 2022.

Betancourt made his senior debut with Alzira on 7 May 2023, playing the last 12 minutes in a 3–0 Segunda Federación home win over CD Ibiza Islas Pitiusas. On 17 June, he moved to Tercera Federación side CD Quintanar del Rey.

On 10 July 2024, Betancourt agreed to a deal with AD Ceuta FC, being initially assigned to the reserves also in the fifth division. He renewed his link for a further year on 19 June 2025, and made his first team debut the following 28 March, coming on as a second-half substitute for Aboubacar Bassinga in a 2–1 Segunda División home win over Cádiz CF.

On 13 July 2026, Betancourt renewed his contract with the Caballas until 2028, being definitely promoted to the first team.
