= Enrique Romero (disambiguation) =

Enrique Romero (born 1971) is a Spanish former footballer.

Enrique Romero may also refer to:

- Enrique Romero (footballer, born 1978), Spanish footballer
- Enrique Romero (swimmer) (born 1963), Mexican swimmer
- Enrique Badía Romero (1934–2024), Spanish comics artist
