= Yeyo =

Yeyo or El Yeyo may refer to:

- Yeyo, a diminutive of Aurelio in Spanish naming customs
- Yeyo, a member of The D.E.Y., a Latin hip hop group
- Aurelio Cano Flores (born 1972), Mexican drug lord nicknamed Yeyo
- Edelio López Falcón (1965–2003), Mexican drug lord nicknamed El Yeyo
- Sergio González González (born 2007), Spanish footballer
- "Yeyo", a song by The Bloody Beetroots from thec 2009 album Romborama
- Yeyo's, a fictional Madrid department store in Crimen Ferpecto
