= Josema (footballer, born 2003) =

Spanish footballer

Personal information
- Full name: José Manuel López Pérez
- Date of birth: 8 March 2003 (age 23)
- Place of birth: Las Gabias, Spain
- Height: 1.75 m (5 ft 9 in)
- Position: Midfielder

Team information
- Current team: Ceuta

Youth career
- Granada

Senior career*
Years	Team	Apps	(Gls)
2022–2023	Granada B	0	(0)
2022–2023	→ Torre del Mar (loan)	21	(0)
2023–2024	El Palo	16	(0)
2024–2025	Huétor Tájar	33	(1)
2025–2026	Ceuta B	24	(0)
2025–	Ceuta	5	(0)
- * Club domestic league appearances and goals as of 31 May 2026

José Manuel López Pérez (born 8 March 2003), commonly known as Josema, is a Spanish professional footballer who plays for AD Ceuta FC. Mainly a midfielder, he can also play as a left-back.

== Career ==
Born in Las Gabias, Granada, Andalusia, Josema finished his formation with Granada CF. Promoted to the reserves in July 2022, he was loaned to Tercera Federación side UD Torre del Mar in August.

In August 2023, Josema moved to El Palo FC in Segunda Federación. After being sparingly used, he joined CD Huétor Tájar back in the fifth division the following July, before signing a one-year deal with AD Ceuta FC's B-team on 3 July 2025.

Josema made his first team debut with the Caballas on 29 October 2025, coming on as a second-half substitute for Aboubacar Bassinga in a 2–0 away win over FC La Unión Atlético, for the season's Copa del Rey. He made his professional debut on 7 December, replacing goalscorer Cristian Rodríguez late into a 1–1 Segunda División away draw against former side Granada.
