= CD Ceuta 6 de Junio =

Football club in Spain

Ceuta 6 de Junio
- Full name: Club Deportivo Ceuta 6 de Junio
- Founded: 1969
- Ground: José Martínez Pirri, Ceuta, Spain
- Capacity: 1,500
- Manager: Yussuf Ali
- League: Regional Preferente
- 2025–26: Regional Preferente, 1st of 7 (champions)
Home colours

Club Deportivo Ceuta 6 de Junio is a Spanish football club based in the autonomous city of Ceuta. Founded in 1969, they play in Regional Preferente, holding home matches at Estadio José Martínez Pirri with a capacity of 1,500 seats.

== History ==
Founded in 1969, Ceuta 6 de Junio only started playing in a regional league in the 2020–21 season, in the Regional Preferente. After finishing second and missing out promotion to AD Ceuta FC B, the club won a spot in the 2021–22 Copa del Rey.

The club won the Preferente title in the 2021–22 campaign, but as Ceuta B were not promoted nor relegated, they were unable to promote, and once again earned a spot in the national cup. The same happened in the 2022–23 season.

== Season to season ==
Season	Tier	Division	Place	Copa del Rey
2020–21	5	Reg. Pref.	2nd	
2021–22	6	Reg. Pref.	1st	Preliminary
2022–23	6	Reg. Pref.	1st	Preliminary
2023–24	6	Reg. Pref.	1st	Preliminary
2024–25	6	Reg. Pref.	2nd	Preliminary
2025–26	6	Reg. Pref.	1st	
2026–27	6	Reg. Pref.		Preliminary
