= CD Tercio =

Spanish football team

Tercio
- Full name: Club Deportivo Tercio
- Dissolved: 2023
- Ground: La Espiguera
- Capacity: 2,000
- 2022–23: Primera Autonómica de Melilla, 4th of 6
Home colours

Club Deportivo Tercio was a military football team based in the autonomous city of Melilla.

== Season to season ==
Season	Tier	Division	Place	Copa del Rey
1999–2000	5	1ª Aut.	6th	
2000–01	5	1ª Aut.	7th	
2001–2005	DNP			
2005–06	5	1ª Aut.	6th	
2006–07	5	1ª Aut.	4th	
2007–08	5	1ª Aut.	4th	
2008–09	5	1ª Aut.	4th	
2009–10	5	1ª Aut.	5th	
2010–11	5	1ª Aut.	4th	
2011–12	5	1ª Aut.	6th	
2012–13	5	1ª Aut.	4th	
2013–14	5	1ª Aut.	7th	
2014–15	5	1ª Aut.	9th	
2015–16	5	1ª Aut.	7th	
2016–2022	DNP			
2022–23	6	1ª Aut.	4th	
