= Sofiane El Ftouhi =

French footballer (born 2001)

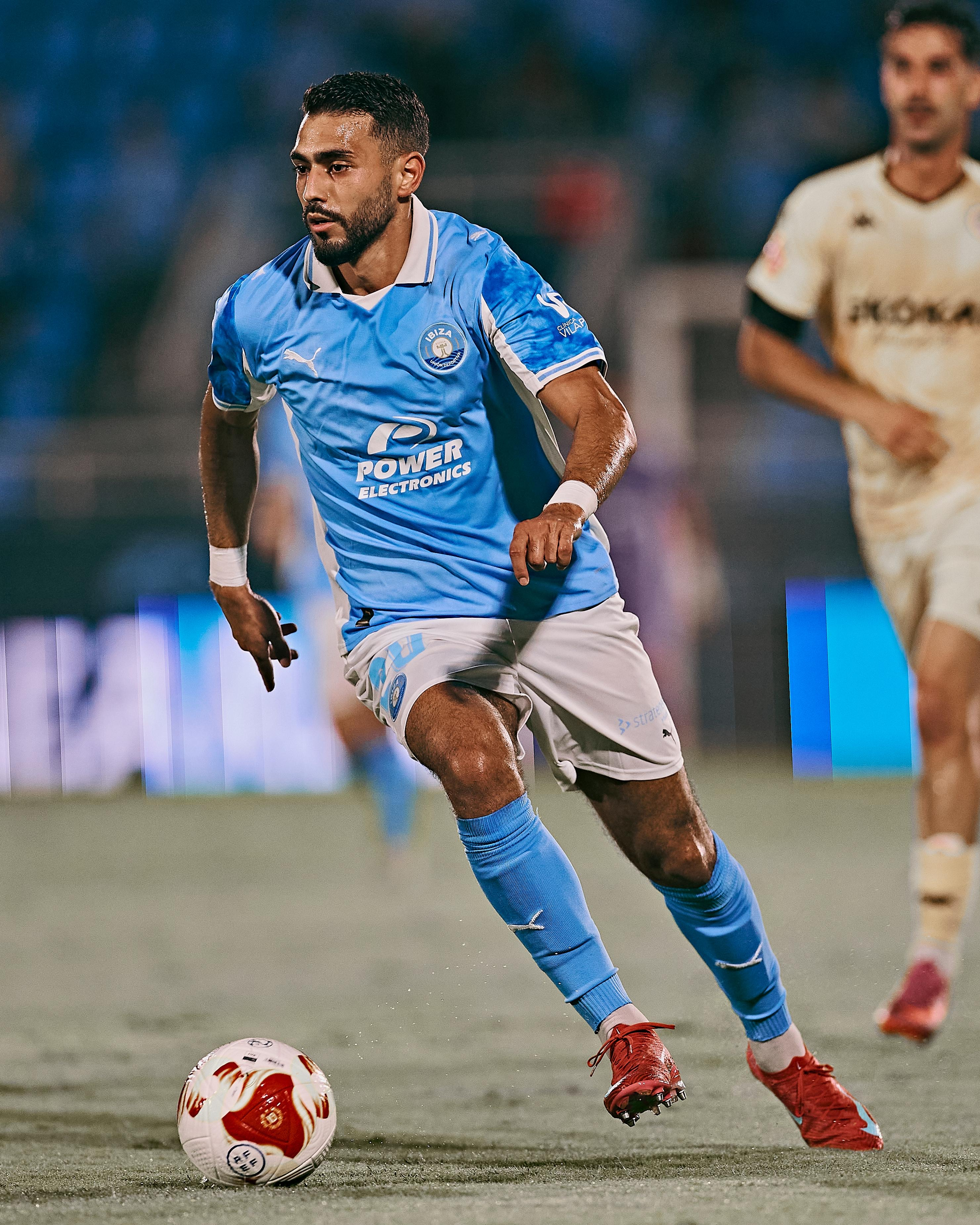

Personal information
- Date of birth: 26 January 2001 (age 25)
- Place of birth: Perpignan, France
- Height: 1.85 m (6 ft 1 in)
- Position: Forward

Team information
- Current team: Mérida
- Number: 11

Youth career
- 2016–2019: Nîmes

Senior career*
Years	Team	Apps	(Gls)
2018–2022	Nîmes II	51	(16)
2021–2022	Nîmes	1	(0)
2022–2023	Nancy II	23	(5)
2023–2024	Ceuta B	9	(4)
2024–2025	Ceuta	36	(5)
2025	→ Sanluqueño (loan)	15	(7)
2025–2026	Ibiza	17	(2)
2026–	Mérida	14	(3)
- * Club domestic league appearances and goals as of 9 June 2026

Sofiane El Ftouhi (born 26 January 2001) is a French professional footballer who plays as a forward for Spanish club Mérida.

== Club career ==
Born in Perpignan, El Ftouhi joined Nîmes Olympique in 2016, after being spotted in Canet-en-Roussillon. After playing with the reserve team, he made his first team debut on 13 November 2021, coming on as a late substitute for Niclas Eliasson in a 3–0 away win over FC Chusclan Laudun l'Ardoise, for the season's Coupe de France.

In 2022, El Ftouhi joined AS Nancy Lorraine, being a member of Nancy II in Championnat National 3. On 22 August of the following year, he moved abroad for the first time in his career, joining AD Ceuta FC's reserves in Tercera Federación, after a successful trial period.

On 23 January 2024, El Ftouhi renewed his contract with Ceuta until 2026, being definitely promoted to the main squad. On 3 February of the following year, after falling down the pecking order, he was loaned to fellow Primera Federación side Atlético Sanluqueño CF until the end of the season.

On 27 July 2025, El Ftouhi signed a three-year contract with UD Ibiza, also in the third division.

== International career ==
On 21 February 2017, El Ftouhi was called up to the France national under-16 team for to prepare for a tournament.
