= Bassinga =

Bassinga is a surname. Notable people with the surname include:

- Aboubacar Bassinga (born 2005), Burkinabe footballer
- Déo Bassinga (born 2005), Congolese footballer
