= Konrad de la Fuente =

American soccer player (born 2001)

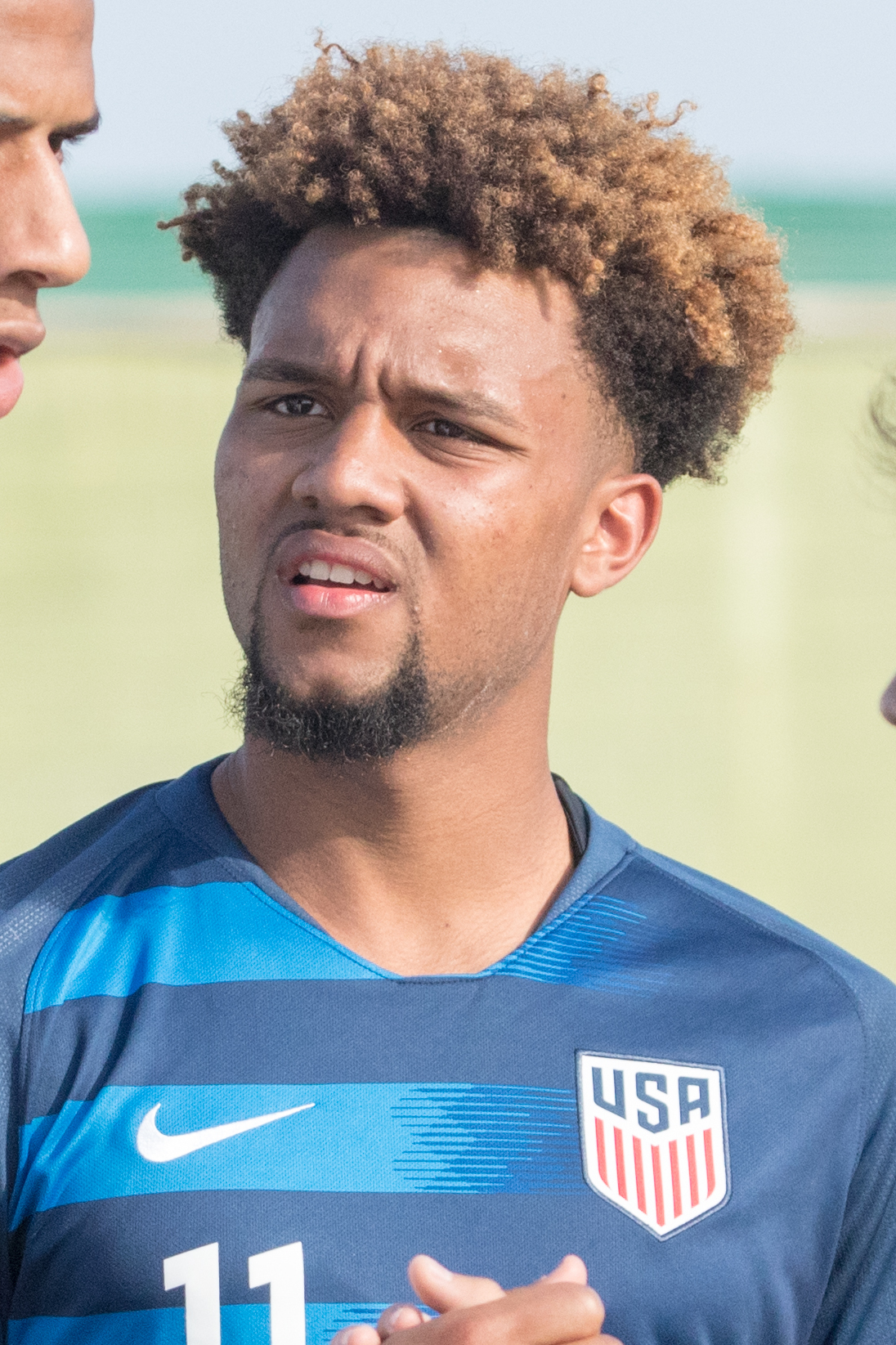
- Konrad with the United States U20 in 2019

Personal information
- Full name: Konrad de la Fuente
- Date of birth: July 16, 2001 (age 25)
- Place of birth: Miami, Florida, United States
- Height: 5 ft 7 in (1.70 m)
- Position: Winger

Team information
- Current team: Sporting Gijón
- Number: 11

Youth career
- Tecnofutbol
- 2012–2013: Damm
- 2013–2020: Barcelona

Senior career*
Years	Team	Apps	(Gls)
2018–2021	Barcelona B	25	(7)
2020–2021	Barcelona	0	(0)
2021–2024	Marseille	16	(0)
2022–2023	→ Olympiacos (loan)	3	(0)
2023–2024	→ Eibar (loan)	19	(3)
2024–2026	Lausanne-Sport	27	(0)
2025–2026	→ Ceuta (loan)	31	(3)
2026–	Sporting Gijón	3	(0)

International career^{‡}
2016–2017	United States U16	11	(4)
2017	United States U18	4	(1)
2019	United States U20	9	(1)
2020–2021	United States	3	(0)
- * Club domestic league appearances and goals as of August 30, 2026 ‡ National team caps and goals as of September 5, 2021

Konrad de la Fuente (born July 16, 2001) is an American professional soccer player who plays as a winger for Segunda División club Sporting Gijón.

== Club career ==
=== Youth ===
Born in Miami, Florida, to Haitian parents of Dominican descent, Konrad moved to Spain at the age of 10 when his father took a job at the Haitian consulate in Barcelona. While playing for local youth side CF Damm, he was discovered and offered the chance to play for FC Barcelona. He developed in Barcelona's youth system after joining in 2013.

=== Barcelona B ===
Konrad made his debut for the reserves on December 1, 2018, coming off the bench and playing 12 minutes against Valencia Mestalla in the Segunda División B. He conceded a penalty in the final minutes of the game causing his side to go 2–1 down, but teammate Ronald Araújo equalized late, ending the match 2–2.

He made his first start for the team on December 15, 2019, in a 3–1 win against La Nucía. He was replaced by Dani Morer in the 70th minute.

He scored his first goal for Barça B on February 2, 2020, a stoppage time winner in a 2–1 win against AE Prat, after coming on in the 81st minute.

=== Barcelona ===
On September 12, 2020, Konrad made his first team debut in a pre-season game against Gimnàstic Tarragona, in the process becoming the first American to play for Barcelona's first team. He made his official debut for Barcelona in the UEFA Champions League group stage match against Dynamo Kyiv on November 24, 2020, replacing Francisco Trincão in a 4–0 win. He appeared once again for Barça in the Champions League, coming off the bench again in a 3–0 away victory over Ferencváros, and later the following January in the Copa del Rey in a 2–0 away victory against Cornellà.

=== Marseille ===
On June 29, 2021, Konrad signed with Ligue 1 club Marseille, with Barcelona reserving the right to 50% of a future sale. He made his league debut on August 8 against Montpellier, recording his first assist on the first goal of a 3–2 comeback win. Konrad's season came to end in April 2022 when he suffered a knee injury that required surgery.

==== Loan to Olympiacos ====
On August 13, 2022, Konrad was loaned to Olympiacos in Greece. His debut came six days later against Apollon Limassol in the play-off round first leg of UEFA Europa League qualifying, coming off the bench in a 1–1 away draw. Konrad's loan was derailed heavily when he suffered an anterior cruciate ligament injury early on in the season.

==== Loan to Eibar ====
On August 9, 2023, Konrad returned to Spain, joining Segunda División side Eibar on a one-year loan deal with a buy option attached. He made his debut three days later in the opening matchday fixture against Racing de Santander, where he came off the bench in a 4–0 away loss. On March 30, 2024, he notched a brace in a 5–1 home win over Eldense. Eibar declined his option to buy at the end of the season.

=== Lausanne-Sport ===
On July 24, 2024, Konrad moved to Swiss Super League club Lausanne-Sport on a three-year contract. He made his debut in the opening league fixture against FC Sion, where he replaced Teddy Okou in a 4–0 away loss. His first goal for the club came on 18 August in the 7–0 away rout of FC Champel in the first round of the Swiss Cup, where he also provided two assists.

==== Loan to Ceuta ====
On September 2, 2025, Konrad returned to Spain and its second division, after agreeing to a one-year loan deal with Ceuta. He made his debut for the club the following September 28 in a 0–0 draw with Cádiz away from home. His first goal for the club arrived on October 18, in the 2–0 home victory against Mirandés in the league.

=== Sporting Gijón ===
On July 29, 2026, Konrad was announced at fellow division two side Sporting Gijón on a three-year contract.

== International career ==
Konrad has represented the United States at the under-16, under-18, and under-20 levels. In July 2019, he was called up to the under-20 team for the 2019 FIFA U-20 World Cup in Poland. He started every match in the tournament until the United States was eliminated by Ecuador in the quarterfinals.

He received his first call up to the senior national team for friendly matches against Wales and Panama in November 2020. He made his debut on November 12, 2020, in the friendly against Wales as a starter and was replaced by Ulysses Llanez in the 71st minute.

== Career statistics ==
=== Club ===
As of match played August 30, 2026

Appearances and goals by club, season and competition
Club	Season	League			National cup (Note: Includes Copa del Rey, Coupe de France, Swiss Cup)		Continental		Other		Total	
Club	Season	Division	Apps	Goals	Apps	Goals	Apps	Goals	Apps	Goals	Apps	Goals
Barcelona B	2018–19	Segunda División B	1	0	—		—		—		1	0
Barcelona B	2019–20	Segunda División B	3	1	—		—		3 (Note: Appearances(s) in Segunda División B play-offs)	2	6	3
Barcelona B	2020–21	Segunda División B	21 (Note: Includes six appearances in Segunda División B second phase)	6	—		—		1	0	22	6
Barcelona	2020–21	La Liga	—		1	0	2 (Note: Appearances in UEFA Champions League)	0	—		3	0
Barcelona	Total		25	7	1	0	2	0	4	2	32	9
Marseille	2021–22	Ligue 1	16	0	1	0	6 (Note: Four appearances in UEFA Europa League, two appearances and one goal in UEFA Europa Conference League)	1	—		23	1
Olympiacos (loan)	2022–23	Super League Greece	3	0	—		2 (Note: Appearances in UEFA Europa League qualifying)	0	—		5	0
Eibar (loan)	2023–24	Segunda División	19	3	3	1	—		2	0	24	4
Eibar (loan)	Total		38	3	4	1	8	1	2	0	52	5
Lausanne-Sport	2024–25	Swiss Super League	24	0	4	1	—		—		28	1
Lausanne-Sport	2025–26	Swiss Super League	2	0	—		1 (Note: Appearance in UEFA Conference League)	0	—		3	0
Lausanne-Sport	2026–27	Swiss Super League	1	0	—		—		—		1	0
Ceuta (loan)	2025–26	Segunda División	31	3	2	0	—		—		33	3
Ceuta (loan)	Total		58	3	6	1	1	0	—		65	4
Sporting Gijón	2026–27	Segunda División	3	0	0	0	—		—		3	0
Career total			124	13	11	2	11	1	6	2	152	18

=== International ===
As of match played September 5, 2021

Appearances and goals by national team and year
National team	Year	Apps	Goals
United States	2020	1	0
United States	2021	2	0
Total		3	0

== Honors ==
Barcelona

- Copa del Rey: 2020–21
