= Adri Rueda =

Spanish footballer

Personal information
- Full name: Adrián Rueda Colunga
- Date of birth: 12 August 2004 (age 22)
- Place of birth: Gijón, Spain
- Position: Winger

Team information
- Current team: Ceuta B
- Number: 20

Youth career
- Sporting Gijón
- 2022–2023: Gijón Industrial

Senior career*
Years	Team	Apps	(Gls)
2022–2024	Gijón Industrial	31	(3)
2024–2025	Lealtad	7	(0)
2025	→ Langreo (loan)	12	(3)
2025–	Ceuta B	26	(1)
2026–	Ceuta	1	(0)
- * Club domestic league appearances and goals as of 24 May 2026

Adrián "Adri" Rueda Colunga (born 12 August 2004) is a Spanish footballer who plays as a winger for AD Ceuta FC B.

== Career ==
Born in Gijón, Asturias, Rueda played for Sporting de Gijón as a youth before moving to UD Gijón Industrial in 2022. Initially a member of the Juvenil squad, he subsequently made his first team debut in Primera RFFPA, before being definitely promoted to the main squad in June 2023.

On 20 July 2024, Rueda signed a two-year deal with Segunda Federación side UP Langreo. Rarely used, he was loaned to CD Lealtad in Tercera Federación on 23 January 2025.

On 28 July 2025, Rueda joined AD Ceuta FC and was initially assigned to the reserves also in the fifth division. He made his first team debut the following 24 May, coming on as a late substitute for Aisar Ahmed in a 2–0 Segunda División away win over FC Andorra.
