= 2026–27 Górnik Zabrze season =

Górnik Zabrze
2026–27 season
- Manager: Michal Gašparík
- Stadium: Arena Zabrze
- Ekstraklasa: Pre-season
- Polish Cup: 5th
- Polish Super Cup: Runners-up
- UEFA Champions League: Second qualifying round
- UEFA Europa League: Third qualifying round
- UEFA Conference League: Play-off round
| Home colours | Away colours |

The 2026–27 season is the 78th year in the history of Górnik Zabrze and their tenth consecutive season in the Ekstraklasa. The club will also compete in the Polish Cup, the Polish Super Cup, and is returning to the UEFA Champions League for the first time since 1988.

== Transfers ==
=== In ===
| Pos. | Player | Transferred from | Fee | Date | Source |
|---|---|---|---|---|---|
| MF | (Poland) Wiktor Nowak | (Poland) Wisła Płock | Loan return | 30 June 2026 | |
| MF | (Croatia) Bruno Durdov | (Croatia) Hajduk Split | Undisclosed | 1 July 2026 | |
| MF | (Dominican Republic) Peter González | (Spain) Getafe | Undisclosed | 11 July 2026 | |
| MF | (United States) Maximilian Dietz | (Germany) Greuther Fürth | Undisclosed | 17 July 2026 | |

=== Out ===
| Pos. | Player | Transferred to | Fee | Date | Source |
|---|---|---|---|---|---|
| GK | (Poland) Marcel Łubik | (Germany) FC Augsburg | Loan return | 30 June 2026 | |
| MF | (Czech Republic) Patrik Hellebrand | (Poland) Korona Kielce | Undisclosed | 1 July 2026 | |
| MF | (Poland) Wiktor Nowak | (Czech Republic) Slavia Prague | Undisclosed | 1 July 2026 | |
| DF | (Poland) Paweł Olkowski | (Poland) GKS Tychy | | 1 July 2026 | |
| MF | (Germany) Lukas Podolski | Retiring | | 1 July 2026 | |
| FW | (Bulgaria) Borislav Rupanov | (Portugal) União de Leiria | | 3 July 2026 | |
| MF | (Czech Republic) Lukáš Ambros | (Belgium) Anderlecht | Undisclosed | 10 July 2026 | |

== Pre-season and friendlies ==
| 24 June 2026 Friendly | Górnik Zabrze (Poland) | 3–0 | (Poland) Puszcza Niepołomice |
| 11:00 | Ambros 14'; Durdov 16'; Kubicki 83' |

| 28 June 2026 Friendly | Hallescher FC (Germany) | 1–2 | (Poland) Górnik Zabrze |
| 14:00 | Stobbe 74' | | Prekop 53', 68' |

| 4 July 2026 Friendly | Red Bull Salzburg (Austria) | 2–1 | (Poland) Górnik Zabrze |
| 11:00 | Veratschnig 24'; Konaté 56' | | Massimo 54' |

| 4 July 2026 Friendly | WSG Tirol (Austria) | 0–0 | (Poland) Górnik Zabrze |
| 17:30 |

| 10 July 2026 Friendly | Nordsjælland (Denmark) | 0–2 | (Poland) Górnik Zabrze |
| 17:00 | | | Ismaheel 8', 45+4' |

== Competitions ==
=== Overall record ===
| Competition | First match | Last match | Starting round | Final position | Record | | | | | | | |
| Competition | First match | Last match | Starting round | Final position | Pld | W | D | L | GF | GA | GD | Win % |
|---|---|---|---|---|---|---|---|---|---|---|---|---|
| Ekstraklasa | 25 July 2026 | | Matchday 1 | | 2 | 2 | 0 | 0 | 5 | 2 | +3 | 100.00 |
| Polish Cup | | | | | 0 | 0 | 0 | 0 | 0 | 0 | +0 | — |
| Polish Super Cup | 16 July 2026 | | Final | Runners-up | 1 | 0 | 0 | 1 | 1 | 3 | −2 | 0.00 |
| UEFA Champions League | 21 July 2026 | 29 July 2026 | Second qualifying round | Second qualifying round | 2 | 0 | 1 | 1 | 1 | 2 | −1 | 0.00 |
| UEFA Europa League | 5 August 2026 | | | | 1 | 0 | 0 | 1 | 0 | 1 | −1 | 0.00 |
| Total | | | | | 6 | 2 | 1 | 3 | 7 | 8 | −1 | 33.33 |

Last updated: 8 August 2026
Source: Competitions

=== Ekstraklasa ===
| Pos | Team | Pld | W | D | L | GF | GA | GD | Pts | Qualification or relegation |
|---|---|---|---|---|---|---|---|---|---|---|
| 1 | Lech Poznań | 13 | 10 | 2 | 1 | 34 | 13 | +21 | 32 | Qualification for the Champions League play-off round |
| 2 | Górnik Zabrze | 14 | 9 | 4 | 1 | 23 | 12 | +11 | 31 | Qualification for the Champions League second qualifying round |
| 3 | Legia Warsaw | 14 | 6 | 6 | 2 | 25 | 15 | +10 | 24 | Qualification for the Europa League second qualifying round |
| 4 | Pogoń Szczecin | 13 | 7 | 3 | 3 | 20 | 15 | +5 | 24 | Qualification for the Conference League second qualifying round |
| 5 | Wisła Kraków | 14 | 7 | 3 | 4 | 22 | 19 | +3 | 24 | |

Updated to match(es) played on 8 November 2026. Source: ekstraklasa.org 90minut.pl
Rules for classification: 1) Points; 2) Head-to-head points; 3) Head-to-head goal difference; 4) Goal difference; 5) Goals scored; 6) Number of wins; 7) Number of away wins; 8) Lower number of points based on yellow and red cards (red card = 3 points, yellow card = 1 point, sending-off = 3 points - including 1 point for first yellow card); 9) Fairplay ranking; 10) Draw.
(Note: Head-to-head record is used only after all the matches between the teams in question have been played)

==== Matches ====
| 25 July 2026 1 | Górnik Zabrze | 2–1 | Śląsk Wrocław | Zabrze |
| 17:30 | Matsenko 65' (o.g.); Ikia Dimi 79' | | Banaszak 7' |

=== Polish Super Cup ===
| 16 July 2026 Final | Lech Poznań | 3–1 | Górnik Zabrze | Poznań |
| 19:00 | Kozubal 27', (yellow card) 71'; Ishak 47'; Rodríguez 69'; Thórdarson (yellow card) 76' | | Khlan 14'; Donio (yellow card) 45'; Sáček (yellow card) 89' | Stadium: Poznań Stadium |

=== UEFA Champions League ===
==== Second qualifying round ====
| 21 July 2026 First leg | Fenerbahçe (Turkey) | 1–0 | (Poland) Górnik Zabrze | Istanbul, Turkey |
| 21:00 UTC+3 | Talisca 37' | | | Stadium: Şükrü Saracoğlu Stadium; Referee: Manfredas Lukjančukas (Lithuania) |

| 29 July 2026 Second leg | Górnik Zabrze (Poland) | 1–1 (1–2 agg.) | (Turkey) Fenerbahçe | Zabrze |
| 20:00 UTC+2 | Sadílek (yellow card) 11'; Janža (yellow card) 28'; Sáček 45+10'; Janicki (yellow card) 66'; Josema (yellow card) 70' | | Talisca 12' (pen.); Oosterwolde (yellow card) 41'; Semedo (yellow card) 86'; Greenwood (yellow card) 90'; Fred (yellow card) 90+2'; Guendouzi (yellow card) 90+3' | Stadium: Arena Zabrze; Referee: Lothar D'hondt (Belgium) |

Fenerbahçe won 2–1 on aggregate.

=== UEFA Europa League ===
==== Third qualifying round ====
| 5 August 2026 First leg | Ferencváros (Hungary) | 1–0 | (Poland) Górnik Zabrze | Budapest, Hungary |
| 20:15 | Corbu 65' | | Josema (yellow card) 10' | Stadium: Ferencváros Stadion |

| 13 August 2026 Second leg | Górnik Zabrze (Poland) | 1–1 (1–2 agg.) | (Hungary) Ferencváros | Zabrze |
| 19:00 | Urbański 45' (pen.) | Report | Osváth (yellow card) 26'; Rommens (yellow card) 44'; Sáček 82' (o.g.) | Stadium: Arena Zabrze; Attendance: 23,348; Referee: Andrea Colombo (Italy) |

Ferencváros won 2–1 on aggregate.

=== UEFA Conference League ===
==== Play-off round ====
| 20 August 2026 First leg | Górnik Zabrze (Poland) | 2–3 | (France) Monaco | Zabrze |
| 20:00 | Prekop 53'; Dietz (yellow card) 70'; Liseth 74'; Janža (yellow card) 90+4' | Report | Biereth 9'; Detourbet (yellow card) 38'; Camara 51'; Brunner 58'; Soubeir (yellow card) 61' | Stadium: Arena Zabrze; Referee: Martin Matoša (Slovenia) |

| 27 August 2026 Second leg | Monaco (France) | 4–1 (7–3 agg.) | (Poland) Górnik Zabrze | Fontvieille, Monaco |
| 18:45 | Brunner 30'; Coulibaly 43'; Golovin 50'; Biereth 58' | Report | Dietz (yellow card) 33'; Khlan (yellow card) 52'; Antiste 83' | Stadium: Stade Louis II, Monaco; Referee: Vasilios Fotias |

Monaco won 7–3 on aggregate.
