= Casino del Real CF =

Spanish football club

Casino del Real
- Full name: Casino del Real Club de Fútbol
- Founded: 2003
- Dissolved: 2013
- Ground: La Espiguera; Melilla, Spain
- Capacity: 2,000
- Chairman: (Spain) Juan José Pedreño
- Manager: (Spain) Fernando Aznar "Bolli"
- League: 3ª – Group 9
- 2012–13: 3ª – Group 9, 11th
| Home colours | Away colours |

Casino del Real Club de Fútbol was a football team based in Melilla. Founded in 2003, the team played in Tercera División – Group 9. The club's home ground was Estadio La Espiguera.

In 2012, Casino del Real became the reserve team of UD Melilla. One year later, the team changed its name to UD Melilla B, and abandoned their former status.

== Season to season ==
| Season | Tier | Division | Place | Copa del Rey |
|---|---|---|---|---|
| 2006–07 | 5 | 1ª Aut. | 2nd | |
| 2007–08 | 5 | 1ª Aut. | 1st | |
| 2008–09 | 4 | 3ª | 20th | |
| 2009–10 | 5 | 1ª Aut. | 1st | |
| 2010–11 | 4 | 3ª | 17th | |
| 2011–12 | 4 | 3ª | 11th | |
| 2012–13 | 4 | 3ª | 12th | |

- 4 seasons in Tercera División
