= CD Intergym Melilla =

Spanish football team

Intergym Melilla
- Full name: Club Deportivo Intergym Melilla
- Founded: 2015
- Dissolved: 2022
- Ground: La Espiguera; Melilla, Spain
- Capacity: 2,000
- Manager: Indalo González
- 2021–22: Tercera División RFEF – Group 9, 17th of 17 (relegated)
Home colours	Away colours

Club Deportivo Intergym Melilla was a Spanish football team based in Melilla. Founded in 2015 and dissolved in 2022, they held home games at Estadio La Espiguera, which has a capacity of 2,000 spectators.

== History ==
Founded in 2015 as the team of Intergym Fitness gym in the city, the club started playing in the following year. In June 2021, the club achieved a first-ever promotion to Tercera División RFEF, after Melilla CD was relegated. Immediately relegated back, Intergym was dissolved in 2022.

== Season to season ==
Season	Tier	Division	Place	Copa del Rey
2016–17	5	1ª Aut.	2nd	
2017–18	5	1ª Aut.	4th	
2018–19	5	1ª Aut.	2nd	
2019–20	5	1ª Aut.	2nd	
2020–21	5	1ª Aut.	1st	
2021–22	5	3ª RFEF	17th	

- 1 season in Tercera División RFEF
