= Abraham Bueno =

Spanish footballer (born 2006)

Personal information
- Full name: Abraham Bueno Espinosa
- Date of birth: 4 January 2006 (age 20)
- Place of birth: Granada, Spain
- Position: Winger

Team information
- Current team: Ceuta B
- Number: 18

Youth career
- 2012–2014: We FC
- 2014–2015: Progress R1
- 2015–2016: Granada
- 2016–2017: Granada 74
- 2017–2020: Granada
- 2020–2022: Arenas Armilla
- 2022–2023: Atarfe Industrial
- 2023: Alhendín
- 2023–2024: Arenas Armilla
- 2024–2025: Castuera

Senior career*
Years	Team	Apps	(Gls)
2025	Castuera	13	(3)
2025–	Ceuta B	8	(0)
2026	→ Castuera (loan)	14	(16)
2026–	Ceuta	1	(0)
- * Club domestic league appearances and goals as of 31 May 2026

Abraham Bueno Espinosa (born 4 January 2006) is a Spanish professional footballer who plays as a winger for AD Ceuta FC B.

== Career ==
Born in Granada, Andalusia, Bueno represented several local sides as a youth before finishing his formation with CD Castuera. He made his senior debut with the side in the 2024–25 season, in Tercera Federación, and signed for AD Ceuta FC's reserves also in the fifth division on 19 June 2025.

In January 2026, after being rarely used, Bueno returned to Castuera on loan, with the side now in the regional leagues. Upon returning, he made his professional debut on 26 September, coming on as a late substitute for Kialy Abdoul Kone and providing the assist to Jordi Escobar's third goal in a 3–1 Segunda División home win over Real Sociedad B.
