= Enrique Romero (footballer, born 1978) =

Spanish footballer (born 1978)

Personal information
- Full name: Enrique Romero Gil
- Date of birth: 9 January 1978 (age 48)
- Place of birth: Gerena, Spain
- Height: 1.76 m (5 ft 9 in)
- Position: Forward

Youth career
- Betis

Senior career*
Years	Team	Apps	(Gls)
1996–2000	Betis B	89	(29)
2000–2002	Mallorca B	30	(9)
2002–2004	Recreativo Huelva	22	(3)
2004–2006	Algeciras	26	(0)
Total		167	(41)
- * Club domestic league appearances and goals

Enrique Romero Gil (born 9 January 1978) is a Spanish former footballer who played as a forward. He played in La Liga for Recreativo de Huelva in 2002–03.

== Career ==
Born in Gerena in the Province of Seville, Romero began his career in the youth ranks of Real Betis. He achieved a career best of 13 goals in Segunda División B for Betis Deportivo in the Segunda División B, but did not break into the first team. In September 2000, he signed for another reserve team in the third tier, namely Mallorca B.

Having again not advanced into the principal squad, Romero moved in June 2002 to newly promoted La Liga side Recreativo de Huelva, on a two-year deal with the option of a third. In January 2003, he was kept in hospital for 24 hours due to an injury in a game against Sevilla, being diagnosed with a grade 1 head injury after being knocked unconscious. He scored his first top-flight goal on 23 February, opening a 3–0 home win over Atlético Madrid two minutes after coming on as a substitute for Javi García, and a week later he scored again in a 3–2 win at Athletic Bilbao. The season ended in relegation, with him getting a third goal on 27 April in a 5–0 win over Villarreal at the Estadio Nuevo Colombino.

Romero was not registered for the start of 2003–04, and moved at the turn of the calendar year to Algeciras in the Segunda División. He retired two years later, through injury.

== Personal life ==
Romero's older brother José Juan was also a footballer, who played in the lower leagues before managing teams such as Betis B and AD Ceuta FC.
