= Chus Trujillo =

Spanish footballer and manager

Personal information
- Full name: Ignacio Jesús Trujillo Cabrera
- Date of birth: 6 July 1971 (age 55)
- Place of birth: Las Palmas, Spain

Senior career*
Years	Team	Apps	(Gls)
- Atlético Tenoya

Managerial career
- 2004–2007: Atlético Tenoya (youth)
- 2007–2009: Las Palmas (youth)
- 2009–2013: Goleta
- 2013–2014: San Antonio
- 2014–2016: Las Palmas C
- 2016–2017: Las Palmas B (assistant)
- 2017–2021: Tamaraceite
- 2021–2022: Ceuta
- 2023–2024: Terrassa
- * Club domestic league appearances and goals

Ignacio Jesús "Chus" Trujillo Cabrera (born 6 July 1971) is a Spanish football coach who is a current manager.

== Career ==
Trujillo was born in Tenoya, Las Palmas, Canary Islands, and played for local side CA Tenoya before becoming manager of their Cadete squad in 2004. In 2007, after one year in charge of their Juvenil team, he moved to UD Las Palmas as an assistant of the Juvenil División de Honor squad and manager of the Juvenil C team.

Ahead of the 2009–10 season, Trujillo was named manager of CD Goleta in the Segunda Regional, leading the club to a promotion to the Primera de Aficionados in his first year, and to the Interinsular Preferente in 2013. Shortly after his second promotion, however, he was named at the helm of UD San Antonio also in the fifth tier.

In July 2014, Trujillo returned to Las Palmas after being announced as manager of the C-team also in division five. On 16 June 2016, he became Manolo Márquez's assistant at the reserves, but left the club in the following year, after Márquez was named in charge of the first team.

On 14 November 2017, Trujillo was appointed manager of Tamaraceite; he was already a technical secretary of the club since their refoundation in 2015. He led the club back to Tercera División after 34 years in his first season, and also won their group in his second, missing out promotion in the play-offs; he also renewed his contract with Támara in the process.

During the curtailed 2019–20 season, Trujillo led Tamaraceite to the play-offs once again, achieving a first-ever promotion to Segunda División B, and extended his link for a further year on 20 August 2020. On 24 June 2021, after avoiding relegation, he left the club.

On 25 June 2021, a day after leaving Tamaraceite, Trujillo was named manager of Segunda División RFEF side AD Ceuta FC. He led the club to promotion to Primera Federación at the end of the campaign, but was sacked on 18 September 2022, after a winless start to the 2022–23 season.

On 4 October 2023, after more than a year without a club, Trujillo was appointed in charge of Terrassa FC also in the fourth division.

== Managerial statistics ==
As of 3 November 2024

Managerial record by team and tenure
Team	Nat	From	To	Record								Ref
Team	Nat	From	To	G	W	D	L	GF	GA	GD	Win %	Ref
Goleta	(Spain)	1 July 2009	30 June 2013	136	77	29	30	258	126	+132	56.62	
San Antonio	(Spain)	1 July 2013	30 May 2014	32	18	3	11	47	27	+20	56.25	
Las Palmas C	(Spain)	31 May 2014	16 June 2016	66	38	21	7	135	58	+77	57.58	
Tamaraceite	(Spain)	14 November 2017	24 June 2021	123	64	36	23	216	111	+105	52.03	
Ceuta	(Spain)	25 June 2021	18 September 2022	40	16	12	12	52	40	+12	40.00	
Terrassa	(Spain)	4 October 2023	5 November 2024	42	17	14	11	55	45	+10	40.48	
Total				439	230	115	94	763	407	+356	52.39	—
