= Daniel Mas (footballer) =

Spanish footballer

Personal information
- Full name: Daniel Mas Soria
- Date of birth: 15 August 2005 (age 21)
- Place of birth: Mislata, Spain
- Position: Centre-back

Team information
- Current team: Ceuta B
- Number: 5

Youth career
- Valencia
- Mislata UF
- 2018–2019: Villarreal
- 2019–2020: Roda
- 2020–2021: Villarreal
- 2021–2022: Roda
- 2022–2024: Villarreal

Senior career*
Years	Team	Apps	(Gls)
2024–2025	Roda	32	(0)
2025–	Ceuta B	3	(1)
2026–	Ceuta	1	(0)

International career
2020	Spain U15	2	(0)
- * Club domestic league appearances and goals as of 15 August 2026

Daniel Mas Soria (born 15 August 2005) is a Spanish footballer who plays as a centre-back for AD Ceuta FC B.

== Club career ==
Born in Mislata, Valencian Community, Mas joined Villarreal CF's youth categories in 2018, from hometown side Mislata UF. After switching between the squads of the club and affiliate CD Roda, he was assigned to the latter's first team for the 2024–25 season, in Tercera Federación.

Regularly used, Mas moved to AD Ceuta FC on 20 June 2025, being initially assigned to the reserves also in the fifth tier. On 10 July of the following year, he renewed his contract for a further season.

Mas made his professional debut with the Caballas on 15 August 2026, his 21st birthday, by starting in a 5–1 away loss to FC Andorra.

== International career ==
Mas represented the Spain national under-15 team on two occasions, playing in two friendlies against the Republic of Ireland and the Czech Republic.
