= CB Ramón y Cajal =

Multi-sports club in Spain

Ramón y Cajal
- Full name: Club Balonmano Ramón y Cajal
- Founded: 2003
- Ground: José Martínez Pirri
- Capacity: 1,500
- Chairman: Yunes Mohamed Prim
- Manager: Damián Torres
- 2020–21: Regional Preferente, retired
Home colours	Away colours

Club Balonmano Ramón y Cajal is a Spanish multi-sports club based in the autonomous city of Ceuta. Founded in 2003, their football team plays in Regional Preferente de Ceuta, holding home games at Estadio José Martínez Pirri, with a capacity of 1,000 people.

== Season to season ==
Season	Tier	Division	Place	Copa del Rey
2009–10	5	Reg. Pref.	7th	
2010–11	DNP			
2011–12	5	Reg. Pref.	4th	
2012–13	5	Reg. Pref.	4th	
2013–14	5	Reg. Pref.	3rd	
2014–15	5	Reg. Pref.	1st	
2015–16	5	Reg. Pref.	1st	
2016–17	DNP			
2017–18	5	Reg. Pref.	3rd	
2018–19	5	Reg. Pref.	1st	
2019–20	5	Reg. Pref.	4th	Preliminary
2020–21	5	Reg. Pref.	(R)	
