= Josema =

Josema is a Spanish nickname, mainly as a short compound to "José Manuel". It may refer to:

- Josema (footballer, born 1996), (José Manuel Sánchez Guillén), Spanish football defender
- Josema (footballer, born 2003), (José Manuel López Pérez), Spanish football midfielder
