= Álex Camacho =

Spanish footballer (born 2007)

Personal information
- Full name: Alejandro Camacho Ramírez
- Date of birth: 31 January 1998 (age 28)
- Place of birth: Cortes de la Frontera, Spain
- Height: 1.78 m (5 ft 10 in)
- Position: Winger

Team information
- Current team: Ceuta
- Number: 7

Youth career
- Ronda
- 2016–2017: UCAM Murcia

Senior career*
Years	Team	Apps	(Gls)
2015–2016	Ronda	30	(3)
2017–2019	UCAM Murcia B	50	(6)
2018–2020	UCAM Murcia	22	(0)
2020–2021	Alcoyano	9	(0)
2021	Salamanca	15	(3)
2021–2022	Vélez	33	(4)
2022–2023	Atlético Saguntino	8	(0)
2023–2026	Juventud Torremolinos	99	(19)
2026–	Ceuta	1	(0)
- * Club domestic league appearances and goals as of 15 August 2026

Alejandro "Álex" Camacho Ramírez (born 31 January 1998) is a Spanish footballer who plays mainly as a right winger for AD Ceuta FC.

== Career ==
Born in Cortes de la Frontera, Málaga, Andalusia, Camacho made his senior debut with hometown side CD Ronda before moving to UCAM Murcia CF in 2016. Initially a member of the Juvenil squad, he subsequently represented the reserves before making his first team debut in Segunda División B in 2018.

Camacho left UCAM in September 2020, and moved to fellow third division side CD Alcoyano the following month. On 26 January 2021, he signed for fellow league team Salamanca CF UDS.

On 25 June 2021, Camacho agreed to a deal with Segunda División RFEF side Vélez CF. He moved to fellow league team Atlético Saguntino on 20 July 2022, but signed for Juventud de Torremolinos CF the following 3 February.

Despite suffering relegation, Camacho was a key unit of Torremolinos in their two consecutive promotions, the second one to Primera Federación. On 19 June 2026, he left the club after rejecting a new contract.

On 30 June 2026, Segunda División side AD Ceuta FC announced the signing of Camacho on a two-year deal. He made his professional debut on 15 August, starting in a 5–1 away loss to FC Andorra.
