= Yeyo (footballer) =

Spanish footballer

Personal information
- Full name: Sergio González González
- Date of birth: 6 October 2007 (age 19)
- Place of birth: Marbella, Spain
- Position: Forward

Team information
- Current team: Ceuta B
- Number: 39

Youth career
- 2018–2020: Marbella
- 2020–2023: Marbella Paraíso
- 2023–2025: Marbella
- 2025: Mijas-Las Lagunas
- 2025–: Sporting Atlético

Senior career*
Years	Team	Apps	(Gls)
2026–	Ceuta B	3	(0)
2026–	Ceuta	1	(0)
- * Club domestic league appearances and goals as of 11 March 2026

Sergio González González (born 6 October 2007), commonly known as Yeyo, is a Spanish professional footballer who plays as a forward for AD Ceuta FC B.

== Career ==
Born in Marbella, Málaga, Andalusia, Yeyo played for local sides Marbella FC and CD Atlético Marbella Paraíso before moving to CP Mijas-Las Lagunas in January 2025. In June of that year, he joined Sporting Atlético de Ceuta.

After impressing with the Juvenil side of Sporting, Yeyo made his senior debut with affiliate side AD Ceuta FC's reserves on 10 January 2026, playing the last 21 minutes of a 0–0 Tercera Federación home draw against CD San Roque de Lepe. He made his first team – and professional – debut on 8 March, coming on as a late substitute for Rubén Díez in a 4–0 Segunda División away loss to UD Las Palmas.
