= Redru =

Spanish footballer

Personal information
- Full name: Carlos Redruello Nimo
- Date of birth: 23 June 1997 (age 29)
- Place of birth: Seville, Spain
- Height: 1.83 m (6 ft 0 in)
- Position: Left-back

Team information
- Current team: Ceuta
- Number: 16

Youth career
- Calavera
- 2012–2016: Betis

Senior career*
Years	Team	Apps	(Gls)
2016–2018	Betis B	46	(2)
2017–2019	Betis	0	(0)
2018–2019	→ Elche (loan)	5	(0)
2019	→ Racing Santander (loan)	6	(0)
2019–2021	Marbella	53	(1)
2021–2022	Eldense	33	(0)
2022–2023	Cornellà	36	(3)
2023–	Ceuta	91	(0)
- * Club domestic league appearances and goals as of 9 June 2026

Carlos Redruello Nimo (born 23 June 1997), commonly known as Redru, is a Spanish footballer who plays as a left-back for Segunda División club Ceuta.

== Club career ==
Born in Seville, Andalusia, Redru joined Real Betis' youth setup in 2012, from Calavera CF. On 12 May 2017, while still a junior, he renewed his contract until 2021.

Redru made his senior debut with the B-team on 6 November 2016, starting in a 2–1 Tercera División home win against CD Utrera. He scored his first goal the following 2 April, netting the equalizer in a 1–1 home draw against UB Lebrijana.

Redru made his first team debut on 24 October 2017, playing the full 90 minutes in a 2–1 away win against Cádiz CF, for the season's Copa del Rey. The following 4 May, he was loaned to Elche CF in the third division until the end of the play-offs.

On 22 January 2019, Redru's loan was terminated, and he moved to Racing de Santander also in a temporary deal just hours later. On 16 July, he signed a permanent deal with third division side Marbella FC.

On 9 July 2021, after suffering relegation, Redru agreed to a deal with Segunda División RFEF side CD Eldense. On 14 August 2022, after helping the club to achieve promotion to Primera Federación, he joined UE Cornellà also in that division.

On 28 June 2023, Redru signed for fellow third division side AD Ceuta FC. Roughly one year later, he renewed his contract until 2026.
