= AD Ceuta B =

Spanish football team

Ceuta B
- Full name: Asociación Deportiva Ceuta B
- Founded: 1997
- Dissolved: 2012
- Ground: Alfonso Murube, Ceuta, Spain
- Capacity: 6,500
- 2011–12: Regional Preferente, 5th of 8
Home colours	Away colours

Asociación Deportiva Ceuta B was a Spanish football team based in the autonomous city of Ceuta. Founded in 1996, it was the reserve team of AD Ceuta, and held home matches at Estadio Alfonso Murube, with a capacity of 6,500.

== History ==
In 1997, Ceuta B was created as the reserve team of newly-formed Asociación Deportiva Ceuta, and achieved promotion to Tercera División in 1999. After suffering immediate relegation, the club played a further season in Regional Preferente before ceasing activities for one year.

Ceuta B returned to an active status in 2002, winning two Preferente titles (in the 2004–05 and 2006–07 seasons) but not achieving promotion on both occasions. In 2005, the club won the first leg against Melilla-based side CD Basto by 5–3, and despite being 2–0 ahead in the second leg, they were eliminated after a court decision which gave Basto a 3–0 win, knocking Ceuta B out of the competition. In 2007, the club defeated CD Peña Ciudad de Melilla 3–2 on aggregate, but gave up on playing in the fourth tier in July of that year, due to the lack of budget.

== Season to season ==
Season	Tier	Division	Place
1997–98	5	Reg. Pref.	2nd
1998–99	5	Reg. Pref.	1st
1999–2000	4	3ª	20th
2000–01	5	Reg. Pref.	7th
2001–02	DNP		
2002–03	5	Reg. Pref.	11th
2003–04	5	Reg. Pref.	5th
2004–05	5	Reg. Pref.	1st

Season	Tier	Division	Place
2005–06	5	Reg. Pref.	9th
2006–07	5	Reg. Pref.	1st
2007–08	5	Reg. Pref.	2nd
2008–09	5	Reg. Pref.	2nd
2009–10	5	Reg. Pref.	2nd
2010–11	5	Reg. Pref.	4th
2011–12	5	Reg. Pref.	5th

- 1 season in Tercera División

== Notable players ==
- (Morocco) Munir Mohamedi
