= Marino Illescas =

Spanish footballer

Personal information
- Full name: Marino Illescas Montaño
- Date of birth: 9 January 2001 (age 25)
- Place of birth: Écija, Spain
- Height: 1.76 m (5 ft 9 in)
- Position: Midfielder

Team information
- Current team: Ceuta
- Number: 12

Youth career
- Écija
- 2018–2020: Sevilla

Senior career*
Years	Team	Apps	(Gls)
2020–2022	Alavés B	39	(3)
2022–2023	Burgos B	28	(2)
2023	Burgos	2	(0)
2023–2025	Algeciras	47	(2)
2024	→ Arenteiro (loan)	16	(0)
2025–2026	Mirandés	11	(0)
2026–	Ceuta	19	(0)
- * Club domestic league appearances and goals as of 9 June 2026

Marino Illescas Montaño (born 5 May 2001) is a Spanish footballer who plays as a midfielder for AD Ceuta FC.

== Club career ==
Illescas was born in Écija, Seville, Andalusia, and joined Sevilla FC's youth setup in 2018, from hometown side Écija Balompié. In August 2020, after finishing his formation, he signed for Deportivo Alavés and was assigned to the reserves in Segunda División B.

In 2022, Illescas moved to another reserve team, Burgos CF Promesas in Segunda Federación. He made his first team debut on 15 January of the following year, coming on as a late substitute for Álex Bermejo in a 2–1 Segunda División home win over FC Andorra.

On 16 July 2023, Illescas joined Primera Federación side Algeciras CF. The following 22 January, he was loaned to fellow league team CD Arenteiro until June.

Upon returning, Illescas established himself as a regular starter with Algeciras during the 2024–25 campaign, and signed a one-year contract with CD Mirandés in the second division on 6 July 2025. The following 21 January, he terminated his link with the club, and moved to fellow league team AD Ceuta FC on an 18-month contract just hours later.
