= CD Polillas Ceuta =

Spanish football club

- Full name: Club Deportivo Polillas Ceuta
- Founded: 1991; 35 years ago as CG Goyu-Ryu
- Ground: Alfonso Murube Stadium
- Capacity: 6,500
- Owner: Batavia Sports Group
- Manager: Ade Prima Syarif
- 2020–21: Regional Preferente, 9th of 14
- Website: https://www.polillasceuta.es/
Home colours	Away colours

Club Deportivo Polillas Ceuta, abbreviated as CD Polillas Ceuta, is a football club based in the Spanish enclave of Ceuta, in North Africa.

CD Polillas Ceuta is reportedly experiencing a financial crisis because of COVID-19. After being taken over by BSG, the name of the club which was originally Gimnastica Ceuta was changed to CD Polillas Ceuta.

== History ==
Founded in 1991 as Club Gimnasio Goyu-Ryu, the club was renamed Club Gimnástica Ceuta in July 2017. In May 2020, Gimnástica switched name to Club Deportivo Polillas Ceuta.

== Season to season ==
=== Goyu-Ryu / Gimnástica Ceuta ===
Season	Tier	Division	Place	Copa del Rey
1993–94	5	Reg. Pref.	2nd	
1994–95	DNP			
1995–96	DNP			
1996–97	DNP			
1997–98	5	Reg. Pref.	(R)	
1998–99	DNP			
1999–2000	DNP			
2000–01	5	Reg. Pref.	1st	
2001–02	5	Reg. Pref.	2nd	
2002–03	5	Reg. Pref.	1st	
2003–04	5	Reg. Pref.	6th	
2004–05	5	Reg. Pref.	7th	
2005–06	5	Reg. Pref.	4th	
2006–07	5	Reg. Pref.	8th	
2007–08	5	Reg. Pref.	6th	
2008–2013	DNP			
2013–14	5	Reg. Pref.	9th	

=== Polillas Ceuta ===
Season	Tier	Division	Place	Copa del Rey
2008–09	5	Reg. Pref.	7th	
2009–2020	DNP			
2020–21	5	Reg. Pref.	9th	
