= Adrián Romero (Spanish footballer) =

Spanish footballer

Personal information
- Full name: Adrián Romero González
- Date of birth: 27 February 2006 (age 20)
- Place of birth: Gerena, Spain
- Position: Midfielder

Team information
- Current team: Ceuta B
- Number: 26

Youth career
- 2022–2023: CDM Gerena
- 2023–2025: Sporting Atlético

Senior career*
Years	Team	Apps	(Gls)
2024–	Ceuta B	16	(0)
2026–	Ceuta	1	(0)
- * Club domestic league appearances and goals as of 30 August 2026

Adrián Romero González (born 27 February 2006) is a Spanish professional footballer who plays as a midfielder for AD Ceuta FC.

== Career ==
Born in Gerena, Seville, Andalusia, Romero joined Sporting Atlético de Ceuta, an affiliate team of AD Ceuta FC, in 2023. He made his senior debut with the reserves on 12 May 2024, coming on as a late substitute in a 1–0 Tercera Federación away loss to CD Gerena.

On 26 July 2025, Romero signed a permanent deal with Ceuta's reserves. On 10 July of the following year, he renewed his contract for a further season.

Romero made his first team debut with the Caballas on 30 August 2026, replacing Yann Bodiger late into a 3–0 Segunda División away loss to RCD Mallorca.

== Personal life ==
Romero's father José Juan was also a footballer and midfielder, and later became a manager.
