= Atlético Melilla CF =

Association football club in Spain

Atlético Melilla
- Full name: Atlético Melilla Club de Fútbol
- Founded: 2022 (refounded)
- Ground: La Espiguera, Melilla, Spain
- Capacity: 2,000
- Owner: Mohand Amar Chaib 'Biri'
- Manager: Salah Amar
- League: Primera Autonómica de Melilla
- 2025–26: Primera Autonómica de Melilla, 1st of 4 (champions)
Home colours	Away colours

Atlético Melilla Club de Fútbol is a Spanish football club based in the autonomous city of Melilla. They play in Primera Autonómica de Melilla, holding home games at Estadio La Espiguera, which has a capacity of 2,000 spectators.

== History ==
Atlético Melilla played their first senior season in 2012–13, finishing fifth in the Primera Autonómica. They won the league in 2014, achieving a first-ever promotion to Tercera División.

After suffering immediate relegation, Atlético Melilla ceased activities, only returning in 2022. They achieved an immediate promotion to Tercera Federación, being relegated back afterwards.

== Season to season ==
Season	Tier	Division	Place	Copa del Rey
2012–13	5	1ª Aut.	5th	
2013–14	5	1ª Aut.	1st	
2014–15	4	3ª	19th	
2015–2022	DNP			
2022–23	6	1ª Aut.	1st	
2023–24	5	3ª Fed.	18th	
2024–25	6	1ª Aut.	2nd	
2025–26	6	1ª Aut.	1st	
2026–27	6	1ª Aut.		Preliminary

- 1 season in Tercera División
- 1 season in Tercera Federación
