= Mawuli Mensah =

Ghanaian footballer (born 2003)

Personal information
- Full name: Mawuli Kwame Mensah Vadze
- Date of birth: 15 November 2003 (age 22)
- Place of birth: Accra, Ghana
- Height: 1.72 m (5 ft 8 in)
- Position: Midfielder

Team information
- Current team: Ceuta

Youth career
- Utrecht
- Vázquez Cultural
- 2022: Antequera

Senior career*
Years	Team	Apps	(Gls)
2022–2023	Antequera	55	(4)
2023–2026	Betis B	62	(8)
2026	Zaragoza	13	(0)
2026–	Ceuta	0	(0)
- * Club domestic league appearances and goals as of 31 May 2026

Mawuli Kwame Mensah Vadze (born 15 November 2003) is a Ghanaian footballer who plays as a midfielder for Spanish club AD Ceuta FC.

== Career ==
Born in Accra, Mensah left his home country at the age of 13, and joined Antequera CF's youth sides in January 2022, after a period at FC Utrecht and playing for CD Vázquez Cultural from Marbella. He quickly established himself as a starter for the side in Segunda Federación, and renewed his contract until 2024 on 26 October of that year.

Mensah impressed with Antequera during the 2022–23 season as the club achieved promotion to Primera Federación, and attracted the interest of Real Betis and FC Barcelona. On 31 July 2023, he moved to the former on a three-year deal, being initially assigned to the reserves in the fourth division.

A regular starter for Betis Deportivo as they also achieved promotion to division three, Mensah suffered a knee injury in late May 2024, only returning to action in February 2025. After making the pre-season with the first team, he was also an unused substitute in the first matches of 2025–26 La Liga.

On 2 February 2026, Mensah moved to Segunda División side Real Zaragoza on a six-month contract, with an option for a further two years. He made his professional debut five days later, starting in a 1–1 home loss against SD Eibar.

On 21 August 2026, free agent Mensah agreed to a two-year deal with AD Ceuta FC also in division two.
