= Enol Rodríguez =

Spanish footballer (born 2001)

Personal information
- Full name: Enol Rodríguez Heres
- Date of birth: 28 July 2001 (age 25)
- Place of birth: Candás, Spain
- Height: 1.86 m (6 ft 1 in)
- Position: Forward

Team information
- Current team: Córdoba

Youth career
- Candás
- 2019–2020: Marino Luanco

Senior career*
| Years | Team | Apps | (Gls) |
| 2019 | Candás | 1 | (0) |
| 2020–2021 | Marino Luanco | 19 | (2) |
| 2021–2022 | Logroñés B | 28 | (4) |
| 2022–2024 | Oviedo B | 51 | (6) |
| 2023–2024 | Oviedo | 2 | (0) |
| 2024–2025 | Arenteiro | 35 | (7) |
| 2025–2026 | Huesca | 34 | (5) |
| 2026– | Córdoba | 0 | (0) |
- * Club domestic league appearances and goals as of 9 June 2026

Enol Rodríguez Heres (born 28 July 2001) is a Spanish footballer who plays as a forward for Córdoba CF.

== Career ==
Born in Candás, Asturias, Rodríguez began his career with hometown side Candás CF, making his first team debut on 9 March 2019 by starting in a 2–2 Regional Preferente home draw against CD Vallobín. In July of that year, he moved to Marino de Luanco and returned to youth football.

In July 2021, after already featuring for Marino's first team in Segunda División B, Rodríguez joined UD Logroñés and was initially assigned to the reserves in Segunda División RFEF. On 22 June 2022, he signed for another reserve team, Real Oviedo Vetusta also in the fourth tier.

Rodríguez made his first team debut with the Carbayones on 17 February 2023, coming on as a half-time substitute for Koba Koindredi in a 2–1 Segunda División away loss against FC Cartagena. On 23 August of the following year, he signed for Primera Federación side CD Arenteiro.

On 7 July 2025, Rodríguez joined second division side SD Huesca on a three-year contract. On 28 June of the following year, after suffering relegation, he moved to fellow league team Córdoba CF on a two-year deal.
