= Cedric Teguia =

Spanish footballer

Cedric
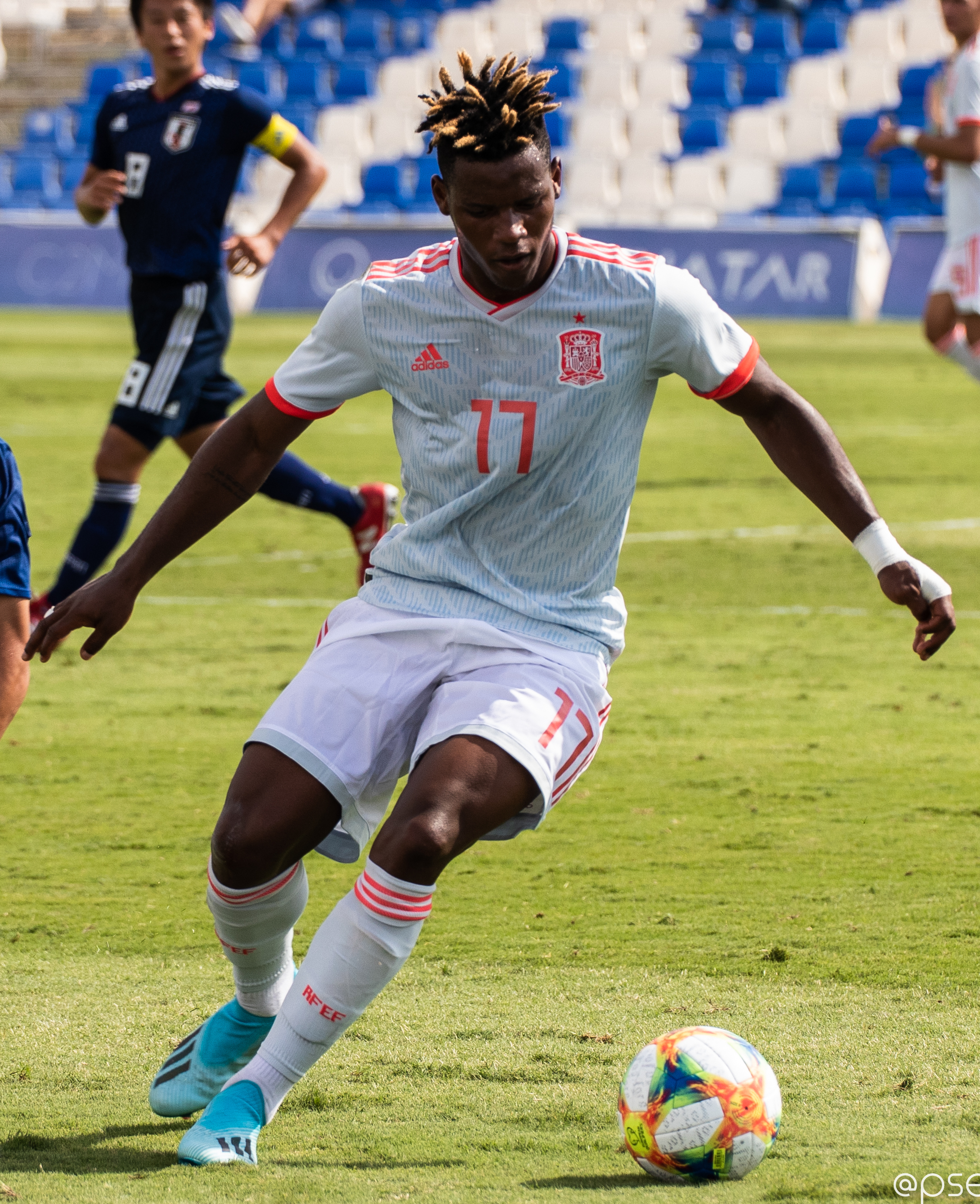

Personal information
- Full name: Cedric Wilfred Teguia Noubi
- Date of birth: 1 October 2001 (age 25)
- Place of birth: Douala, Cameroon
- Height: 1.80 m (5 ft 11 in)
- Position: Winger

Team information
- Current team: Ceuta

Youth career
- 2012–2019: Atlético Madrid

Senior career*
Years	Team	Apps	(Gls)
2018–2023	Atlético Madrid B	20	(1)
2020–2021	→ Oviedo (loan)	9	(0)
2021	→ Albacete (loan)	11	(0)
2021–2022	→ Celta B (loan)	33	(4)
2022–2023	→ Córdoba (loan)	12	(0)
2023	→ Intercity (loan)	15	(1)
2023–2024	Ceuta	35	(8)
2024–2025	Cartagena	21	(2)
2025–2026	Moreirense	34	(2)
2026–	Ceuta	0	(0)

International career
2017–2018	Spain U17	5	(0)
2018–2019	Spain U18	10	(2)
2019–2020	Spain U19	5	(0)
2019	Spain U20	5	(2)
- * Club domestic league appearances and goals as of 25 May 2026

Cedric Wilfred Teguia Noubi (born 1 October 2001) is a professional footballer who plays as a left winger for AD Ceuta FC. Born in Cameroon, he has represented Spain at youth level.

== Club career ==
Born in Douala, Cedric joined Atlético Madrid's youth setup in 2012. On 4 November 2018, aged just 17, he made his senior debut with the reserves by coming on as a half-time substitute for Pinchi in a 1–1 Segunda División B away draw against Burgos CF.

Cedric scored his first senior goal on 15 September 2019, netting his team's fourth in a 4–0 home routing of UD Las Palmas Atlético. On 27 August of the following year, he moved to Segunda División side Real Oviedo on loan for the 2020–21 season.

Cedric made his professional debut on 13 September 2020, replacing Borja Sánchez in a 0–0 home draw against FC Cartagena. His loan was cut short the following 1 February, and moved to fellow league team Albacete Balompié also in a temporary deal just hours later.

On 24 August 2021, Cedric moved to another reserve team, Celta de Vigo B in Primera División RFEF, on a one-year loan deal. He subsequently served loans at fellow league teams Córdoba CF and CF Intercity, before signing a permanent deal with AD Ceuta FC on 30 August 2023.

On 26 June 2024, Cedric signed a two-year contract with Cartagena in the second division. The following 3 February, however, he moved abroad and signed for Moreirense FC in Portugal.

On 28 June 2026, Cedric returned to Spain and its second division, after agreeing to a two-year deal with Ceuta.
