= CF Rusadir =

Association football club in Spain

Rusadir
- Full name: Club de Fútbol Rusadir
- Founded: 2001
- Dissolved: 2021
- Ground: La Espiguera, Melilla, Spain
- Capacity: 2,000
- President: Najib Yamili-Mizzian Mohamed
- Manager: Lahasid Kouraich
- League: None
- 2020–21: Primera Autonómica, 3rd of 6
Home colours	Away colours

Club de Fútbol Rusadir was a Spanish football club based in the autonomous city of Melilla. Founded in 2001 and dissolved in 2021, they held home games at Estadio La Espiguera, which has a capacity of 2,000 spectators.

== Season to season ==
Season	Tier	Division	Place	Copa del Rey
2001–02	5	1ª Aut.	1st	
2002–03	5	1ª Aut.	6th	
2003–04	5	1ª Aut.	1st	
2004–05	4	3ª	20th	
2005–2017	DNP			
2017–18	5	1ª Aut.	2nd	
2018–19	DNP			
2019–20	5	1ª Aut.	1st	
2020–21	5	1ª Aut.	1st	Preliminary
2021–22	DNP			

- 1 season in Tercera División
