= Albert Caparrós =

Spanish footballer

Personal information
- Full name: Albert Caparrós Guzmán
- Date of birth: 14 October 1998 (age 28)
- Place of birth: Terrassa, Spain
- Height: 1.84 m (6 ft 0 in)
- Position: Centre-back

Team information
- Current team: Ceuta
- Number: 4

Youth career
- Jàbac Terrassa

Senior career*
Years	Team	Apps	(Gls)
2017–2018	Sant Cugat	31	(3)
2018–2019	Granollers	28	(0)
2019–2020	Prat	6	(0)
2020–2021	Horta	8	(0)
2021–2022	Ceuta	41	(2)
2022–2023	Cacereño	10	(0)
2023–	Ceuta	68	(2)
- * Club domestic league appearances and goals as of 9 June 2026

Albert Caparrós Guzmán (born 14 October 1998), sometimes known as Capa, is a Spanish professional footballer who plays for AD Ceuta FC. Mainly a centre-back, he can also play as a right-back.

== Career ==
Born in Terrassa, Barcelona, Catalonia, Caparrós played for hometown side UFB Jàbac Terrassa as a youth. He made his senior debut with Primera Catalana side Sant Cugat FC in the 2017–18 season, before joining Tercera División side EC Granollers in June 2018.

On 12 July 2019, Caparrós moved to AE Prat in Segunda División B. After being rarely used, he signed for UA Horta in the fourth division in September 2020, but left the club the following 15 January to join fellow league team AD Ceuta FC.

On 12 July 2022, Caparrós agreed to a deal with Segunda Federación side CP Cacereño. The following 10 January, however, he returned to Ceuta, with the club now in Primera Federación.

Caparrós would continue to feature for the Caballas in the following years, becoming team captain and featuring in 17 matches during the 2024–25 campaign, as the club achieved promotion to Segunda División. In July 2025, his contract was automatically renewed for a further year, after a clause for a minimum number of appearances was reached.
