= UD Melilla B =

Association football club in Spain

- Full name: Unión Deportiva Melilla "B"
- Founded: 2013 (refounded – merged with Casino del Real CF)
- Ground: La Espiguera, Melilla, Spain
- Capacity: 2,000
- League: Tercera Federación – Group 9
- 2024–25: Primera Autonómica de Melilla, 1st of 5 (champions)
Home colours	Away colours

Unión Deportiva Melilla "B" is a Spanish football team based in the autonomous city of Melilla. The reserve team of UD Melilla, the club was refounded in 2013 after a merger with Casino del Real CF, and holds home matches at Estadio La Espiguera, which has a capacity of 2,000 spectators.

== Season to season ==
Season	Tier	Division	Place
1989–90	5	1ª Aut.	1st
1990–91	4	3ª	15th
1991–92	5	1ª Aut.	4th
1992–93	5	1ª Aut.	3rd
1993–94	5	1ª Aut.	3rd
1994–95	5	1ª Aut.	2nd
1995–96	5	1ª Aut.	1st
1996–97	4	3ª	18th
1997–98	5	1ª Aut.	3rd
1998–99	5	1ª Aut.	1st
1999–2000	5	1ª Aut.	1st
2000–01	5	1ª Aut.	1st

Season	Tier	Division	Place
2001–02	4	3ª	(R)
2002–03	5	1ª Aut.	2nd
2003–04	5	1ª Aut.	2nd
2004–05	DNP		
2005–06	5	1ª Aut.	2nd
2006–07	5	1ª Aut.	5th
2007–08	5	1ª Aut.	3rd
2008–09	DNP		
2009–10	5	1ª Aut.	3rd
2010–11	5	1ª Aut.	3rd
2011–12	5	1ª Aut.	1st

- Merger with Casino del Real CF

Season	Tier	Division	Place
2013–14	4	3ª	18th
2014–2018	DNP		
2018–19	5	1ª Aut.	4th
2019–20	5	1ª Aut.	3rd
2020–21	DNP		
2021–22	6	1ª Aut.	5th
2022–23	DNP		
2023–24	DNP		
2024–25	6	1ª Aut.	1st
2025–26	5	3ª Fed.	

- 4 seasons in Tercera División
- 1 season in Tercera Federación
