= Kialy Abdoul Kone =

Ivorian footballer

Personal information
- Full name: Kialy Abdoul Kone
- Date of birth: 8 April 1997 (age 29)
- Place of birth: Abidjan, Ivory Coast
- Height: 1.82 m (6 ft 0 in)
- Position: Winger

Team information
- Current team: Ceuta
- Number: 22

Youth career
- 2014–2016: Alcalá

Senior career*
Years	Team	Apps	(Gls)
2016–2017	Toledo B	24	(1)
2017–2019	Tres Cantos	56	(3)
2019–2020	Gijón Industrial	27	(9)
2020–2021	Sporting B	26	(5)
2021–2023	Castellón	64	(9)
2023–2024	Nea Salamina	33	(1)
2024–2025	Al-Yarmouk		
2025–	Ceuta	50	(6)
- * Club domestic league appearances and goals as of 9 June 2026

Kialy Abdoul Kone (born 8 April 1997) is an Ivorian professional footballer who plays for Segunda División club AD Ceuta FC. Mainly a winger, he can also play as a forward.

== Career ==
After playing in his home country, Kone was brought to Spain in 2015, aged 18, and initially joined the youth sides of RSD Alcalá. After finishing his youth spell, he made his senior debut with CD Toledo's reserves in Tercera División, before moving to fellow league team CDF Tres Cantos in 2017.

In 2019, Kone signed for UD Gijón Industrial also in the fourth division. In September of the following year, he moved to Segunda División B side Sporting de Gijón B on trial, and eventually agreed to a contract the side on 2 October.

On 3 July 2021, Kone was announced at CD Castellón also in the third tier, on a two-year contract. On 18 August 2023, he left Spain and joined Cypriot First Division side Nea Salamis Famagusta FC.

In July 2024, Kone switched teams and countries again, after signing for Kuwaiti Premier League side Al-Yarmouk SC. He returned to Spain the following 9 January, signing a six-month deal with Primera Federación side AD Ceuta FC, and was regularly used as the club achieved promotion to Segunda División.

Kone made his professional debut at the age of 27 on 15 August 2025, starting in a 3–0 away loss to Real Valladolid, and scored his first goal on 7 September, in a 2–1 home win over SD Huesca. On 14 July 2026, after still remaining as a first-choice, he renewed his contract until 2028.
