= José Juan Romero =

Spanish football manager (born 1974)

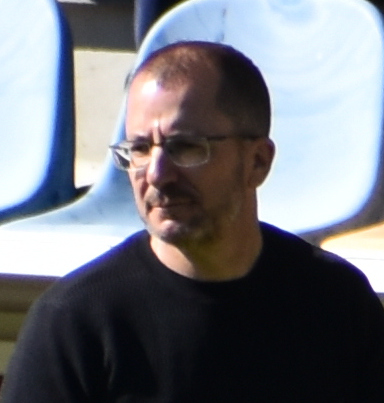
- Romero managing Ceuta in 2023

Personal information
- Full name: José Juan Romero Gil
- Date of birth: 22 November 1974 (age 51)
- Place of birth: Gerena, Spain
- Position: Midfielder

Youth career
- Gerena CF
- Atlético Oromana

Senior career*
| Years | Team | Apps | (Gls) |
- Salteras
- Marchena
| 1999–2002 | Tomares | | (14) |
| 2002–2004 | Dos Hermanas | | |
| 2004–2005 | Tomares | | (1) |
| 2005–2006 | Cerro Águila | | |

Managerial career
- 2006–2016: Gerena
- 2016–2019: Betis B
- 2019–2021: Ceuta
- 2021–2022: Eldense
- 2022–2026: Ceuta
- * Club domestic league appearances and goals

José Juan Romero Gil (born 22 November 1974) is a Spanish professional football manager and former player who played as a midfielder. He was most recently the head coach of Segunda División club Ceuta.

== Playing career ==
Born in Gerena, Seville, Andalusia, Romero represented Gerena CF and CD Atlético Oromana as a youth before making his senior debut with CD Salteras. He later moved to Tercera División side UD Tomares after a period with CF Marchena Balompié, and represented Dos Hermanas CF in the same category.

In 2006, after another stint at Tomares, Romero retired with AD Cerro del Águila at the age of 31.

== Managerial career ==
Shortly after retiring, Romero returned to his hometown and took over the first team of newly created club CD Gerena. While in charge of them, he achieved four promotions in seven years, leading the side to Tercera División; during the 2014–15 season, his team finished third, missing out promotion to Segunda División B in the play-offs.

On 23 February 2016, Romero left Gerena after being appointed manager of Real Betis' reserves in the third division. On 5 June 2019, after failing to achieve promotion from the fourth tier, he left the club, and was named in charge of AD Ceuta FC also in the fourth tier nine days later.

On 19 June 2021, Romero was appointed CD Eldense manager in Segunda División RFEF. He led the club to a promotion to Primera Federación, but was sacked on 5 July 2022 due to "disciplinary reasons".

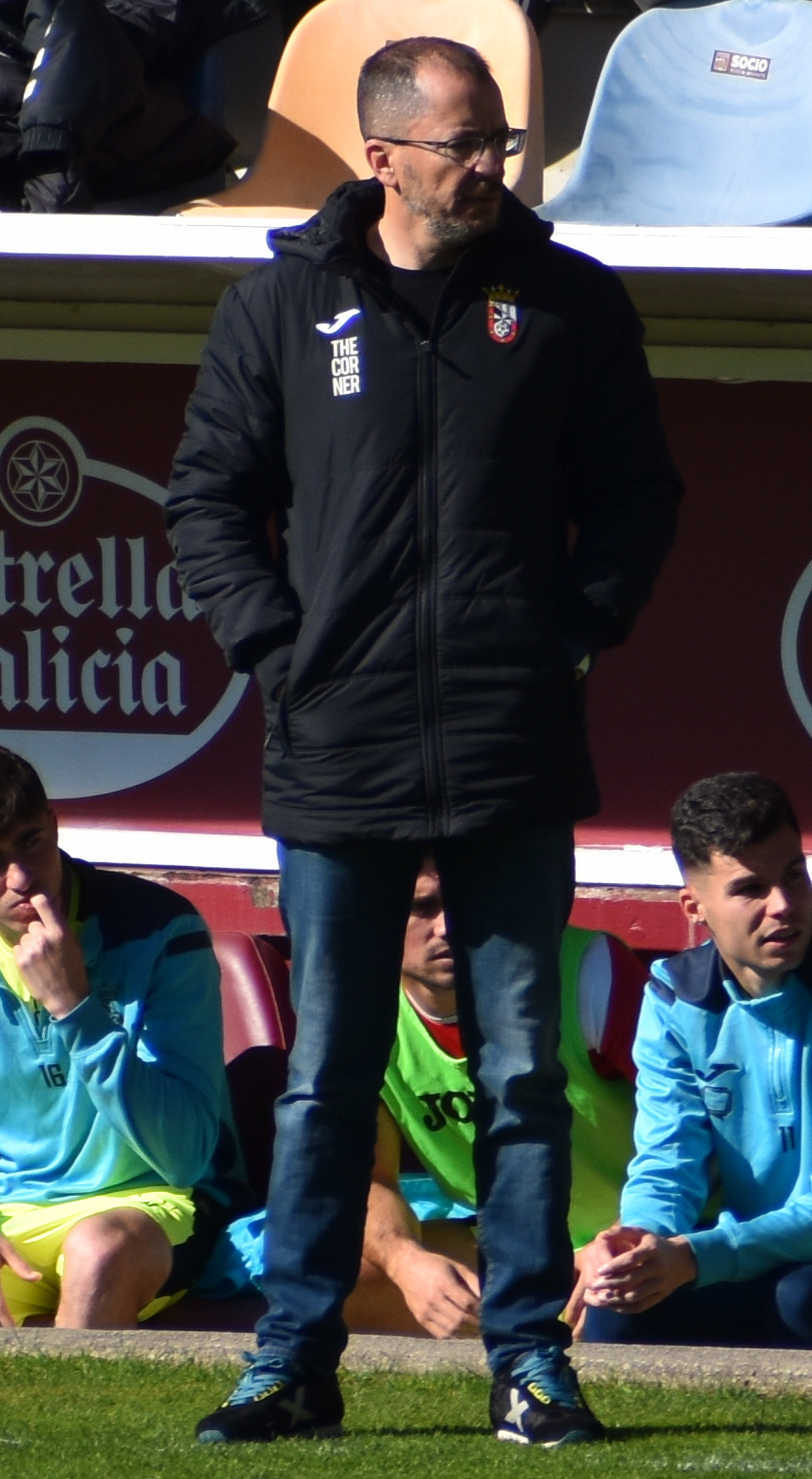
Romero managing Ceuta in 2023

On 20 September 2022, Romero returned to Ceuta, with the club now also in division three. The following 14 June, he renewed his contract for a further year.

Romero led Ceuta to a promotion to Segunda División after finishing first in their group in the 2024–25 campaign, and renewed his contract until 2027 on 11 August 2025. On his first professional match four days later, his side lost 3–0 to Real Valladolid.

On 13 July 2026, Romero further extended his link with the Caballas until 2029, but was dismissed on 7 November, after only one league win into the season.

== Personal life ==
Romero's son Adrián and younger brother Quique are also a footballers. The former is also a midfielder and worked under his father at Ceuta, and the latter was a forward who was groomed at Betis and played in La Liga with Recreativo de Huelva.

Since 2015, Gerena's municipal stadium is named Estadio José Juan Romero Gil, as an honour to his spell managing the club of the city.

== Managerial statistics ==
As of 8 November 2026

Managerial record by team and tenure
| Team | From | To | Record | | | | | Ref. |
| Team | From | To | P | W | D | L | Win % | Ref. |
|---|---|---|---|---|---|---|---|---|
| Gerena | 1 July 2006 | 23 February 2016 | 358 | 210 | 67 | 81 | 58.66 | |
| Betis B | 23 February 2016 | 5 June 2019 | 142 | 68 | 33 | 41 | 47.89 | |
| Ceuta | 14 June 2019 | 19 June 2021 | 56 | 23 | 20 | 13 | 41.07 | |
| Eldense | 19 June 2021 | 5 July 2022 | 37 | 17 | 11 | 9 | 45.95 | |
| Ceuta | 20 September 2022 | 7 November 2026 | 178 | 71 | 50 | 57 | 39.89 | |
| Total | | | 771 | 389 | 181 | 201 | 50.45 | — |
