= Melilla CD =

Melilla
- Full name: Melilla Club Deportivo
- Founded: 2014; 12 years ago
- Ground: La Espiguera; Melilla, Spain
- Capacity: 2,000
- President: Juan José Pedreño González
- Head coach: Nacho Aznar
- 2024–25: Primera Autonómica de Melilla, 4th of 5
Home colours	Away colours

Melilla Club Deportivo is a Spanish football team based in Melilla. Founded in 2014, they host their home games at Estadio La Espiguera, which has a capacity of 2,000 spectators.

== Season to season ==
Season	Tier	Division	Place	Copa del Rey
2014–15	5	1ª Aut.	2nd	
2015–16	5	1ª Aut.	2nd	
2016–17	5	1ª Aut.	7th	
2017–18	DNP			
2018–19	5	1ª Aut.	1st	
2019–20	4	3ª	18th	First round
2020–21	4	3ª	9th / 8th	
2021–22	6	1ª Aut.	2nd	
2022–23	6	1ª Aut.	2nd	Preliminary
2023–24	6	1ª Aut.	2nd	Preliminary
2024–25	6	1ª Aut.	4th	Preliminary

- 2 seasons in Tercera División
