= Aboubacar Bassinga =

Burkinabe footballer (born 2005)

Personal information
- Date of birth: 13 July 2005 (age 21)
- Place of birth: Abidjan, Ivory Coast
- Height: 1.78 m (5 ft 10 in)
- Position: Midfielder

Team information
- Current team: Las Palmas

Youth career
- 2020–2024: Las Palmas

Senior career*
Years	Team	Apps	(Gls)
2023–2024	Las Palmas C	2	(0)
2024–	Las Palmas	1	(0)
2024–2025	→ Mirandés (loan)	2	(0)
2025	Las Palmas B	10	(0)
2025–2026	→ Ceuta (loan)	26	(2)

International career^{‡}
2026–	Burkina Faso	1	(0)
- * Club domestic league appearances and goals as of 9 June 2026 ‡ National team caps and goals as of 19:28, 5 June 2026 (UTC)

Aboubacar Bassinga (born 13 July 2005) is a professional footballer who plays as a central midfielder for Spanish club UD Las Palmas. Born in the Ivory Coast, he plays for the Burkina Faso national team.

== Career ==
Born in Abidjan, Bassinga left his country at the age of 14 after boarding a boat; he intended to meet his uncle in France, but ran into authorities upon arriving in Arguineguín on 13 February 2020. He then joined the youth sides of UD Las Palmas, but had to wait until September 2023, when he turned 18, to start to play a competition for the club.

On 7 January 2024, before even having appeared for the reserves, Bassinga made his first team – and professional – debut, starting in a 2–0 away loss to rivals CD Tenerife, for the season's Copa del Rey. He made his La Liga debut on 16 August 2024, replacing Alberto Moleiro late into a 2–2 home draw against Sevilla FC. Fourteen days later, he moved to Segunda División side CD Mirandés on a one-year loan deal.

On 3 February 2025, Bassinga's loan with the Jabatos was cut short, and he was assigned to the B-side in Tercera Federación. On 18 July, he was loaned to AD Ceuta FC also in the second division, for one year.

== International career ==
Born in the Ivory Coast, Bassinga is of Burkinabe descent. He was called up to the Burkina Faso national team for a set of friendlies in June 2026.
