= AD Ceuta FC B =

Spanish football team

Ceuta B
- Full name: Asociación Deportiva Ceuta Fútbol Club B
- Founded: 2012
- Ground: Alfonso Murube, Ceuta, Spain
- Capacity: 6,500
- President: Luhay Hamido
- Head coach: Polaco
- League: Tercera Federación – Group 10
- 2025–26: Tercera Federación – Group 10, 5th of 18
Home colours	Away colours	Third colours

Asociación Deportiva Ceuta B is a Spanish football team based in the autonomous city of Ceuta. Founded in 2012, they are the reserve team of AD Ceuta FC, play in Tercera Federación – Group 10, and hold home matches at Estadio Alfonso Murube, with a capacity of 6,500.

== History ==
Founded in 2012 along as Club Atlético de Ceuta, Ceuta B was a replacement to dissolved AD Ceuta B, and was renamed to AD Ceuta FC B in 2013 after the first team's renaming. In June 2021, the club achieved a first-ever promotion to Tercera División RFEF, after leading their group in the Regional Preferente.

== Season to season ==
Season	Tier	Division	Place
2012–13	5	Reg. Pref.	2nd
2013–14	5	Reg. Pref.	2nd
2014–15	5	Reg. Pref.	2nd
2015–16	5	Reg. Pref.	3rd
2016–17	5	Reg. Pref.	1st
2017–18	5	Reg. Pref.	1st
2018–19	5	Reg. Pref.	4th
2019–20	5	Reg. Pref.	2nd
2020–21	5	Reg. Pref.	1st
2021–22	5	3ª RFEF	9th
2022–23	5	3ª Fed.	11th
2023–24	5	3ª Fed.	5th
2024–25	5	3ª Fed.	10th
2025–26	5	3ª Fed.	5th
2026–27	5	3ª Fed.	

- 6 seasons in Tercera Federación/Tercera División RFEF

== Current squad ==
As of 4 October 2026

Note: Flags indicate national team as defined under FIFA eligibility rules; some limited exceptions apply. Players may hold more than one non-FIFA nationality.

No.	Pos.	Nation	Player
1	GK	ESP	Antonio Rodin
2	DF	ESP	Sergio Veces
3	DF	ESP	Pablo Vílchez
4	DF	COL	Magno Murillo
5	DF	ESP	Daniel Mas
6	MF	ESP	Miguel Vives
7	FW	ESP	Nico Pereira
8	FW	ESP	Mario Naranjo
10	FW	ESP	Pepe Sánchez
11	FW	ESP	Pelayo García
13	GK	FRA	Ayoub Akabou
14	MF	ESP	Jon Ander Larrea
15	DF	GER	Stevan Tasic

No.	Pos.	Nation	Player
16	MF	SEN	Bodian Yaya
17	MF	NGR	Goodluck Eze
18	MF	ESP	Abraham Bueno
19	FW	ESP	Paco Fernández
20	FW	ESP	Adri Rueda
23	DF	ESP	David Gómez
24	MF	ESP	Juanan Miñón
25	FW	GHA	William Owusu
26	MF	ESP	Adri Romero
28	MF	ESP	Adán Villalba
29	FW	ESP	Yeyo
31	GK	ESP	Nel González

=== Reserve team ===
Note: Flags indicate national team as defined under FIFA eligibility rules; some limited exceptions apply. Players may hold more than one non-FIFA nationality.

No.	Pos.	Nation	Player
27	MF	ESP	Tafito
30	DF	ESP	Josemi Gómez
32	MF	ESP	Sulaiman Afallah

No.	Pos.	Nation	Player
33	FW	ESP	Víctor Fabio
34	DF	ESP	Juan Ramírez
36	DF	ESP	Manuel Doblas
