= Divisiones Regionales de Fútbol in Ceuta and Melilla =

The Divisiones Regionales de Fútbol in Ceuta and Melilla, both at Level 6 of the Spanish football pyramid:

- Preferente de Ceuta, 1 Group, organized by Ceuta Football Federation
- Primera Autonómica de Melilla, 1 Group, organized by Melilla Football Federation

== League chronology ==
Timeline - Ceuta

Timeline - Melilla

== Preferente of Ceuta ==
Preferente de Ceuta
- Founded: 1931
- Country: Spain
- Number of clubs: Variable
- Level on pyramid: 6
- Promotion to: 3ª Federación – Group 10
- Relegation to: none
- Website: Official website

The Preferente de Ceuta stands at the sixth level of Spanish football and is the only league played exclusively within the autonomous city of Ceuta. At the end of the season, the top four clubs advance to promotion playoff. The winner plays the champion of the Primera Autonómica de Melilla for promotion to the Tercera Federación (to Group 10, played by teams from Western Andalusia). Federation rules allow the playoff winner to be promoted directly if there is no Ceuta club in the Tercera Federación.

=== 2026–27 teams ===
Club
- Betis de Hadú
- Ceuta 6 de Junio
- Inter de Ceuta
- La Street
- Principe Este
- Sporting Atlético
- Sporting de Ceuta

=== Champions ===
Season	Winner
2010–11	Ceuta United
2011–12	Hilal Deportivo
2012–13	Sporting de Ceuta
2013–14	Ceuta CFB
2014–15	Ramón y Cajal
2015–16	Ramón y Cajal
2016–17	Ceuta B
2017–18	Ceuta B
2018–19	Ramón y Cajal
2019–20	AUGC Deportiva
2020–21	Ceuta B
2021–22	Ceuta 6 de Junio
2022–23	Ceuta 6 de Junio
2023–24	Ceuta 6 de Junio
2024–25	Sporting de Ceuta
2025–26	Ceuta 6 de Junio

== Primera Autonómica de Melilla ==
Primera Autonómica de Melilla
- Founded: 1931
- Country: Spain
- Number of clubs: Variable
- Level on pyramid: 6
- Promotion to: 3ª Federación – Group 9
- Relegation to: none
- Website: Official website

The Primera Autonómica de Melilla stands at the sixth level of Spanish football and is the only league played exclusively within the autonomous city of Melilla. The champion competes against the playoff winner from the Regional Preferente de Ceuta for promotion to the Tercera Federación (to Group 9, played by teams from Eastern Andalusia). Federation rules allows the champion to be promoted directly if there is no Melilla club in the Tercera Federación.

=== 2025–26 teams ===
Club
- Atlético Melilla
- Boomerang
- Gimnástico Melilla
- UD Melilla C

=== Champions ===
Season	Winner
2010–11	Peña Real Madrid Melilla
2011–12	UD Melilla B
2012–13	Cabrerizas
2013–14	Atlético Melilla
2014–15	River Melilla
2015–16	Melistar FS
2016–17	CD Melistar
2017–18	River Melilla
2018–19	Melilla CD
2019–20	Rusadir
2020–21	Intergym Melilla
2021–22	Huracán Melilla
2022–23	Atlético Melilla
2023–24	River Melilla
2024–25	UD Melilla B
2025–26	Atlético Melilla
