= AD Ceuta FC =

Association football club in Spain

Ceuta
- Full name: Agrupación Deportiva Ceuta Fútbol Club
- Nickname: Caballas (Mackerels)
- Founded: 9 July 1956; 70 years ago as Club Atlético de Ceuta
- Ground: Estadio Alfonso Murube
- Capacity: 6,500
- President: Luhay Hamido
- Head coach: José Juan Romero
- League: Segunda División
- 2025–26: Segunda División, 11th of 22
- Website: adceutafc.com
Home colours	Away colours	Third colours

Agrupación Deportiva Ceuta Fútbol Club is a Spanish football club based in the autonomous city of Ceuta. Founded in 1956, it plays in Segunda División, the second tier of Spanish football league system.

== History ==
The club was found in 1956, after a merger between Sociedad Deportiva Ceuta and Atlético Tetuán, under the name of Club Atlético de Ceuta. It eventually took the place of Tetuán in Segunda División, remaining in the category for six campaigns.

After a one-year spell in Tercera División, Atlético Ceuta returned to the second level and enjoyed a further five seasons before suffering relegation in 1968. The club subsequently fluctuated between the fourth and fifth levels, staying in the former for a short amount of time.

After being promoted to the fourth division in 2012 due to an administrative relegation, Atlético Ceuta tried to merge with AD Ceuta. However, due to the latter's high debts, the club remained under the same name, but with the staff and players of the Agrupación Deportiva.

In 2013, the club was officially named Agrupación Deportiva Ceuta Fútbol Club, inheriting AD Ceuta's colours and logo.

After the 2020–21 Tercera División season, Ceuta won with an added-time goal in the playoff final against Xerez CD to win promotion to the new Segunda División RFEF, albeit still the fourth tier of Spanish football. The team stayed in that league for only one season, achieving promotion to the Primera Federación with a 2–0 playoff final win away to AD Unión Adarve; this put them in the third tier for the first time since 1970.

Manager Chus Trujillo, who oversaw the promotion, was dismissed on 19 September 2022 having lost all of the first four games of the 2022–23 Primera Federación season. He was replaced by José Juan Romero in his second spell at the club. The team defeated UD Ibiza of the Segunda División (3–2) and Elche CF of La Liga (1–0) to reach a best-ever last 16 of the Copa del Rey in the same season; there, they lost 5–0 at home to FC Barcelona. Striker Rodri finished the season with 20 goals, the most in the league.

In the 2024–25 campaign, Ceuta won their Primera Federación group and gained promotion to the second division 57 years since their last appearance, after defeating Fuenlabrada on 11 May 2025; it will also be the first time the city of Ceuta will have a representative in the category in 45 years.

=== Club background ===
- Ceuta Sport Club — (1932–41); renamed in 1941 to Sociedad Deportiva Ceuta
- Sociedad Deportiva Ceuta — (1941–56); in 1956 merged with the Spanish elements of Club Atlético Tetuán to form Club Atlético de Ceuta

=== Club naming ===
- Club Atlético de Ceuta (1956–92)
- Ceuta Atlético Club (1992-94)
- Club Atlético de Ceuta (1994-2012)
- Asociación Deportiva Atlético de Ceuta (2012-13)
- Agrupación Deportiva Ceuta Fútbol Club (2013–present)

==== Other clubs from Ceuta ====
- Club Imperio de Ceuta Sociedad Deportiva — (1958–)
- Agrupación Deportiva Ceuta — (1969–91)
- Club Ceutí Atlético – (1996–97)
- Asociación Deportiva Ceuta (1997–2012)

== Season to season ==
=== As Club Atlético de Ceuta ===
Season	Tier	Division	Place	Copa del Rey
1956–57	2	2ª	8th	
1957–58	2	2ª	13th	
1958–59	2	2ª	11th	First round
1959–60	2	2ª	8th	Round of 32
1960–61	2	2ª	2nd	First round
1961–62	2	2ª	15th	Round of 32
1962–63	3	3ª	1st	
1963–64	2	2ª	14th	First round
1964–65	2	2ª	5th	First round
1965–66	2	2ª	14th	First round
1966–67	2	2ª	13th	Round of 32
1967–68	2	2ª	7th	First round
1968–69	3	3ª	4th	
1969–70	3	3ª	15th	First round
1970–71	4	Reg. Pref.	6th	
1971–72	4	Reg. Pref.	8th	
1972–73	4	Reg. Pref.	2nd	
1973–74	4	Reg. Pref.	4th	
1974–75	4	Reg. Pref.	4th	
1975–76	4	Reg. Pref.	2nd	

Season	Tier	Division	Place	Copa del Rey
1976–77	4	Reg. Pref.	1st	
1977–78	4	3ª	20th	First round
1978–79	5	Reg. Pref.	3rd	
1979–80	5	Reg. Pref.	4th	
1980–81	5	Reg. Pref.	2nd	
1981–82	5	Reg. Pref.	1st	
1982–83	5	Reg. Pref.	4th	
1983–84	5	Reg. Pref.	4th	
1984–85	5	Reg. Pref.	1st	
1985–86	5	Reg. Pref.	3rd	
1986–87	5	Reg. Pref.	7th	
1987–88	5	Reg. Pref.	4th	
1988–89	5	Reg. Pref.	1st	
1989–90	4	3ª	20th	
1990–91	5	Reg. Pref.	1st	
1991–92	4	3ª	20th	
1992–93	5	Reg. Pref.	1st	
1993–94	4	3ª	5th	
1994–95	4	3ª	20th	
1995–96	5	Reg. Pref.	3rd	

Season	Tier	Division	Place	Copa del Rey
1996–97	5	Reg. Pref.	3rd	
1997–98	5	Reg. Pref.	5th	
1998–99	5	Reg. Pref.	2nd	
1999–2000	5	Reg. Pref.	2nd	
2000–01	5	Reg. Pref.	3rd	
2001–02	5	Reg. Pref.	7th	
2002–03	5	Reg. Pref.	7th	

Season	Tier	Division	Place	Copa del Rey
2003–04	5	Reg. Pref.	8th	
2004–05	5	Reg. Pref.	2nd	
2005–06	5	Reg. Pref.	1st	
2006–07	4	3ª	18th	
2007–11	DNP			
2011–12	5	Reg. Pref.	2nd	
2012–13	4	3ª	5th	

- 11 seasons in Segunda División
- 10 seasons in Tercera División

=== As Agrupación Deportiva Ceuta Fútbol Club ===
Season	Tier	Division	Place	Copa del Rey
2013–14	4	3ª	4th	
2014–15	4	3ª	5th	
2015–16	4	3ª	6th	
2016–17	4	3ª	9th	
2017–18	4	3ª	2nd	
2018–19	4	3ª	2nd	First round
2019–20	4	3ª	5th	Second round
2020–21	4	3ª	3rd / 6th	
2021–22	4	2ª RFEF	4th	
2022–23	3	1ª Fed.	12th	Round of 16
2023–24	3	1ª Fed.	5th	
2024–25	3	1ª Fed.	1st	Second round
2025–26	2	2ª	11th	Second round
2026–27	2	2ª		

- 2 seasons in Segunda División
- 3 seasons in Primera Federación
- 1 season in Segunda División RFEF
- 8 seasons in Tercera División

== Players ==
=== Current squad ===
As of 7 September 2026

Note: Flags indicate national team as defined under FIFA eligibility rules; some limited exceptions apply. Players may hold more than one non-FIFA nationality.

No.	Pos.	Nation	Player
1	GK	ESP	Pedro López
2	DF	ESP	Toni Abad
3	DF	ESP	José Matos
4	DF	ESP	Albert Caparrós (captain)
5	DF	ESP	Adrián Lapeña
6	DF	ESP	Carlos Hernández
7	MF	ESP	Álex Camacho
8	MF	ESP	Kuki Zalazar
9	FW	ESP	Jordi Escobar
10	MF	ESP	Marino Illescas
11	MF	ESP	Cedric Teguia
13	GK	ESP	Guillermo Vallejo
14	MF	FRA	Yann Bodiger
15	MF	ESP	Joaquín González (on loan from Cádiz)

No.	Pos.	Nation	Player
16	DF	ESP	Redru
17	MF	GHA	Mawuli Mensah
18	DF	ESP	Álex Petxarroman
19	MF	ARM	Edgar Sevikyan (on loan from Ferencváros)
20	MF	ESP	Ale Meléndez
21	FW	NGR	Kenneth Mamah
22	MF	CIV	Kialy Abdoul Kone
23	MF	MAR	Anuar Tuhami
26	MF	VEN	Arick Betancourt
27	FW	ESP	Umaru Konare (on loan from Elche)
29	FW	MAR	Omar Sadik (on loan from Espanyol)
30	MF	ESP	Josema
32	MF	NGR	Gabriel Okoro

=== Reserve team ===
Note: Flags indicate national team as defined under FIFA eligibility rules; some limited exceptions apply. Players may hold more than one non-FIFA nationality.

No.	Pos.	Nation	Player
28	MF	ESP	Abraham Bueno
31	MF	ESP	Adrián Romero
33	DF	COL	Magno Murillo

No.	Pos.	Nation	Player
34	DF	ESP	Daniel Mas
36	DF	ESP	Josemi

=== Out on loan ===
Note: Flags indicate national team as defined under FIFA eligibility rules; some limited exceptions apply. Players may hold more than one non-FIFA nationality.

No.	Pos.	Nation	Player
—	FW	ESP	Iomar Vidal (at La Nucía until 30 June 2027)

== Current technical staff ==
Position	Staff
Manager	(Spain) José Juan Romero
Assistant manager	(Spain) Antonio José
Fitness coach	(Spain) Antonio Pasamar (Spain) Mané
Delegate	(Spain) José Luis Pérez Viruel
Technical assistant	(Spain) Raúl Alcázar
Goalkeeping coach	(Spain) Mohamed Reda
Nutritionist	(Spain) Victoria Ríos

Last updated: 16 August 2025
Source: AD Ceuta FC (in Spanish)
