= 2026–27 Copa del Rey =

Tournament details
- Country: Spain
- Date: 26 September 2026 – 24 April 2027
- Teams: 126

The 2026–27 Copa del Rey is the 125th staging of the Copa del Rey (including two seasons where two rival editions were played). The winners are assured a place in the 2027–28 UEFA Europa League league phase. Both the winners and the runners-up will qualify for the four-team 2028 Supercopa de España.

Real Sociedad are the defending champions, having beaten Atlético Madrid in the final of the previous edition.

The final will be held at La Cartuja in Seville in April 2027.

As across Spain, match times up to 25 October 2026 and from 29 March 2027 are CEST (UTC+2). Times on interim ("winter") days are CET (UTC+1). Matches played in the Canary Islands use the WET (UTC±00:00).

== Schedule and format ==
Round	Draw date	Date	Fixtures	Clubs	Format details
Preliminary round	10 September 2026	26–27 September 2026	20	126 → 116	New entries: Clubs qualified through the 2025–26 sixth tier. Opponents seeding: Teams faced each other according to proximity criteria. Knock-out tournament type: Double match.
Preliminary round	10 September 2026	3–4 October 2026	20	126 → 116	New entries: Clubs qualified through the 2025–26 sixth tier. Opponents seeding: Teams faced each other according to proximity criteria. Knock-out tournament type: Double match.
First round	5 October 2026	27 October – 18 November 2026	56	116 → 60	New entries: All qualified teams except for the four participants in the Supercopa de España. Opponents seeding: Teams from lowest divisions face La Liga teams according to proximity criteria. Local team seeding: Matches are played at home stadiums of teams in lower divisions. Knock-out tournament type: Single match.
Second round	23 November 2026	2 December 2026	28	60 → 32	Opponents seeding: Teams from lowest divisions face La Liga teams. Local team seeding: Matches are played at home stadiums of teams in lower divisions. Knock-out tournament type: Single match.
Round of 32	December 2026	16 December 2026	16	32 → 16	New entries: Clubs participating in the Supercopa de España enter at this stage. Opponents seeding: Teams from lowest divisions face Supercopa and La Liga teams, respectively. Local team seeding: Matches are played at home stadiums of teams in lower divisions. Knock-out tournament type: Single match.
Round of 16	December 2026	6 January 2027	8	16 → 8	Opponents seeding: Teams from lowest divisions face Supercopa and La Liga teams, respectively. Local team seeding: Matches are played at home stadiums of teams in lower divisions. Knock-out tournament type: Single match.
Quarter-finals	January 2027	13 January 2027	4	8 → 4	Opponents seeding: Luck of the draw. Local team seeding: Matches are played at home stadiums of teams in lower divisions. Knock-out tournament type: Single match.
Semi-finals	January 2027	10 February 2027	2	4 → 2	Opponents seeding: Luck of the draw. Local team seeding: Luck of the draw. Knock-out tournament type: Double match.
Semi-finals	January 2027	3 March 2027	2	4 → 2	Opponents seeding: Luck of the draw. Local team seeding: Luck of the draw. Knock-out tournament type: Double match.
Final	January 2027	24 April 2027	1	2 → 1	Single match at Estadio de La Cartuja, Seville. Both teams qualify for the 2028 Supercopa de España. UEFA Europa League qualification: winners qualify for the 2027–28 UEFA Europa League group stage.

Notes

- Matches/ties ending in a draw will be decided in extra time and, if still level, by a penalty shoot-out.

== Qualified teams ==
The following teams qualified for the competition. Reserve teams were not allowed to enter.

La Liga; All 20 teams of the 2025–26 season	Segunda División; All 21 non-reserve teams of the 2025–26 season	Primera Federación; Top five non-reserve teams of each group of the 2025–26 season, plus the non-reserve team with the best coefficient not already qualified	Segunda Federación; Top five non-reserve teams of the five groups of the 2025–26 season	Tercera Federación; The best non-reserve teams plus the best seven non-reserve runners-up of each one of the eighteen groups of the 2025–26 season	Copa Federación; The four semi-finalists of the 2026 Copa Federación de España	Regional leagues The best non-promoted teams of the twenty groups of the sixth tier in the 2025–26 season
Alavés; Athletic Bilbao; Atlético Madrid (Note: Atlético Madrid, Real Sociedad, Barcelona and Real Madrid will join the tournament in the round of 32 as participants of the Supercopa de España.); Barcelona; Celta Vigo; Elche; Espanyol; Getafe; Girona; Levante; Mallorca; Osasuna; Oviedo; Rayo Vallecano; Real Betis; Real Madrid; Real Sociedad^{TH}; Sevilla; Valencia; Villarreal	Albacete; Almería; Andorra; Burgos; Cádiz; Castellón; Ceuta; Córdoba; Cultural Leonesa; Deportivo A Coruña; Eibar; Granada; Huesca; Las Palmas; Leganés; Málaga; Mirandés; Racing Santander; Sporting Gijón; Valladolid; Zaragoza	Antequera; Barakaldo; Cartagena; Eldense; Europa; Sabadell; Tenerife; Ponferradina; Pontevedra; Unionistas (Note: Qualified as the club with the best coefficient in the league not already qualified, as Real Sociedad B were unable to compete in the cup.); Zamora	Águilas; Alcalá; Alcoyano; Amorebieta; Atlético Baleares; Ávila; Conquense; Coria; Coruxo; Extremadura; Gimnástica Segoviana; Jaén; UD Logroñés; Minera; Numancia; UD Ourense; Poblense; Rayo Majadahonda; Real Unión; Reus FCR; San Sebastián de los Reyes; Sant Andreu; Tudelano; Utebo; Xerez	Arosa; Atlético Paso; Atlético Tordesillas; Badajoz; Calamocha; Calvo Sotelo; Castellonense; Cieza; Ciudad de Lucena; Covadonga; Cuarte; Don Benito; Gimnástica Torrelavega; Guijuelo; Laredo; Llanera; Manacor; Manresa; Mijas-Las Lagunas; Pamplona; Peña Sport; Portugalete; Trival Valderas; Tarancón; Varea	Navalcarnero; Recreativo; Salamanca; Sestao River	Anaitasuna; Atlético Calatayud; Atlético Melilla; Atlético Unión Güímar; Auriense; Baztán; Ceuta 6 de Junio; Lebrijana; Maracena; Noja; Pinatar; Prat; Ribadesella; San José; Sant Rafel; Sporting de Alcázar; Sporting Hortaleza; Talayuela; Tavernes de la Valldigna; Tedeón

== Preliminary round ==
Location of teams in preliminary round
Red: Group 1
Green: Group 2
Purple: Group 3
Orange: Group 4

=== Draw ===
Teams were divided into four groups according to geographical criteria.

Group 1	Group 2	Group 3	Group 4
Anaitasuna; Auriense; Noja; Ribadesella; San José; Tedeón	Atlético Calatayud; Baztán; Prat; Sant Rafel	Atlético Melilla; Ceuta 6 de Junio; Lebrijana; Maracena; Pinatar; Tavernes de la Valldigna	Atlético Unión Güímar; Sporting de Alcázar; Sporting Hortaleza; Talayuela

=== Summary ===
Team 1	Agg.	Team 2	1st leg	2nd leg
Anaitasuna	10–2	Tedeón	5–0	5–2
Auriense	2–1	San José	2–0	0–1
Ribadesella	2–1	Noja	1–0	1–1
Atlético Calatayud	4–1	Baztán	2–0	2–1
Sant Rafel	1–10	Prat	1–5	0–5
Maracena	1–1 (2–4 p)	Tavernes de la Valldigna	1–1	0–0 (a.e.t.)
Lebrijana	7–1	Ceuta 6 de Junio	5–0	2–1
Pinatar	11–0	Atlético Melilla	8–0	3–0
Sporting Hortaleza	4–3	Atlético Unión Güímar	1–0	3–3 (a.e.t.)
Talayuela	1–3	Sporting de Alcázar	1–2	0–1

=== First leg ===
26 September 2026	Anaitasuna	5–0	Tedeón	Azkoitia
18:00	Pastri 25', 70'; Hicham 45+2', 52'; Aramendi 56'	Report		Stadium: Txerloia; Referee: Juan Velasco Fuentes

26 September 2026	Atlético Calatayud	2–0	Baztán	Calatayud
18:00	Blasco 4', 80'	Report		Stadium: San Íñigo; Referee: José Jareño Gil

26 September 2026	Lebrijana	5–0	Ceuta 6 de Junio	Lebrija
18:00	Josemi 9', 35', 40'; Parrales 50'; Valdez 72'	Report		Stadium: Municipal; Referee: Mario Carlos García Sosa

26 September 2026	Ribadesella	1–0	Noja	Ribadesella
19:00	Santoveña 90+4'	Report		Stadium: Oreyana; Referee: Iván Carrillo Checkhov

26 September 2026	Pinatar	8–0	Atlético Melilla	San Pedro del Pinatar
20:00	Moha 15' (pen.), 90' (pen.); Vilches 22'; Chipi 34'; Kerru 40'; Webb 59', 80'	Report		Stadium: José Antonio Pérez; Referee: Miguel Díaz-Portales Ruiz

27 September 2026	Auriense	2–0	San José	Ourense
12:00	Méndez 34'; Fernández 87'	Report		Stadium: Campo de Oira; Referee: Jaime Ruiz Álvarez

27 September 2026	Sporting Hortaleza	1–0	Atlético Unión Güímar	Madrid
12:00	Alfredo 80'	Report		Stadium: Polideportivo Municipal Sporting de Hortaleza; Referee: Nicolas Suárez Larrén

27 September 2026	Sant Rafel	1–5	Prat	Sant Rafel de sa Creu
16:00	Martínez 26'	Report	Kim Keon-woo 15'; Reinke 39', 52'; Plaza 42' (pen.); Ino 84'	Stadium: Municipal; Referee: Adrián Goñi Muiños

27 September 2026	Talayuela	1–2	Sporting de Alcázar	Talayuela
17:30	Yann Junior 35'	Report	Contento 21'; Abengózar 75' (pen.)	Stadium: Ciudad Deportiva Rodrigo Sánchez; Referee: Alejandro Torrano López

27 September 2026	Maracena	1–1	Tavernes de la Valldigna	Maracena
18:00	Falin 45+1' (pen.)	Report	Prats 17'	Stadium: Ciudad Deportiva de Maracena; Referee: Antonio Pozo Fernández

=== Second leg ===
3 October 2026	Baztán	1–2 (1–4 agg.)	Atlético Calatayud	Elizondo
17:30	Zoko 11'	Report	Vinuesa 1'; Martínez 20'	Stadium: Giltxaurdi; Referee: Javier Gutierrez Ruiz

3 October 2026	Tedeón	2–5 (2–10 agg.)	Anaitasuna	Navarrete
18:00	Sánchez 31'; Dávila 39'	Report	Errazu 29'; Aramendi 45+2'; Zubizarreta 50'; Díaz 73'; Juaristi 75'	Stadium: San Miguel; Referee: Andrea López Méndez

3 October 2026	Ceuta 6 de Junio	1–2 (1–7 agg.)	Lebrijana	Ceuta
18:00	Boumedian 70'	Report	Josemi 14', 38'	Stadium: José Martínez Pirri; Referee: Jose Manuel Sabido Serrano

4 October 2026	San José	1–0 (1–2 agg.)	Auriense	Soria
16:00	Antolín 55'	Report		Stadium: San Juan de Garray; Referee: David Martinez Bachiller

4 October 2026	Noja	1–1 (1–2 agg.)	Ribadesella	Noja
16:00	Miguel 41'	Report	Jandro 4'	Stadium: La Caseta; Referee: Izaskun Muñoz Echeverria

4 October 2026	Sporting de Alcázar	1–0 (3–1 agg.)	Talayuela	Alcázar de San Juan
17:30	Abengózar 45' (pen.)	Report		Stadium: Campo de Fútbol Manuel Delgado Meco; Referee: Javier Clemente Martinez

4 October 2026	Tavernes de la Valldigna	0–0 (a.e.t.) (1–1 agg.) (4–2 p)	Maracena	Tavernes de la Valldigna
18:00		Report		Stadium: Municipal; Referee: Adrian Corbelle Huelin
	Penalties
	Martínez (penalty scored); Seral (penalty scored); Alberola (penalty scored); Jordi (penalty missed); Hayrapetyan (penalty scored)		(penalty scored) Neskes; (penalty missed) Osuna; (penalty scored) Sellés; (penalty missed) Román

4 October 2026	Atlético Melilla	0–3 (0–11 agg.)	Pinatar	Melilla
19:00		Report	Hicham 13', 53'; Vilches 76'	Stadium: La Espiguera; Referee: Manuel Canton Martos

11 October 2026	Atlético Unión Güímar	3–3 (a.e.t.) (3–4 agg.)	Sporting Hortaleza	Puerto de la Cruz
13:00 WET	Said 18', 32'; Denzel 50'	Report	Alhambra 47', 104' (pen.); El Moudden 72'	Stadium: Estadio del Peñón; Referee: Rafael Aguilar Prat
Note: Originally scheduled to 4 October 2026, the match was postponed due to incidents before the match.

11 October 2026	Prat	5–0 (10–1 agg.)	Sant Rafel	El Prat de Llobregat
16:00	Rivas 10'; Buyreu 13'; Kim Keon-woo 14'; Archs 48'; Adán 73'	Report		Stadium: CEM Sagnier; Referee: Ignacio Garcia Reyes
Note: Originally scheduled to 4 October 2026, the match was postponed due to the visitors' "inability to travel" due to weather conditions.

== First round ==
The first round will be played by 112 of the 116 qualified teams, with the exceptions being the four participants of the 2027 Supercopa de España.

This first round remains a single match, but a new criteria of geographical proximity was created to define which teams would face each other.

A total of 56 matches will be played between 27 October and 18 November 2026. All matches scheduled to occur on 28 October were postponed due to a train collision in Urda, Toledo. The matches originally scheduled for between 3 and 5 November were postponed once again as a mark of mourning for the death of Tenerife player Jesús de Miguel.

=== Draw ===
The draw for the first round was held on 5 October 2026. Teams were divided into four pots.

Pot 1 Group 1	Pot 2 Group 2	Pot 3 Group 3	Pot 4 Group 4
Celta Vigo; Deportivo A Coruña; Racing Santander; Burgos; Oviedo; Sporting Gijón; Valladolid; Cultural Leonesa; Mirandés; UD Ourense; Ponferradina; Pontevedra; Unionistas; Zamora; Arosa; Atlético Tordesillas; Ávila; Coruxo; Gimnástica Segoviana; Gimnástica Torrelavega; Llanera; Numancia; Covadonga; Guijuelo; Laredo; Salamanca; Auriense; Ribadesella	Alavés; Athletic Bilbao; Espanyol; Osasuna; Andorra; Eibar; Girona; Sabadell; Barakaldo; Europa; Huesca; UD Logroñés; Real Unión; Sant Andreu; Zaragoza; Amorebieta; Calamocha; Manresa; Peña Sport; Portugalete; Reus FCR; Tudelano; Utebo; Cuarte; Pamplona; Varea; Sestao River; Anaitasuna; Atlético Calatayud; Prat	Elche; Levante; Málaga; Valencia; Villarreal; Albacete; Almería; Castellón; Ceuta; Eldense; Granada; Mallorca; Águilas; Antequera; Cartagena; Jaén; Alcoyano; Atlético Baleares; Calvo Sotelo; Castellonense; Cieza; Conquense; Mijas-Las Lagunas; Minera; Poblense; Manacor; Tarancón; Pinatar; Sporting de Alcázar; Tavernes de la Valldigna	Getafe; Rayo Vallecano; Real Betis; Sevilla; Cádiz; Córdoba; Las Palmas; Leganés; Tenerife; Coria; Extremadura; Rayo Majadahonda; Alcalá; Atlético Paso; Badajoz; Don Benito; Ciudad de Lucena; San Sebastián de los Reyes; Xerez; Trival Valderas; Navalcarnero; Recreativo; Lebrijana; Sporting Hortaleza

=== Group 1 ===
27 October 2026	Atlético Tordesillas (4)	3–3 (a.e.t.) (2–4 p)	Mirandés (3)	Tordesillas
20:00	Chatún 5', 29'; Conejo 48'	Report	Riki 69'; Arambarri 81'; González 90+5'	Stadium: Las Salinas
	Penalties
	Bueno (penalty scored); Manja (penalty missed); Castaño (penalty missed); Conejo (penalty scored)		(penalty scored) Verde; (penalty scored) González; (penalty missed) Rodríguez; (penalty scored) Navarro; (penalty scored) Dela

27 October 2026	Gimnástica Segoviana (4)	0–1	Cultural Leonesa (3)	Segovia
20:00		Report	Gnamadio 31' (o.g.)	Stadium: La Albuera

27 October 2026	Llanera (4)	1–1 (a.e.t.) (3–5 p)	Ponferradina (3)	Mieres (Note: Llanera did not play the match in their main stadium Pepe Quimarán, Posada de Llanera, as it did not meet the broadcasting requirements.)
20:00	Longo 82'	Report	Faye 39'	Stadium: Hermanos Antuña
	Penalties
	Calvo (penalty scored); Mvondo (penalty missed); Busto (penalty scored); Turmo (penalty scored)		(penalty scored) Muñoz; (penalty scored) Aranda; (penalty scored) Andújar; (penalty scored) Slavy; (penalty scored) Valle

27 October 2026	Arosa (4)	2–0	Pontevedra (3)	Vilagarcía de Arousa
21:00	Remeseiro 55'; Palmás 66'	Report		Stadium: A Lomba

29 October 2026	Numancia (4)	3–3 (a.e.t.) (4–2 p)	Oviedo (2)	Soria
18:00	Aranzabe 42'; León 57'; Jony 86'		Ișfan 74'; Goti 76', 89'	Stadium: Los Pajaritos
	Penalties
	Roldán (penalty scored); Jony (penalty scored); Charlez (penalty scored); Lauture (penalty scored)		(penalty missed) Sáenz; (penalty missed) Reina; (penalty scored) Morales; (penalty scored) Villahermosa
Note: Originally scheduled to 28 October 2026, the match was postponed due to a train collision in Urda.

29 October 2026	Coruxo (4)	0–2	Zamora (3)	Vigo
19:00		Report	Mascaró 8'; Hidalgo 90'	Stadium: O Vao
Note: Originally scheduled to 28 October 2026, the match was postponed due to a train collision in Urda.

29 October 2026	Covadonga (5)	0–1	Valladolid (2)	Pola de Siero (Note: Covadonga did not play the match in their main stadium Estadio Álvarez Rabanal, Oviedo, as it did not meet the broadcasting requirements.)
20:00		Report	Van Duiven 12'	Stadium: El Bayu
Note: Originally scheduled to 28 October 2026, the match was postponed due to a train collision in Urda.

29 October 2026	Guijuelo (5)	1–3	Sporting Gijón (2)	Guijuelo
20:00	Vázquez 38' (o.g.)	Report	Otero 62'; Prendes 63'; Conde 90+3'	Stadium: Estadio Municipal

29 October 2026	Laredo (5)	2–4	Burgos (2)	Santoña (Note: Laredo did not play the match in their main stadium Campo de Fútbol San Lorenzo, Laredo, due to problems with the stadium renovation works.)
20:00	Carral 48'; Primo 72'	Report	Gragera 21'; Dadie 67', 90+3'; Martínez 86'	Stadium: El Paloma

29 October 2026	Ávila (4)	1–0 (a.e.t.)	Unionistas (3)	Ávila
20:00	Millán 110'	Report		Stadium: Estadio Adolfo Suárez

29 October 2026	Gimnástica Torrelavega (4)	3–1 (a.e.t.)	UD Ourense (3)	Torrelavega
20:30	Friaza 10'; Saza 96'; Gómez 115'	Report	Labrada 90+3'	Stadium: El Malecón
Note: Originally scheduled to 28 October 2026, the match was postponed due to a train collision in Urda.

29 October 2026	Ribadesella (6)	0–2	Racing Santander (1)	Ribadesella
21:00		Report	Villalibre 48', 63'	Stadium: Oreyana

29 October 2026	Auriense (6)	0–3	Deportivo A Coruña (1)	Ourense (Note: Auriense did not play the match in their main stadium Campo de Oira, Ourense, as it did not meet the broadcasting requirements.)
21:00		Report	Jensen 45', 57'; Cruz 85'	Stadium: O Couto

13 November 2026	Salamanca (4)	0–5	Celta Vigo (1)	Villares de la Reina
21:00		Report		Stadium: Estadio Helmántico
Note: Originally scheduled to 28 October 2026, the match was postponed due to a train collision in Urda.

=== Group 2 ===
27 October 2026	Cuarte (5)	0–2	Girona (2)	Cuarte de Huerva
18:30		Report	Ruiz 23'; Pyshchur 60'	Stadium: Nuevo Municipal

27 October 2026	Sestao River (4)	4–3 (a.e.t.)	Espanyol (1)	Sestao
19:00	Carrión 18'; Ugarte 40'; Laka 98'; Rojo 120+1'	Report	M. Fernández 6' (pen.); R. Fernández 90' (pen.); Moscardo 96'	Stadium: Las Llanas

27 October 2026	Calamocha (4)	0–3	Europa (3)	Calamocha
19:00		Report	Zayzoun 24'; Noureddine 73', 81'	Stadium: Polideportivo Jumaya

27 October 2026	Manresa (4)	2–2 (a.e.t.) (1–3 p)	Sant Andreu (3)	Manresa
20:30	Momoh 116' (pen.); Munells 119'	Report	Agudín 93'; García 105'	Stadium: Nou Estadi Municipal

27 October 2026	Tudelano (4)	0–4	Zaragoza (3)	Tudela
21:00		Report	Delgado 12'; Sans 20' (pen.), 37'; Pinilla 41'	Stadium: Ciudad de Tudela

29 October 2026	Peña Sport (4)	1–5	Huesca (3)	Tafalla
18:00	Recalde 66'	Report	Aznar 22'; Collado 31'; García 55'; Redondo 68'; Gorostidi 89'	Stadium: San Francisco
Note: Originally scheduled to 28 October 2026, the match was postponed due to a train collision in Urda.

29 October 2026	Atlético Calatayud (6)	0–6	Osasuna (1)	Calatayud
19:00		Report	Ra. García 13', 39', 59'; Barja 29'; Dubasin 52'; Bonel 82'	Stadium: San Íñigo

29 October 2026	Varea (5)	0–3	Andorra (2)	Logroño (Note: Varea did not play the match in their main stadium Municipal de Varea, Varea, as it did not meet the broadcasting requirements.)
20:00		Report	Díaz 32'; Rijkhoff 49'; Quintana 71'	Stadium: Estadio Las Gaunas

29 October 2026	Prat (6)	1–6	Athletic Bilbao (1)	L'Hospitalet (Note: Prat did not play the match in their main stadium Sagnier, El Prat, as it did not meet the broadcasting requirements.)
21:00	Reinke 33'	Report	Sannadi 29'; Navarro 31'; Serrano 36'; Vizcay 84'; Imga 87'; Sánchez 88'	Stadium: Municipal de L'Hospitalet

10 November 2026	Pamplona (5)	0–3	Eibar (2)	Mutilva Baja, Aranguren (Note: Pamplona did not play the match in their main stadium Beitikuntzea - Lizasoáin, Pamplona, as it did not meet the broadcasting requirements.)
19:00		Report		Stadium: Estadio Valle Araguren
Note: Originally scheduled to 28 October 2026, the match was postponed due to a train collision in Urda.The match was suspended once again following the death of CD Tenerife player Jesús de Miguel, as the RFEF declared a period of mourning.

10 November 2026	Anaitasuna (6)	1–6	Alavés (1)	Azkoitia
19:00		Report		Stadium: Txerloia
Note: Originally scheduled to 28 October 2026, the match was postponed due to a train collision in Urda.The match was suspended once again following the death of CD Tenerife player Jesús de Miguel, as the RFEF declared a period of mourning.

10 November 2026	Amorebieta (4)	1–0	UD Logroñés (3)	Amorebieta-Etxano
20:00		Report		Stadium: Urritxe
Note: Originally scheduled to 28 October 2026, the match was postponed due to a train collision in Urda.The match was suspended once again following the death of CD Tenerife player Jesús de Miguel, as the RFEF declared a period of mourning.

18 November 2026	Portugalete (4)	0–0 (a.e.t.) (4–1 p)	Real Unión (3)	Portugalete
19:00		Report		Stadium: La Florida
Note: Originally scheduled to 28 October 2026, the match was postponed due to a train collision in Urda.The match was suspended once again following the death of CD Tenerife player Jesús de Miguel, as the RFEF declared a period of mourning.

18 November 2026	Utebo (4)	0–3	Sabadell (2)	Utebo
19:00		Report		Stadium: Santa Ana
Note: Originally scheduled to 28 October 2026, the match was postponed due to a train collision in Urda.The match was suspended once again following the death of CD Tenerife player Jesús de Miguel, as the RFEF declared a period of mourning.

18 November 2026	Reus FCR (4)	1–1 (a.e.t.) (4–3 p)	Barakaldo (3)	Reus
20:30		Report		Stadium: Estadi Municipal de Reus
Note: Originally scheduled to 28 October 2026, the match was postponed due to a train collision in Urda.The match was suspended once again following the death of CD Tenerife player Jesús de Miguel, as the RFEF declared a period of mourning.

=== Group 3 ===
27 October 2026	Pinatar (6)	1–3	Elche (1)	San Pedro del Pinatar
19:00	Benhallou 18'	Report	Ponce 32', 54'; Houary 81'	Stadium: José Antonio Pérez

27 October 2026	Castellonense (4)	1–2 (a.e.t.)	Almería (2)	Castelló
19:45	Murillo 93'	Report	Thalys 112'; Arribas 120+2' (pen.)	Stadium: Antonio Escuriet

27 October 2026	Manacor (5)	0–5	Villarreal (1)	Manacor
21:00		Report	Diatta 13'; Oluwaseyi 26'; Cardona 47'; Nizar 55'; Pépé 68'	Stadium: Na Capellera

27 October 2026	Sporting de Alcázar (6)	0–3	Málaga (1)	Alcázar de San Juan
21:00		Report	Chupe 71' (pen.), 80'; Lorenzo 88'	Stadium: Estadio Municipal

29 October 2026	Poblense (4)	1–2	Ceuta (2)	Sa Pobla
19:00	Riveron 17'	Report	Lapeña 78'; Escobar 90'	Stadium: Nou Camp
Note: Originally scheduled to 28 October 2026, the match was postponed due to a train collision in Urda.

29 October 2026	Atlético Baleares (4)	0–1	Eldense (2)	Palma
19:00		Report	Recio 58'	Stadium: Estadi Balear

29 October 2026	Cieza (4)	0–3	Granada (2)	Cieza
19:30		Report	Hormigo 10'; Gimber 61'; Pascual 84'	Stadium: La Arboleja
Note: Originally scheduled to 28 October 2026, the match was postponed due to a train collision in Urda.

29 October 2026	Conquense (4)	0–3	Castellón (2)	Cuenca
20:00		Report	García 33', 62'; Gala 37'	Stadium: La Fuensanta

29 October 2026	Antequera (3)	2–0	Águilas (3)	Antequera
20:00	Domínguez 21'; Quintana 69'	Report		Stadium: El Maulí

10 November 2026	Mijas-Las Lagunas (4)	1–2	Jaén (3)	Estepona (Note: Mijas-Las Lagunas did not play the match in their main stadium Juan Gambero Culebra, Mijas, as it did not meet the broadcasting requirements.)
20:00		Report		Stadium: Francisco Muñoz Pérez
Note: Originally scheduled to 28 October 2026, the match was postponed due to a train collision in Urda.The following day, it was postponed once again due to the closure of the stadium where it was supposed to be played.

10 November 2026	Tavernes de la Valldigna (6)	0–6	Valencia (1)	Valencia (Note: Tavernes de la Valldigna did not play the match in their main stadium Municipal, Tavernes de la Valldigna, as it did not meet the broadcasting requirements.)
21:00		Report		Stadium: Mestalla
Note: Originally scheduled to 28 October 2026, the match was postponed due to a train collision in Urda.

12 November 2026	Calvo Sotelo (4)	0–3	Albacete (2)	Puertollano
18:30		Report		Stadium: Ciudad de Puertollano
Note: Originally scheduled to 28 October 2026, the match was postponed due to a train collision in Urda.The match was suspended once again following the death of CD Tenerife player Jesús de Miguel, as the RFEF declared a period of mourning.

12 November 2026	Tarancón (4)	1–2 (a.e.t.)	Levante (1)	Tarancón
19:00		Report		Stadium: Estadio Municipal Tarancón
Note: Originally scheduled to 28 October 2026, the match was postponed due to a train collision in Urda.The match was suspended once again following the death of CD Tenerife player Jesús de Miguel, as the RFEF declared a period of mourning.

18 November 2026	Alcoyano (4)	1–3 (a.e.t.)	Mallorca (2)	Alcoy
20:00		Report		Stadium: El Collao
Note: Originally scheduled to 28 October 2026, the match was postponed due to a train collision in Urda.The match was suspended once again following the death of CD Tenerife player Jesús de Miguel, as the RFEF declared a period of mourning.

18 November 2026	Minera (4)	1–2 (a.e.t.)	Cartagena (3)	Llano del Beal
20:30		Report		Stadium: Ángel Celdrán
Note: Originally scheduled to 28 October 2026, the match was postponed due to a train collision in Urda.The match was suspended once again following the death of CD Tenerife player Jesús de Miguel, as the RFEF declared a period of mourning.

=== Group 4 ===
27 October 2026	Atlético Paso (4)	3–1	Córdoba (2)	El Paso, La Palma
20:00 WET	Villoslada 64'; Perera 76', 95'	Report	Sanz 30'	Stadium: Municipal

27 October 2026	Alcalá (4)	1–3 (a.e.t.)	Las Palmas (2)	Alcalá de Henares
20:00	Simón 68'	Report	Kirian 49', 95'; Fuster 105'	Stadium: Estadio Municipal del Val

27 October 2026	Ciudad de Lucena (4)	0–1	Rayo Majadahonda (3)	Lucena
20:00		Report	Del Pozo 90+2'	Stadium: Ciudad de Lucena

27 October 2026	Don Benito (4)	2–4 (a.e.t.)	Extremadura (3)	Don Benito
20:30	Del Pozo 35', 44'	Report	Díaz 75' (pen.); Morcillo 81'; Burgos 97'; Al-Lal 120+2'	Stadium: Estadio Vicente Sanz

27 October 2026	Recreativo (4)	2–3 (a.e.t.)	Rayo Vallecano (1)	Huelva
21:00	Marín 23'; Romero 109' (pen.)	Report	Alemão 43' (pen.), 97'; De Frutos 99'	Stadium: Nuevo Colombino

29 October 2026	Lebrijana (6)	2–3	Getafe (1)	Lebrija
19:00	Gómez 10'; Yuyo 23'	Report	Abqar 45'; Mayoral 45+2'; Mangala 68'	Stadium: Municipal

29 October 2026	San Sebastián de los Reyes (4)	1–2 (a.e.t.)	Coria (3)	San Sebastián de los Reyes
19:00	De la Llave 63'	Report	Toper 34'; Benji 119'	Stadium: Nuevo Matapiñonera

29 October 2026	Xerez (4)	1–3	Cádiz (2)	Jerez de la Frontera
21:00	López 2'	Report	Gutiérrez 34'; Pascual 59'; Vázquez 83'	Stadium: Municipal de Chapín
Note: Originally scheduled to 28 October 2026, the match was postponed due to a train collision in Urda.

29 October 2026	Sporting Hortaleza (6)	0–3	Sevilla (1)	Alcalá de Henares (Note: Sporting Hortaleza did not play the match in their main stadium Municipal Sporting Hortaleza, Madrid, as it did not meet the broadcasting requirements.)
21:00		Report	Ure 24'; Peque 40' (pen.); Vargas 56'	Stadium: Estadio Municipal del Val

10 November 2026	Trival Valderas (5)	0–1	Leganés (2)	Leganés (Note: Trival Valderas did not play the match in their main stadium La Canaleja, Alcorcón, as it did not meet the broadcasting requirements.)
20:00		Report		Stadium: Estadio Ontime Butarque
Note: Originally scheduled to 28 October 2026, the match was postponed due to a train collision in Urda.

12 November 2026	Navalcarnero (4)	2–3 (a.e.t.)	Real Betis (1)	Alcorcón (Note: Navalcarnero did not play the match in their main stadium Mariano González, Navalcarnero, as it did not meet the broadcasting requirements.)
19:00		Report		Stadium: Santo Domingo
Note: Originally scheduled to 28 October 2026, the match was postponed due to a train collision in Urda.

18 November 2026	Badajoz (4)	2–5	Tenerife (2)	Badajoz
20:00		Report		Stadium: Nuevo Vivero
Note: Originally scheduled to 28 October 2026, the match was postponed due to a train collision in Urda. A few days later, the match has been postponed once again, because they played a league match between Andorra, following the postponement of their original fixture—due to a weather alert caused by a severe storm on the island. It was postponed for a third time at the request of CD Tenerife as a gesture of mourning for their player Jesús de Miguel.

== Second round ==
=== Draw ===
The draw for the second round will be held on 23 November 2026. Teams will be divided in two groups.

This second round maintains the criteria of geographical proximity.

A total of 28 matches will be played between 1 and 3 December 2026.

Pot 1 Group 1	Pot 2 Group 2
Alavés; Athletic Bilbao; Celta Vigo; Deportivo A Coruña; Getafe; Osasuna; Rayo Vallecano; Racing Santander; Villarreal; Andorra; Burgos; Castellón; Eibar; Girona; Leganés; Mallorca; Sabadell; Sporting Gijón; Valladolid; Cultural Leonesa; Europa; Huesca; Mirandés; Ponferradina; Rayo Majadahonda; Sant Andreu; Zamora; Zaragoza; Amorebieta; Arosa; Ávila; Gimnástica Torrelavega; Numancia; Portugalete; Reus FCR; Sestao River	Betis; Elche; Levante; Málaga; Sevilla; Valencia; Albacete; Almería; Cádiz; Ceuta; Eldense; Granada; Las Palmas; Tenerife; Antequera; Cartagena; Coria; Extremadura; Jaén; Atlético Paso

=== Group 1 ===
1-2-3 December 2026	v

1-2-3 December 2026	v

1-2-3 December 2026	v

1-2-3 December 2026	v

1-2-3 December 2026	v

1-2-3 December 2026	v

1-2-3 December 2026	v

1-2-3 December 2026	v

1-2-3 December 2026	v

1-2-3 December 2026	v

1-2-3 December 2026	v

1-2-3 December 2026	v

1-2-3 December 2026	v

1-2-3 December 2026	v

1-2-3 December 2026	v

1-2-3 December 2026	v

1-2-3 December 2026	v

1-2-3 December 2026	v

=== Group 2 ===
1-2-3 December 2026	v

1-2-3 December 2026	v

1-2-3 December 2026	v

1-2-3 December 2026	v

1-2-3 December 2026	v

1-2-3 December 2026	v

1-2-3 December 2026	v

1-2-3 December 2026	v

1-2-3 December 2026	v

1-2-3 December 2026	v
