= Luis Carlos =

Luís Carlos
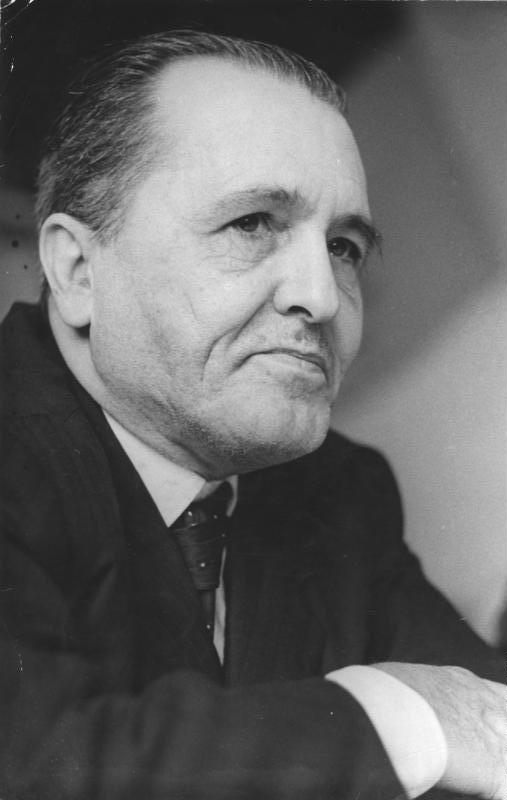
- Luís Carlos Prestes

Other gender
- Feminine: Luísa Carla

Origin
- Origin: Portuguese, Spanish

Other names
- Alternative spelling: Luiz Carlos (archaic Brazilian form)
- Variant form: Luis Carlos (Spanish)
- Anglicisation: Louis Charles
- Related names: Luis, Carlos

Luís Carlos or Luis Carlos is a masculine double name, the Portuguese and Spanish form of the English double name Louis Charles. The primary form of the name is Louis-Charles in French, and it is now present in several languages, such as Luigi Carlo in Italian, Lluís Carles in Catalan, and Ludwig Karl in German.

The spelling Luís is also written as Luiz due to the influence of archaic Portuguese, where names were written without standardized rules. Luís Carlos, a double name derived from French cultural influences, has been widely adopted within Luso-Brazilian society, ranking among the most prevalent composite names in Brazil.

== Personalities ==
- Luís Carlos (footballer, born 1962), Brazilian football forward
- Luís Carlos (footballer, born 1972), Portuguese football winger
- Luís Carlos (footballer, born 1982), Portuguese football attacking midfielder
- Luís Carlos (footballer, born July 1987) Brazilian football goalkeeper
- Luis Carlos (footballer, born 1990), Spanish football winger
- Luis Carlos Álvarez Valdés (born 2004), Mexican tennis player
- Luis Carlos Cardoso da Silva (born 1984), Brazilian paracanoeist
- Luís Carlos Lima (born 1987), Brazilian football winger
- Luís Carlos Lima de Souza (born 1977), Brazilian football winger

== See also ==
- Luiz Carlos (disambiguation)
