= Carlos Luengo =

Spanish footballer (born 2004)

Personal information
- Full name: Carlos Luengo Aguado
- Date of birth: 14 January 2004 (age 22)
- Place of birth: Cuéllar, Spain
- Position: Right-back

Team information
- Current team: Ávila

Youth career
- Valladolid
- 2021–2022: Gimnástica Segoviana
- 2022–2023: Cartagena

Senior career*
Years	Team	Apps	(Gls)
2023–2024	Atlético Tordesillas	10	(0)
2024–2026	Júpiter Leonés	62	(1)
2025–2026	Cultural Leonesa	0	(0)
2026–	Ávila	0	(0)
- * Club domestic league appearances and goals as of 10 May 2026

Carlos Luengo Aguado (born 14 January 2004) is a Spanish professional footballer who plays as a right-back for Real Ávila CF.

== Career ==
Born in Cuéllar, Segovia, Castile and León, Luengo played for Real Valladolid and Gimnástica Segoviana CF before joining the Juvenil squad of FC Cartagena on 5 July 2022. On 26 June 2023, after finishing his formation, he joined Tercera Federación side Atlético Tordesillas.

On 26 July 2024, Luengo moved to Cultural y Deportiva Leonesa and was initially assigned to farm team Júpiter Leonés also in the fifth tier. On 11 July of the following year, after being a regular starter, he renewed his contract for a further year.

Luengo made his first team debut on 3 December 2025, coming on as a late substitute for goalscorer Paco Cortés in a 4–2 home win over FC Andorra, for the season's Copa del Rey. The following 27 June, he moved to Segunda Federación side Real Ávila CF.
