= AD Sporting Hortaleza =

Spanish football team

Sporting Hortaleza
- Full name: Agrupación Deportiva Sporting Hortaleza
- Founded: 1964; 62 years ago
- Ground: Municipal Sporting Hortaleza, Madrid, Spain
- Capacity: 400
- President: Miguel Romón
- Manager: Jorge Mendoza
- League: Primera Autonómica de Aficionados – Group 1
- 2025–26: Primera Autonómica de Aficionados – Group 1, 8th of 18
- Website: adsportingdehortaleza.com
Home colours	Away colours

Agrupación Deportiva Sporting Hortaleza is a Spanish football team based in Madrid. Founded in 1964, they play in Primera Autonómica de Aficionados – Group 1, holding home matches at Polideportivo Municipal Sporting Hortaleza, with a capacity of 400 people.

== History ==
Founded in 1964, Sporting Hortaleza reached the Primera Regional Preferente Castellana in 1986, in what would be the last season of the Federación Castellana de Fútbol before its dissolution. Relegated in 1988, the club only returned to the top tier of regional football in 2015, after achieving promotion to the Preferente de Madrid.

On 12 June 2026, Sporting Hortaleza qualified to the preliminary rounds of the 2026–27 Copa del Rey, after winning the Copa RFFM de Aficionados.

== Season to season ==
Season	Tier	Division	Place	Copa del Rey
1975–76	8	3ª Reg.	1st	
1976–77	7	3ª Reg. P.	14th	
1977–78	8	3ª Reg. P.	10th	
1978–79	8	3ª Reg. P.	16th	
1979–80	9	3ª Reg.	9th	
1980–81	9	3ª Reg.	3rd	
1981–82	9	3ª Reg.	5th	
1982–83	8	3ª Reg. P.	7th	
1983–84	8	3ª Reg. P.	2nd	
1984–85	7	2ª Reg.	2nd	
1985–86	6	1ª Reg.	5th	
1986–87	5	Reg. Pref.	15th	
1987–88	5	Reg. Pref.	18th	
1988–89	6	1ª Reg.	11th	
1989–90	6	1ª Reg.	7th	
1990–91	6	1ª Reg.	9th	
1991–92	6	1ª Reg.	13th	
1992–93	6	1ª Reg.	17th	
1993–94	7	2ª Reg.	18th	
1994–95	8	3ª Reg.	5th	

Season	Tier	Division	Place	Copa del Rey
1995–96	8	3ª Reg.	2nd	
1996–97	7	2ª Reg.	3rd	
1997–98	7	2ª Reg.	3rd	
1998–99	7	2ª Reg.	7th	
1999–2000	7	2ª Reg.	2nd	
2000–01	6	1ª Reg.	13th	
2001–02	6	1ª Reg.	3rd	
2002–03	6	1ª Reg.	16th	
2003–04	7	2ª Reg.	7th	
2004–05	7	2ª Reg.	9th	
2005–06	7	2ª Reg.	6th	
2006–07	7	2ª Reg.	18th	
2007–08	8	3ª Reg.	4th	
2008–09	8	3ª Reg.	4th	
2009–10	8	3ª Afic.	1st	
2010–11	7	2ª Afic.	2nd	
2011–12	6	1ª Afic.	14th	
2012–13	6	1ª Afic.	7th	
2013–14	6	1ª Afic.	3rd	
2014–15	6	1ª Afic.	1st	

Season	Tier	Division	Place	Copa del Rey
2015–16	5	Pref.	10th	
2016–17	5	Pref.	16th	
2017–18	6	1ª Afic.	2nd	
2018–19	5	Pref.	11th	
2019–20	5	Pref.	14th	
2020–21	5	Pref.	13th	
2021–22	6	Pref.	16th	
2022–23	7	1ª Afic.	8th	
2023–24	6	Pref.	15th	
2024–25	7	Pref. Afic.	13th	
2025–26	6	1ª Aut.	8th	
2026–27	6	1ª Aut.		First round
