= UD Pinatar =

Association football club in Spain

Pinatar
- Full name: Unión Deportiva Pinatar
- Founded: 2017; 9 years ago
- Ground: José Antonio Pérez
- Capacity: 3,200
- President: Antonio Rubio Ortiz
- Manager: Francisco Carreño
- League: Preferente Autonómica
- 2025–26: Primera Autonómica – Group 1, 1st of 16 (champions)
Home colours	Away colours

Unión Deportiva Pinatar (formerly Atlético Pinatarense) is a football club based in San Pedro del Pinatar, Murcia, Spain. Founded in 2017, they play in Preferente Autonómica, holding home games at the Estadio José Antonio Pérez.

== History ==
Logo used until 2026

Founded in 2017, Atlético Pinatarense started playing in the Segunda Autonómica, achieving immediate promotion. In 2020, the club achieved a promotion to the Preferente Autonómica, but was relegated back to the Primera Autonómica in 2022.

On 29 June 2026, shotly after returning to the Preferente, Pinatarense won the Supercopa Regional after defeating CF Ciudad de Calasparra in the final, and qualified to the preliminary round of the 2026–27 Copa del Rey. In July, however, the club announced a change of name to Unión Deportiva Pinatar.

In October 2026, Pinatar defeated Atlético Melilla CF in the preliminary rounds of the cup, but were knocked out in the following round by La Liga side Elche CF.

== Season to season ==
Season	Tier	Division	Place	Copa del Rey
2017–18	7	2ª Aut.	5th	
2018–19	6	1ª Aut.	14th	
2019–20	6	1ª Aut.	11th	
2020–21	5	Pref. Aut.	12th	
2021–22	6	Pref. Aut.	13th	
2022–23	7	1ª Aut.	1st	
2023–24	6	Pref. Aut.	14th	
2024–25	6	Pref. Aut.	16th	
2025–26	7	1ª Aut.	1st	
2026–27	6	Pref. Aut.		First round
