= Miguel Goñi =

Spanish footballer

Personal information
- Full name: Miguel Goñi Gallego
- Date of birth: 10 March 1998 (age 28)
- Place of birth: Santander, Spain
- Height: 1.77 m (5 ft 10 in)
- Position: Centre back

Team information
- Current team: Gimnástica Torrelavega
- Number: 4

Youth career
- Bansander
- 2008–2017: Racing Santander

Senior career*
Years	Team	Apps	(Gls)
2017–2020	Racing B	89	(4)
2020–2021	Racing Santander	2	(0)
2020–2021	→ Laredo (loan)	22	(2)
2021–2022	Laredo	30	(1)
2022–	Gimnástica Torrelavega	54	(0)
- * Club domestic league appearances and goals as of 15 June 2025

Miguel Goñi Gallego (born 10 March 1998) is a Spanish professional footballer who plays as a central defender for Gimnástica Torrelavega.

== Club career ==
Goñi was born in Santander, Cantabria, and joined Racing de Santander's youth setup in 2008 at the age of ten, from Club Bansander. He made his senior debut with the reserves during the 2016–17 season, in Tercera División.

Goñi made his first team debut on 11 July 2020, coming on as a late substitute for Nando García in a 1–0 Segunda División home win against SD Huesca. On 28 September, he was loaned to Segunda División B side CD Laredo for the season.

== Personal life ==
Goñi's twin brother Pablo is also a footballer. A forward, he too was groomed at Racing.
