= Auriense CA =

Spanish football club

Auriense
- Full name: Auriense Cented Academy
- Founded: 2020; 6 years ago (as Cented Academy FS)
- Ground: Campo de Oira, Ourense, Galicia, Spain
- Capacity: 5,659
- President: Manu Cedrón
- Manager: Dani Prado
- League: Preferente Futgal – Group 2
- 2025–26: Preferente Futgal – Group 2, 14th of 18
Home colours	Away colours

Auriense Cented Academy is a Spanish football team based in Ourense, in the autonomous community of Galicia. Founded in 2020, they play in Preferente Futgal – Group 2, holding home matches at Campo Municipal de Oira, which has a capacity of 5,659 spectators.

== History ==
Founded in 2020 as Cented Academy Football School by president Manu Cedrón, the club started playing in the Segunda Galicia in the following year, and achieved promotion in 2023. In June 2024, after just one campaign in the Primeira Galicia, the club achieved a second consecutive promotion to the Preferente Futgal.

In 2026, Cented Academy changed name to Auriense Cented Academy, and reached an agreement with Deportivo Alavés to help in the development of their youth players. On 30 August of that year, the club won the Supercopa Galicia after defeating SD Negreira in the finals, and qualified to the preliminary rounds of the 2026–27 Copa del Rey.

== Season to season ==
Season	Tier	Division	Place	Copa del Rey
2021–22	8	2ª Gal.	7th	
2022–23	8	2ª Gal.	1st	
2023–24	7	1ª Gal.	3rd	
2024–25	6	Pref. Futgal	10th	
2025–26	6	Pref. Futgal	14th	
2026–27	6	Pref. Futgal	67th	
