= CD Laredo =

Association football club in Spain

Coordinates: 43.407068°N 3.415093°W

Laredo
- Full name: Club Deportivo Laredo
- Nickname: Charles
- Founded: 1 May 1918; 108 years ago
- Ground: Campo de Fútbol San Lorenzo, Laredo, Cantabria, Spain
- Capacity: 2,500
- President: Victorino Expósito
- Head coach: Raúl Pérez
- League: Tercera Federación – Group 3
- 2025–26: Tercera Federación – Group 3, 2nd of 18
- Website: cdlaredo.com
Home colours	Away colours

Club Deportivo Laredo is a Spanish football team based in Laredo, in the autonomous community of Cantabria. Founded in 1918, it plays in Tercera Federación – Group 3, holding home matches at Campo de Fútbol San Lorenzo, which has a capacity of 2,500.

== History ==
CD Laredo was founded in 1918 as Olimpia Sport Club. In 1927, the club folded, and Sociedad Deportiva Charleston Foot-ball Club was created to take their place. In 1932 the club won the Regional Final against Madrid of Santander (Racing reserve team) 4:1. That was a huge success in the beginning of its history. After the Spanish Civil War, due to a temporary law forbidding the use of foreign words in football club names, the team's official denomination changed to the current Club Deportivo Laredo.

In 1987, the club promoted for the first time to Segunda División B. Despite being immediately relegated, the club returned to the third tier just one year later, but it finished again in the relegation positions.

Since 1990, Laredo played uninterruptedly in Tercera División. In the 2018-19 season the club won silver medals by finishing just 6 points behind the champion UM Escobedo.

== Season to season ==
Season	Tier	Division	Place	Copa del Rey
1931–32	6	3ª Reg.	1st	
1932–33	DNP			
1933–34	5	2ª Reg.	2nd	
1934–35	5	2ª Reg.	1st	
1935–36	4	1ª Reg.	6th	
1939–40	DNP			
1940–41	4	1ª Reg.	2nd	
1941–42	3	1ª Reg.	1st	
1942–43	3	1ª Reg.	6th	
1943–44	4	1ª Reg.	3rd	
1944–45	4	1ª Reg.	4th	
1945–46	4	1ª Reg.	4th	
1946–47	4	1ª Reg.	4th	
1947–48	4	1ª Reg.	4th	
1948–49	4	1ª Reg.	3rd	
1949–50	4	1ª Reg.	11th	
1950–51	4	1ª Reg.	8th	
1951–52	4	1ª Reg.	2nd	
1952–53	4	1ª Reg.	5th	
1953–54	4	1ª Reg.	2nd	

Season	Tier	Division	Place	Copa del Rey
1954–55	3	3ª	3rd	
1955–56	4	1ª Reg.	1st	
1956–57	3	3ª	15th	
1957–58	4	1ª Reg.	5th	
1958–59	4	1ª Reg.	2nd	
1959–60	3	3ª	14th	
1960–61	3	3ª	4th	
1961–62	3	3ª	10th	
1962–63	3	3ª	13th	
1963–64	4	1ª Reg.	1st	
1964–65	3	3ª	6th	
1965–66	3	3ª	6th	
1966–67	3	3ª	16th	
1967–68	4	1ª Reg.	2nd	
1968–69	4	1ª Reg.	1st	
1969–70	3	3ª	17th	First round
1970–71	4	1ª Reg.	3rd	
1971–72	4	1ª Reg.	1st	
1972–73	3	3ª	16th	Second round
1973–74	4	1ª Reg.	3rd	

Season	Tier	Division	Place	Copa del Rey
1974–75	4	Reg. Pref.	1st	
1975–76	3	3ª	14th	Second round
1976–77	3	3ª	20th	First round
1977–78	5	Reg. Pref.	2nd	
1978–79	5	Reg. Pref.	6th	
1979–80	5	Reg. Pref.	4th	
1980–81	5	Reg. Pref.	6th	
1981–82	5	Reg. Pref.	3rd	
1982–83	5	Reg. Pref.	2nd	
1983–84	4	3ª	8th	
1984–85	4	3ª	15th	
1985–86	4	3ª	5th	
1986–87	4	3ª	3rd	First round
1987–88	3	2ª B	17th	First round
1988–89	4	3ª	1st	First round
1989–90	3	2ª B	17th	
1990–91	4	3ª	2nd	Second round
1991–92	4	3ª	3rd	First round
1992–93	4	3ª	3rd	Withdrew
1993–94	4	3ª	3rd	

Season	Tier	Division	Place	Copa del Rey
1994–95	4	3ª	6th	
1995–96	4	3ª	13th	
1996–97	4	3ª	12th	
1997–98	4	3ª	13th	
1998–99	4	3ª	11th	
1999–2000	4	3ª	11th	
2000–01	4	3ª	2nd	
2001–02	4	3ª	5th	
2002–03	4	3ª	7th	
2003–04	4	3ª	5th	
2004–05	4	3ª	13th	
2005–06	4	3ª	7th	
2006–07	4	3ª	5th	
2007–08	4	3ª	9th	
2008–09	4	3ª	9th	
2009–10	4	3ª	5th	
2010–11	4	3ª	11th	
2011–12	4	3ª	2nd	
2012–13	4	3ª	4th	
2013–14	4	3ª	2nd	

Season	Tier	Division	Place	Copa del Rey
2014–15	4	3ª	1st	
2015–16	4	3ª	1st	Third round
2016–17	4	3ª	3rd	First round
2017–18	4	3ª	3rd	
2018–19	4	3ª	2nd	
2019–20	4	3ª	1st	First round
2020–21	3	2ª B	7th	First round
2021–22	4	2ª RFEF	13th	
2022–23	4	2ª Fed.	15th	
2023–24	5	3ª Fed.	2nd	
2024–25	4	2ª Fed.	18th	First round
2025–26	5	3ª Fed.	2nd	
2026–27	5	3ª Fed.		TBD

- 3 seasons in Segunda División B
- 3 seasons in Segunda Federación/Segunda División RFEF
- 48 seasons in Tercera División
- 3 seasons in Tercera Federación

== Current squad ==
As of 28 March 2021

Note: Flags indicate national team as defined under FIFA eligibility rules; some limited exceptions apply. Players may hold more than one non-FIFA nationality.

No.	Pos.	Nation	Player
1	GK	ESP	David Puras
2	DF	ESP	Álex Rasines
3	DF	ESP	Miguel Goñi (on loan from Racing de Santander)
4	DF	ESP	Diego Portilla
5	MF	ESP	Felipe Peredo
6	FW	ESP	Álvaro García
7	DF	ESP	Manu Ortiz
8	MF	ESP	David Sanz
9	FW	ESP	Iván Argos
10	FW	ESP	David Vinatea (captain)
11	FW	ESP	Ricky

No.	Pos.	Nation	Player
12	FW	ESP	Saúl García (on loan from Racing de Santander)
13	GK	ESP	Rafa Pedrero
14	FW	ESP	Nacho Altadill
15	MF	ESP	Diego Marta
16	DF	ESP	Borja Ares
17	DF	ESP	Álex Pérez
19	DF	ESP	Cristian Toboso
20	DF	ESP	Guipu
21	MF	MAR	Faouzi Jakkal
22	FW	ESP	Juancar Campos
—	DF	DOM	Brayan Ademán

== Notable former players ==
- (Spain) José Emilio Amavisca
