= Luiz Carlos =

Luiz Carlos, Luis Carlos is a given name. Notable people with the name include:

- Luiz Carlos Dórea (born 1965), Brazilian boxing and mixed martial arts trainer
- Luiz Carlos (footballer, born 1971), Luiz Carlos Guarnieri, Brazilian football defender
- Luiz Carlos (footballer, born March 1980), Luiz Carlos Guedes Stukas, Brazilian football centre-back
- Luiz Carlos (footballer, born August 1980), Luiz Carlos de Souza Pinto, Brazilian football striker
- Luiz Carlos (footballer, born 1982), Luiz Carlos Vieira Junior, Brazilian football midfielder
- Luíz Carlos (footballer, born 1985), Luíz Carlos Martins Moreira, Brazilian football defensive midfielder
- Luiz Carlos (footballer, born 1988), Luiz Carlos Oliveira de Bitencourt, Brazilian football goalkeeper

== See also ==
- Luis Carlos (disambiguation)
