= CF UE Tavernes de la Valldigna =

Tavernes de la Valldigna
- Full name: Club de Fútbol Unió Esportiva Tavernes de la Valldigna
- Founded: 1941; 85 years ago
- Ground: Municipal, Tavernes de la Valldigna, Valencian Community, Spain
- Capacity: 2,000
- President: Toni Hernández
- Head coach: Carlos Narbona
- League: Lliga Comunitat – South
- 2025–26: Lliga Comunitat – South, 3rd of 18
Home colours	Away colours

Club de Fútbol Unió Esportiva Tavernes de la Valldigna is a Spanish football team based in Tavernes de la Valldigna, in the autonomous Valencian Community. Founded in 1940, they play in Lliga Comunitat – South, holding home games at Camp Municipal de Tavernes de la Valldigna, with a capacity of 2,000 people.

== History ==
Founded in 1941 as Unión Deportiva Tabernes, they played two seasons (1942–43 and 1943–44) in the regional leagues before remaining inactive for a decade, only returning in 1954. The club achieved promotion to Tercera División in 1961, but was relegated after three seasons in the category.

Tabernes was renamed Unión Deportiva Tavernes in 1989, and Unió Esportiva Tavernes in 2015. On 4 May 2026, the club qualified to the preliminary rounds of the 2026–27 Copa del Rey, after winning La Nostra Copa.

== Seasons ==
Season	Tier	Division	Place	Copa del Rey
1942–43	—	Regional	—	
1943–44	—	Regional	—	
1944–1954	DNP			
1954–55	6	3ª Reg.	1st	
1955–56	5	2ª Reg.	7th	
1956–57	4	1ª Reg.	7th	
1957–58	4	1ª Reg.	7th	
1958–59	4	1ª Reg.	3rd	
1959–60	4	1ª Reg.	4th	
1960–61	4	1ª Reg.	2nd	
1961–62	3	3ª	4th	
1962–63	3	3ª	14th	
1963–64	3	3ª	15th	
1964–65	4	1ª Reg.	18th	
1965–66	4	1ª Reg.	20th	
1966–67	5	2ª Reg.		
1967–68	5	2ª Reg.	2nd	
1968–69	5	2ª Reg.	10th	
1969–70	5	2ª Reg.	7th	
1970–71	5	1ª Reg.	16th	

Season	Tier	Division	Place	Copa del Rey
1971–72	5	1ª Reg.	5th	
1972–73	5	1ª Reg.	10th	
1973–74	5	1ª Reg.	17th	
1974–75	6	2ª Reg.	2nd	
1975–76	5	1ª Reg.	11th	
1976–77	5	1ª Reg.	8th	
1977–78	6	1ª Reg.	1st	
1978–79	5	Reg. Pref.	15th	
1979–80	5	Reg. Pref.	12th	
1980–81	5	Reg. Pref.	8th	
1981–82	5	Reg. Pref.	17th	
1982–83	6	1ª Reg.	8th	
1983–84	6	1ª Reg.	3rd	
1984–85	5	Reg. Pref.	21st	
1985–86	6	1ª Reg.	12th	
1986–87	6	1ª Reg.	4th	
1987–88	6	1ª Reg.		
1988–89	5	Reg. Pref.	14th	
1989–90	5	Reg. Pref.	6th	
1990–91	5	Reg. Pref.	9th	

Season	Tier	Division	Place	Copa del Rey
1991–92	5	Reg. Pref.	3rd	
1992–93	5	Reg. Pref.	7th	
1993–94	5	Reg. Pref.	10th	
1994–95	5	Reg. Pref.	8th	
1995–96	5	Reg. Pref.	7th	
1996–97	5	Reg. Pref.	3rd	
1997–98	5	Reg. Pref.	9th	
1998–99	5	Reg. Pref.	5th	
1999–2000	5	Reg. Pref.	1st	
2000–01	5	Reg. Pref.	16th	
2001–02	6	1ª Reg.	1st	
2002–03	5	Reg. Pref.	6th	
2003–04	5	Reg. Pref.	8th	
2004–05	5	Reg. Pref.	12th	
2005–06	5	Reg. Pref.	8th	
2006–07	5	Reg. Pref.	8th	
2007–08	5	Reg. Pref.	5th	
2008–09	5	Reg. Pref.	10th	
2009–10	5	Reg. Pref.	10th	
2010–11	5	Reg. Pref.	10th	

Season	Tier	Division	Place	Copa del Rey
2011–12	5	Reg. Pref.	13th	
2012–13	5	Reg. Pref.	7th	
2013–14	5	Reg. Pref.	8th	
2014–15	5	Reg. Pref.	8th	
2015–16	5	Reg. Pref.	1st	
2016–17	5	Reg. Pref.	8th	
2017–18	5	Reg. Pref.	10th	
2018–19	5	Reg. Pref.	5th	
2019–20	5	Reg. Pref.	3rd	
2020–21	5	Reg. Pref.	2nd	
2021–22	6	Reg. Pref.	3rd	
2022–23	6	Reg. Pref.	5th	
2023–24	6	Lliga Com.	8th	
2024–25	6	Lliga Com.	4th	
2025–26	6	Lliga Com.	3rd	
2026–27	6	Lliga Com.		

- 3 seasons in Tercera División
