= Fortunato Quispe Mendoza =

Dominican football manager (1934–2022)

Personal information
- Date of birth: 7 October 1934
- Place of birth: Cochabamba, Bolivia
- Date of death: 14 January 2022 (aged 87)

Managerial career
- Years: Team
- 1967–1974: Dominican Republic
- 1968: Aurora
- 1969–197x: UASD

Fortunato Quispe Mendoza (7 October 1934 – 14 January 2022) was a Bolivian-Dominican professional football manager.

== Career ==
Quispe Mendoza did his first studies in the school Simón Bolívar, and secondary in the National Simon Bolivar College in Bolivia. He had degrees in Political Science, Media Education mention Social Sciences and Physical Education mention Football.

His university studies were conducted at the University of San Simón in Cochabamba, Bolivia, as well as the National University of Mexico (UNAM), at the University of San Juan, Puerto Rico (UPR) at the Technical University of Santo Domingo and the Central University for Professional Studies (UCDEP).

Quispe Mendoza arrived in the Dominican Republic in the turbulent months of 1965, specifically the May 4th international representative of ILO work at times.

Quispe Mendoza possesses a spotless record of service in the Dominican sports. Founded and was the first coach of the Inter-School Football League in 1966, he created and was the leader of the National League for Child and Youth Football (1967).

In 1968, he founded and served as coach and mentor first-team first division of Aurora, where every player was genuinely Dominican and selected public schools and neighborhoods.

By 1969 he founded and was the first coach of First Division UASD, was responsible for creating the first Dominican Football Federation, in the capital city, on August 6, 1970.

He was promoter and founder of several associations and clubs in much of the Dominican Republic, giving teaching of football throughout the country.

From 1967 to 1974 he coached Dominican Republic national football team. As national coach, he led at the 1970 FIFA World Cup in Mexico (1968), at the XI Central American and Caribbean Games in Panama (1970), at the VI Pan American Games in Cali, Colombia (1971); Youth Cup CONCACAF in Cuba (1972), at the XII Central American and Caribbean Games in Santo Domingo (1974) and the Youth Football Championship CONCACAF in San Juan, Puerto Rico (1976), among other achievements as a leader.

On 21 May 2004, in France, the FIFA honored him as Football Person Century, to mark the centenary of FIFA.

Quispe Mendoza later occupied the first vice president of the Dominican Football Federation.

Quispe Mendoza died on 14 January 2022, at the age of 87.
