= CP Talayuela =

Association football team in Spain

Talayuela
- Full name: Club Polideportivo Talayuela
- Founded: 1979
- Ground: Ciudad Deportiva, Talayuela, Extremadura, Spain
- Capacity: 500
- President: Roberto Gilarte
- Manager: Beni Besale
- League: Primera Extremeña – Group 1
- 2025–26: Primera Extremeña – Group 1, 4th of 14
| Home colours | Away colours |

Club Polideportivo Talayuela is a football team based in Talayuela, in the autonomous community of Extremadura. Founded in 1979, they play in Primera Extremeña – Group 1, holding home matches at the Ciudad Deportiva de Talayuela, with a capacity of 500 people.

== History ==
Founded in 1979, the club was named Club Polideportivo Atalaya and replaced Talayuela CF, dissolved. In 1984, the club achieved a first-ever promotion to Tercera División.

In 1989, after suffering relegation from the fourth division, Atalaya changed name to Club Polideportivo Cetarsa Talayuela. In 1993, after another relegation from the fourth tier, the club was renamed to Club Polideportivo Talayuela.

== Season to season ==
| Season | Tier | Division | Place | Copa del Rey |
|---|---|---|---|---|
| 1979–80 | 6 | 1ª Reg. | 5th | |
| 1980–81 | 6 | 1ª Reg. | 3rd | |
| 1981–82 | 6 | 1ª Reg. | 1st | |
| 1982–83 | 5 | Reg. Pref. | 16th | |
| 1983–84 | 5 | Reg. Pref. | 3rd | |
| 1984–85 | 4 | 3ª | 19th | |
| 1985–86 | 5 | Reg. Pref. | 2nd | |
| 1986–87 | 4 | 3ª | 8th | |
| 1987–88 | 4 | 3ª | 12th | |
| 1988–89 | 4 | 3ª | 21st | |
| 1989–90 | 5 | Reg. Pref. | 2nd | |
| 1990–91 | 4 | 3ª | 13th | |
| 1991–92 | 4 | 3ª | 17th | |
| 1992–93 | 4 | 3ª | 20th | |
| 1993–94 | 5 | Reg. Pref. | 15th | |
| 1994–95 | 5 | Reg. Pref. | 13th | |
| 1995–96 | 5 | Reg. Pref. | 7th | |
| 1996–97 | 5 | Reg. Pref. | 11th | |
| 1997–98 | 5 | Reg. Pref. | 4th | |
| 1998–99 | 5 | Reg. Pref. | 11th | |

| Season | Tier | Division | Place | Copa del Rey |
|---|---|---|---|---|
| 1999–2000 | 5 | Reg. Pref. | 20th | |
| 2000–01 | 6 | 1ª Reg. | 3rd | |
| 2001–02 | 5 | Reg. Pref. | 14th | |
| 2002–03 | 5 | Reg. Pref. | 4th | |
| 2003–04 | 5 | Reg. Pref. | 2nd | |
| 2004–05 | 5 | Reg. Pref. | 8th | |
| 2005–06 | 5 | Reg. Pref. | 8th | |
| 2006–07 | 5 | Reg. Pref. | 8th | |
| 2007–08 | 5 | Reg. Pref. | 16th | |
| 2008–09 | 5 | Reg. Pref. | 12th | |
| 2009–10 | 5 | Reg. Pref. | 18th | |
| 2010–11 | 6 | 1ª Reg. | 4th | |
| 2011–12 | 5 | Reg. Pref. | 14th | |
| 2012–13 | 5 | Reg. Pref. | 16th | |
| 2013–14 | 5 | Reg. Pref. | 6th | |
| 2014–15 | 5 | Reg. Pref. | 7th | |
| 2015–16 | 5 | Reg. Pref. | 10th | |
| 2016–17 | 5 | 1ª Ext. | 8th | |
| 2017–18 | 5 | 1ª Ext. | 6th | |
| 2018–19 | 5 | 1ª Ext. | 4th | |

| Season | Tier | Division | Place | Copa del Rey |
|---|---|---|---|---|
| 2019–20 | 5 | 1ª Ext. | 9th | |
| 2020–21 | 5 | 1ª Ext. | 4th | |
| 2021–22 | 6 | 1ª Ext. | 5th | |
| 2022–23 | 6 | 1ª Ext. | 6th | |
| 2023–24 | 6 | 1ª Ext. | 6th | |
| 2024–25 | 6 | 1ª Ext. | 6th | |
| 2025–26 | 6 | 1ª Ext. | 4th | |
| 2026–27 | 6 | 1ª Ext. | | Preliminary |

- 7 seasons in Tercera División
