= Juan Emilio Mojica =

Dominican Republic football manager

Personal information
- Date of birth: April 30, 1962 (age 64)
- Place of birth: Dominican Republic

Managerial career
- Years: Team
- 2000–2002: Dominican Republic
- 2008–2009: Dominican Republic

Juan Emilio Mojica (born April 30, 1962) is a Dominican Republic professional football manager. From 2000 to 2002 and from January 2008 to December 2009 he coached Dominican Republic national football team.
