= Brayan Ademán =

Dominican Republic footballer

Personal information
- Full name: Brayan Ademán Ruiz
- Date of birth: 22 September 2002 (age 24)
- Place of birth: Laredo, Spain
- Height: 1.94 m (6 ft 4 in)
- Position: Centre-back

Team information
- Current team: Laredo
- Number: 4

Youth career
- –2021: Atlético Perines

Senior career*
Years	Team	Apps	(Gls)
2021–2025	Rayo Cantabria	2	(0)
2021–2022	→ Escobedo (loan)	30	(4)
2022–2023	→ Tropezón (loan)	27	(2)
2024	→ Laredo (loan)	17	(1)
2025	→ Escobedo (loan)	16	(0)
2025-	Gimnástica	0	(0)

International career^{‡}
2024–	Dominican Republic	5	(0)
- * Club domestic league appearances and goals as of 25 May 2025 ‡ National team caps and goals as of 10 September 2024

Brayan Ademán Ruiz (born 22 September 2002) is a footballer who plays as a centre-back for Tercera Federación club Laredo, on loan from Segunda Federación side Rayo Cantabria. Born in Spain, he plays for the Dominican Republic national team.

== International career ==
Ademán made his debut for the senior Dominican Republic national team on 23 March 2024 in a friendly against Aruba.
