= Abel Conejo =

Spanish footballer

Personal information
- Full name: Abel Antonio Conejo Olaya
- Date of birth: 21 March 1998 (age 28)
- Place of birth: Valladolid, Spain
- Height: 1.76 m (5 ft 9 in)
- Position: Midfielder

Team information
- Current team: Atlético Tordesillas

Youth career
- 2009–2017: Valladolid

Senior career*
Years	Team	Apps	(Gls)
2017–2019	Atlético Tordesillas	48	(6)
2019–2020	Numancia B	27	(4)
2020	Numancia	1	(0)
2020–2021	Zamora	10	(0)
2021–2022	Burgos B	30	(0)
2022–2023	Cristo Atlético	34	(0)
2023–	Atlético Tordesillas	39	(0)
- * Club domestic league appearances and goals as of 6 October 2024

Abel Antonio Conejo Olaya (born 21 March 1998) is a Spanish footballer who plays as a central midfielder for Atlético Tordesillas.

== Club career ==
Conejo was born in Valladolid, Castile and León, and spent eight years at Real Valladolid's youth setup before leaving in April 2017. He joined Tercera División side Atlético Tordesillas in August, and made his senior debut on 27 August by starting in a 1–1 home draw against CD Cristo Atlético.

Conejo scored his first senior goal on 9 September 2017, netting his team's second in a 2–2 home draw against Unionistas de Salamanca CF. In July 2019, after being an undisputed starter, he moved to CD Numancia and was initially assigned to the reserves also in the fourth division.

Conejo made his first team debut with the Soria outfit on 17 July 2020, coming on as a late substitute for Curro Sánchez in a 0–3 loss at SD Huesca in the Segunda División championship. On 5 August, he signed for Zamora CF, newly promoted to Segunda División B.
