= CD Baztán =

Association football club in Spain

Baztán
- Full name: Club Deportivo Baztán Kirol Elkartea
- Founded: 1925
- Ground: Giltxaurdi, Elizondo, Navarre, Spain
- Capacity: 1,000
- President: Txema Garaikoetxea
- Manager: Josema Osacar
- League: Primera Autonómica
- 2025–26: Primera Autonómica, 4th of 18
- Website: https://cdbaztan.com/
Home colours	Away colours

Club Deportivo Baztán Kirol Elkartea is a Spanish football club based in Cirauqui, in the autonomous community of Navarre. Founded in 1925, the club play in the Primera Autonómica, holding home matches at the Giltxaurdi.

== Season to season ==
Season	Tier	Division	Place	Copa del Rey
1943–44	4	1ª Reg.	2nd	
1944–45	4	1ª Reg.	3rd	
1945–46	4	1ª Reg.	1st	
1946–47	4	1ª Reg.	6th	
1947–48	4	1ª Reg.	6th	
1948–49	4	1ª Reg.	12th	
1949–50	4	1ª Reg.	6th	
1950–51	DNP			
1951–52	DNP			
1952–53	DNP			
1953–54	5	2ª Reg.	2nd	
1954–55	5	2ª Reg.	6th	
1955–1962	DNP			
1962–63	5	2ª Reg.	2nd	
1963–1968	DNP			
1968–69	5	2ª Reg.	3rd	
1969–70	5	2ª Reg.	12th	
1970–71	6	3ª Reg.	1st	
1971–72	5	2ª Reg.	8th	
1972–73	5	2ª Reg.	8th	

Season	Tier	Division	Place	Copa del Rey
1973–74	5	2ª Reg.	10th	
1974–75	5	1ª Reg.	11th	
1975–76	5	1ª Reg.	6th	
1976–77	5	1ª Reg.	2nd	
1977–78	6	1ª Reg.	6th	
1978–79	6	1ª Reg.	2nd	
1979–80	6	1ª Reg.	1st	
1980–81	5	Reg. Pref.	8th	
1981–82	5	Reg. Pref.	10th	
1982–83	5	Reg. Pref.	4th	
1983–84	5	Reg. Pref.	6th	
1984–85	5	Reg. Pref.	15th	
1985–86	5	Reg. Pref.	18th	
1986–87	5	Reg. Pref.	6th	
1987–88	5	Reg. Pref.	5th	
1988–89	5	Reg. Pref.	2nd	
1989–90	4	3ª	19th	
1990–91	5	Reg. Pref.	7th	
1991–92	5	Reg. Pref.	4th	
1992–93	5	Reg. Pref.	1st	

Season	Tier	Division	Place	Copa del Rey
1993–94	4	3ª	6th	
1994–95	4	3ª	8th	
1995–96	4	3ª	13th	
1996–97	4	3ª	18th	
1997–98	5	Reg. Pref.	6th	
1998–99	5	Reg. Pref.	2nd	
1999–2000	4	3ª	20th	
2000–01	5	Reg. Pref.	18th	
2001–02	6	1ª Reg.	7th	
2002–03	6	1ª Reg.	4th	
2003–04	6	1ª Reg.	10th	
2004–05	6	1ª Reg.	2nd	
2005–06	6	1ª Reg.	3rd	
2006–07	6	1ª Reg.	4th	
2007–08	6	1ª Reg.	2nd	
2008–09	5	Reg. Pref.	13th	
2009–10	5	Reg. Pref.	16th	
2010–11	6	1ª Reg.	1st	
2011–12	5	Reg. Pref.	12th	
2012–13	5	Reg. Pref.	7th	

Season	Tier	Division	Place	Copa del Rey
2013–14	5	Reg. Pref.	12th	
2014–15	5	Reg. Pref.	3rd	
2015–16	4	3ª	18th	
2016–17	5	1ª Aut.	4th	
2017–18	4	3ª	12th	
2018–19	4	3ª	9th	
2019–20	4	3ª	19th	
2020–21	4	3ª	8th / 7th	
2021–22	6	1ª Aut.	4th	
2022–23	6	1ª Aut.	9th	
2023–24	6	1ª Aut.	5th	
2024–25	6	1ª Aut.	10th	Preliminary
2025–26	6	1ª Aut.	4th	
2026–27	6	1ª Aut.		Preliminary
