= Dominican Republic national football team =

Men's association football team

Dominican Republic
- Nickname: Quisqueyanos
- Association: Federación Dominicana de Fútbol (FDF)
- Confederation: CONCACAF (North America)
- Sub-confederation: CFU (Caribbean)
- Head coach: Marcelo Neveleff
- Captain: Jean Carlos López
- Most caps: Jean Carlos López (74)
- Top scorer: Dorny Romero (29)
- Home stadium: Various
- FIFA code: DOM
| First colours | Second colours |

FIFA ranking
- Current: 135 ▲9 (7 October 2026)
- Highest: 76 (October 2013)
- Lowest: 189 (December 2009)

First international
- Dominican Republic 0–8 Haiti (Santo Domingo, Dominican Republic; 21 May 1967)

Biggest win
- Dominican Republic 17–0 British Virgin Islands (San Cristóbal, Dominican Republic; 14 October 2010)

Biggest defeat
- Trinidad and Tobago 9–0 Dominican Republic (Port of Spain, Trinidad and Tobago; 8 October 2008)

CONCACAF Gold Cup
- Appearances: 1 (first in 2025)
- Best result: Group stage (2025)

CONCACAF Nations League
- Appearances: 5 (first in 2019–20)
- Best result: 9th (2026–27)

The Dominican Republic men's national football team (Spanish: Selección nacional de fútbol masculina de la República Dominicana) represents the Dominican Republic in men's international football, and is governed by the Dominican Football Federation (Spanish: Federación Dominicana de Fútbol), the governing body for football in the Dominican Republic founded in 1953. It has been a full member of FIFA since 1958, a full member of CONCACAF since 1964, and is also a member of CFU in the Caribbean Zone.

The Dominican Republic has never qualified for the FIFA World Cup, but has qualified once for the CONCACAF Gold Cup in 2025. It has participated once in League A and four times in League B of the CONCACAF Nations League.

The Dominican Republic's debut in international competitions was in the 1968 CONCACAF Pre-Olympic Tournament qualification, and its first appearance in World Cup qualifiers was in the 1977 CONCACAF Championship qualification, which also served as the CONCACAF qualifiers for the 1978 FIFA World Cup. The team's first victory was by defeating Puerto Rico 5–0 at the 1970 Central American and Caribbean Games.

== History ==
The Dominican Football Federation was founded in 1953 and joined FIFA in 1959. The national team played their first games in May 1967 – a two-legged qualifier against Haiti for a place in the football at the 1968 Summer Olympics of Mexico. The first leg was played at home on 21 May and Haiti won 8–0. The second leg in Haiti was won by the hosts 6–0 on 27 May, as Haiti went through 14–0 on aggregate.

The Dominican Republic did not play another match until March 1970, when they entered at the 1970 Central American and Caribbean Games in Panama. They were placed in a group with Puerto Rico and Venezuela. The Dominican Republic lost 5–0 to Venezuela on 4 March, then gained their first ever win on 6 March by beating Puerto Rico 5–0. They did not advance to the next round.

In 1971 the Dominican Republic entered the 1971 Pan American Games in Colombia and were drawn in a group against the Bahamas and Canada. They lost 4–2 to the Bahamas on 31 July and 4–0 to Canada on 2 August and were knocked out.

The team did not play again until 16 December 1973, when they lost 1–0 away to Venezuela. In 1974 the Dominican Republic held the Central American and Caribbean Games, and lost their first match 3–2 to Bermuda on 28 February. On 2 March the team lost 1–0 to Mexico, before beating the Bahamas 2–0 on 4 March. In the final group game on 8 March the Dominican Republic lost 3–2 to Panama and were knocked out. In 1986 they had their best result in the Central American and Caribbean games finishing 3rd

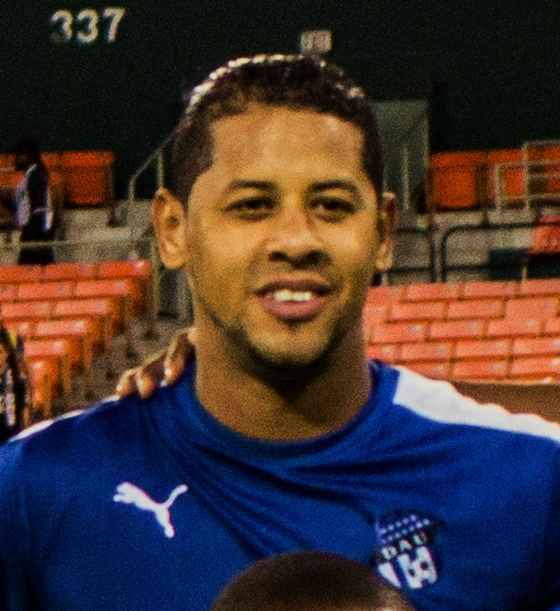
Miguel Lloyd played numerous games for the Dominican Republic

In 2012, the Dominicans were able to qualify for the 2012 Caribbean Cup. On 7 December they beat hosts Antigua and Barbuda 2–1 but fell 2–1 against Haiti and Trinidad and Tobago.

In 2024, Dominican Republic won all of their 2024–25 CONCACAF Nations League B matches against Bermuda, Dominica and Antigua and Barbuda which sees them promoted to League A as group leaders and also qualifying to the nations first continent tournament in their history, the 2025 CONCACAF Gold Cup.

== Team image ==
=== Kit sponsorship ===
| Kit supplier | Period |
|---|---|
| (Dominican Republic) Drako | 2006 |
| (United Kingdom) Umbro | 2007–2010 |
| (Germany) Adidas | 2011–2013 |
| (Peru) Walon | 2014–2016 |
| None | 2017–2018 |
| (Italy) Macron | 2019–2024 |
| (Mexico) Silver Sport | 2024–2026 |
| (United States) Reebok | 2027– |

== Home stadium ==
The Dominican Republic national team uses the following stadiums for their home games: Estadio Cibao FC, Estadio Olímpico Félix Sánchez, and Estadio Panamericano.

== Results and fixtures ==
The following is a list of match results in the last 12 months, as well as any future matches that have been scheduled.

Win Draw Loss Fixture

=== 2025 ===
| 12 November 2025–26 CONCACAF Series | Dominican Republic | 2–0 | Saint Vincent and the Grenadines | Santiago, Dominican Republic |
| 20:00 UTC−4 | Mörschel 17',Japa 57' | Report | | Stadium: Estadio Cibao FC |

| 18 November 2025–26 CONCACAF Series | Dominican Republic | 0–0 | Martinique | Santiago, Dominican Republic |
| 19:30 UTC−4 | | | | Stadium: Estadio Cibao FC |

=== 2026 ===
| 26 March 2025–26 CONCACAF Series | Dominican Republic | 2–2 | El Salvador | Santiago, Dominican Republic |
| 20:00 UTC−4 | Firpo 15'; Romero 90+4' (pen.) | Report | Ordaz 62', 78' | Stadium: Estadio Cibao FC; Referee: Oliver Vergara (Panama) |

| 29 March 2025–26 CONCACAF Series | Dominican Republic | 1–1 | Cuba | Santiago, Dominican Republic |
| 18:00 UTC−4 | Romero 53' | Report | D. Reyes 51' | Stadium: Estadio Cibao FC; Referee: Roger Mélendez (Nicaragua) |

| 3 June Friendly | Panama | 4–2 | Dominican Republic | Panama City, Panama |
| 17:45 UTC−5 | T. Rodríguez 16'; Griffith 44'; Waterman 57'; Barría 89' | Report | Díaz 47'; Japa 67' | Stadium: Estadio Rommel Fernández; Referee: Nelson Salgado (Honduras) |

| 24 September 2026-27 CONCACAF Nations League A Group Stage | Dominican Republic | 3–2 | Nicaragua | Santiago, Dominican Republic |
| 20:00 UTC−4 | Mörshel 5'; Díaz 15'; Rosario 90+7' | Report | Pérez 40'; Bonilla 84' | Stadium: Estadio Cibao FC; Referee: Selvin Brown (Honduras) |

| 27 September 2026-27 CONCACAF Nations League A Group Stage | Trinidad and Tobago | 1–2 | Dominican Republic | Port of Spain, Trinidad and Tobago |
| 21:00 UTC−4 | Phillips 37' | Report | Mörschel 42'; Díaz 50' | Stadium: Hasely Crawford Stadium; Referee: Reon Radix (Grenada) |

| 1 October 2026-27 CONCACAF Nations League A Group Stage | Dominican Republic | 1–4 | Haiti | Santo Domingo, Dominican Republic |
| 20:00 UTC−4 | Romero 55' | Report | Deedson 9' Isidor 51', 67' Fortuné 76' | Stadium: Estadio Olímpico Félix Sánchez |

| 4 October 2026-27 CONCACAF Nations League A Group Stage | Nicaragua | 1–2 | Dominican Republic | Managua, Nicaragua |
| 20:00 UTC−6 | Moreno 53' | Report | Mörshel 58' (pen.); Breton 66' | Stadium: Estadio Nacional de Fútbol |

| 17 November Friendly | Uruguay | v | Dominican Republic | Maldonado, Uruguay |
| 20:30 UTC−3 | | | | Stadium: Estadio Domingo Burgueño |

== Coaching staff ==
| Position | Name | Nationality |
|---|---|---|
| Head coach | Marcelo Neveleff | Argentina |
| Assistant coach | Inaki Goikoetxea | Spain |
| Assistant coach | Juan Francisco Roldán | Guatemala |
| Goalkeeper trainer | Dani Gimenez | Spain |
| Fitness trainer | Juan Manuel Alcedo | Spain |
| Athletic trainer | Juanma Alcedo | Spain |

=== Coaching history ===
- (Bolivia) Fortunato Quispe Mendoza (1967–1974)
- (Argentina) Carlos Cabañés (1975)
- (Brazil) Décio Leite Leal (1986–1989)
- (Germany) Bernhard Zgoll (1991–1992)
- (Germany) Manfred Höner (1993–1994)
- (Dominican Republic) Juan Carretero (1995–1999)
- (Dominican Republic) Juan Emilio Mojica (2000–2002)
- (Spain) Carmelo Oliva (2003)
- (Cuba) William Bennett (2004–2005)
- (Serbia) Ljubomir Crnokrak (2005–2007)
- (Dominican Republic) Juan Emilio Mojica (2008–2009)
- (Cuba) Clemente Domingo Hernández (2010–2014)
- (Colombia) José Eugenio Hernández (2015)
- (Dominican Republic) Juan Emilio Mojica (2015)
- (Spain) Roberto Díaz Bernabé (2015–2016)
- (Uruguay) Orlando Capellino (2017–2019)
- (Spain) David González (2019–2020)
- (Mexico) Jacques Passy (2020–2021)
- (Spain) Iñaki Bea (2022)
- (Cuba) Walter Benítez (2022–2023)
- (Argentina) Marcelo Neveleff (2023–present)

== Players ==
=== Current squad ===
The following players have been called up for the 2026–27 CONCACAF Nations League A matches against Nicaragua on 24 September and 4 October 2026, Trinidad and Tobago on 27 September 2026, and Haiti on 1 October 2026.

Caps and goals are correct as of 4 October 2026, after the match against Nicaragua.

| No. | Pos. | Player | Date of birth (age) | Caps | Goals | Club |
|---|---|---|---|---|---|---|
| 1 | GK | Xavier Valdez | 23 November 2003 (age 22) | 27 | 0 | (United States Soccer Federation) Huntsville City FC |
| 12 | GK | Edwin Frías | 18 May 2006 (age 20) | 0 | 0 | (Dominican Football Federation) Cibao |
| 22 | GK | Pedro Espinal | 30 August 2001 (age 25) | 0 | 0 | (Dominican Football Federation) Delfines |
| 2 | DF | Jeremy Báez | 21 November 1999 (age 26) | 11 | 0 | (Dominican Football Federation) Salcedo FC |
| 3 | DF | Junior Firpo | 22 August 1996 (age 30) | 18 | 5 | (Royal Spanish Football Federation) Betis |
| 4 | DF | Edgar Pujol | 7 August 2004 (age 22) | 12 | 0 | (Royal Spanish Football Federation) Racing de Ferrol |
| 5 | DF | Noah Dollenmayer | 26 October 1999 (age 27) | 16 | 2 | (United States Soccer Federation) El Paso Locomotive FC |
| 21 | DF | Juan Castillo | 13 January 2000 (age 26) | 14 | 0 | (Royal Dutch Football Association) RKC Waalwijk |
| 23 | DF | Luiyi de Lucas | 31 August 1994 (age 32) | 33 | 1 | (Cyprus Football Association) Krasava Ypsonas |
| 2 | DF | Brian López | 20 November 1999 (age 26) | 11 | 0 | (Dominican Football Federation) Moca FC |
| 6 | MF | Pablo Rosario | 7 January 1997 (age 29) | 14 | 1 | (Portuguese Football Federation) Porto |
| 8 | MF | Heinz Mörschel | 24 August 1997 (age 29) | 27 | 12 | (Portuguese Football Federation) Vizela |
| 13 | MF | Yordy Álvarez | 12 March 2005 (age 21) | 4 | 0 | (Bolivian Football Federation) Real Tomayapo |
| 14 | MF | Jean Carlos López | 9 November 1993 (age 33) | 64 | 4 | (Dominican Football Federation) Cibao |
| 16 | MF | Daniel Flores | 11 November 2000 (age 26) | 15 | 0 | (Dominican Football Federation) Salcedo FC |
| 20 | MF | Lucas Bretón | 20 November 2006 (age 19) | 17 | 1 | (Royal Spanish Football Federation) Atlético Malagueño |
| 7 | FW | Juanca Pineda | 12 January 2000 (age 26) | 22 | 0 | (Moldovan Football Federation) Sheriff |
| 9 | FW | Mariano Díaz | 1 August 1993 (age 33) | 7 | 5 | (Royal Spanish Football Federation) Alavés |
| 10 | FW | Javier Roces | 10 September 2005 (age 21) | 1 | 0 | (Dominican Football Federation) Cibao |
| 10 | FW | Edison Azcona | 21 November 2003 (age 22) | 20 | 1 | (United States Soccer Federation) Las Vegas Lights |
| 19 | FW | Peter González | 25 July 2002 (age 24) | 13 | 2 | (Polish Football Association) Górnik |
| 17 | FW | Dorny Romero | 24 January 1998 (age 28) | 49 | 28 | (Bolivian Football Federation) Bolívar |
| | FW | Edarlyn Reyes | 30 September 1997 (age 29) | 43 | 5 | (Russian Football Union) Arsenal Tula |

=== Recent callups ===
The following players have been called up for the team in the last 12 months and are still available for selection.

| Pos. | Player | Date of birth (age) | Caps | Goals | Club | Latest call-up |
|---|---|---|---|---|---|---|
| GK | Miguel Lloyd | 23 October 1982 (age 44) | 45 | 0 | (Dominican Republic) Cibao | v. Panama, 3 June 2026 |
| GK | Anthony Núñez | 14 October 2005 (age 21) | 0 | 0 | (England) Mansfield Town | v. Panama, 3 June 2026 |
| DF | Joao Urbáez | 24 July 2002 (age 24) | 16 | 1 | (Dominican Republic) Cibao | v. Panama, 3 June 2026 |
| DF | Israel Boatwright | 2 June 2005 (age 21) | 0 | 0 | (United States) Inter Miami CF | v. Panama, 3 June 2026 |
| DF | Alejandro López | 28 January 2009 (age 17) | 2 | 0 | (Spain) Rayo Vallecano | v. Panama, 3 June 2026 |
| DF | Brayan Ademán | 22 September 2002 (age 24) | 6 | 0 | (Spain) Gimnástica Torrelavega | v. Panama, 3 June 2026 |
| DF | Marlon Mena | 5 October 2006 (age 20) | 3 | 0 | (Italy) Arezzo | 2025–26 CONCACAF Series |
| DF | Charbel Wehbe | 8 May 2004 (age 22) | 6 | 0 | (Spain) Castellón B | v. Martinique, 18 November 2025 |
| DF | Joselvis Martínez | 24 May 2005 (age 21) | 0 | 0 | (Dominican Republic) Delfines delEste | v. Martinique, 18 November 2025 |
| MF | Alessandro Ovalle | 19 December 2005 (age 20) | 2 | 0 | (Italy) Sant'Angelo | v. Panama, 3 June 2026 |
| MF | Manny Rodríguez | 23 May 1998 (age 28) | 8 | 1 | (Netherlands) Heracles | v. Panama, 3 June 2026 |
| MF | Ronaldo Vásquez | 30 June 1999 (age 27) | 46 | 7 | (Azerbaijan) Sumgayit | 2025–26 CONCACAF Series |
| MF | Omar de la Cruz | 5 July 2000 (age 26) | 6 | 0 | (Dominican Republic) Cibao | v. Martinique, 18 November 2025 |
| FW | Carlos Sarante | 3 June 2006 (age 20) | 1 | 0 | (Israel) Hapoel Acre | 2025–26 CONCACAF Series |
| FW | Erick Japa | 6 April 1999 (age 27) | 20 | 4 | (Guatemala) Municipal | v. Panama, 3 June 2026 |
| FW | Adrián García | 13 February 2009 (age 17) | 0 | 0 | (Spain) Leganés | v. Panama, 3 June 2026 |
| FW | Anyelo Gómez | 2 January 2003 (age 23) | 0 | 0 | (Dominican Republic) Salcedo | v. Panama, 3 June 2026 |
| FW | Óscar Ureña | 31 May 2003 (age 23) | 3 | 0 | (Spain) Zaragoza | v. Martinique, 18 November 2025 |
| FW | Edwarlyn Reyes | 2 May 2004 (age 22) | 0 | 0 | (Dominican Republic) Cibao | v. Martinique, 18 November 2025 |
Notes: ^{INJ} = Withdrew due to injury; ^{PRE} = Preliminary squad; ^{RET} = Retired from the national team; ^{SUS} = Serving suspension; ^{WD} = Player withdrew from the squad due to non-injury issue.

== Records ==
As of 1 October 2026
Players in bold are still active with the Dominican Republic.

=== Most appearances ===
| Rank | Player | Caps | Goals | Career |
|---|---|---|---|---|
| 1 | **Jean Carlos López** | 65 | 4 | 2013–present |
| 2 | **Dorny Romero** | 49 | 28 | 2017–present |
| 3 | **César García** | 46 | 4 | 2010–present |
| 3 | **Ronaldo Vásquez** | 46 | 7 | 2017–present |
| 5 | Miguel Lloyd | 45 | 0 | 2004–2026 |
| 6 | **Edarlyn Reyes** | 39 | 5 | 2018–present |
| 7 | Jonathan Faña | 38 | 19 | 2006–2022 |
| 8 | Rafael Flores | 36 | 0 | 2008–2021 |
| 8 | Domingo Peralta | 36 | 8 | 2010–2021 |
| 10 | Kerbi Rodríguez | 33 | 8 | 2006–2015 |

=== Top goalscorers ===
| Rank | Player | Goals | Caps | Ratio | Career |
|---|---|---|---|---|---|
| 1 | **Dorny Romero** | 28 | 49 | 0.57 | 2019–present |
| 2 | Jonathan Faña | 19 | 38 | 0.5 | 2006–2022 |
| 3 | **Heinz Mörschel** | 12 | 27 | 0.44 | 2023–present |
| 4 | Erick Ozuna | 9 | 23 | 0.39 | 2010–2019 |
| 5 | Darly Batista | 8 | 13 | 0.62 | 2006–2019 |
| 5 | Kerbi Rodríguez | 8 | 33 | 0.24 | 2006–2015 |
| 5 | Domingo Peralta | 8 | 36 | 0.22 | 2010–2021 |
| 8 | Inoel Navarro | 7 | 15 | 0.47 | 2010–2015 |
| 8 | Omar Zapata | 7 | 19 | 0.37 | 1992–2004 |
| 8 | **Ronaldo Vásquez** | 7 | 46 | 0.15 | 2017–present |

== Competitive record ==
=== FIFA World Cup ===
| FIFA World Cup | | | | | | | | | Qualification | | | | | |
| Year | Round | Position | Pld | W | D | L | GF | GA | Pld | W | D | L | GF | GA |
|---|---|---|---|---|---|---|---|---|---|---|---|---|---|---|
| 1930 to 1958 | Not a FIFA member | | | | | | | | Not a FIFA member | | | | | |
| 1962 to 1974 | Did not enter | | | | | | | | Did not enter | | | | | |
| (Argentina) 1978 | Did not qualify | | | | | | | | 2 | 0 | 0 | 2 | 0 | 6 |
| 1982 to 1990 | Did not enter | | | | | | | | Declined participation | | | | | |
| (United States) 1994 | Did not qualify | | | | | | | | 2 | 0 | 1 | 1 | 2 | 3 |
| (France) 1998 | Did not qualify | | | | | | | | 6 | 3 | 1 | 2 | 9 | 16 |
| (South Korea) (Japan) 2002 | Did not qualify | | | | | | | | 4 | 2 | 0 | 2 | 6 | 5 |
| (Germany) 2006 | Did not qualify | | | | | | | | 4 | 1 | 1 | 2 | 6 | 6 |
| (South Africa) 2010 | Did not qualify | | | | | | | | 1 | 0 | 0 | 1 | 0 | 1 |
| (Brazil) 2014 | Did not qualify | | | | | | | | 8 | 4 | 2 | 2 | 18 | 8 |
| (Russia) 2018 | Did not qualify | | | | | | | | 2 | 0 | 0 | 2 | 1 | 5 |
| (Qatar) 2022 | Did not qualify | | | | | | | | 4 | 2 | 1 | 1 | 8 | 4 |
| (Canada) (Mexico) (United States) 2026 | Did not qualify | | | | | | | | 4 | 2 | 0 | 2 | 11 | 5 |
| (Morocco) (Portugal) (Spain) 2030 | To be determined | | | | | | | | To be determined | | | | | |
| (Saudi Arabia) 2034 | To be determined | | | | | | | | To be determined | | | | | |
| Total | | 0/16 | | | | | | | 37 | 14 | 6 | 17 | 61 | 59 |

=== CONCACAF Gold Cup ===
| CONCACAF Championship & Gold Cup record | | | | | | | | | Qualification record | | | | | |
| Year | Round | Position | Pld | W | D | L | GF | GA | Pld | W | D | L | GF | GA |
|---|---|---|---|---|---|---|---|---|---|---|---|---|---|---|
| (El Salvador) 1963 | Did not enter | | | | | | | | Did not enter | | | | | |
| (Guatemala) 1965 | Did not enter | | | | | | | | Did not enter | | | | | |
| (Honduras) 1967 | Did not enter | | | | | | | | Did not enter | | | | | |
| (Costa Rica) 1969 | Did not enter | | | | | | | | Did not enter | | | | | |
| (Trinidad and Tobago) 1971 | Did not enter | | | | | | | | Did not enter | | | | | |
| (Haiti) 1973 | Did not enter | | | | | | | | Did not enter | | | | | |
| (Mexico) 1977 | Did not qualify | | | | | | | | 2 | 0 | 0 | 2 | 0 | 6 |
| (Honduras) 1981 | Did not enter | | | | | | | | Did not enter | | | | | |
| 1985 | Did not enter | | | | | | | | Did not enter | | | | | |
| 1989 | Did not enter | | | | | | | | Did not enter | | | | | |
| (United States) 1991 | Did not qualify | | | | | | | | 5 | 1 | 2 | 2 | 5 | 13 |
| (Mexico) (United States) 1993 | Did not qualify | | | | | | | | 2 | 1 | 0 | 1 | 5 | 4 |
| (United States) 1996 | Did not qualify | | | | | | | | 3 | 1 | 0 | 2 | 4 | 6 |
| (United States) 1998 | Did not enter | | | | | | | | Did not enter | | | | | |
| (United States) 2000 | Did not qualify | | | | | | | | 3 | 1 | 1 | 1 | 2 | 4 |
| (United States) 2002 | Did not qualify | | | | | | | | 2 | 1 | 0 | 1 | 4 | 4 |
| (Mexico) (United States) 2003 | Did not qualify | | | | | | | | 5 | 2 | 0 | 3 | 12 | 9 |
| (United States) 2005 | Did not enter | | | | | | | | Did not enter | | | | | |
| (United States) 2007 | Did not enter | | | | | | | | Did not enter | | | | | |
| (United States) 2009 | Did not enter | | | | | | | | Did not enter | | | | | |
| (United States) 2011 | Did not qualify | | | | | | | | 2 | 1 | 0 | 1 | 17 | 1 |
| (United States) 2013 | Did not qualify | | | | | | | | 9 | 4 | 3 | 2 | 14 | 10 |
| (Canada) (United States) 2015 | Did not qualify | | | | | | | | 6 | 2 | 1 | 3 | 15 | 11 |
| (United States) 2017 | Did not qualify | | | | | | | | 6 | 3 | 0 | 3 | 7 | 9 |
| (Costa Rica) (Jamaica) (United States) 2019 | Did not qualify | | | | | | | | 4 | 2 | 0 | 2 | 9 | 4 |
| (United States) 2021 | Did not qualify | | | | | | | | 6 | 2 | 1 | 3 | 5 | 5 |
| (Canada) (United States) 2023 | Did not qualify | | | | | | | | 6 | 2 | 2 | 2 | 8 | 7 |
| (Canada) (United States) 2025 | Group stage | 12th | 3 | 0 | 1 | 2 | 3 | 5 | 6 | 6 | 0 | 0 | 27 | 4 |
| Total | Group stage | 1/28 | 3 | 0 | 1 | 2 | 3 | 5 | 67 | 29 | 10 | 28 | 134 | 97 |

=== CONCACAF Nations League ===
CONCACAF Nations League record
| League | | | | | | | | | | Finals | | | | | | | | |
| Season | Division | Group | Pld | W | D | L | GF | GA | P/R | Finals | Result | Pld | W | D | L | GF | GA | Squad |
|---|---|---|---|---|---|---|---|---|---|---|---|---|---|---|---|---|---|---|
| 2019–20 | B | B | 6 | 2 | 1 | 3 | 5 | 5 | Same position | (United States) 2021 | Ineligible | | | | | | | |
| 2022–23 | B | D | 6 | 2 | 2 | 2 | 8 | 7 | Same position | (United States) 2023 | Ineligible | | | | | | | |
| 2023–24 | B | B | 6 | 3 | 1 | 2 | 14 | 6 | Same position | (United States) 2024 | Ineligible | | | | | | | |
| 2024–25 | B | D | 6 | 6 | 0 | 0 | 27 | 4 | ▲ | (United States) 2025 | Ineligible | | | | | | | |
| Total | — | — | 24 | 13 | 4 | 7 | 54 | 22 | — | Total | 0 Titles | — | — | — | — | — | — | — |

CONCACAF Nations League history
| First match | Montserrat 2–1 Dominican Republic (7 September 2019; Lookout, Montserrat) |
| Biggest win | Barbados 0–5 Dominican Republic (13 October 2023; Wildey, Barbados); Antigua and Barbuda 0–5 Dominican Republic (12 October 2024; Devonshire Parish, Bermuda); Dominican Republic 5–0 Antigua and Barbuda (15 October 2024; Devonshire Parish, Bermuda); Dominica 1–6 Dominican Republic (16 November 2024; Santiago de los Caballeros, Dominican Republic); Dominican Republic 6–1 Bermuda (19 November 2024; Santiago de los Caballeros, Dominican Republic) |
| Biggest defeat | El Salvador 2–0 Dominican Republic (19 November 2019; San Salvador, El Salvador); Guatemala 2–0 Dominican Republic (13 June 2022; Guatemala City, Guatemala) |
| Best result | — |
| Worst result | — |

=== CFU Caribbean Cup ===
| CFU Championship & Caribbean Cup record | | | | | | | | | Qualification record | | | | | |
| Year | Round | Position | Pld | W | D | L | GF | GA | Pld | W | D | L | GF | GA |
| (Trinidad and Tobago) 1978 | Did not enter | | | | | | | | Did not enter | | | | | |
| (Suriname) 1979 | Did not enter | | | | | | | | Did not enter | | | | | |
| (Puerto Rico) 1981 | Did not enter | | | | | | | | Did not enter | | | | | |
| (French Guiana) 1983 | Did not enter | | | | | | | | Did not enter | | | | | |
| (Barbados) 1985 | Did not enter | | | | | | | | Did not enter | | | | | |
| (Martinique) 1988 | Did not enter | | | | | | | | Did not enter | | | | | |
| (Barbados) 1989 | Did not enter | | | | | | | | Did not enter | | | | | |
| (Trinidad and Tobago) 1990 | Did not enter | | | | | | | | Did not enter | | | | | |
| (Jamaica) 1991 | Group stage | 6th | 3 | 0 | 1 | 2 | 1 | 11 | 2 | 1 | 1 | 0 | 4 | 2 |
| (Trinidad and Tobago) 1992 | Did not enter | | | | | | | | Did not enter | | | | | |
| (Jamaica) 1993 | Did not qualify | | | | | | | | 2 | 1 | 0 | 1 | 5 | 4 |
| (Trinidad and Tobago) 1994 | Did not qualify | | | | | | | | 1 | 0 | 0 | 1 | 0 | 1 |
| (Cayman Islands) (Jamaica) 1995 | Did not qualify | | | | | | | | 3 | 1 | 0 | 2 | 4 | 6 |
| (Trinidad and Tobago) 1996 | Did not qualify | | | | | | | | 2 | 0 | 1 | 1 | 1 | 7 |
| (Antigua and Barbuda) (Saint Kitts and Nevis) 1997 | Withdrew | | | | | | | | Withdrew | | | | | |
| (Jamaica) (Trinidad and Tobago) 1998 | Did not qualify | | | | | | | | 2 | 1 | 0 | 1 | 3 | 6 |
| (Trinidad and Tobago) 1999 | Did not qualify | | | | | | | | 3 | 1 | 1 | 1 | 2 | 4 |
| (Trinidad and Tobago) 2001 | Did not qualify | | | | | | | | 2 | 1 | 0 | 1 | 4 | 4 |
| (Barbados) 2005 | Withdrew | | | | | | | | Withdrew | | | | | |
| (Trinidad and Tobago) 2007 | Withdrew | | | | | | | | 6 | 3 | 0 | 3 | 12 | 11 |
| (Jamaica) 2008 | Did not enter | | | | | | | | Did not enter | | | | | |
| (Martinique) 2010 | Did not qualify | | | | | | | | 2 | 1 | 0 | 1 | 17 | 1 |
| (Antigua and Barbuda) 2012 | Group stage | 5th | 3 | 1 | 0 | 2 | 3 | 4 | 6 | 4 | 2 | 0 | 11 | 5 |
| (Jamaica) 2014 | Did not qualify | | | | | | | | 6 | 2 | 1 | 3 | 15 | 11 |
| (Martinique) 2017 | Did not qualify | | | | | | | | 6 | 3 | 0 | 3 | 7 | 9 |
| Total | Group stage | 2/25 | 6 | 1 | 1 | 4 | 4 | 16 | 43 | 19 | 6 | 18 | 85 | 71 |

=== Pan American Games ===
Pan American Games record
| Year | Round | Position | Pld | W | D | L | GF | GA |
|---|---|---|---|---|---|---|---|---|
| (Argentina) 1951 | Did not enter | | | | | | | |
| (Mexico) 1955 | Did not enter | | | | | | | |
| (United States) 1959 | Did not enter | | | | | | | |
| (Brazil) 1963 | Did not enter | | | | | | | |
| (Canada) 1967 | Did not enter | | | | | | | |
| (Colombia) 1971 | Preliminary round | 12th | 3 | 0 | 0 | 3 | 2 | 12 |
| (Mexico) 1975 | Did not enter | | | | | | | |
| (Puerto Rico) 1979 | Preliminary round | 12th | 2 | 0 | 0 | 2 | 0 | 7 |
| (Venezuela) 1983 | Did not enter | | | | | | | |
| (United States) 1987 | Did not enter | | | | | | | |
| (Cuba) 1991 | Did not enter | | | | | | | |
| (Argentina) 1995 | Did not enter | | | | | | | |
| (Canada) 1999 | Did not enter | | | | | | | |
| (Dominican Republic) 2003 | Preliminary round | 6th | 3 | 0 | 1 | 2 | 2 | 10 |
| (Brazil) 2007 | Did not enter | | | | | | | |
| (Mexico) 2011 | Did not qualify | | | | | | | |
| (Canada) 2015 | Did not qualify | | | | | | | |
| (Peru) 2019 | Did not qualify | | | | | | | |
| (Chile) 2023 | Group Stages | 7th | 3 | 0 | 1 | 2 | 0 | 6 |
| Total | Preliminary round | 4/19 | 11 | 0 | 2 | 9 | 5 | 35 |

== See also ==
- Football in the Dominican Republic
- Dominican Football Federation
- Dominican Republic national under-23 football team
- Dominican Republic national under-20 football team
- Dominican Republic national under-17 football team
- Liga Dominicana de Fútbol
