= Sporting de Alcázar CF =

Spanish football team

Sporting Alcázar
- Full name: Sporting de Alcázar Club de Fútbol
- Founded: 2015
- Ground: Estadio Municipal, Alcázar de San Juan, Castilla–La Mancha, Spain
- Capacity: 5,000
- President: Jesús Villajos
- Head coach: Pablo Fuentes
- League: Primera Autonómica Preferente – Group 1
- 2025–26: Primera Autonómica Preferente – Group 1, 3rd of 18
- Website: sportingdealcazar.com
Home colours	Away colours

Sporting de Alcázar Club de Fútbol is a Spanish football team based in Alcázar de San Juan, Ciudad Real, in the autonomous community of Castilla–La Mancha. Founded in 2015, they play in Primera Autonómica Preferente – Group 1, holding home games at Estadio Municipal de Alcázar, with a capacity of 5,000 seats.

== History ==
Founded in 2015 as a replacement to dissolved CF Gimnástico Alcázar, Sporting began playing in the Segunda Autonómica, and achieved two promotion in their first three seasons. In June 2026, despite missing out a promotion to Tercera Federación, the club qualified to the preliminary rounds of the 2026–27 Copa del Rey, after defeating Manzanares CF in the play-offs.

== Season to season ==
Season	Tier	Division	Place	Copa del Rey
2015–16	7	2ª Aut.	4th	
2016–17	7	2ª Aut.	2nd	
2017–18	6	1ª Aut.	1st	
2018–19	5	Aut. Pref.	12th	
2019–20	5	Aut. Pref.	14th	
2020–21	5	Aut. Pref.	9th	
2021–22	6	Aut. Pref.	10th	
2022–23	6	Aut. Pref.	8th	
2023–24	6	Aut. Pref.	8th	
2024–25	6	Aut. Pref.	4th	
2025–26	6	Aut. Pref.	3rd	
2026–27	6	Aut. Pref.		
