= Álvaro García (footballer, born 1999) =

Spanish footballer

Personal information
- Full name: Álvaro García Arana
- Date of birth: 28 October 1999 (age 26)
- Place of birth: Colindres, Spain
- Height: 1.92 m (6 ft 4 in)
- Position: Forward

Team information
- Current team: Castellón
- Number: 23

Youth career
- 2010–2016: Racing Santander
- 2016–2017: Tropezón
- 2017–2018: Colindres

Senior career*
Years	Team	Apps	(Gls)
2018–2019	Colindres	34	(22)
2019–2021	Laredo	42	(12)
2021–2022	Costa Brava	33	(1)
2022–2023	Laredo	31	(4)
2023–2024	Arenas Getxo	34	(6)
2024–2025	Logroñés	34	(17)
2025–2026	Mérida	19	(12)
2026–	Castellón	22	(2)
- * Club domestic league appearances and goals as of 17 October 2026

Álvaro García Arana (born 28 October 1999), sometimes known as Varo, is a Spanish footballer who plays as a forward for CD Castellón.

== Career ==
Born in Colindres, Cantabria, García began his career with Racing de Santander, and subsequently played for CD Tropezón before finishing his formation with CD Colindres, where he helped the Juvenil squad to achieve a first-ever promotion to the División de Honor in the 2017–18 season by scoring 29 goals. Promoted to the first team in the Regional Preferente shortly after, he scored 22 goals during the campaign.

On 4 July 2019, García moved to Tercera División side CD Laredo, and was mainly a backup option during the campaign as the club achieved promotion to Segunda División B. On 5 July 2021, he joined Primera División RFEF side UE Costa Brava.

On 19 July 2022, after suffering relegation, García returned to Laredo, with the club now in Segunda Federación. On 7 August of the following year, after another relegation, he was announced at Arenas Club de Getxo also in the fourth division.

On 20 June 2024, García agreed to a deal with SD Logroñés still in division four. After scoring 17 goals as the club missed out promotion in the play-offs, he moved to Mérida AD in the third tier on 1 July 2025.

On 18 October 2025, García scored a hat-trick in a 3–1 home win over CD Arenteiro, taking his tally up to six goals in just eight matches. On 23 January of the following year, he moved to Segunda División side CD Castellón on a two-and-a-half-year contract.

García made his professional debut on 25 January 2026, coming on as a late substitute for Diego Barri in a 0–0 away draw against Real Zaragoza.
