= Joaquín Delgado =

Spanish footballer (born 2002)

Personal information
- Full name: Joaquín Delgado Romero
- Date of birth: 15 January 2002 (age 24)
- Place of birth: Utrera, Spain
- Height: 1.87 m (6 ft 2 in)
- Position: Forward

Team information
- Current team: Zaragoza

Youth career
- Utrera
- 2016–2021: Betis

Senior career*
Years	Team	Apps	(Gls)
2021–2023	Córdoba B	57	(17)
2023–2024	Utrera	33	(19)
2024–2026	Oviedo B	50	(37)
2026	→ Barcelona B (loan)	16	(6)
2026	Oviedo	0	(0)
2026–	Zaragoza	0	(0)
- * Club domestic league appearances and goals as of 31 May 2026

Joaquín Delgado Romero (born 15 January 2002) is a Spanish professional footballer who plays as a forward for Real Zaragoza.

== Career ==
Born in Utrera, Seville, Spain, Delgado began his career with hometown side CD Utrera before joining Real Betis' youth sides in 2016. In July 2021, after finishing his formation, he joined Córdoba CF's reserves in Tercera División RFEF.

On 4 August 2023, Delgado returned to his first club Utrera also in the fifth division, and scored 19 goals during the season. On 16 July 2024, he signed a three-year contract with Real Oviedo, being initially assigned to the B-team in the same category.

Delgado was the top scorer of Vetusta's group in the 2024–25 campaign with 23 goals, as the side achieved promotion to Segunda Federación, and scored a further 14 goals in just 17 matches the following season before moving out on loan to FC Barcelona Atlètic on 17 January 2026; his link with the Carbayones was still renewed for two further years prior to the move. Upon returning in July, he was assigned to the first team in Segunda División.

On 20 August 2026, however, Delgado moved to Primera Federación side Real Zaragoza on a three-year deal.
