= Miguel Conde (footballer) =

Spanish footballer (born 2006)

Personal information
- Full name: Miguel Conde Piñeiro
- Date of birth: 25 February 2006 (age 20)
- Place of birth: Puerto del Rosario, Spain
- Height: 1.82 m (6 ft 0 in)
- Position: Forward

Team information
- Current team: Sporting B
- Number: 9

Youth career
- Amanecer
- O Grove
- 2019–2025: Celta

Senior career*
Years	Team	Apps	(Gls)
2024–2025	Celta B	7	(0)
2025–2026	Zaragoza B	16	(0)
2026–	Sporting B	9	(6)
2026–	Sporting Gijón	6	(0)
- * Club domestic league appearances and goals as of 31 May 2026

Miguel Conde Piñeiro (born 25 February 2006) is a Spanish footballer who plays as a forward for Sporting Atlético.

== Career ==
Born in Puerto del Rosario, Fuerteventura, Canary Islands, Conde moved to O Grove, Galicia at the age of four, and began playing with SD Amanecer. He moved to RC Celta de Vigo's youth sides in 2019, from USD O Grove.

Conde made his senior debut with the reserves on 2 March 2024, coming on as a late substitute for Pablo Durán in a 2–0 Primera Federación away win over Unionistas de Salamanca CF. In June 2025, he left the club after finishing his formation, and signed for Real Zaragoza's B-team on 13 July.

On 27 January 2026, Conde terminated his link with the Aragonese side, and moved to another reserve team, Sporting Atlético, just hours later. He made his first team debut with the latter on 1 April, replacing goalscorer Jonathan Dubasin in a 3–1 Segunda División away loss to Racing de Santander.
