= Pablo Agudín =

Spanish footballer (born 2007)

Personal information
- Full name: Pablo Menéndez Agudín
- Date of birth: 8 November 2007 (age 18)
- Place of birth: Avilés, Spain
- Position: Attacking midfielder

Team information
- Current team: Sant Andreu (on loan from Oviedo)

Youth career
- 2011–2016: Quirinal
- 2016–2025: Oviedo

Senior career*
| Years | Team | Apps | (Gls) |
| 2024–2026 | Oviedo B | 23 | (5) |
| 2025– | Oviedo | 7 | (0) |
| 2026– | → Sant Andreu (loan) | 0 | (0) |

International career
| 2022–2023 | Spain U16 | 6 | (1) |
| 2023 | Spain U17 | 3 | (0) |
| 2025– | Spain U19 | 2 | (0) |
- * Club domestic league appearances and goals as of 27 May 2026

Pablo Menéndez Agudín (born 8 November 2007) is a Spanish footballer who plays as an attacking midfielder for UE Sant Andreu, on loan from Real Oviedo.

== Club career ==
Born in Avilés, Asturias, Agudín began his career with CD Quirinal at the age of three, and joined Real Oviedo's youth setup in 2016. On 15 November 2023, while still a youth, he renewed his contract for three more years.

Agudín made his senior debut with the reserves on 3 November 2024, coming on as a second-half substitute in a 3–0 Tercera Federación home win over CD Tuilla. He scored his first senior goals the following 4 May, netting a brace for the B's in a 6–0 away routing of Avilés Stadium CF, and featured in eight matches during the season as the side achieved promotion to Segunda Federación.

Agudín subsequently established himself as a regular starter for the B-team, and made his first team debut on 28 October 2025, starting in a 4–2 away loss to Ourense CF, for the campaign's Copa del Rey. He made his professional – and La Liga – debut six days later, coming on as a late substitute for Federico Viñas in a 0–0 home draw against CA Osasuna; aged 17 years, 11 months and 25 days, he became the fifth-youngest player in Oviedo's history to debut in the top tier.

On 9 August 2026, Agudín was loaned to Primera Federación side UE Sant Andreu, for one year.

== International career ==
Agudín represented Spain at under-16, under-17 and under-19 levels.
