= Alberto Abengózar =

Spanish footballer

Personal information
- Full name: Alberto Abengózar Martínez
- Date of birth: 5 July 1989 (age 37)
- Place of birth: Alcázar de San Juan, Spain
- Height: 1.84 m (6 ft 1/2 in)
- Position: Striker

Youth career
- Gimnástico Alcázar

Senior career*
Years	Team	Apps	(Gls)
2007–2008	Gimnástico Alcázar	30	(12)
2008–2009	Getafe B	9	(1)
2009–2010	Gimnástico Alcázar	17	(13)
2010–2012	Albacete B	31	(20)
2010–2011	Albacete	4	(1)
2012–2013	Villarrobledo	46	(10)
2013–2014	Gimnástico Alcázar	32	(13)
2014–2015	Almansa	14	(5)
2015–2016	La Roda	17	(2)
2016–2017	Ontinyent	28	(7)
2017–2018	Olímpic Xàtiva	19	(1)
2018	Internacional Madrid	3	(0)
- * Club domestic league appearances and goals as of 17 March 2019

Alberto Abengózar Martínez (Spanish pronunciation: [alˈβeɾto aβeŋˈɡoθaɾ maɾˈtineθ]; born 5 July 1989 in Alcázar de San Juan, Province of Ciudad Real, Castilla–La Mancha) is a Spanish footballer who plays as a striker.
