= Luis Carlos (footballer, born 1990) =

Spanish footballer

Personal information
- Full name: Luis Carlos Martín Asensio
- Date of birth: 16 December 1990 (age 35)
- Place of birth: Valladolid, Spain
- Height: 1.70 m (5 ft 7 in)
- Position: Winger

Team information
- Current team: Novelda

Youth career
- 1998–2009: Valladolid

Senior career*
Years	Team	Apps	(Gls)
2009–2010	Valladolid B	0	(0)
2010	→ Tordesillas (loan)	11	(2)
2010–2011	Hércules B		
2011	Hércules	1	(0)
2011–2012	Murcia B	20	(1)
2012–2013	Torrevieja	38	(5)
2013–2014	Jove Español	36	(5)
2014–	Novelda	29	(3)
- * Club domestic league appearances and goals as of 23 March 2015

Luis Carlos Martín Asensio (born 16 December 1990), known as Luis Carlos or Luisito, is a Spanish footballer who plays for Novelda CF as a left winger.

== Club career ==
Born in Valladolid, Castile and León, Luis Carlos joined Real Valladolid's youth setup in 1998, aged eight. He was promoted to the reserves in 2009, but after making no appearances, was loaned to Atlético Tordesillas on 4 January 2010.

In June 2010, Luis Carlos rescinded his link and joined another reserve team, Hércules CF B. On 11 May of the following year he made his first team – and La Liga – debut, coming on as a second-half substitute for Sendoa in a 2–2 home draw against RCD Mallorca.

On 1 July 2011 Luis Carlos signed a two-year deal with Real Murcia, being assigned to the B-team in Tercera División. He subsequently resumed his career in the same division, representing FC Torrevieja, FC Jove Español San Vicente and Novelda CF.
