= Borja Vázquez =

Spanish footballer (born 2005)

Personal information
- Full name: Borja Vázquez Doña
- Date of birth: 18 January 2005 (age 21)
- Place of birth: Jerez de la Frontera, Spain
- Height: 1.86 m (6 ft 1 in)
- Position: Forward

Team information
- Current team: Cádiz
- Number: 20

Youth career
- 2013–2015: Veteranos Xerez
- 2015–2016: Fundación Cádiz
- 2016–2019: Sevilla
- 2019–2022: Balón de Cádiz
- 2023–2024: Cádiz

Senior career*
| Years | Team | Apps | (Gls) |
| 2022–2023 | Balón de Cádiz | 27 | (7) |
| 2024–2025 | Cádiz B | 31 | (3) |
| 2024– | Cádiz | 4 | (0) |
| 2025 | → Sanluqueño (loan) | 14 | (0) |
| 2025–2026 | → Ponferradina (loan) | 37 | (4) |
- * Club domestic league appearances and goals as of 22 August 2026

Borja Vázquez Doña (born 18 January 2005) is a Spanish footballer who plays as a forward for Cádiz CF.

== Career ==
Vázquez was born in Jerez de la Frontera, Cádiz, Andalusia, and began his career with hometown side Veteranos Xerez CD at the age of eight. After representing Cádiz CF's affiliate side CD Fundación Cádiz CF and Sevilla FC, he moved to Balón de Cádiz CF (another affiliate club of Cádiz) in 2019.

Ahead of the 2022–23 season, Vázquez was assigned to the main squad of Balón in Primera Andaluza, and scored his first senior goals on 25 September 2022 by netting a brace in a 2–1 away win over Barbate CF. After scoring seven goals during the campaign for Balón, he was assigned to Cádiz's Juvenil squad in 2023.

On 29 January 2024, Vázquez renewed his contract with the Amarillos until 2026, and was definitely assigned to the reserves in Segunda Federación four days later. He made his first team – and La Liga – debut on 25 May, coming on as a late substitute for Robert Navarro in a 6–1 away loss to UD Almería, as both sides were already relegated.

On 3 February 2025, Vázquez was loaned to Primera Federación side Atlético Sanluqueño CF until June. On 1 August, he renewed his contract until 2028, and was immediately loaned to fellow third division side SD Ponferradina for one year.
