= David del Pozo =

Spanish footballer

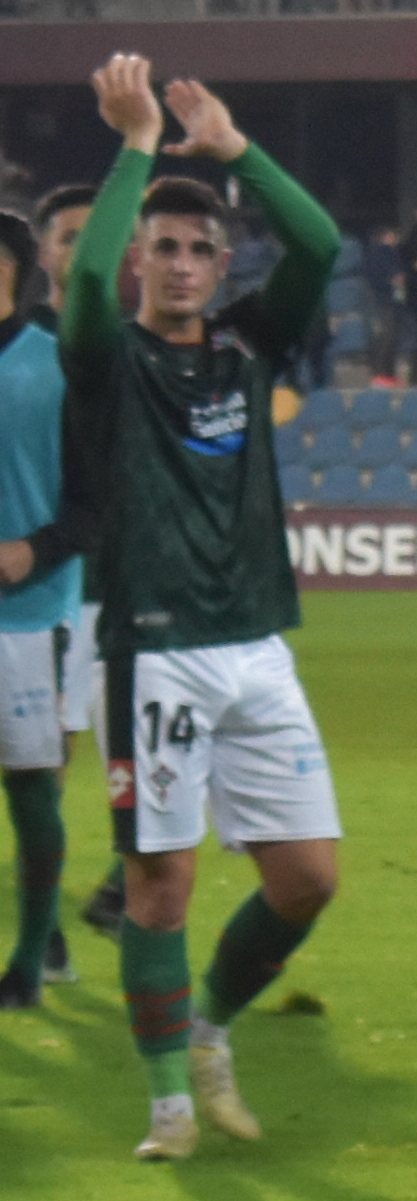
- del Pozo with Racing Ferrol in 2022

Personal information
- Full name: David del Pozo Guillén
- Date of birth: 5 June 1997 (age 29)
- Place of birth: Getafe, Spain
- Height: 1.78 m (5 ft 10 in)
- Position: Midfielder

Team information
- Current team: Ibiza
- Number: 6

Youth career
- 2003–2018: Getafe

Senior career*
Years	Team	Apps	(Gls)
2015–2018	Getafe B	18	(0)
2018–2019	Navalcarnero	31	(0)
2019–2020	Internacional Madrid	26	(0)
2020–2022	Albacete	18	(1)
2021	→ Las Rozas (loan)	16	(0)
2022–2023	Racing Ferrol	44	(0)
2023–2025	Recreativo de Huelva	73	(7)
2025–	Ibiza	28	(1)
- * Club domestic league appearances and goals as of 10 June 2026

David del Pozo Guillén (born 5 June 1997) is a Spanish professional footballer who plays as a central midfielder for Primera Federación club Ibiza.

== Club career ==
Born in Getafe, Community of Madrid, del Pozo joined Getafe CF's youth setup at the age of six. On 1 May 2015, aged 17, he made his senior debut with the reserves at the age of 17 by starting in a 0–1 Segunda División B home loss against SD Amorebieta.

Del Pozo scored his first senior goal on 23 October 2016, netting the game's only in a home success over AD Unión Adarve. He became a regular starter for the B's in the 2017–18 season, scoring seven goals as his side narrowly missed out promotion.

On 2 July 2018, del Pozo signed for CDA Navalcarnero in the third tier. On 10 July of the following year, he moved to fellow league team Internacional de Madrid.

On 5 August 2020, del Pozo agreed to a two-year contract with Albacete Balompié in Segunda División. He made his professional debut on 12 September, coming on as a half-time substitute for Eddy Silvestre in a 0–3 away loss against RCD Espanyol.

On 22 January 2021, after being rarely used, del Pozo was loaned to third division side Las Rozas CF until the end of the season. Back to Alba for the 2021–22 season, he moved to Racing de Ferrol on 1 February 2022.
