= Louis Charles =

Louis Charles may refer to:

- Louis Charles, Duke of Schleswig-Holstein-Sonderburg-Franzhagen (1684–1707)
- Louis Charles, Count of Eu (1700–1775)
- Louis Charles, Count of Beaujolais (1779–1808)
- Prince Louis Charles of Prussia (1773–1796)
- Prince Louis George Charles of Hesse-Darmstadt (1749–1823)
