= Atlético Tordesillas =

Association football club in Spain

- Full name: Club Deportivo Atlético Tordesillas
- Nickname: Tordesillas
- Founded: 1969; 57 years ago
- Stadium: Estadio Las Salinas
- Capacity: 3,500
- President: Óscar Serrano
- Head coach: Jorge Calvo Fernández
- League: Segunda Federación – Group 5
- 2025–26: Tercera Federación – Group 8, 1st of 18 (champions)
- Website: atleticotordesillas.com
Home colours	Away colours

Club Deportivo Atlético Tordesillas is a Spanish football team based in Tordesillas, in the autonomous community of Castile and León. Founded in 1969, it plays in Segunda Federación – Group 5, holding home matches at Las Salinas, with a capacity of 3,500 seats.

== History ==
In the 2016–17 season the club finished 14th in the Tercera División, Group 8.

Already in a partnership agreement with the local professional club Real Valladolid, in August 2020 the two clubs made a formal arrangement for Atlético Tordesillas to function as a subsidiary team (below Real Valladolid Promesas), with the first team players and staff provided and controlled by Valladolid but Tordesillas keeping the identity (badge, kit and stadium), as well as retaining control of the club structure in other areas. This arrangement ended one year later on mutual agreement, after Real Valladolid was relegated to Segunda División.

== Season to season ==
Season	Tier	Division	Place	Copa del Rey
1970–71	6	2ª Reg.	6th	
1971–72	6	2ª Reg.	1st	
1972–73	5	1ª Reg.	8th	
1973–74	5	1ª Reg.	14th	
1974–75	6	2ª Reg.	1st	
1975–76	5	1ª Reg.	6th	
1976–77	5	1ª Reg.	6th	
1977–78	6	1ª Reg.	2nd	
1978–79	6	1ª Reg.	1st	
1979–80	5	Reg. Pref.	16th	
1980–81	5	Reg. Pref.	9th	
1981–82	5	Reg. Pref.	17th	
1982–83	6	1ª Reg.	3rd	
1983–84	5	Reg. Pref.	17th	
1984–85	6	1ª Reg.	9th	
1985–86	6	1ª Reg.	6th	
1986–87	6	1ª Reg.	14th	
1987–88	6	1ª Reg.	4th	
1988–89	6	1ª Reg.	2nd	
1989–90	6	1ª Reg.	2nd	

Season	Tier	Division	Place	Copa del Rey
1990–91	6	1ª Reg.	3rd	
1991–92	6	1ª Reg.	3rd	
1992–93	6	1ª Reg.	4th	
1993–94	5	Reg. Pref.	4th	
1994–95	5	Reg. Pref.	5th	
1995–96	5	Reg. Pref.	10th	
1996–97	5	Reg. Pref.	8th	
1997–98	5	Reg. Pref.	12th	
1998–99	5	Reg. Pref.	11th	
1999–2000	5	1ª Reg.	4th	
2000–01	5	1ª Reg.	1st	
2001–02	4	3ª	10th	
2002–03	4	3ª	5th	
2003–04	4	3ª	9th	
2004–05	4	3ª	15th	
2005–06	4	3ª	18th	
2006–07	5	1ª Reg.	8th	
2007–08	5	1ª Reg.	7th	
2008–09	5	1ª Reg.	1st	
2009–10	4	3ª	14th	

Season	Tier	Division	Place	Copa del Rey
2010–11	4	3ª	16th	
2011–12	4	3ª	15th	
2012–13	5	1ª Reg.	2nd	
2013–14	4	3ª	15th	
2014–15	4	3ª	14th	
2015–16	4	3ª	7th	
2016–17	4	3ª	14th	
2017–18	4	3ª	6th	
2018–19	4	3ª	11th	
2019–20	4	3ª	17th	
2020–21	4	3ª	5th	N/A (Note: Reserve team of Valladolid.)
2021–22	5	3ª RFEF	5th	
2022–23	5	3ª Fed.	5th	
2023–24	5	3ª Fed.	3rd	
2024–25	5	3ª Fed.	2nd	
2025–26	5	3ª Fed.	1st	First round
2026–27	4	2ª Fed.		TBD

- 1 season in Segunda Federación
- 16 seasons in Tercera División
- 5 seasons in Tercera Federación/Tercera División RFEF

== Notable former players ==
- (Spain) Luis Carlos
