= 2020–21 Girona FC season =

Girona
2020–21 season
- President: Delfí Geli
- Head coach: Francisco
- Stadium: Montilivi
- Segunda División: 5th
- Play-offs: Runners-up
- Copa del Rey: Round of 16
- Top goalscorer: League: Cristhian Stuani (10); All: Mamadou Sylla (11)
Home colours	Away colours

The 2020–21 season was the 91st season in the existence of Girona FC and the club's second consecutive season in the second division of Spanish football. In addition to the domestic league, Girona participated in this season's edition of the Copa del Rey. The season covered the period from 24 August 2020 to 30 June 2021.

== Players ==
=== First-team squad ===
Note: Flags indicate national team as defined under FIFA eligibility rules; some limited exceptions apply. Players may hold more than one non-FIFA nationality.

No.	Pos.	Nation	Player
1	GK	ESP	Juan Carlos
2	DF	COL	Bernardo Espinosa
3	DF	ESP	Enric Franquesa (on loan from Villarreal)
7	FW	URU	Cristhian Stuani (vice-captain)
8	MF	URU	Sebastián Cristóforo
9	FW	ARG	Nahuel Bustos (on loan from Manchester City)
10	MF	ESP	Samuel Sáiz
11	DF	ESP	Aday (captain)
13	GK	ESP	Adrián Ortolá
14	MF	ESP	Monchu (on loan from Barcelona)

No.	Pos.	Nation	Player
15	DF	ESP	Juanpe (3rd captain)
16	DF	BRA	Yan Couto (on loan from Manchester City)
17	DF	ESP	Jordi Calavera
18	FW	SEN	Mamadou Sylla
19	FW	ESP	Pablo Moreno (on loan from Manchester City)
20	MF	ESP	Valery Fernández
21	DF	ESP	Antonio Luna
22	DF	URU	Santiago Bueno
23	MF	PAN	Édgar Bárcenas (on loan from Tijuana)
24	MF	ESP	Gerard Gumbau

=== Reserve team ===
Note: Flags indicate national team as defined under FIFA eligibility rules; some limited exceptions apply. Players may hold more than one non-FIFA nationality.

No.	Pos.	Nation	Player
26	MF	MLI	Ibrahima Kebe
27	MF	ESP	Ramon Terrats
28	MF	ESP	Jandro
30	GK	ESP	Jona Morilla
31	DF	ESP	Eric Monjonell
32	FW	ESP	Adrián Turmo

No.	Pos.	Nation	Player
34	DF	ESP	Pau Resta
35	FW	ESP	Pau Víctor
36	FW	ESP	Gonpi
37	FW	ESP	Álex Pachón
38	DF	ESP	Arnau Martínez
39	FW	ESP	Suleiman Camara

=== Out on loan ===
Note: Flags indicate national team as defined under FIFA eligibility rules; some limited exceptions apply. Players may hold more than one non-FIFA nationality.

No.	Pos.	Nation	Player
—	DF	ESP	Iago López (at Logroñés until 30 June 2021)
—	DF	COL	Johan Mojica (at Elche until 30 June 2021)
—	DF	ANG	Jonás Ramalho (at Osasuna until 30 June 2021)
—	DF	URU	Maxi Villa (at Villarreal B until 30 June 2021)
—	MF	ESP	Álex Gallar (at Cartagena until 30 June 2021)

No.	Pos.	Nation	Player
—	MF	ESP	Jairo Izquierdo (at Cádiz until 30 June 2021)
—	MF	BEL	Jonathan Dubasin (at Llagostera until 30 June 2021)
—	MF	CMR	Kévin Soni (at Celta B until 30 June 2021)
—	MF	SEN	Pape Maly Diamanka (at Albacete until 30 June 2021)
—	FW	URU	Joaquín Zeballos (at Barcelona B until 30 June 2021)

== Pre-season and friendlies ==
Win Draw Loss

16 September 2020 Friendly	Barcelona	3–1	Girona	Sant Joan Despí, Spain
19:00 CEST (UTC+2)	Coutinho 21'; Messi 45', 51'		Sáiz 46'	Stadium: Johan Cruyff Stadium; Referee: Albert Catalá Ferrán

== Competitions ==
=== Overview ===
Competition	First match	Last match	Starting round	Final position	Record							
Competition	First match	Last match	Starting round	Final position	Pld	W	D	L	GF	GA	GD	Win %
Segunda División	26 September 2020	30 May 2021	Matchday 1	5th	42	20	11	11	47	36	+11	47.62
Segunda División promotion play-offs	2 June 2021	20 June 2021	Semi-finals	Runners-up	4	2	1	1	5	3	+2	50.00
Copa del Rey	17 December 2020	26 January 2021	First round	Round of 16	4	3	0	1	6	2	+4	75.00
Total					50	25	12	13	58	41	+17	50.00

Source: Soccerway

=== Segunda División ===
==== League table ====
Pos	Team	Pld	W	D	L	GF	GA	GD	Pts	Promotion, qualification or relegation
3	Leganés	42	21	10	11	51	32	+19	73 (Note: Head-to-head points: Leganés: 4, Almería: 1)	Qualification for promotion play-offs
4	Almería	42	21	10	11	61	40	+21	73	Qualification for promotion play-offs
5	Girona	42	20	11	11	47	36	+11	71	Qualification for promotion play-offs
6	Rayo Vallecano (O, P)	42	19	10	13	52	40	+12	67	Qualification for promotion play-offs
7	Sporting Gijón	42	17	14	11	37	28	+9	65	

Source: LaLiga
Rules for classification: 1) points; 2) head-to-head points; 3) head-to-head goal difference; 4) goal difference; 5) number of goals scored
(O) Play-off winners; (P) Promoted

==== Results summary ====
Overall								Home						Away					
Pld	W	D	L	GF	GA	GD	Pts	W	D	L	GF	GA	GD	W	D	L	GF	GA	GD
42	20	11	11	47	36	+11	71	12	4	5	22	12	+10	8	7	6	25	24	+1

Source: La Liga

==== Results by round ====
Round	1	2	3	4	5	6	7	8	9	10	11	12	13	14	15	16	17	18	19	20	21	22	23	24	25	26	27	28	29	30	31	32	33	34	35	36	37	38	39	40	41	42
Ground	A	H	A	H	A	H	A	A	H	A	H	H	A	H	A	H	A	H	A	H	A	H	A	H	A	H	A	H	H	A	H	A	H	A	H	A	H	A	H	A	H	A
Result	D	W	L	L	W	W	L	W	W	D	D	L	W	L	L	W	W	D	L	D	D	W	L	L	D	W	D	L	D	W	W	D	W	L	W	W	W	W	W	W	W	D
Position	9	15	19	20	18	14	18	14	13	11	12	16	12	14	15	14	7	7	8	8	8	8	9	9	9	8	9	9	11	8	8	8	7	7	7	7	6	6	5	5	5	5

Source: La Liga
A = Away; H = Home; W = Win; D = Draw; L = Loss

==== Matches ====
The league fixtures were announced on 31 August 2020.

26 September 2020 3	Sporting Gijón	2–0	Girona	Gijón
18:15 CEST (UTC+2)	Đurđević 49', 59'	Report		Stadium: El Molinón; Attendance: 0 (Note: The match was played behind closed doors due to the COVID-19 pandemic in Spain.); Referee: Alejandro Muñiz Ruiz

4 October 2020 4	Girona	0–1	Fuenlabrada	Girona
12:00 CEST (UTC+2)		Report	Diéguez 45'	Stadium: Montilivi; Attendance: 0 Referee: Oliver De La Fuente Ramos

11 October 2020 5	Leganés	0–1	Girona	Leganés
16:00 CEST (UTC+2)		Report	Sylla 38'	Stadium: Butarque; Attendance: 0 Referee: Alexis Carlos Pulido Santana

18 October 2020 6	Girona	1–0	Oviedo	Girona
20:30 CEST (UTC+2)	Monchu 67'	Report		Stadium: Montilivi; Attendance: 0 Referee: Daniel Jesús Trujillo Suárez

21 October 2020 7	Lugo	3–0	Girona	Lugo
19:00 CEST (UTC+2)		Report		Stadium: Anxo Carro; Attendance: 0 Referee: Iosu Galech Apezteguía

24 October 2020 8	Castellón	0–1	Girona	Castellón de la Plana
20:30 CEST (UTC+2)		Report	Franquesa 42'	Stadium: Nou Estadi Castàlia; Attendance: 0 Referee: Miguel Ángel Ortiz Arias

27 October 2020 9	Girona	2–1	Cartagena	Girona
19:00 CET (UTC+1)	Sylla 7', 66'	Report	Castro 23'	Stadium: Montilivi; Attendance: 0 Referee: Javier Iglesias Villanueva

1 November 2020 10	Almería	0–0	Girona	Almería
21:00 CET (UTC+1)		Report		Stadium: Estadio de los Juegos Mediterráneos; Attendance: 0 Referee: Dámaso Arcediano Monescillo

4 November 2020 1	Zaragoza	2–2	Girona	Zaragoza
19:00 CET (UTC+1)	Narváez 90+2', 90+5'	Report	Sylla 28'; Valery 54'	Stadium: La Romareda; Attendance: 0 Referee: Francisco Hernández Maeso

9 November 2020 11	Girona	1–1	Las Palmas	Girona
21:00 CET (UTC+1)	Espinosa 67'	Report	Ruiz 45'	Stadium: Montilivi; Attendance: 0 Referee: Luis Mario Milla Alvéndiz

14 November 2020 12	Girona	0–1	Mallorca	Girona
18:30 CET (UTC+1)	Aday (yellow card) 34'; Sáiz (yellow card) 54'; Gumbau (yellow card) 76'; Ramalho (red card) 86'; Sylla (yellow card) 90+5' (yellow-red card) 90+5'	Report	Sevilla 5'; Raíllo (yellow card) 61'; De Galarreta (yellow card) 71'; Russo (yellow card) 79'	Stadium: Montilivi; Attendance: 0 Referee: Jon Ander González Esteban

20 November 2020 13	Espanyol	1–2	Girona	Cornellà de Llobregat
21:00 CET (UTC+1)	De Tomás 40'; Da. López (yellow card) 56'; Mérida (yellow card) 70'; Embarba (yellow card) 75'; Puado (yellow card) 85'	Report	Cristóforo (yellow card) 66'; Sáiz (yellow card) 69', (goal) 88' (pen.); Bárcenas 83'	Stadium: RCDE Stadium; Attendance: 0 Referee: José Antonio López Toca

24 November 2020 14	Girona	0–1	Málaga	Girona
19:00 CET (UTC+1)		Report	Escassi 33'	Stadium: Montilivi; Attendance: 0 Referee: Miguel Ángel Ortiz Arias

27 November 2020 15	Alcorcón	1–0	Girona	Alcorcón
19:00 CET (UTC+1)		Report		Stadium: Santo Domingo; Attendance: 0 Referee: Iñaki Bikandi Garrido

1 December 2020 16	Girona	1–0	Mirandés	Girona
21:30 CET (UTC+1)		Report		Stadium: Montilivi; Attendance: 0 Referee: Francisco Hernández Maeso

6 December 2020 17	Albacete	0–2	Girona	Albacete
18:15 CET (UTC+1)		Report		Stadium: Carlos Belmonte; Attendance: 0 Referee: David Gálvez Rascón

10 December 2020 2	Girona	2–0	UD Logroñés	Girona
19:00 CET (UTC+1)		Report		Stadium: Montilivi; Attendance: 0 Referee: Dámaso Arcediano Monescillo

14 December 2020 18	Girona	0–0	Rayo Vallecano	Girona
19:00 CET (UTC+1)		Report		Stadium: Montilivi; Attendance: 0 Referee: Alejandro Muñiz Ruiz

21 December 2020 19	Tenerife	2–0	Girona	Santa Cruz de Tenerife
21:30 CET (UTC+1)		Report		Stadium: Heliodoro Rodríguez López; Attendance: 0 Referee: José Antonio López Toca

4 January 2021 20	Girona	0–0	Sabadell	Girona
18:30 CET (UTC+1)		Report		Stadium: Montilivi; Attendance: 0 Referee: Gorka Sagués Oscoz

11 January 2021 21	Ponferradina	1–1	Girona	Ponferrada
19:00 CET (UTC+1)		Report		Stadium: Estadio El Toralín; Attendance: 0 Referee: Saúl Ais Reig

23 January 2021 22	Girona	1–0	Espanyol	Girona
18:15 CET (UTC+1)	Moreno 41'; Franquesa (yellow card) 45'; Bueno (yellow card) 71'	Report	Embarba (yellow card) 74'; Da. López (yellow card) 75'	Stadium: Montilivi; Attendance: 0 Referee: Juan Luis Pulido Santana

30 January 2021 23	Mallorca	1–0	Girona	Palma
20:30 CET (UTC+1)	Sánchez (yellow card) 25'; Oliván (yellow card) 52'; Valjent (yellow card) 75'; Amath 90+2'	Report	Monchu (yellow card) 82'	Stadium: Visit Mallorca Stadium; Attendance: 0 Referee: Alejandro Muñíz Ruiz

7 February 2021 24	Girona	0–2	Leganés	Girona
14:00 CET (UTC+1)		Report	Bua 75', 90+2'	Stadium: Montilivi; Attendance: 0 Referee: Eduardo Prieto Iglesias

13 February 2021 25	Mirandés	3–3	Girona	Miranda de Ebro
18:15 CET (UTC+1)		Report		Stadium: Estadio Municipal de Anduva; Attendance: 0 Referee: Luis Mario Milla Alvendiz

21 February 2021 26	Girona	2–1	Castellón	Girona
18:15 CET (UTC+1)		Report		Stadium: Montilivi; Attendance: 0 Referee: Daniel Jesús Trujillo Suárez

28 February 2021 27	Fuenlabrada	1–1	Girona	Fuenlabrada
14:00 CET (UTC+1)	Nteka 70'	Report	Stuani 9' (pen.)	Stadium: Fernando Torres; Attendance: 0 Referee: José Antonio López Toca

7 March 2021 28	Girona	0–1	Almería	Girona
21:00 CET (UTC+1)	Terrats (yellow card) 49'; Espinosa (red card) 90+4'	Report	Costa (yellow card) 27'; Morlanes (yellow card) 50'; Sadiq 72'; Villar (yellow card) 90+4'; Maraš (yellow card) 90+7'	Stadium: Montilivi; Attendance: 0 Referee: Javier Iglesias Villanueva

13 March 2021 29	Girona	1–1	Lugo	Girona
18:15 CET (UTC+1)		Report		Stadium: Montilivi; Attendance: 0 Referee: Aitor Gorostegui Fernández-Ortega

19 March 2021 30	Las Palmas	1–2	Girona	Las Palmas
21:00 CET (UTC+1)		Report		Stadium: Estadio Gran Canaria; Attendance: 0 Referee: Álvaro Moreno Aragón

28 March 2021 31	Girona	2–1	Albacete	Girona
16:00 CEST (UTC+2)	Couto (yellow card) 13'; Gumbau (yellow card) 52'; Terrats (yellow card) 57'; Sylla 90+2'; Juanpe (yellow card) 90+4'; Stuani 90+5'	Report	Ortuño 68'; Benito (yellow card) 81'	Stadium: Montilivi; Attendance: 0 Referee: David Gálvez Rascón

31 March 2021 32	Sabadell	2–2	Girona	Sabadell
19:00 CEST (UTC+2)	Stoichkov 8', 45+2'	Report	Gumbau 44'; Sáiz 55' (pen.)	Stadium: Estadi de la Nova Creu Alta; Attendance: 0 Referee: Francisco José Hernández Maeso

3 April 2021 33	Girona	3–1	Ponferradina	Girona
16:00 CEST (UTC+2)	Stuani 45+1'; Sáiz 51'; Bustos 84'	Report	Yuri 90+1'	Stadium: Montilivi; Attendance: 0 Referee: Dámaso Arcediano Monescillo

10 April 2021 34	Rayo Vallecano	2–1	Girona	Madrid
18:15 CEST (UTC+2)	Comesaña (yellow card) 16', (goal) 38'; Trejo (yellow card) 24'; Saveljich (yellow card) 35'; Isi 75'; Advíncula (yellow card) 78'	Report	Bueno 36'; Couto (yellow card) 48'; Stuani (yellow card) 54'	Stadium: Vallecas; Attendance: 0 Referee: Juan Luis Pulido Santana

16 April 2021 35	Girona	3–0	Zaragoza	Girona
21:00 CEST (UTC+2)	Stuani 6' (pen.); Aday (yellow card) 53'; Bueno (yellow card) 57'; Bustos 65'; Gumbau (yellow card) 67'; Luna (yellow card) 78'; Sylla 84'	Report	Fernández (yellow card) 18'; Tejero (yellow card) 60'	Stadium: Montilivi; Attendance: 0 Referee: José Antonio López Toca

25 April 2021 36	Oviedo	0–1	Girona	Oviedo
14:00 CEST (UTC+2)		Report	Bárcenas 63'	Stadium: Carlos Tartiere; Attendance: 0 Referee: Gorka Sagués Oscoz

1 May 2021 37	Girona	1–0	Tenerife	Girona
16:00 CEST (UTC+2)	Franquesa 33'	Report		Stadium: Montilivi; Attendance: 0 Referee: Rubén Ávalos Barrera

9 May 2021 38	UD Logroñés	1–4	Girona	Logroño
18:15 CEST (UTC+2)	Petcoff (yellow card) 13'; Paulino (yellow card) 22'; Bobadilla (yellow card) 56'; López (yellow card) 83'; Vitoria (yellow card) 88'; R. Martínez 90+1'	Report	A. Martínez 14'; Stuani 40', 57' (pen.); Juanpe 85'; Bustos (yellow card) 90'	Stadium: Las Gaunas; Attendance: 0 Referee: Rafael Sánchez López

17 May 2021 39	Girona	1–0	Sporting Gijón	Girona
21:00 CEST (UTC+2)	Juanpe 43'	Report	Gragera (yellow card) 28'; Fuego (yellow card) 37'; Mariño (yellow card) 45'	Stadium: Montilivi; Attendance: 0 Referee: Alejandro Muñiz Ruiz

20 May 2021 40	Málaga	0–1	Girona	Málaga
19:00 CEST (UTC+2)	Mejías (red card) 16'; Escassi (yellow card) 16'; Jairo (yellow card) 29'; Joaquín (yellow card) 40'; Matos (yellow card) 66'; Rodríguez (yellow card) 90+3'	Report	Gumbau (yellow card) 19'; Monchu (yellow card) 33'; Bueno 62', (yellow card) 86'	Stadium: La Rosaleda; Attendance: 0 Referee: Álvaro Moreno Aragón

24 May 2021 41	Girona	1–0	Alcorcón	Girona
21:00 CEST (UTC+2)	Sáiz (yellow card) 76'; Moreno (yellow card) 83'; Monchu 87'	Report	Gual (yellow card) 45+1'; Bravo (yellow card) 90+2'	Stadium: Montilivi; Attendance: 0 Referee: Gorka Sagués Oscoz

30 May 2021 42	Cartagena	1–1	Girona	Cartagena
21:00 CEST (UTC+2)	Carrasquilla (yellow card) 3'; De Blasis 60'; Antoñito (yellow card) 80'; José Ángel (yellow card) 82'	Report	Bueno (yellow card) 20'; Aday (yellow card) 36'; Valery 79'	Stadium: Cartagonova; Attendance: 0 Referee: Daniel Jesús Trujillo Suárez

==== Promotion play-offs ====
2 June 2021 SF First leg	Girona	3–0	Almería	Girona
21:00 CEST (UTC+2)	Bárcenas 3'; Couto 5'; Juanpe (yellow card) 52'; Franquesa (yellow card) 54'; Sylla 65'	Report	Balliu (yellow card) 27'; Ramazani (yellow card) 30'; Makaridze (yellow card) 85'	Stadium: Montilivi; Attendance: 0 Referee: Alejandro Muñiz Ruiz

5 June 2021 SF Second leg	Almería	0–0 (0–3 agg.)	Girona	Almería
21:00 CEST (UTC+2)	Fernandes (yellow card) 39'; Buñuel (yellow card) 43'; Robertone (yellow card) 52'; Costa (yellow card) 56'	Report	Kebe (yellow card) 67'; Sylla (yellow card) 89'	Stadium: Estadio de los Juegos Mediterráneos; Attendance: 0 Referee: Miguel Ángel Ortiz Arias

13 June 2021 Final First leg	Rayo Vallecano	1–2	Girona	Madrid
21:00 CEST (UTC+2)	Isi 6'; Trejo (yellow card) 52'; Bebé (yellow card) 90+8'	Report	Franquesa 41'; Sáiz (yellow card) 45+3'; Sylla 46'; Cristóforo (yellow card) 60'; Juan Carlos (yellow card) 69'; Martínez (yellow card) 77'	Stadium: Vallecas; Attendance: 0 Referee: Juan Luis Pulido Santana

20 June 2021 Final Second leg	Girona	0–2 (2–3 agg.)	Rayo Vallecano	Girona
21:00 CEST (UTC+2)	Bárcenas (yellow card) 31'; Juanpe (yellow card) 85'	Report	Á. García 7'; Velázquez (yellow card) 40' (yellow-red card) 56'; Trejo 45+2', (yellow card) 76'; Catena (yellow card) 90+6'	Stadium: Montilivi; Attendance: 0 Referee: Javier Iglesias Villanueva

=== Copa del Rey ===
17 December 2020 First round	Gimnástica Segoviana	0–2	Girona	Segovia
19:00 CET (UTC+1)		Report	Bustos 39', 77'	Stadium: La Albuera; Referee: Álvaro Moreno Aragón

7 January 2021 Second round	Girona	2–1 (a.e.t.)	Lugo	Girona
21:00 CET (UTC+1)	Franquesa (yellow card) 53'; Marcelo 115' (o.g.); Bueno 120+3'	Report	Escobar (yellow card) 37'; Valentín (yellow card) 52'; Ramos 103'; Seoane (yellow card) 105'; Torres (yellow card) 106'	Stadium: Montilivi; Referee: Eduardo Prieto Iglesias

16 January 2021 Round of 32	Girona	2–0	Cádiz	Girona
16:00 CET (UTC+1)	Valery 48', 58'; Kebe (yellow card) 82'; Stuani (yellow card) 84'	Report	Erimuya (yellow card) 26'	Stadium: Montilivi; Referee: Valentín Pizarro Gómez

26 January 2021 Round of 16	Girona	0–1	Villarreal	Girona
21:00 CET (UTC+1)	Bustos (yellow card) 39'; Franquesa (yellow card) 90+2'	Report	Trigueros (yellow card) 17'; Pino 19'; Coquelin (yellow card) 51'; Baena (yellow card) 73'; Raba (yellow card) 90+1'	Stadium: Montilivi; Referee: Ricardo de Burgos Bengoetxea
