= Jandro =

Jandro is a short form of the Spanish given name Alejandro. It may refer to:

- Jandro (footballer, born 1979), Spanish football attacking midfielder
- Jandro (footballer, born 2001), Spanish football midfielder
- Jandro Orellana (born 2000), Spanish football midfielder
