= Selvi Clua =

Spanish footballer

Personal information
- Full name: Selvi Clua Oya
- Date of birth: 29 January 2005 (age 21)
- Place of birth: El Pinell de Brai, Spain
- Height: 1.89 m (6 ft 2 in)
- Position: Midfielder

Team information
- Current team: Casa Pia (on loan from Almería)

Youth career
- Reus
- 2020–2021: Gimnàstic
- 2021–2023: Girona

Senior career*
Years	Team	Apps	(Gls)
2022–2025	Girona B	39	(2)
2023–2025	Girona	5	(0)
2025–	Almería	19	(0)
2026	→ Mirandés (loan)	13	(0)
2026–	→ Casa Pia (loan)	0	(0)
- * Club domestic league appearances and goals as of 9 June 2026

Selvi Clua Oya (born 29 January 2005), sometimes known as just Selvi, is a Spanish professional footballer who plays as a midfielder for Portuguese club Casa Pia AC, on loan from UD Almería.

== Career ==
=== Girona ===
Born in El Pinell de Brai, Tarragona, Catalonia, Selvi joined Girona FC's youth setup in 2021, after representing Gimnàstic de Tarragona and CF Reus Deportiu. He made his senior debut with the reserves on 11 December 2022, starting in a 4–1 Tercera Federación home routing of CE L'Hospitalet.

Called up to the first team for the 2023 pre-season, Selvi made his first team – and La Liga – debut on 20 August 2023, coming on as a late substitute for Yangel Herrera in a 3–0 home win over Getafe CF.

=== Almería ===
On 31 January 2025, Selvi joined Segunda División side UD Almería on a five-and-a-half-year contract. On 7 January of the following year, he moved to fellow league team CD Mirandés on loan until June.

On 25 July 2026, Selvi moved abroad for the first time in his career, joining Primeira Liga side Casa Pia AC on a one-year loan, with a buyout clause.

== Personal life ==
Selvi's father, also named Selvi, was also a footballer. A defender, he spent the most of his career with Nàstic.

== Career statistics ==
As of 2 February 2025

Appearances and goals by club, season and competition
Club	Season	League			National cup		Continental		Other		Total	
Club	Season	Division	Apps	Goals	Apps	Goals	Apps	Goals	Apps	Goals	Apps	Goals
Girona B	2022–23	Tercera Federación	13	0	—		—		—		13	0
Girona B	2023–24	Tercera Federación	17	1	—		—		—		17	1
Girona B	2024–25	Tercera Federación	9	1	—		—		—		9	1
Girona B	Total		39	2	—		—		—		39	2
Girona	2023–24	La Liga	1	0	1	0	—		—		2	0
Girona	2024–25	La Liga	4	0	2	0	1 (Note: Appearances in UEFA Champions League)	0	—		7	0
Girona	Total		5	0	3	0	1	0	—		9	0
Almería	2024–25	Segunda División	0	0	—		—		—		0	0
Career total			44	2	3	0	1	0	0	0	48	2
