= Miguel Gutiérrez (footballer, born 2001) =

Spanish footballer

Personal information
- Full name: Miguel Gutiérrez Ortega
- Date of birth: 27 July 2001 (age 25)
- Place of birth: Pinto, Spain
- Height: 1.81 m (5 ft 11 in)
- Positions: Left-back; left wing-back

Team information
- Current team: Bayer Leverkusen
- Number: 3

Youth career
- 2006–2011: Getafe
- 2011–2020: Real Madrid

Senior career*
| Years | Team | Apps | (Gls) |
| 2020–2022 | Real Madrid B | 31 | (3) |
| 2021–2022 | Real Madrid | 9 | (0) |
| 2022–2025 | Girona | 98 | (5) |
| 2025–2026 | Napoli | 28 | (1) |
| 2026– | Bayer Leverkusen | 8 | (1) |

International career^{‡}
| 2017–2018 | Spain U17 | 11 | (2) |
| 2018–2019 | Spain U18 | 5 | (1) |
| 2018–2019 | Spain U19 | 11 | (1) |
| 2021–2023 | Spain U21 | 2 | (0) |
| 2024 | Spain U23 | 5 | (1) |
Medal record
Men's football
Representing Spain
Olympic Games
| Gold medal – first place | 2024 Paris |
UEFA European Under-19 Championship
| Winner | 2019 Armenia |
- * Club domestic league appearances and goals as of 17:30, 31 October 2026 (UTC) ‡ National team caps and goals as of 9 August 2024

Miguel Gutiérrez Ortega (born 27 July 2001) is a Spanish professional footballer who plays as a left-back or left wing-back for Bundesliga club Bayer Leverkusen.

== Club career ==
=== Real Madrid ===
A native of Pinto, Spain, Gutiérrez started out at the academy of Getafe before joining Real Madrid in 2011. In July 2017 the then Manchester United coach José Mourinho was interested in the signing of the young Spaniard, but the 16-year-old eventually decided to stay at Real Madrid.

During the summer of 2019, Gutiérrez was propelled into the first team by coach Zinedine Zidane to participate in the Audi Cup, following the injury of newcomer Ferland Mendy. He then was the first player from a Real Madrid training center born in 2001 to join the first team.

He made his professional debut for Real Madrid on 21 April 2021, coming on as a substitute in a 3–0 win over Cádiz. His first start came on 15 May 2021, in a 4–1 victory at Granada.

=== Girona ===
On 5 August 2022, Gutiérrez signed for Girona on a contract until 30 June 2027, with Real Madrid retaining 50% of his rights and a sell-on clause. He made his debut for the club on the first matchday of the 2022–23 season, replacing Valery in the 61st minute of a 1–0 away loss to Valencia. On 4 March 2023, Gutiérrez scored his first goal for Girona in a 3–2 league loss to his former club Getafe. On 11 December 2023, Gutiérrez scored against Barcelona in a 4–2 away victory, Girona's first ever victory against Barcelona.

=== Napoli ===
On 19 August 2025, Gutiérrez joined Serie A club Napoli, signing a five-year contract for a reported fee of €20,000,000.

== International career ==
Gutiérrez represented Spain at the under-19 level for the 2019 UEFA European Under-19 Championship in Armenia, in which Spain became the winners.

In 2024, Gutiérrez was included in the Spain U23 squad for the 2024 Summer Olympics. He scored a goal in the Group C match against the Dominican Republic, and later won the gold medal.

== Career statistics ==
As of match played 31 October 2026

Appearances and goals by club, season and competition
| Club | Season | League | | | National cup (Note: Includes Copa del Rey, Coppa Italia, DFB-Pokal) | | Continental | | Other | | Total | |
| Club | Season | Division | Apps | Goals | Apps | Goals | Apps | Goals | Apps | Goals | Apps | Goals |
|---|---|---|---|---|---|---|---|---|---|---|---|---|
| Real Madrid Castilla | 2020–21 | Segunda División B | 15 | 1 | — | | — | | 0 | 0 | 15 | 1 |
| Real Madrid Castilla | 2021–22 | Primera Federación | 16 | 2 | — | | — | | — | | 16 | 2 |
| Real Madrid Castilla | Total | | 31 | 3 | — | | — | | 0 | 0 | 31 | 3 |
| Real Madrid | 2020–21 | La Liga | 6 | 0 | 0 | 0 | 0 | 0 | 0 | 0 | 6 | 0 |
| Real Madrid | 2021–22 | La Liga | 3 | 0 | 0 | 0 | 1 (Note: Appearance(s) in UEFA Champions League) | 0 | 0 | 0 | 4 | 0 |
| Real Madrid | Total | | 9 | 0 | 0 | 0 | 1 | 0 | 0 | 0 | 10 | 0 |
| Girona | 2022–23 | La Liga | 34 | 2 | 2 | 0 | — | | — | | 36 | 2 |
| Girona | 2023–24 | La Liga | 35 | 2 | 5 | 0 | — | | — | | 40 | 2 |
| Girona | 2024–25 | La Liga | 29 | 1 | 1 | 0 | 6 | 1 | — | | 36 | 2 |
| Girona | Total | | 98 | 5 | 8 | 0 | 6 | 1 | — | | 112 | 6 |
| Napoli | 2025–26 | Serie A | 28 | 1 | 1 | 0 | 5 | 0 | 2 (Note: Appearances in Supercoppa Italiana) | 0 | 36 | 1 |
| Bayer Leverkusen | 2026–27 | Bundesliga | 8 | 1 | 2 | 0 | 2 (Note: Appearance(s) in UEFA Europa League) | 0 | — | | 12 | 1 |
| Career total | | | 174 | 10 | 11 | 0 | 14 | 1 | 2 | 0 | 201 | 11 |

== Honours ==
Real Madrid Juvenil A

- UEFA Youth League: 2019–20

Real Madrid

- La Liga: 2021–22
- UEFA Champions League: 2021–22

Napoli

- Supercoppa Italiana: 2025–26

Spain U19

- UEFA European Under-19 Championship: 2019

Spain U23

- Summer Olympics gold medal: 2024

Individual

- La Liga U23 Player of the Month: April 2024
- La Liga Team of the Season: 2023–24
