= 2023–24 Girona FC season =

Girona FC
2023–24 season
- President: Delfí Geli
- Head coach: Míchel
- Stadium: Estadi Montilivi
- La Liga: 3rd
- Copa del Rey: Quarter-finals
- Top goalscorer: League: Artem Dovbyk (24); All: Artem Dovbyk (24)
- Biggest win: Girona 7–0 Granada
- Biggest defeat: Real Madrid 4–0 Girona
Home colours	Away colours	Third colours

The 2023–24 season was Girona Futbol Club's 94th season in existence and second consecutive season in La Liga. They also competed in the Copa del Rey, finishing the campaign in the quarter-finals.

Following a 4–2 victory over Barcelona on the 34th matchday, Girona made history by qualifying for the UEFA Champions League for the first time ever.

== Players ==
=== First-team squad ===
As of 20 January 2024

Note: Flags indicate national team as defined under FIFA eligibility rules; some limited exceptions apply. Players may hold more than one non-FIFA nationality.

No.	Pos.	Nation	Player
1	GK	ESP	Juan Carlos
3	DF	ESP	Miguel Gutiérrez
4	DF	ESP	Arnau Martínez
5	DF	ESP	David López
7	FW	URU	Cristhian Stuani (captain)
8	FW	UKR	Viktor Tsyhankov
9	FW	UKR	Artem Dovbyk
10	MF	ESP	Borja García
11	DF	ESP	Valery Fernández
13	GK	ARG	Paulo Gazzaniga
14	MF	ESP	Aleix García
15	DF	ESP	Juanpe

No.	Pos.	Nation	Player
16	MF	BRA	Sávio (on loan from Troyes)
17	DF	NED	Daley Blind
18	MF	ESP	Pablo Torre (on loan from Barcelona)
19	MF	ESP	Toni Villa
20	DF	BRA	Yan Couto (on loan from Manchester City)
21	MF	VEN	Yangel Herrera
22	MF	COL	Jhon Solís
23	MF	ESP	Iván Martín
24	FW	ESP	Portu
25	DF	ESP	Eric García (on loan from Barcelona)
26	GK	ESP	Toni Fuidias

=== Reserve team ===
Note: Flags indicate national team as defined under FIFA eligibility rules; some limited exceptions apply. Players may hold more than one non-FIFA nationality.

No.	Pos.	Nation	Player
28	MF	ESP	Silvi Clua
29	FW	ESP	Alex Almansa
30	FW	ESP	Iker Almena
31	FW	POR	Jastin García
32	MF	ESP	Enric García

No.	Pos.	Nation	Player
34	FW	VEN	Juan Arango
35	DF	HUN	Antal Yaakobishvili
36	MF	ESP	Ricard Artero
40	FW	ESP	Carles Garrido (on loan from Cornellà)

=== Out on loan ===
Note: Flags indicate national team as defined under FIFA eligibility rules; some limited exceptions apply. Players may hold more than one non-FIFA nationality.

No.	Pos.	Nation	Player
—	DF	PER	Alexander Callens (at AEK Athens until 30 June 2024)
—	MF	ESP	Álex Sala (at Córdoba until 30 June 2024)
—	MF	MLI	Ibrahima Kébé (at Mirandés until 30 June 2024)
—	FW	ESP	Pau Víctor (at Barcelona Atlètic until 30 June 2024)
—	FW	MAR	Ilyas Chaira (at Mirandés until 30 June 2024)

No.	Pos.	Nation	Player
—	FW	ESP	Gabri Martínez (at Mirandés until 30 June 2024)
—	FW	ESP	Arnau Ortiz (at Cartagena until 30 June 2024)
—	FW	DOM	Óscar Ureña (at Leganés until 30 June 2024)
—	FW	ESP	Manu Vallejo (at Zaragoza until 30 June 2024)

== Transfers ==
=== In ===
Pos.	Player	Transferred from	Fee	Date	Source
GK	(Argentina) Paulo Gazzaniga	(England) Fulham	€3,000,000	6 June 2023	
DF	(Netherlands) Daley Blind	(Germany) Bayern Munich	Free	7 July 2023	
FW	(Brazil) Savinho	(France) Troyes	Loan	13 July 2023	
MF	(Venezuela) Yangel Herrera	(England) Manchester City	Undisclosed	14 July 2023	
DF	(Brazil) Yan Couto	(England) Manchester City	Loan	14 July 2023	
MF	(Spain) Pablo Torre	(Spain) Barcelona	Loan	18 July 2023	
MF	(Spain) Iván Martín	(Spain) Villarreal	€2,000,000	22 July 2023	
FW	(Ukraine) Artem Dovbyk	(Ukraine) Dnipro-1	€7,000,000	6 August 2023	
DF	(Spain) Eric García	(Spain) Barcelona	Loan	1 September 2023	
MF	(Colombia) Jhon Solís	(Colombia) Atlético Nacional	€6,000,000	1 September 2023	
MF	(Spain) Portu	(Spain) Getafe	€3,500,000	1 September 2023	

=== Out ===
Pos.	Player	Transferred to	Fee	Date	Source
MF	(Brazil) Reinier	(Spain) Real Madrid	Loan return	9 June 2023	
FW	(Argentina) Taty Castellanos	(United States) New York City FC	Loan return	9 June 2023	
MF	(Spain) Rodrigo Riquelme	(Spain) Atlético Madrid	Loan return	9 June 2023	
DF	(Spain) Javi Hernández	(Spain) Leganés	Loan return	9 June 2023	
MF	(Spain) Ramon Terrats	(Spain) Villarreal	€2,500,000	30 June 2023	
MF	(Spain) Álex Sala	(Spain) Córdoba	Loan	11 July 2023	
MF	(Spain) Oriol Romeu	(Spain) Barcelona	€5,000,000	19 July 2023	
FW	(Spain) Manu Vallejo	(Spain) Zaragoza	Loan	23 August 2023	
DF	(Uruguay) Santiago Bueno	(England) Wolverhampton Wanderers	€12,000,000	31 August 2023	
DF	(Peru) Alexander Callens	(Greece) AEK Athens	Loan	8 September 2023	
DF	(Colombia) Bernardo Espinosa	(Colombia) Atlético Nacional	Free	1 January 2024	
DF	(Mali) Ibrahima Kébé	(Spain) Mirandés	Loan	20 January 2024	

== Pre-season and friendlies ==
Win Draw Loss Fixtures

19 July 2023 Friendly	Olot	2–4	Girona	Olot
19:30 CEST (UTC+2)	Orriols 4'; Forés 27'	Report	Kim Min-su 19'; Almena 54'; Vallejo 58'; Víctor 90+2'	Stadium: Camp Municipal d'Olot; Attendance: 3,013; Referee: Albert Avalos

22 July 2023 Friendly	Girona	2–2	Andorra	Les Preses
11:00 CEST (UTC+2)	Herrera 45'; Stuani 54' (pen.)	Report	Nieto 7', 21'	Stadium: Instalaciones de Royalverd; Referee: Brull Acerete

26 July 2023 Friendly	Sheffield United	0–2	Girona	Manchester, England
13:00 BST (UTC+1)		Report	Sávio 74'; Torre 90+3'	Stadium: Academy Stadium; Attendance: 0 Referee: Tom Nield

29 July 2023 Friendly	Blackburn Rovers	2–3	Girona	Blackburn, England
15:00 BST (UTC+1)	Leonard 38'; Markanday 67'	Report	Stuani 24'; Tsyhankov 28'; Blind 49'	Stadium: Ewood Park; Referee: Thomas Bramall

2 August 2023 Friendly	Napoli	1–1 (3–1 p)	Girona	Castel di Sangro, Italy
18:30 CEST (UTC+2)	Simeone 42' (pen.)	Report	Stuani 13'; A. García (yellow card) 31'; Martínez (yellow card) 72'	Stadium: Stadio Teofilo Patini; Attendance: 7,200; Referee: Giacomo Camplone (Italy)
	Penalties
	Raspadori (penalty scored); Zambo Anguissa (penalty scored); Zieliński (penalty scored); Politano (penalty missed)		(penalty missed) Víctor; (penalty missed) Callens; (penalty scored) Almena; (penalty missed) Couto

6 August 2023 Costa Brava Trophy	Girona	2–1	Lazio	Girona
20:00 CEST (UTC+2)	Herrera (yellow card) 45+1'; Tsyhankov 50'; Stuani 70', (yellow card) 77'; Gazzaniga (yellow card) 77'	Report	Zaccagni (yellow card) 28'; Castellanos 76'; Luis Alberto (yellow card) 59'; Cancellieri (yellow card) 77'; Marušić (yellow card) 77'	Stadium: Montilivi; Attendance: 8,295; Referee: Víctor García Verdura (Spain)

== Competitions ==
=== Overall record ===
Competition	First match	Last match	Starting round	Final position	Record							
Competition	First match	Last match	Starting round	Final position	Pld	W	D	L	GF	GA	GD	Win %
La Liga	12 August 2023	24 May 2024	Matchday 1	3rd	38	25	6	7	85	46	+39	65.79
Copa del Rey	1 November 2023	24 January 2024	First round	Quarter-finals	5	4	0	1	14	7	+7	80.00
Total					43	29	6	8	99	53	+46	67.44

Source: Soccerway

=== La Liga ===
==== League table ====
Pos	Team	Pld	W	D	L	GF	GA	GD	Pts	Qualification or relegation
1	Real Madrid (C)	38	29	8	1	87	26	+61	95	Qualification for the Champions League league phase
2	Barcelona	38	26	7	5	79	44	+35	85	Qualification for the Champions League league phase
3	Girona	38	25	6	7	85	46	+39	81	Qualification for the Champions League league phase
4	Atlético Madrid	38	24	4	10	70	43	+27	76	Qualification for the Champions League league phase
5	Athletic Bilbao	38	19	11	8	61	37	+24	68	Qualification for the Europa League league phase (Note: Since the winners of the 2023–24 Copa del Rey, Athletic Bilbao, qualified for European competition based on league position, the Europa League berth awarded to the Copa del Rey winners was passed to the sixth-placed team, and the Conference League berth awarded to the sixth-placed team was passed to the seventh-placed team.)

Source: LaLiga EA Sports
Rules for classification: 1) Points; 2) Head-to-head points; 3) Head-to-head goal difference; 4) Goal difference; 5) Goals scored; 6) Fair-play points
(Note: Head-to-head record is used only after all the matches between the teams in question have been played)
(C) Champions

==== Results summary ====
Overall								Home						Away					
Pld	W	D	L	GF	GA	GD	Pts	W	D	L	GF	GA	GD	W	D	L	GF	GA	GD
38	25	6	7	85	46	+39	81	15	2	2	53	20	+33	10	4	5	32	26	+6

Source: La Liga

==== Results by round ====
Round	1	2	3	4	5	6	7	8	9	10	11	12	13	14	15	16	17	18	19	20	21	22	23	24	25	26	27	28	29	30	31	32	33	34	35	36	37	38
Ground	A	H	A	H	A	H	A	H	A	H	H	A	A	H	H	A	H	A	H	A	H	A	H	A	A	H	A	H	A	H	A	H	A	H	A	H	A	H
Result	D	W	W	W	W	W	W	L	W	W	W	W	W	D	W	W	W	D	W	D	W	W	D	L	L	W	L	W	L	W	L	W	W	W	D	L	W	W
Position	10	4	3	2	3	2	1	3	2	2	2	1	1	2	2	1	1	2	2	1	1	1	2	2	2	2	2	2	3	3	3	3	3	3	3	3	3	3
Points	1	4	7	10	13	16	19	19	22	25	28	31	34	35	38	41	44	45	48	49	52	55	56	56	56	59	59	62	62	65	65	68	71	74	75	75	78	81

Source: La Liga
A = Away; H = Home; W = Win; D = Draw; L = Loss

==== Matches ====
The league fixtures were unveiled on 22 June 2023.

12 August 2023 1	Real Sociedad	1–1	Girona	San Sebastián
17:00 CEST (UTC+2)	Kubo 5'; Le Normand (yellow card) 45+3'; Olasagasti (yellow card) 85'	Report	Martínez (yellow card) 9'; Stuani (yellow card) 45+3'; Dovbyk 72'; Gutiérrez (yellow card) 79'; López (yellow card) 90+1'; Gazzaniga (yellow card) 90+2'	Stadium: Reale Arena; Attendance: 30,848; Referee: Francisco José Hernández Maeso

20 August 2023 2	Girona	3–0	Getafe	Girona
19:00 CEST (UTC+2)	Herrera 12'; Gazzaniga (yellow card) 45+3'; Stuani 55', 65'; Martín (yellow card) 62'	Report	Latasa (yellow card) 7'; Mayoral (yellow card) 28'; Mitrović (yellow card) 29'; Djené (yellow card) 50'; Duarte (yellow card) 90+3'	Stadium: Montilivi; Attendance: 11,784; Referee: Jorge Figueroa Vázquez

26 August 2023 3	Sevilla	1–2	Girona	Seville
21:30 CEST (UTC+2)	Gudelj 45+2'; Ocampos (yellow card) 58'; Salas (yellow card) 75'	Report	Herrera 16'; Martínez (yellow card) 37'; A. García 56'	Stadium: Ramón Sánchez Pizjuán; Attendance: 29,304; Referee: Jesús Gil Manzano

3 September 2023 4	Girona	1–0	Las Palmas	Girona
14:00 CEST (UTC+2)	Sávio (yellow card) 23'; López (yellow card) 67'; Couto (yellow card) 85'; Portu 88'	Report	S. Cardona (yellow card) 26'; Mármol (yellow card) 35'; Rodríguez (yellow card) 48'	Stadium: Montilivi; Attendance: 11,619; Referee: Mateo Busquets Ferrer

18 September 2023 5	Granada	2–4	Girona	Granada
21:00 CEST (UTC+2)	Uzuni (yellow card) 23', (goal) 63'; Melendo (yellow card) 33'; Torrente (yellow card) 70'; Boyé 85'	Report	Tsyhankov 22'; Sávio 31'; López 34'; Couto (yellow card) 72', (goal) 89'; Juanpe (yellow card) 90+4'; Herrera (yellow card) 90+7'	Stadium: Nuevo Los Cármenes; Attendance: 17,323; Referee: Isidro Díaz de Mera Escuderos

23 September 2023 6	Girona	5–3	Mallorca	Girona
14:00 CEST (UTC+2)	López 26'; Dovbyk 33' (pen.); Martín 37', (yellow card) 79'; Herrera 45'; Sávio 57'	Report	Muriqi 4' (pen.); S. Costa (yellow card) 31'; J. Costa (yellow card) 31'; Morlanes (yellow card) 33'; Rodríguez (yellow card) 38'; Abdón 88', 90+5'; Nastasić (yellow card) 90+1'	Stadium: Montilivi; Attendance: 11,511; Referee: Pablo González Fuertes

27 September 2023 7	Villarreal	1–2	Girona	Villarreal
19:00 CEST (UTC+2)	Pino (yellow card) 15'; Parejo 49' (pen.); Baena (yellow card) 87'; Brereton (yellow card) 90+1'	Report	Dovbyk 56'; Herrera (yellow card) 58'; E. García 61'; Gutiérrez (yellow card) 90+1'	Stadium: Estadio de la Cerámica; Attendance: 17,188; Referee: José María Sánchez Martínez

30 September 2023 8	Girona	0–3	Real Madrid	Girona
18:30 CEST (UTC+2)	E. García (yellow card) 64'; Stuani (yellow card) 90+5'	Report	Joselu 17'; Tchouaméni 21'; Bellingham 71'; Arrizabalaga (yellow card) 84'; Nacho (red card) 90+4'; Rüdiger (yellow card) 90+5'	Stadium: Montilivi; Attendance: 14,184; Referee: Juan Luis Pulido Santana

7 October 2023 9	Cádiz	0–1	Girona	Cádiz
14:00 CEST (UTC+2)	Alcaraz (yellow card) 2'; Machís (red card) 10'	Report	A. García (yellow card) 4', (goal) 59'; Herrera (yellow card) 45+4'; Kébé (yellow card) 90'	Stadium: Nuevo Mirandilla; Attendance: 16,438; Referee: Juan Martínez Munuera

22 October 2023 10	Girona	5–2	Almería	Girona
16:15 CEST (UTC+2)	Martín 37'; Dovbyk 39', 43'; López (yellow card) 45+4'; Sávio 71'; Stuani 85'	Report	Baptistão 2', 24', (yellow card) 74'; Robertone (yellow card) 26'; Kébé (yellow card) 90'	Stadium: Montilivi; Attendance: 12,884; Referee: Miguel Ángel Ortiz Arias

27 October 2023 11	Girona	1–0	Celta Vigo	Girona
21:00 CEST (UTC+2)	Couto (yellow card) 45+7'; Stuani (yellow card) 77'; Juanpe (yellow card) 82'; Herrera 90+1'	Report	Vázquez (yellow card) 55'; Núñez (yellow card) 77'	Stadium: Montilivi; Attendance: 12,671; Referee: Isidro Díaz de Mera Escuderos

4 November 2023 12	Osasuna	2–4	Girona	Pamplona
14:00 CET (UTC+1)	Budimir 25', 55', (yellow card) 51'; Ávila (yellow card) 40'; Catena (yellow card) 41'; Torró (yellow card) 87'; Fernández (yellow card) 87'	Report	Martín 16'; Dovbyk 71'; Martínez (yellow card) 72'; Tsyhankov 80'; Herrera (yellow card) 85'; A. García 90'; Stuani (yellow card) 90+5'	Stadium: El Sadar; Attendance: 20,100; Referee: José Luis Munuera Montero

11 November 2023 13	Rayo Vallecano	1–2	Girona	Madrid
14:00 CET (UTC+1)	García 5', (yellow card) 44'	Report	Gutiérrez (yellow card) 14'; Dovbyk 42'; Sávio 65'; Martín (yellow card) 73'	Stadium: Campo de Fútbol de Vallecas; Attendance: 13,177; Referee: Pablo González Fuertes

27 November 2023 14	Girona	1–1	Athletic Bilbao	Girona
21:00 CET (UTC+1)	Tsyhankov 55'; Blind (yellow card) 59'	Report	Guruzeta (yellow card) 51'; I. Williams 67'	Stadium: Montilivi; Attendance: 13,123; Referee: Mario Melero López

2 December 2023 15	Girona	2–1	Valencia	Girona
14:00 CET (UTC+1)	Blind (yellow card) 36'; Couto (yellow card) 42'; Stuani 82', 88'; Sávio (yellow card) 90+2'	Report	Duro 56', (yellow card) 77'; Gasiorowski (yellow card) 61'; Gabriel (yellow card) 90+6'	Stadium: Montilivi; Attendance: 13,343; Referee: Javier Iglesias Villanueva

10 December 2023 16	Barcelona	2–4	Girona	Barcelona
21:00 CET (UTC+1)	Lewandowski 19'; Gündoğan 90+2'; Araújo (yellow card) 90+7'	Report	Dovbyk 12'; Gutiérrez 40'; Blind (yellow card) 64'; Valery 80'; Stuani 90+5', (yellow card) 90+6'	Stadium: Estadi Olímpic Lluís Companys; Attendance: 42,848; Referee: Isidro Díaz de Mera Escuderos

18 December 2023 17	Girona	3–0	Alavés	Girona
21:00 CET (UTC+1)	Dovbyk 23', 59' (pen.); Portu 42'	Report	Tenaglia (yellow card) 39'	Stadium: Montilivi; Attendance: 11,812; Referee: Francisco José Hernández Maeso

21 December 2023 18	Real Betis	1–1	Girona	Seville
19:00 CET (UTC+1)	Guardado (yellow card) 45+3'; Roca (yellow card) 45+6'; Pezzella 88'	Report	Dovbyk 39' (pen.), (yellow card) 44'; A. García (yellow card) 82'	Stadium: Benito Villamarín; Attendance: 51,394; Referee: Ricardo de Burgos Bengoetxea

3 January 2024 19	Girona	4–3	Atlético Madrid	Girona
21:30 CET (UTC+1)	Valery 2'; Sávio 26'; Blind 39'; Martín 90+1'	Report	Morata 14', 44', 54'; Hermoso (yellow card) 90'	Stadium: Montilivi; Attendance: 13,804; Referee: Alejandro Hernández Hernández

14 January 2024 20	Almería	0–0	Girona	Almería
14:00 CET (UTC+1)	Baptistão (yellow card) 21'; Akieme (yellow card) 56'; Montes (yellow card) 79'; Kaiky (yellow card) 84'	Report	Valery (yellow card) 34'; Juanpe (yellow card) 64'; Sávio (yellow card) 71'; A. García (red card) 80'; Martínez (yellow card) 90+7'	Stadium: Power Horse Stadium; Attendance: 12,111; Referee: Mateo Busquets Ferrer

21 January 2024 21	Girona	5–1	Sevilla	Girona
21:00 CET (UTC+1)	Dovbyk 13', 15', 19'; Tsyhankov 56'; Stuani 89'	Report	Romero 10'; Sow (yellow card) 61'; Mejbri (yellow card) 63'	Stadium: Montilivi; Attendance: 13,092; Referee: Pablo González Fuertes

28 January 2024 22	Celta Vigo	0–1	Girona	Vigo
14:00 CET (UTC+1)	Jailson (yellow card) 71'	Report	Portu 20'; Blind (yellow card) 50'	Stadium: Balaídos; Attendance: 20,684; Referee: Mario Melero López

3 February 2024 23	Girona	0–0	Real Sociedad	Girona
21:00 CET (UTC+1)	Herrera (yellow card) 88'; Blind (yellow card) 90+7'	Report	Turrientes (yellow card) 21'; Méndez (yellow card) 45+1'; Zubeldia (yellow card) 64'	Stadium: Montilivi; Attendance: 13,755; Referee: Jesús Gil Manzano

10 February 2024 24	Real Madrid	4–0	Girona	Madrid
18:30 CET (UTC+1)	Vinícius 6'; Bellingham 35', 54'; Rodrygo 61'; Mendy (yellow card) 76'; Joselu (penalty missed) 90+1'	Report	Juanpe (yellow card) 21'; Couto (yellow card) 68'	Stadium: Santiago Bernabéu; Attendance: 76,585; Referee: Juan Martínez Munuera

19 February 2024 25	Athletic Bilbao	3–2	Girona	Bilbao
21:00 CET (UTC+1)	Berengeur 2', 56'; Lekue (yellow card) 25'; I. Williams 60'	Report	Juan Carlos (yellow card) 20'; Tsyhankov 49'; E. García 75'	Stadium: San Mamés; Attendance: 46,220; Referee: José María Sánchez Martínez

26 February 2024 26	Girona	3–0	Rayo Vallecano	Girona
21:00 CET (UTC+1)	Tsyhankov 52'; A. García (yellow card) 54'; Couto (yellow card) 85'; Sávio 90+1', 90+5', (yellow card) 90+1'	Report	Ciss (yellow card) 65'; Crespo (yellow card) 73'; Chavarría (yellow card) 75' (yellow-red card) 76'; Pérez (yellow card) 81'	Stadium: Montilivi; Attendance: 8,923; Referee: Ricardo de Burgos Bengoetxea

3 March 2024 27	Mallorca	1–0	Girona	Palma
18:30 CET (UTC+1)	Copete 33'; Valjent (yellow card) 37'; Lato (yellow card) 59'; Mascarell (yellow card) 74'; Abdón (yellow card) 76'; Darder (yellow card) 90+3'	Report		Stadium: Estadi Mallorca Son Moix; Attendance: 17,769; Referee: Francisco José Hernández Maeso

9 March 2024 28	Girona	2–0	Osasuna	Girona
21:00 CET (UTC+1)	Portu 13', (yellow card) 68'; Martín (yellow card) 35'; E. García (yellow card) 58'; Sávio 86'	Report	Herrando (yellow card) 45'; Areso (yellow card) 72'; Gómez (yellow card) 90+4'	Stadium: Montilivi; Attendance: 11,598; Referee: Mateo Busquets Ferrer

16 March 2024 29	Getafe	1–0	Girona	Getafe
18:30 CET (UTC+1)	Alderete (yellow card) 11'; Santiago 33'; Milla (yellow card) 52'; Óscar (yellow card) 90'; Carmona (yellow card) 90+4'	Report	Sávio (yellow card) 9'; A. García (yellow card) 15'; Portu (yellow card) 39'; Stuani (yellow card) 86'	Stadium: Coliseum; Attendance: 12,912; Referee: José Luis Munuera Montero

31 March 2024 30	Girona	3–2	Real Betis	Girona
16:15 CEST (UTC+2)	Dovbyk 36' (pen.), 65'; Martín (yellow card) 41'; Torre (yellow card) 88'; Stuani 90+2'; Herrera (yellow card) 90+5'	Report	Isco (yellow card) 31'; Riad (yellow card) 45+1'; Willian José 45+4', 76'; Ávila (yellow card) 83'; Fornals (yellow card) 90+5'	Stadium: Montilivi; Attendance: 12,774; Referee: Jesús Gil Manzano

13 April 2024 31	Atlético Madrid	3–1	Girona	Madrid
14:00 CEST (UTC+2)	Saúl (yellow card) 25'; Griezmann 34' (pen.), 50'; Correa (yellow card) 35', (goal) 45+6'; Llorente (yellow card) 90+2'	Report	Dovbyk 4'; Herrera (yellow card) 32'; Couto (yellow card) 70'	Stadium: Cívitas Metropolitano; Attendance: 64,214; Referee: Ricardo de Burgos Bengoetxea

20 April 2024 32	Girona	4–1	Cádiz	Girona
21:00 CEST (UTC+2)	E. García 9'; Martín 22'; Gutiérrez (yellow card) 42'; Dovbyk 71'; Portu 82'	Report	Fernández (yellow card) 31'; Chust (yellow card) 75'; Escalante 81'	Stadium: Montilivi; Attendance: 12,665; Referee: Javier Alberola Rojas

27 April 2024 33	Las Palmas	0–2	Girona	Las Palmas
13:00 WEST (UTC+1)	Sandro (penalty missed) 8'; Rodríguez (yellow card) 39'; Mármol (yellow card) 45+4'	Report	Dovbyk (penalty missed) 26', (yellow card) 37', (goal) 57' (pen.); López 26'; Herrera (yellow card) 39'; Couto (yellow card) 69'	Stadium: Estadio Gran Canaria; Attendance: 18,734; Referee: Jorge Figueroa Vázquez

4 May 2024 34	Girona	4–2	Barcelona	Girona
18:30 CEST (UTC+2)	Dovbyk 4'; Portu 65', 74'; Gutiérrez 67'	Report	Christensen 3'; Koundé (yellow card) 28'; Araújo (yellow card) 39'; Roberto (yellow card) 43'; Lewandowski 45+1' (pen.)	Stadium: Montilivi; Attendance: 14,090; Referee: Alejandro Hernández Hernández

10 May 2024 35	Alavés	2–2	Girona	Vitoria-Gasteiz
21:00 CEST (UTC+2)	Guridi 12', 90+9'; Rioja (yellow card) 90+4'; Owono (yellow card) 90+4'; Marín (yellow card) 90+9'	Report	E. García 4'; Herrera 44', (yellow card) 90+8'; Martínez (yellow card) 88'	Stadium: Mendizorrotza; Attendance: 17,906; Referee: José Luis Munuera Montero

14 May 2024 36	Girona	0–1	Villarreal	Girona
22:00 CEST (UTC+2)	Blind (yellow card) 36'	Report	Femenía (yellow card) 41' (yellow-red card) 90+5'; Baena (yellow card) 43'; Traoré (yellow card) 56', (goal) 59'; Terrats (yellow card) 90+3'	Stadium: Montilivi; Attendance: 11,440; Referee: José María Sánchez Martínez

19 May 2024 37	Valencia	1–3	Girona	Valencia
19:00 CEST (UTC+2)	Foulquier (yellow card) 26'; Pepelu 84' (pen.); Correia (yellow card) 90+2'	Report	Sávio 32'; Dovbyk 58'; Gasiorowski 67' (o.g.)	Stadium: Mestalla; Attendance: 36,138; Referee: Guillermo Cuadra Fernández

24 May 2024 38	Girona	7–0	Granada	Girona
21:00 CEST (UTC+2)	E. García 30', (yellow card) 82'; López (yellow card) 32'; Tsyhankov 33', 54'; Dovbyk 44' (pen.), 75', 90' (pen.); Portu (yellow card) 45+4'; Stuani 78'	Report	Ruiz (yellow card) 36'; Pellistri (yellow card) 39' (yellow-red card) 61'; Sánchez (yellow card) 43'; Callejón (yellow card) 62'	Stadium: Montilivi; Attendance: 12,813; Referee: Alejandro Muñiz Ruiz

=== Copa del Rey ===
1 November 2023 First round	San Roque Lepe	1–2	Girona	Lepe
12:00 CET (UTC+1)	P. Becken (yellow card) 31'; Mizzian 51'; C. Becken (yellow card) 62'; F. López (yellow card) 83'	Report	Valery 48'; Selvi (yellow card) 83'; Sávio 90+8', (yellow card) 90+9'	Stadium: Ciudad de Lepe; Attendance: 3,000; Referee: Francisco José Hernández Maeso

7 December 2023 Second round	Orihuela	2–5	Girona	Orihuela
21:00 CET (UTC+1)	Mendinueta 27'; Booker 45+3'; Muñoz (yellow card) 49'	Report	Torre 7'; Stuani 66', 74', (yellow card) 70'; Portu 82'; Valery 87'	Stadium: Los Arcos; Attendance: 7,000; Referee: Asier Pérez de Mendiola

6 January 2024 Round of 32	Elche	0–2	Girona	Elche
18:00 CET (UTC+1)	Bigas (yellow card) 24'; Morente (yellow card) 90+1'	Report	Blind 37'; Couto 67'	Stadium: Martínez Valero; Attendance: 15,518; Referee: Javier Alberola Rojas

17 January 2024 Round of 16	Girona	3–1	Rayo Vallecano	Girona
21:30 CET (UTC+1)	Stuani 15', 19' (pen.), (yellow card) 45+2'; Blind 26'	Report	Nteka 36', (yellow card) 45+2'	Stadium: Montilivi; Attendance: 7,911; Referee: Jorge Figueroa Vázquez

24 January 2024 Quarter-finals	Mallorca	3–2	Girona	Palma
19:30 CET (UTC+1)	Larin 21'; Abdón 28', 35' (pen.); Rodríguez (yellow card) 37'; J. Costa (yellow card) 39'; Raíllo (yellow card) 67' (yellow-red card) 67'; Greif (yellow card) 72'; S. Costa (yellow card) 90+4'; Nastasić (yellow card) 90+8'	Report	Stuani 68' (pen.); Blind (yellow card) 90+4'; Couto (yellow card) 90+4'; Sávio 90+6'	Stadium: Estadi Mallorca Son Moix; Attendance: 19,950; Referee: José Luis Munuera Montero

== Statistics ==
=== Squad statistics ===
As of match played 24 May 2024.

No.	Pos	Nat	Player	Total		La Liga		Copa del Rey	
No.	Pos	Nat	Player	Apps	Goals	Apps	Goals	Apps	Goals
Goalkeepers
1	GK	(Spain) ESP	Juan Carlos	3	0	0	0	3	0
13	GK	(Argentina) ARG	Paulo Gazzaniga	38	0	38	0	0	0
26	GK	(Spain) ESP	Toni Fuidias	2	0	0	0	2	0
Defenders
3	DF	(Spain) ESP	Miguel Gutiérrez	40	2	35	2	4+1	0
4	DF	(Spain) ESP	Arnau Martínez	26	0	14+7	0	5	0
5	DF	(Spain) ESP	David López	25	3	25	3	0	0
11	DF	(Spain) ESP	Valery Fernández	32	4	2+25	2	3+2	2
15	DF	(Spain) ESP	Juanpe	21	0	6+11	0	4	0
17	DF	(Netherlands) NED	Daley Blind	37	3	33+1	1	2+1	2
20	DF	(Brazil) BRA	Yan Couto	39	2	24+10	1	1+4	1
25	DF	(Spain) ESP	Eric García	31	5	30	5	1+0	0
35	DF	(Hungary) HUN	Antal Yaakobishvili	3	0	0+1	0	1+1	0
Midfielders
8	MF	(Ukraine) UKR	Viktor Tsyhankov	34	8	26+4	8	3+1	0
10	MF	(Spain) ESP	Borja García	0	0	0	0	0	0
14	MF	(Spain) ESP	Aleix García	40	3	36+1	3	1+2	0
18	MF	(Spain) ESP	Pablo Torre	29	1	4+22	0	1+2	1
19	MF	(Spain) ESP	Toni Villa	2	0	0+2	0	0	0
21	MF	(Venezuela) VEN	Yangel Herrera	31	5	27+2	5	2	0
22	MF	(Colombia) COL	Jhon Solís	22	0	2+16	0	4	0
23	MF	(Spain) ESP	Iván Martín	40	5	33+3	5	2+2	0
28	MF	(Spain) ESP	Selvi	2	0	0+1	0	0+1	0
32	MF	(Spain) ESP	Enric García	1	0	0	0	0+1	0
Forwards
7	FW	(Uruguay) URU	Cristhian Stuani	36	14	5+26	9	5	5
9	FW	(Ukraine) UKR	Artem Dovbyk	39	24	32+4	24	0+3	0
16	FW	(Brazil) BRA	Sávio	41	11	35+2	9	2+2	2
24	FW	(Spain) ESP	Portu	38	8	11+22	7	4+1	1
30	FW	(Spain) ESP	Iker Almena	1	0	0	0	1	0
31	FW	(Portugal) POR	Jastin García	3	0	0+3	0	0	0
Players transferred out during the season
2	DF	(Colombia) COL	Bernardo Espinosa	4	0	0+2	0	2	0
6	MF	(Mali) MLI	Ibrahima Kébé	5	0	0+2	0	2+1	0
