= Eric Garcia (footballer, born 2001) =

Spanish footballer (born 2001)

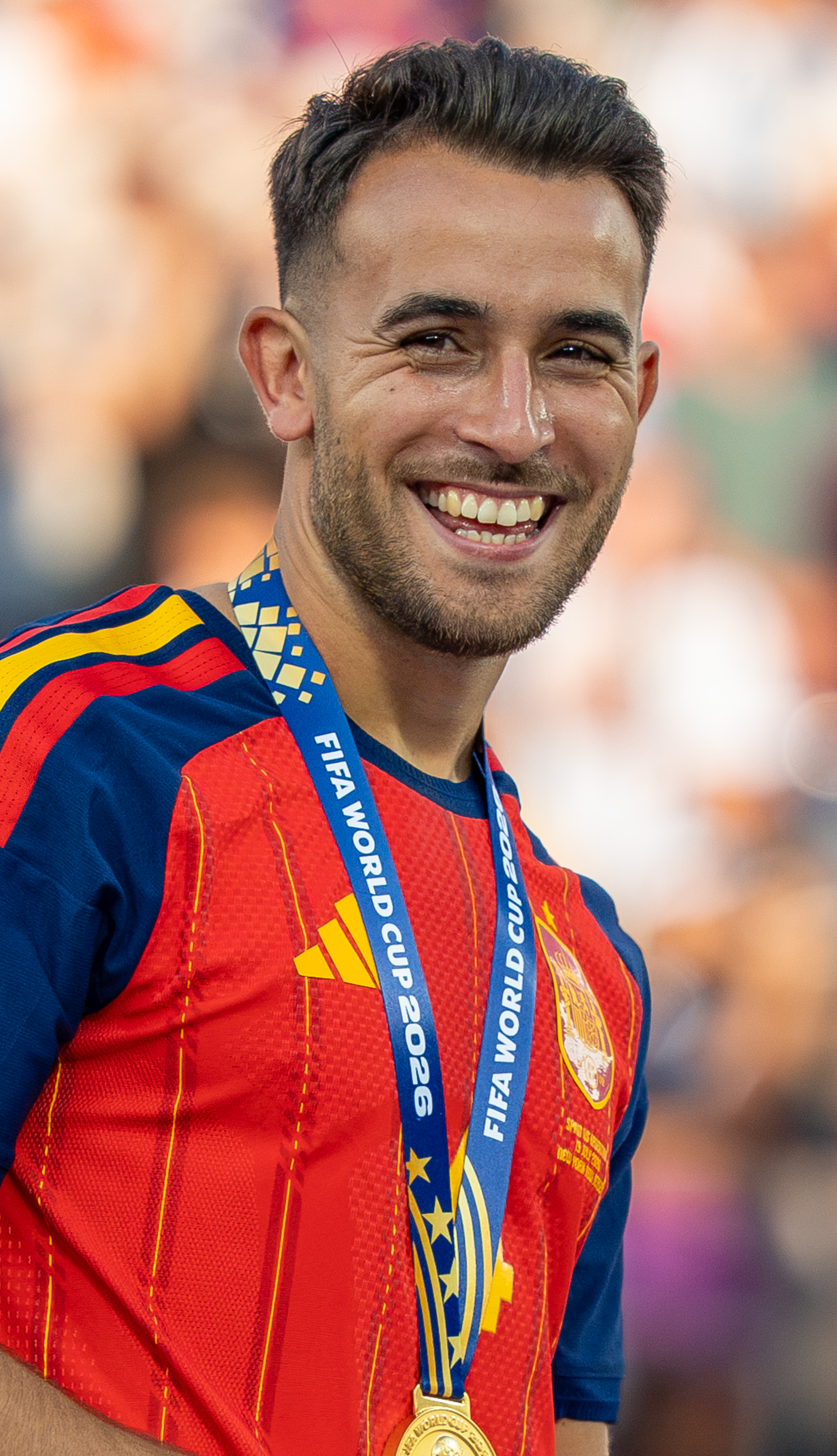
- Garcia with Spain in 2026

Personal information
- Full name: Eric Garcia Martret
- Date of birth: 8 January 2001 (age 25)
- Place of birth: Martorell, Spain
- Height: 1.80 m (5 ft 11 in)
- Positions: Defender; defensive midfielder

Team information
- Current team: Barcelona
- Number: 24

Youth career
- 2008–2017: Barcelona
- 2017–2019: Manchester City

Senior career*
Years	Team	Apps	(Gls)
2018–2021	Manchester City	19	(0)
2021–	Barcelona	125	(5)
2023–2024	→ Girona (loan)	32	(5)

International career^{‡}
2017	Spain U16	9	(0)
2017–2018	Spain U17	9	(0)
2019	Spain U19	9	(0)
2019	Spain U21	5	(0)
2021–2024	Spain U23	12	(0)
2020–	Spain	22	(0)
2024–	Catalonia	2	(0)
Medal record
Men's football
Representing Spain
FIFA World Cup
Winner	2026 Canada–Mexico–US
UEFA European Championship
Bronze medal – third place	2020 Europe
UEFA Nations League
Runner-up	2021 Italy
Olympic Games
Gold medal – first place	2024 Paris	Team
Silver medal – second place	2020 Tokyo	Team
UEFA European Under-19 Championship
Winner	2019 Armenia	Team
FIFA U-17 World Cup
Runner-up	2017 India	Team
UEFA European Under-17 Championship
Winner	2017 Croatia	Team
- * Club domestic league appearances and goals as of 23:32, 22 November 2026 (UTC) ‡ National team caps and goals as of 19 July 2026

Eric Garcia Martret (Catalan pronunciation: [ˈeɾik ɡaɾˈsia] Spanish pronunciation: [ˈeɾik ɡaɾˈθia]; born 9 January 2001) is a Spanish professional footballer who plays as a centre-back for La Liga club Barcelona and the Spain national team. A versatile player, he can also be deployed as a full-back or defensive midfielder.

Garcia moved from Barcelona at the age of 17 to Manchester City in 2018. He made his Premier League debut in September 2019. In his final season at the club, he won the league and was runner-up in the UEFA Champions League. In June 2021, Garcia rejoined Barcelona on a free transfer, following the expiration of his contract. He moved on loan to Girona in the 2023–24 season, and upon returning to Barcelona, won the 2025 and 2026 La Liga titles with the club.

Garcia was part of the Spain team for UEFA Euro 2020 and two FIFA World Cups in 2022 and 2026, winning the latter.

== Club career ==
=== Early career ===
Born in Martorell, Barcelona, Catalonia, Garcia was a part of La Masia, the Barcelona academy, before joining Manchester City in 2017. During his first season at City, he captained the under-18s and played for the under-19s in the UEFA Youth League.

=== Manchester City ===
He joined up with City's first team during their 2018 summer pre-season in the United States. On 18 December 2018, Garcia made his debut for City, starting in the EFL Cup quarter-final against Leicester City. He played in a centre-back pairing with Nicolás Otamendi, with the game finishing 1–1, City winning the tie on penalties. He made his Premier League debut on 21 September 2019 when he came on as a 63rd-minute substitute for Otamendi in an 8–0 win over Watford.

Garcia played two full games back-to-back for City over the Christmas and New Year period in 2019. The first game was against Sheffield United at home, which City won 2–0. A second home game in a couple of days, saw a second start for Garcia, with City recording a 2–1 victory against Everton.

On 17 June 2020, Garcia was in the starting eleven against Arsenal for City's first game back after the COVID-19 pandemic break, with City recording a 3–0 win. Towards the end of the game, he was involved in a collision with City goalkeeper Ederson and initially left him unconscious. Garcia received lengthy on-field treatment before being stretchered off and supplied with oxygen. Despite the seriousness of the incident, Garcia was discharged from hospital the next day. Then-manager Pep Guardiola stated in a press conference Garcia's injury was a concussion and expected him to be fit within 10 days.

On 6 August 2020, Guardiola announced in a press conference that Garcia had rejected a contract extension, despite ending the league campaign as City's first-choice partner alongside central defender and compatriot Aymeric Laporte.

=== Barcelona ===
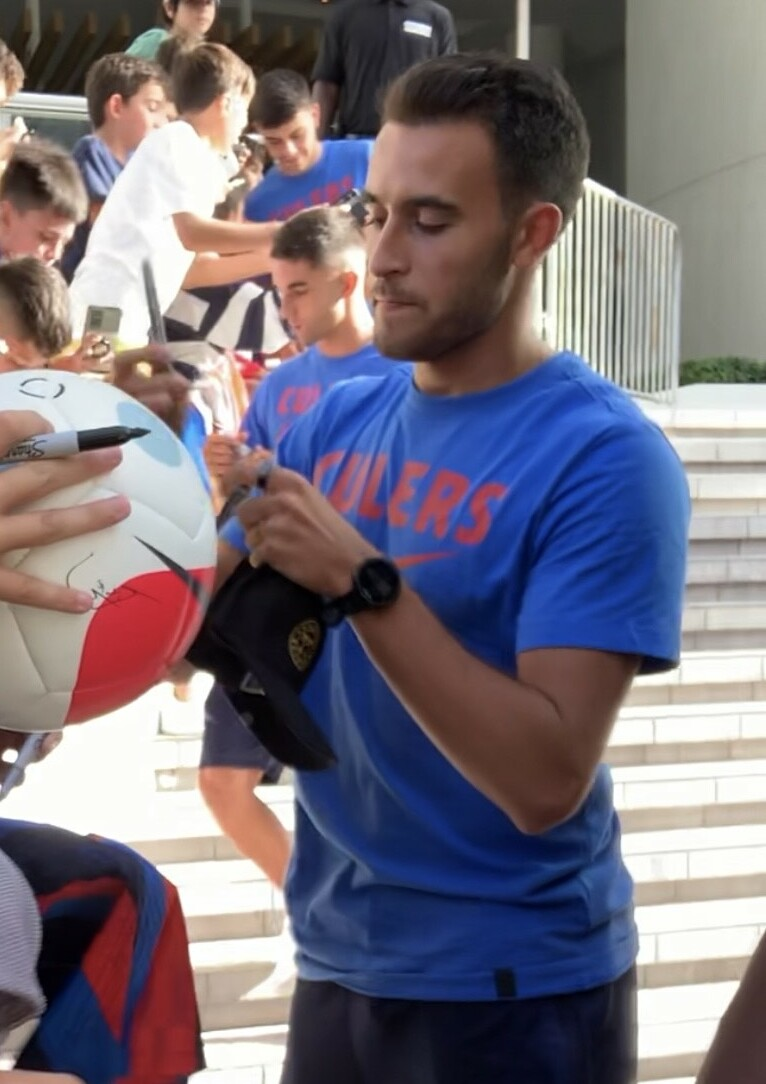
Garcia signing memorabilia with Barcelona in 2022

On 1 June 2021, Garcia agreed to sign for La Liga club Barcelona on a free transfer on a five-year contract starting 1 July, with a buyout clause set at €400 million. On 15 August, he played his first competitive match for the club as he started the league opening game, a 4–2 victory against Real Sociedad. On 21 August, he was sent off after receiving a straight red card for his last-ditch tackle on Nico Williams in a 1–1 draw against Athletic Bilbao. On 29 September, Garcia was sent off for the second time after receiving two yellow cards in a 3–0 Champions League group stage thrashing by Benfica.

==== Loan to Girona ====
On 1 September 2023, Garcia was loaned to fellow top tier side Girona for the 2023–24 season. On 27 September, he scored his first goal for Girona to secure a 2–1 away win over Villarreal, which granted his club the top place in La Liga after seven matches for the first time in their history. He eventually scored five goals in total, becoming one of the league's top-scoring defenders.

==== Return to Barcelona ====
Garcia returned to Barcelona after his loan spell ended. On 4 January 2025, he scored his first goal since rejoining the team in a 4–0 away victory over UD Barbastro in the Copa del Rey. On 21 January, he netted his maiden Champions League goal in a 5–4 away victory over Benfica.

Later, on 6 May 2025, in the second leg of the Champions League semi-final against Inter Milan, Garcia started as a right-back due to the injury to Jules Koundé and scored the first goal for Barcelona after they went down 2–0 in the first half. Just five days later, in a home El Clásico showdown against Real Madrid, Garcia once again scored the first goal for Barcelona after they went down 2-0 in the first half, marking his first career El Clásico goal.

After an impressive 2024–25 season under Hansi Flick, he became a regular member of Barcelona's squad during the 2025–26 season, featuring consistently across all competitions. On 25 September 2025, he scored his first goal of the season in a 3–1 comeback victory over Real Oviedo in La Liga.

On 11 December 2025, Garcia signed a new long term deal at the club, keeping him at the club till 30 June 2031. In the second leg of the 2025–26 UEFA Champions League quarter-finals against Atlético Madrid, he was sent off in the 79th minute after a VAR review overturned the referee's initial decision, with the dismissal reducing Barcelona to ten men as they were eliminated 3–2 on aggregate.

== International career ==
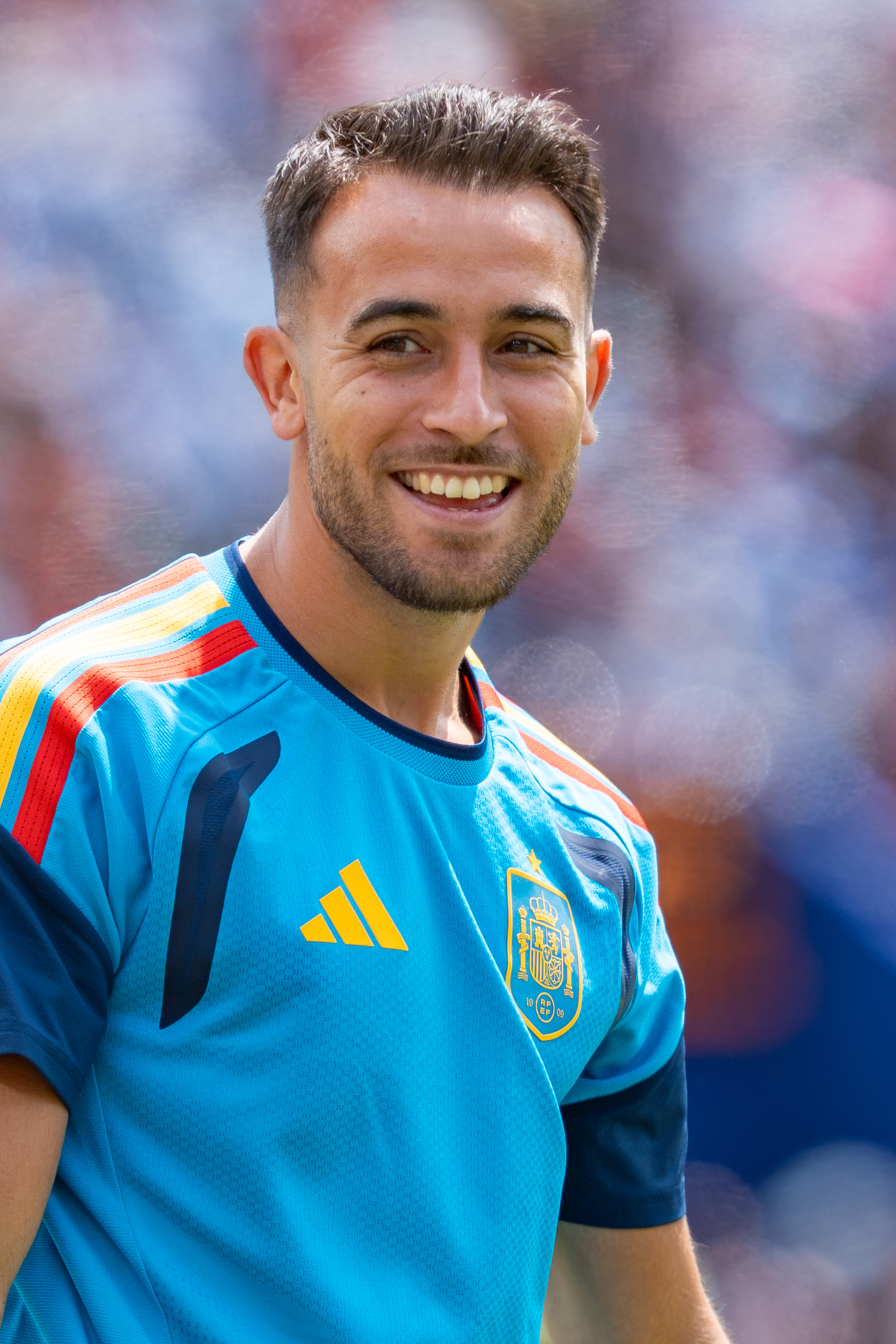
Garcia training with Spain ahead of the 2026 FIFA World Cup final

After representing Spain at under-19 and under-21 levels, Garcia received his first senior call-up on 20 August 2020, for two UEFA Nations League fixtures against Germany and Ukraine. He made his senior international debut against Ukraine on 6 September, replacing Sergio Ramos in the 61st minute as Spain won 4–0. On 24 May 2021, Garcia was included in Luis Enrique's 24-man squad for UEFA Euro 2020. Additionally, Garcia was included in the squad for the 2020 Summer Olympics in Tokyo.

In November 2022, Garcia was selected in Enrique's 26-man Spain squad for the 2022 FIFA World Cup.

On 25 May 2026, Garcia was named in Spain's 26-man squad for the 2026 FIFA World Cup. A substitute, he played only one match, coming on during extra time in the final, as Spain defeated Argentina 1–0 after extra time to win the title.

== Career statistics ==
=== Club ===
As of match played 22 November 2026

Appearances and goals by club, season and competition
Club	Season	League			National cup (Note: Includes FA Cup, Copa del Rey)		League cup (Note: Includes EFL Cup)		Europe		Other		Total	
Club	Season	Division	Apps	Goals	Apps	Goals	Apps	Goals	Apps	Goals	Apps	Goals	Apps	Goals
Manchester City U21	2018–19	—			—		—		—		1 (Note: Appearance in EFL Trophy)	0	1	0
Manchester City	2018–19	Premier League	0	0	0	0	3	0	0	0	0	0	3	0
Manchester City	2019–20	Premier League	13	0	2	0	3	0	2 (Note: Appearances in UEFA Champions League)	0	0	0	20	0
Manchester City	2020–21	Premier League	6	0	2	0	1	0	3	0	—		12	0
Manchester City	Total		19	0	4	0	7	0	5	0	0	0	35	0
Barcelona	2021–22	La Liga	26	0	1	0	—		9 (Note: Four appearances in UEFA Champions League, five appearances in UEFA Europa League)	0	0	0	36	0
Barcelona	2022–23	La Liga	24	1	3	0	—		4	0	1 (Note: Appearance in Supercopa de España)	0	32	1
Barcelona	2023–24	La Liga	2	0	—		—		—		—		2	0
Barcelona	2024–25	La Liga	29	2	6	1	—		9	2	1	0	45	5
Barcelona	2025–26	La Liga	34	1	4	0	—		11	0	2	0	51	1
Barcelona	2026–27	La Liga	10	1	0	0	—		1	0	0	0	11	1
Barcelona	Total		125	5	14	1	0	0	34	2	4	0	177	8
Girona (loan)	2023–24	La Liga	32	5	1	0	—		—		—		33	5
Career total			176	10	19	1	7	0	39	2	4	0	245	13

=== International ===
As of match played 19 July 2026

Appearances and goals by national team and year
National team	Year	Apps	Goals
Spain	2020	4	0
Spain	2021	10	0
Spain	2022	5	0
Spain	2023	0	0
Spain	2024	0	0
Spain	2025	0	0
Spain	2026	3	0
Total		22	0

== Honours ==
Manchester City

- Premier League: 2020–21
- EFL Cup: 2019–20
- FA Community Shield: 2019
- UEFA Champions League runner-up: 2020–21

Barcelona

- La Liga: 2022–23, 2024–25, 2025–26
- Copa del Rey: 2024–25
- Supercopa de España: 2023, 2025, 2026

Spain U17

- UEFA European Under-17 Championship: 2017
- FIFA U-17 World Cup runner-up: 2017

Spain U19

- UEFA European Under-19 Championship: 2019

Spain U23

- Olympic Gold Medal: 2024; silver medal: 2020

Spain

- FIFA World Cup: 2026
- UEFA Nations League runner-up: 2020–21

Individual

- UEFA European Under-19 Championship Team of the Tournament: 2019
- IFFHS Men's Youth (U20) World Team: 2021
- IFFHS Men's Youth (U20) UEFA Team: 2020, 2021
- La Liga Team of the Season: 2025-26
