= 2022–23 Girona FC season =

Girona FC
2022–23 season
- President: Delfí Geli
- Head coach: Míchel
- Stadium: Estadi Montilivi
- La Liga: 10th
- Copa del Rey: Second round
- Top goalscorer: League: Taty Castellanos (13); All: Taty Castellanos (14)
| Home colours | Away colours | Third colours |

The 2022–23 season was the 93rd season in the history of Girona FC and their first season back in the top flight since 2019. The club participated in La Liga and the Copa del Rey.

== Players ==
=== First-team squad ===
As of 4 February 2023

Note: Flags indicate national team as defined under FIFA eligibility rules; some limited exceptions apply. Players may hold more than one non-FIFA nationality.

| No. | Pos. | Nation | Player |
|---|---|---|---|
| 1 | GK | ESP | Juan Carlos |
| 2 | DF | COL | Bernardo Espinosa |
| 3 | DF | ESP | Miguel Gutiérrez |
| 4 | DF | ESP | Arnau Martínez |
| 5 | DF | ESP | David López |
| 6 | MF | MLI | Ibrahima Kebe |
| 7 | FW | URU | Cristhian Stuani (captain) |
| 8 | MF | UKR | Viktor Tsyhankov |
| 9 | FW | ARG | Taty Castellanos (on loan from New York City FC) |
| 11 | FW | ESP | Valery Fernández |
| 12 | MF | ESP | Toni Villa |
| 13 | GK | ARG | Paulo Gazzaniga (on loan from Fulham) |
| 14 | MF | ESP | Aleix García |

| No. | Pos. | Nation | Player |
|---|---|---|---|
| 15 | DF | ESP | Juanpe (vice-captain) |
| 16 | DF | ESP | Javi Hernández (on loan from Leganés) |
| 17 | FW | ESP | Rodrigo Riquelme (on loan from Atlético Madrid) |
| 18 | MF | ESP | Oriol Romeu |
| 19 | MF | BRA | Reinier (on loan from Real Madrid) |
| 20 | DF | BRA | Yan Couto (on loan from Manchester City) |
| 21 | MF | VEN | Yangel Herrera (on loan from Manchester City) |
| 22 | DF | URU | Santiago Bueno |
| 23 | MF | ESP | Iván Martín (on loan from Villarreal) |
| 24 | MF | ESP | Borja García |
| 25 | DF | PER | Alexander Callens |
| 26 | GK | ESP | Toni Fuidias |

== Transfers ==
=== In ===
| Date | Player | From | Type | Fee | Ref. |
|---|---|---|---|---|---|
| 4 July 2022 | (Spain) Iván Marin | Villarreal | Loan extension | | |
| 5 August 2022 | (Spain) Miguel Gutiérrez | Real Madrid | Transfer | Undisclosed | |
| 19 August 2022 | (Brazil) Reinier | Real Madrid | Loan | | |

=== Out ===
| Date | Player | To | Type | Fee | Ref. |
|---|---|---|---|---|---|
| 1 July 2022 | (Spain) Álex Baena | Villarreal | Loan return | | |
| 1 July 2022 | (Argentina) Nahuel Bustos | (England) Manchester City | Loan return | | |
| 1 July 2022 | (Spain) Jairo Izquierdo | Cartagena | Transfer | Free | |
| 1 July 2022 | (Spain) David Juncà | Released | | | |
| 1 July 2022 | (Spain) Pol Lozano | Espanyol | Loan return | | |
| 1 July 2022 | (Spain) Pablo Moreno | (England) Manchester City | Loan return | | |
| 1 July 2022 | (Spain) Víctor Sánchez | Released | | | |
| 1 July 2022 | (Argentina) Darío Sarmiento | (England) Manchester City | Loan return | | |
| 14 July 2022 | (Spain) Álex Gallar | Released | | | |
| 5 August 2022 | (Spain) Adrián Ortolá | (Belgium) Deinze | Transfer | Undisclosed | |

== Pre-season and friendlies ==
Win Draw Loss Fixtures

| 22 July 2022 Friendly | Benfica | 4–2 | Girona | Yverdon-les-Bains, Switzerland |
| 17:30 CEST (UTC+02:00) | Vertonghen 57'; Bah 60'; Yaremchuk 67' (pen.); A. Silva (yellow card) 80'; Pinho 89' | | Sáiz (yellow card) 37'; Stuani 52'; Bueno 77'; Sala (yellow card) 90+1' | Stadium: Stade Municipal; Referee: Tobias Thies (Switzerland) |

| 27 July 2022 Friendly | Girona | 2–0 | Andorra | Roses |
| 19:00 CEST (UTC+2) | Terrats 7'; Castellanos 65' | | | Stadium: Camps Municipals de Futbol La Vinyassa |

| 3 August 2022 Friendly | Napoli | 3–1 | Girona | Castel di Sangro, Italy |
| 20:30 CEST (UTC+2) | López 27' (o.g.); Petagna 77'; Kvaratskhelia 80' (pen.) | Report | Castellanos 56' | Stadium: Stadio Teofilo Patini; Referee: Juan Luca Sacchi (Italy) |

| 6 August 2022 Costa Brava Trophy | Girona | 2–0 | Bolívar | Palamós |
| 21:00 CEST (UTC+2) | Castellanos 19'; Guitián 52' (o.g.) | | Rodríguez (yellow card) 53'; Fernández (yellow card) 60'; Justiniano (yellow card) 62' | Stadium: Estadi Palamós Costa Brava; Attendance: 2,567; Referee: Moreno Aragón (Spain) |
Note: The match was suspended in the 70th minute due to a power outage.

| 7 August 2022 Friendly | Girona | 1–1 | Zaragoza | Girona |
| 19:00 CEST (UTC+2) | Stuani (yellow card) 35'; Riquelme 73' | | Gámez (yellow card) 35'; Eugeni 45+1'; Puche (yellow card) 70' | Stadium: Centre d'entrenament La Vinya; Attendance: 0 Referee: Morros Monge |

| 8 December 2022 Friendly | Girona | 1–0 | Standard Liège | Estepona |
| 11:00 CET (UTC+1) | Sáiz 48' | Report | | Stadium: Complejo Deportivo Arroyo Enmedio |

| 10 December 2022 Friendly | Nice | 1–2 | Girona | San Pedro de Alcántara |
| 11:00 CET (UTC+1) | Brahimi 11' | | Roca 90+'; Hernández 90+' | Stadium: Marbella Football Center |

| 14 December 2022 Friendly | Girona | 1–1 | Osasuna | Girona |
| 11:00 CET (UTC+1) | Roca (yellow card) 29'; García 72' | | Torró 66' | Stadium: Montilivi |

| 17 December 2022 Friendly | Manchester City | 2–0 | Girona | Manchester, England |
| 14:00 CET (UTC+1) | De Bruyne 5'; Haaland 18' | | | Stadium: Academy Stadium; Referee: Craig Pawson (England) |

== Competitions ==
=== Overall record ===
| Competition | First match | Last match | Starting round | Final position | Record | | | | | | | |
| Competition | First match | Last match | Starting round | Final position | Pld | W | D | L | GF | GA | GD | Win % |
|---|---|---|---|---|---|---|---|---|---|---|---|---|
| La Liga | 14 August 2022 | 4 June 2023 | Matchday 1 | 10th | 38 | 13 | 10 | 15 | 58 | 55 | +3 | 34.21 |
| Copa del Rey | 13 November 2022 | 22 December 2022 | First round | Second round | 2 | 1 | 0 | 1 | 3 | 3 | +0 | 50.00 |
| Total | | | | | 40 | 14 | 10 | 16 | 61 | 58 | +3 | 35.00 |

Source: Soccerway

=== La Liga ===
==== League table ====
| Pos | Team | Pld | W | D | L | GF | GA | GD | Pts | Qualification or relegation |
|---|---|---|---|---|---|---|---|---|---|---|
| 8 | Athletic Bilbao | 38 | 14 | 9 | 15 | 47 | 43 | +4 | 51 | |
| 9 | Mallorca | 38 | 14 | 8 | 16 | 37 | 43 | −6 | 50 | |
| 10 | Girona | 38 | 13 | 10 | 15 | 58 | 55 | +3 | 49 (Note: Head-to-head points: Girona 8, Rayo Vallecano 6, Sevilla 1.) | |
| 11 | Rayo Vallecano | 38 | 13 | 10 | 15 | 45 | 53 | −8 | 49 | |
| 12 | Sevilla | 38 | 13 | 10 | 15 | 47 | 54 | −7 | 49 | Qualification for the Champions League group stage (Note: Sevilla qualified for the 2023–24 UEFA Champions League by winning the 2022–23 UEFA Europa League.) |

Source: LaLiga Santander
Rules for classification: 1) Points; 2) Head-to-head points; 3) Head-to-head goal difference; 4) Goal difference; 5) Goals scored; 6) Fair-play points (Note: Head-to-head record is used only after all the matches between the teams in question have been played)

==== Results summary ====
| Overall | | | | | | | | Home | | | | | | Away | | | | | |
| Pld | W | D | L | GF | GA | GD | Pts | W | D | L | GF | GA | GD | W | D | L | GF | GA | GD |
|---|---|---|---|---|---|---|---|---|---|---|---|---|---|---|---|---|---|---|---|
| 38 | 13 | 10 | 15 | 58 | 55 | +3 | 49 | 10 | 3 | 6 | 35 | 26 | +9 | 3 | 7 | 9 | 23 | 29 | −6 |

Source: La Liga

==== Results by round ====
| Round | 1 | 2 | 3 | 4 | 5 | 6 | 7 | 8 | 9 | 10 | 11 | 12 | 13 | 14 | 15 | 16 | 17 | 18 | 19 | 20 | 21 | 22 | 23 | 24 | 25 | 26 | 27 | 28 | 29 | 30 | 31 | 32 | 33 | 34 | 35 | 36 | 37 | 38 |
|---|---|---|---|---|---|---|---|---|---|---|---|---|---|---|---|---|---|---|---|---|---|---|---|---|---|---|---|---|---|---|---|---|---|---|---|---|---|---|
| Ground | A | H | H | A | H | A | H | A | H | A | H | A | H | A | H | A | H | A | H | H | A | H | A | A | H | A | H | A | H | A | H | A | H | A | H | A | H | A |
| Result | L | W | L | D | W | L | L | L | D | L | D | D | W | W | D | D | W | L | L | W | L | W | W | L | L | D | W | D | W | L | W | W | W | D | L | D | L | L |
| Position | 17 | 9 | 13 | 12 | 8 | 11 | 13 | 14 | 15 | 18 | 18 | 16 | 14 | 13 | 12 | 12 | 11 | 11 | 12 | 11 | 11 | 11 | 11 | 11 | 12 | 12 | 11 | 11 | 9 | 11 | 10 | 8 | 7 | 7 | 8 | 9 | 9 | 10 |

Source: La Liga
A = Away; H = Home; W = Win; D = Draw; L = Loss

==== Matches ====
The league fixtures were announced on 23 June 2022.

| 14 August 2022 1 | Valencia | 1–0 | Girona | Valencia |
| 19:30 CEST (UTC+2) | Soler 45+1' (pen.); Cömert (red card) 52'; Correia (yellow card) 56'; Vázquez (yellow card) 69' | Report | Couto (yellow card) 14'; Terrats (yellow card) 44'; Valery (yellow card) 45' | Stadium: Mestalla; Attendance: 39,359; Referee: Jorge Figueroa Vázquez |

| 22 August 2022 2 | Girona | 3–1 | Getafe | Girona |
| 22:00 CEST (UTC+2) | Castellanos (yellow card) 33', (goal) 64'; Stuani 42'; Duarte 47' (o.g.); Juanpe (yellow card) 81' | Report | Mitrović (yellow card) 35'; Mayoral (yellow card) 46'; Djené (yellow card) 49'; Angileri (yellow card) 49', (red card) 90+7'; Aleñá (yellow card) 51'; Ünal 73', (yellow card) 90+7' | Stadium: Montilivi; Attendance: 10,460; Referee: Alejandro Muñiz Ruiz |

| 26 August 2022 3 | Girona | 0–1 | Celta Vigo | Girona |
| 20:00 CEST (UTC+2) | López (yellow card) 43'; Juanpe (yellow card) 45' | Report | Aspas 49'; Tapia (yellow card) 68' | Stadium: Montilivi; Attendance: 11,329; Referee: Carlos del Cerro Grande |

| 3 September 2022 4 | Mallorca | 1–1 | Girona | Palma |
| 14:00 CEST (UTC+2) | Battaglia (yellow card) 14'; Muriqi (yellow card) 29'; Sánchez (yellow card) 58'; Raíllo 87'; Copete (yellow card) 90' | Report | Castellanos (yellow card) 23'; Romeu (yellow card) 49'; Sáiz 90+2' (pen.) | Stadium: Visit Mallorca Stadium; Attendance: 13,390; Referee: Isidro Díaz de Mera Escuderos |

| 9 September 2022 5 | Girona | 2–1 | Valladolid | Girona |
| 21:00 CEST (UTC+2) | Reinier 21'; Romeu 88' | Report | Anuar (yellow card) 9'; Monchu 38'; Mesa (yellow card) 79' | Stadium: Montilivi; Attendance: 10,053; Referee: César Soto Grado |

| 18 September 2022 6 | Real Betis | 2–1 | Girona | Seville |
| 18:30 CEST (UTC+2) | Iglesias 15', 71' | Report | Arnau 7'; Espinosa (yellow card) 14'; Gutiérrez (yellow card) 82'; Romeu (yellow card) 87' | Stadium: Benito Villamarín; Attendance: 52,229; Referee: Miguel Ángel Ortiz Arias |

| 2 October 2022 7 | Girona | 3–5 | Real Sociedad | Girona |
| 18:30 CEST (UTC+2) | Riquelme 23'; Arnau 27'; Castellanos 48', (yellow card) 90+4'; Romeu (yellow card) 57'; Gutiérrez (yellow card) 65' | Report | Sørloth 8', 42'; Méndez 66'; Zubimendi 71'; Kubo 85'; Merino (yellow card) 87' | Stadium: Montilivi; Attendance: 12,217; Referee: Mario Melero López |

| 8 October 2022 8 | Atlético Madrid | 2–1 | Girona | Madrid |
| 16:15 CEST (UTC+2) | Correa 5', 48'; Giménez (yellow card) 45+1'; Cunha (yellow card) 49'; Savić (yellow card) 89' | Report | Hernández (yellow card) 55'; Riquelme 66' | Stadium: Cívitas Metropolitano; Attendance: 54,069; Referee: Juan Martínez Munuera |

| 15 October 2022 9 | Girona | 1–1 | Cádiz | Girona |
| CEST (UTC+2) | A. García (yellow card) 45+1'; Bueno (yellow card) 54'; Martínez (yellow card) 68'; Castellanos (yellow card) 69'; Stuani (yellow card) 76', (goal) 90+11' (pen.) | Report | Sobrino (yellow card) 5'; Emeterio (yellow card) 23'; Fernández 46'; Alcaraz (yellow card) 62'; Espino (yellow card) 90+10' | Stadium: Montilivi; Attendance: 9,927; Referee: Ricardo de Burgos Bengoetxea |

| 20 October 2022 10 | Almería | 3–2 | Girona | Almería |
| 19:00 CEST (UTC+2) | Baptistão 13'; Touré 17'; Embarba 38'; Ramazani (yellow card) 84' | Report | Herrera (yellow card) 5'; Bueno (yellow card) 36'; Riquelme 47'; Stuani (penalty missed) 78', 83' (pen.); Espinosa (yellow card) 90+2' | Stadium: Power Horse Stadium; Attendance: 11,194; Referee: Guillermo Cuadra Fernández |

| 23 October 2022 11 | Girona | 1–1 | Osasuna | Girona |
| 18:30 CEST (UTC+2) | López 45+1'; Miguel (yellow card) 88'; Reinier (yellow card) 88' | Report | Barja 37'; Torró (yellow card) 45'; Vidal (yellow card) 70'; Cruz (yellow card) 72' | Stadium: Montilivi; Attendance: 10,032; Referee: Juan Luis Pulido Santana |

| 30 October 2022 12 | Real Madrid | 1–1 | Girona | Madrid |
| 16:15 CEST (UTC+2) | Kroos (yellow card) 55' (yellow-red card) 90+1'; Vinícius 70'; Modrić (yellow card) 75' | Report | López (yellow card) 51'; Gazzaniga (yellow card) 59'; Stuani 80' (pen.); Martínez (yellow card) 90+4' | Stadium: Santiago Bernabéu; Attendance: 58,367; Referee: Mario Melero López |

| 4 November 2022 13 | Girona | 2–1 | Athletic Bilbao | Girona |
| 21:00 CET (UTC+1) | Romeu (yellow card) 52'; López 67'; Martín 75' | Report | Berchiche (yellow card) 35'; Guruzeta 78' | Stadium: Montilivi; Attendance: 11,420; Referee: Valentín Pizarro Gómez |

| 8 November 2022 14 | Elche | 1–2 | Girona | Elche |
| 19:00 CET (UTC+1) | Lirola 16'; Josan (yellow card) 28'; Gumbau (yellow card) 70'; González (yellow card) 88' | Report | Toni (yellow card) 22'; Martín 39'; Castellanos 66'; Stuani (yellow card) 88' | Stadium: Martínez Valero; Attendance: 17,339; Referee: Pablo González Fuertes |

| 29 December 2022 15 | Girona | 2–2 | Rayo Vallecano | Girona |
| 17:00 CET (UTC+1) | Martínez (yellow card) 13'; Castellanos 34' (pen.); Sáiz 75' (pen.); Romeu (yellow card) 77'; Stuani (yellow card) 79' | Report | Camello 2'; Palazón 62', (yellow card) 75'; Falcao (yellow card) 86' | Stadium: Montilivi; Attendance: 11,451; Referee: Jorge Figueroa Vázquez |

| 7 January 2023 16 | Espanyol | 2–2 | Girona | Cornellà de Llobregat |
| 21:00 CET (UTC+1) | Expósito (yellow card) 4'; Oliván (yellow card) 21'; Puado 51'; Joselu 76'; Montes (yellow card) 87' | Report | Castellanos (yellow card) 9'; Toni 32'; Herrera 85', (yellow card) 88' | Stadium: RCDE Stadium; Attendance: 21,429; Referee: Carlos del Cerro Grande |

| 14 January 2023 17 | Girona | 2–1 | Sevilla | Girona |
| 16:15 CET (UTC+1) | López (yellow card) 36'; Toni (yellow card) 45'; Stuani 46'; Martínez (yellow card) 68'; Herrera 88' | Report | Nianzou 13'; Acuña (yellow card) 45' | Stadium: Montilivi; Attendance: 12,035; Referee: Valentín Pizarro Gómez |

| 22 January 2023 18 | Villarreal | 1–0 | Girona | Villarreal |
| 14:00 CET (UTC+1) | Gerard (yellow card) 18', (penalty missed) 90+3'; Pino (yellow card) 25'; Torres (yellow card) 37'; Baena (yellow card) 45+1'; Moreno (yellow card) 90+6'; Parejo 90+11' (pen.) | Report | Bueno (yellow card) 3' (yellow-red card) 78'; Gutiérrez (yellow card) 32'; Stuani (yellow card) 40'; Juanpe (yellow card) 90+9' | Stadium: Estadio de la Cerámica; Attendance: 15,558; Referee: Carlos del Cerro Grande |

| 28 January 2023 19 | Girona | 0–1 | Barcelona | Girona |
| 16:15 CET (UTC+1) | Castellanos (yellow card) 44'; Martínez (yellow card) 74' | Report | Fati (yellow card) 43'; Gavi (yellow card) 49'; Pedri (yellow card) 45+3', (goal) 61' | Stadium: Montilivi; Attendance: 13,231; Referee: Alejandro Muñiz Ruiz |

| 5 February 2023 20 | Girona | 1–0 | Valencia | Girona |
| 16:15 CET (UTC+1) | B. García 63'; Stuani (yellow card) 79' | Report | Guillamón (yellow card) 61'; Gayà (yellow card) 66'; Cavani (yellow card) 66'; Özkacar (yellow card) 90+3' | Stadium: Montilivi; Attendance: 10,732; Referee: Javier Iglesias Villanueva |

| 10 February 2023 21 | Cádiz | 2–0 | Girona | Cádiz |
| 21:00 CET (UTC+1) | Escalante 6', (yellow card) 55'; Hernández (yellow card) 32'; Guardiola 34'; Espino (yellow card) 38'; Lozano (yellow card) 82' | Report | Espinosa (yellow card) 17'; Roca (yellow card) 51'; Gutiérrez (yellow card) 56'; Martínez (yellow card) 70' | Stadium: Nuevo Mirandilla; Attendance: 14,873; Referee: Juan Luis Pulido Santana |

| 17 February 2023 22 | Girona | 6–2 | Almería | Girona |
| 21:00 CET (UTC+1) | Castellanos 8'; Tsyhankov 34'; Riquelme 36'; Hernández 43'; B. García (yellow card) 59'; Martín 77'; Stuani 79' | Report | Ramazani 66'; Touré 81'; Suárez (yellow card) 90' | Stadium: Montilivi; Attendance: 8,879; Referee: Valentín Pizarro Gómez |

| 26 February 2023 23 | Athletic Bilbao | 2–3 | Girona | Bilbao |
| 14:00 CET (UTC+1) | De Marcos (yellow card) 14'; Berchiche 35'; Yeray (yellow card) 45'; R. García (yellow card) 77', (goal) 89'; Muniain (yellow card) 85'; Paredes (yellow card) 90+5' | Report | A. García 4'; Castellanos (yellow card) 16'; De Marcos 19' (o.g.); Bueno (yellow card) 28'; Arnau (yellow card) 36'; Vesga 45+1' (o.g.); Romeu (yellow card) 72'; Gazzaniga (yellow card) 90+4' | Stadium: San Mamés; Attendance: 42,816; Referee: Isidro Díaz de Mera Escuderos |

| 4 March 2023 24 | Getafe | 3–2 | Girona | Getafe |
| 14:00 CET (UTC+1) | Ünal 2', 14'; Mayoral 43'; Algobia (yellow card) 45+1'; Djené (yellow card) 69'; Duarte (yellow card) 72'; Maksimović (yellow card) 90'; Milla (yellow card) 90+2' | Report | Hernández (yellow card) 12'; Riquelme (yellow card) 24'; Castellanos 54'; Gutiérrez 80', (yellow card) 90+5'; Bueno (yellow card) 90' | Stadium: Coliseum Alfonso Pérez; Attendance: 9,802; Referee: Juan Martínez Munuera |

| 12 March 2023 25 | Girona | 0–1 | Atlético Madrid | Girona |
| 21:00 CET (UTC+1) | Stuani (yellow card) 90+11'; Gazzaniga (yellow card) 90+12' | Report | Llorente (yellow card) 57'; Savić (yellow card) 66'; Morata 90+1'; De Paul (yellow card) 90+8' | Stadium: Montilivi; Attendance: 12,499; Referee: Mario Melero López |

| 18 March 2023 26 | Rayo Vallecano | 2–2 | Girona | Madrid |
| 16:15 CET (UTC+1) | Catena (yellow card) 7'; Hernández (yellow card) 18'; Palazón 23'; Trejo 34', (penalty missed) 41' | Report | Tsyhankov 29', 52'; Martínez (yellow card) 37'; López (yellow card) 71' | Stadium: Vallecas; Attendance: 12,163; Referee: Pablo González Fuertes |

| 1 April 2023 27 | Girona | 2–1 | Espanyol | Girona |
| 14:00 CEST (UTC+2) | Romeu (yellow card) 24'; Martín (yellow card) 35'; Martínez 53', (yellow card) 90+3'; Castellanos (yellow card) 71'; Reinier (red card) 71'; Stuani 88' (pen.) | Report | Braithwaite 74'; S. Gómez (red card) 83'; Suárez (yellow card) 83'; Calero (yellow card) 87' | Stadium: Montilivi; Attendance: 12,841; Referee: Miguel Ángel Ortiz Arias |
Note: Reinier was sent off for dissent while a substitute.

| 10 April 2023 28 | Barcelona | 0–0 | Girona | Barcelona |
| 21:00 CEST (UTC+2) | | Report | Castellanos (yellow card) 32'; Stuani (yellow card) 77' | Stadium: Camp Nou; Attendance: 78,425; Referee: Antonio Mateu Lahoz |

| 16 April 2023 29 | Girona | 2–0 | Elche | Girona |
| 14:00 CEST (UTC+2) | Castellanos (yellow card) 17', (goal) 45'; Bueno (yellow card) 42'; Romeu (yellow card) 47', (goal) 70' | Report | Milla (yellow card) 22'; Boyé (yellow card) 57'; Gumbau (yellow card) 73'; Ponce (red card) 90+2' | Stadium: Montilivi; Attendance: 11,114; Referee: Jorge Figueroa Vázquez |

| 22 April 2023 30 | Valladolid | 1–0 | Girona | Valladolid |
| 18:30 CEST (UTC+2) | Monchu 24'; Amallah (yellow card) 68' | Report | Martín (yellow card) 41' | Stadium: José Zorilla; Attendance: 21,033; Referee: Mario Melero López |

| 25 April 2023 31 | Girona | 4–2 | Real Madrid | Girona |
| 19:30 CEST (UTC+2) | Castellanos 12', 24', 46', 62'; Martínez (yellow card) 43' | Report | Vinícius 34', (yellow card) 37'; Militão (yellow card) 65'; Vázquez 85' | Stadium: Montilivi; Attendance: 13,306; Referee: Javier Iglesias Villanueva |

| 1 May 2023 32 | Sevilla | 0–2 | Girona | Seville |
| 21:00 CEST (UTC+2) | Gudelj (yellow card) 4'; Acuña (yellow card) 90+6' | Report | Juanpe 23'; Castellanos 55'; Callens (yellow card) 84' | Stadium: Ramón Sánchez Pizjuán; Referee: Alejandro Muñiz Ruiz |

| 4 May 2023 33 | Girona | 2–1 | Mallorca | Girona |
| 19:30 CEST (UTC+2) | Espinosa (yellow card) 14', (goal) 45+2'; Hernández (yellow card) 76'; Castellanos (yellow card) 77', (goal) 84'; Couto (yellow card) 90+2' | Report | Muriqi 80' (pen.) | Stadium: Montilivi; Attendance: 11,767; Referee: Juan Martínez Munuera |

| 13 May 2023 34 | Real Sociedad | 2–2 | Girona | San Sebastián |
| 14:00 CEST (UTC+2) | Oyarzabal 5', (yellow card) 62'; Zubeldia (yellow card) 11'; Silva 47'; Le Normand (yellow card) 38'; Barrenetxea (yellow card) 78'; Zubimendi 90+5' | Report | Couto 37'; Stuani 45+3'; Romeu (yellow card) 49' (yellow-red card) 87'; Martínez (yellow card) 55' | Stadium: Reale Arena; Attendance: 30,027; Referee: Jorge Figueroa Vázquez |

| 20 May 2023 35 | Girona | 1–2 | Villarreal | Girona |
| 14:00 CEST (UTC+2) | López 24', (yellow card) 55'; Herrera (yellow card) 71' | Report | Pino 9', (yellow card) 23'; Gerard 90+4' | Stadium: Montilivi; Attendance: 11,649; Referee: Valentín Pizarro Gómez |

| 23 May 2023 36 | Celta Vigo | 1–1 | Girona | Vigo |
| 19:30 CEST (UTC+2) | Pérez 42' | Report | Stuani 59' (pen.) | Stadium: Balaídos; Attendance: 14,117; Referee: Antonio Mateu Lahoz |

| 28 May 2023 37 | Girona | 1–2 | Real Betis | Girona |
| 19:00 CEST (UTC+2) | Gutiérrez 36' | Report | Iglesias 47', 77'; Rodríguez (yellow card) 86' | Stadium: Montilivi; Attendance: 12,833; Referee: Isidro Díaz de Mera Escuderos |

| 4 June 2023 38 | Osasuna | 2–1 | Girona | Pamplona |
| 18:30 CEST (UTC+2) | Budimir 52', 55'; Moncayola (yellow card) 73' | Report | Herrera (yellow card) 36'; Espinosa (yellow card) 56'; Reinier 75'; Couto (yellow card) 90+3'; Stuani (yellow card) 90+3'; Gazzaniga (yellow card) 90+6' | Stadium: El Sadar; Attendance: 22,128; Referee: Miguel Ángel Ortiz Arias |

=== Copa del Rey ===
| 13 November 2022 First round | Quintanar del Rey | 1–2 (a.e.t.) | Girona | Quintanar del Rey |
| 12:00 CET (UTC+1) | Seck (yellow card) 68'; Megías 76' (pen.); Minaya (yellow card) 90+3'; Perujo (yellow card) 107' | Report | Riquelme 17'; Miguel (yellow card) 67'; Valery (yellow card) 90+2'; Stuani 97', (penalty missed) 120+2'; Castellanos (yellow card) 105+1'; Espinosa (yellow card) 116' | Stadium: San Marcos; Referee: Carlos del Cerro Grande |

| 22 December 2022 Second round | Cacereño | 2–1 | Girona | Cáceres |
| 19:00 CET (UTC+1) | Grande 17'; El Kounni (yellow card) 23'; Bermúdez (yellow card) 49'; Fernández 61' | Report | Castellanos 30'; Romeu (yellow card) 43' | Stadium: Príncipe Felipe; Attendance: 5,234; Referee: Javier Alberola Rojas |
