= Viktor Tsyhankov =

Ukrainian footballer (born 1997)

Viktor Tsygankov
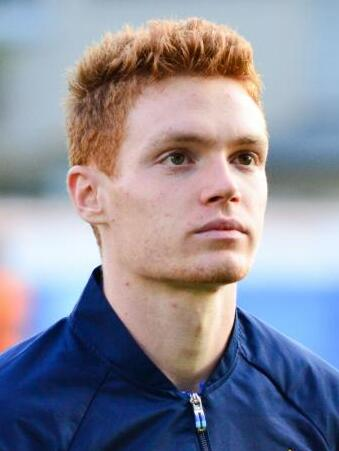
- Tsygankov with Ukraine U21 in 2016

Personal information
- Full name: Viktor Vitaliiovych Tsygankov
- Date of birth: 15 November 1997 (age 28)
- Place of birth: Nahariya, Israel
- Height: 1.78 m (5 ft 10 in)
- Positions: Attacking midfielder; winger

Team information
- Current team: Ajax
- Number: 11

Youth career
- 2009–2010: Nyva Vinnytsia
- 2011–2016: Dynamo Kyiv

Senior career*
Years	Team	Apps	(Gls)
2016–2023	Dynamo Kyiv	156	(77)
2023–2026	Girona	108	(19)
2026–	Ajax	6	(1)

International career^{‡}
2012	Ukraine U16	4	(2)
2012–2014	Ukraine U17	20	(8)
2014–2016	Ukraine U19	10	(1)
2016	Ukraine U21	1	(0)
2016–	Ukraine	71	(14)
- * Club domestic league appearances and goals as of 25 October 2026 ‡ National team caps and goals as of 6 October 2026

Viktor Vitaliiovych Tsyhankov (Note: Sometimes romanized as Tsygankov) (Ukrainian: Ві́ктор Віта́лійович Циганко́в; born 15 November 1997) is a Ukrainian professional footballer who plays as an attacking midfielder or winger for Eredivisie club Ajax and the Ukraine national team.

== Early life ==
Tsyhankov was born in Nahariya, Israel, where his father, Vitalii Tsygankov, played professionally as a goalkeeper for Hapoel Tayibe and Hapoel Acre. After his father retired from active play, the family returned to Ukraine, settling in Vinnytsia.

== Club career ==
=== Youth career ===
Tsyhankov began his youth development at the Nyva Vinnytsia youth academy under coach Mykola Zahoruyko. In 2011, at age 13, he transferred to the Dynamo Kyiv academy, progressing through their youth categories and competing in the Ukrainian Youth Football League (DUFL).

=== Dynamo Kyiv ===
Tsyhankov made his senior competitive debut in the Ukrainian Premier League for Dynamo Kyiv on 14 August 2016, appearing as a substitute against FC Stal Kamianske. Shortly after, on 24 September 2016, he netted his first senior league goal in a 4–0 victory over FC Olimpik Donetsk. On 28 September 2016, he made his debut in the UEFA Champions League group stage, marking the occasion with a crucial goal in a 1–1 draw against Beşiktaş.

Over the subsequent seasons, Tsyhankov established himself as an indispensable creative hub for Dynamo Kyiv. During the 2018–19 campaign, he scored 18 league goals, earned the Ukrainian Premier League Player of the Season award, and collected three Player of the Month accolades (March, December 2018, and April 2019). Under manager Mircea Lucescu, he played a pivotal role in securing the domestic treble during the 2020–21 season, winning the league title, the Ukrainian Cup, and the Ukrainian Super Cup. Across seven seasons with the Kyiv senior team, he amassed 236 appearances, scored 94 goals, and provided 64 assists in all competitions.

=== Girona ===
On 17 January 2023, Tsyhankov moved abroad, signing a contract with La Liga side Girona running until June 2027. The transfer fee was reported as €5 million, with Dynamo Kyiv retaining a 50% sell-on clause. He made his debut on 5 February 2023 against Valencia and quickly adjusted to the Spanish top flight, contributing 3 goals and 6 assists in 19 appearances during his opening half-season.

In the 2023–24 campaign, Tsyhankov became an instrumental figure under coach Míchel, recording 8 goals and 7 assists in 30 league games (starting 26) to help guide Girona to a historic third-place finish and qualification for the UEFA Champions League. During his final season in Spain, he made 31 starts in La Liga, scoring six goals and providing five assists, while leading the squad in chances created (55), final-third passes, and touches inside the opposition penalty area. His 55 chances created ranked third among all right wingers in La Liga, behind only Lamine Yamal and Antony. He completed his three-and-a-half-season tenure with the Catalan club accumulating 119 appearances, 20 goals, and 23 assists across all competitions.

=== Ajax ===
On 27 August 2026, Tsyhankov joined Eredivisie club Ajax on a three-year contract running until 30 June 2029, reuniting with his former Girona manager Míchel. Upon his arrival, he was assigned the squad number 11.

== International career ==
Tsyhankov represented Ukraine across multiple youth international levels, earning caps for the under-16, under-17, under-19, and under-21 national teams.

He received his first senior call-up from manager Andriy Shevchenko in October 2016 for 2018 FIFA World Cup qualifiers against Turkey and Kosovo, remaining an unused substitute. He made his senior international debut on 12 November 2016, coming on as an 83rd-minute substitute in a 1–0 qualifying victory against Finland in Odesa.

Tsyhankov scored his first senior international goal on 25 March 2019 in a 2–1 UEFA Euro 2020 qualifying win against Luxembourg. On 13 October 2020, he scored the winning goal in a 1–0 home victory over Spain in the 2020–21 UEFA Nations League A.

In June 2021, Tsyhankov was named in Ukraine's final 26-man squad for UEFA Euro 2020, appearing in four matches as Ukraine reached the quarter-finals. In May 2024, he was selected by manager Serhiy Rebrov for the UEFA Euro 2024 finals in Germany.

== Style of play ==
Operating primarily as an inverted winger on the right flank, Tsyhankov is known for his technical proficiency, agility, vision, tactical versatility, and dead-ball delivery. As a left-footed wide attacker, he frequently cuts inside into central half-spaces to generate shooting opportunities from distance or execute penetrative through balls for advancing teammates.

In possession-oriented systems, he demonstrates positional flexibility by moving narrow to function as an attacking playmaker or secondary forward, exploiting spaces vacated by overlapping full-backs. During his earlier development at Dynamo Kyiv, he was occasionally utilized on the left wing, whereas at Girona he was also deployed centrally as an attacking midfielder and occasionally as a centre-forward. Statistical analysis from his time in La Liga highlighted his creative metrics, leading his squad in penalty-area touches, final-third passes, and chances created. In addition to his playmaking from open play, he is recognized as an accomplished set-piece specialist, frequently handling direct free kicks and corner deliveries.

== Personal life ==
Tsyhankov married Romana Prokopovych in 2022; the couple have one son.

Tsyhankov has publicly expressed support for Ukraine in the context of the Russian invasion of Ukraine, as well as solidarity with civilians affected by the Gaza war.

== Career statistics ==
=== Club ===
As of match played 25 October 2026

Appearances and goals by club, season and competition
Club	Season	League			National cup (Note: Includes Ukrainian Cup, Copa del Rey, KNVB Cup)		Europe		Other		Total	
Club	Season	Division	Apps	Goals	Apps	Goals	Apps	Goals	Apps	Goals	Apps	Goals
Dynamo Kyiv	2016–17	Ukrainian Premier League	20	3	3	1	6 (Note: Appearances in UEFA Champions League)	1	0	0	29	5
Dynamo Kyiv	2017–18	Ukrainian Premier League	27	13	2	1	10 (Note: One appearance in UEFA Champions League, nine appearances and three goals in UEFA Europa League)	3	1 (Note: Appearance in Ukrainian Super Cup)	0	40	17
Dynamo Kyiv	2018–19	Ukrainian Premier League	31	18	1	0	13 (Note: Four appearances in UEFA Champions League, nine appearances and two goals in UEFA Europa League)	2	1	0	46	20
Dynamo Kyiv	2019–20	Ukrainian Premier League	27	14	4	1	8 (Note: Two appearances in UEFA Champions League, six appearances and two goals in UEFA Europa League)	2	0	0	39	17
Dynamo Kyiv	2020–21	Ukrainian Premier League	20	12	3	1	11 (Note: Seven appearances and two goals in UEFA Champions League, four appearances in UEFA Europa League)	2	0	0	34	15
Dynamo Kyiv	2021–22	Ukrainian Premier League	18	11	0	0	6	0	1	0	25	11
Dynamo Kyiv	2022–23	Ukrainian Premier League	13	6	0	0	10 (Note: Four appearances and one goal in UEFA Champions League, six appearances and two goals in UEFA Europa League)	3	—		23	9
Dynamo Kyiv	Total		156	77	13	4	64	13	3	0	236	94
Girona	2022–23	La Liga	19	3	—		—		—		19	3
Girona	2023–24	La Liga	30	8	4	0	—		—		34	8
Girona	2024–25	La Liga	27	2	0	0	5	0	—		32	2
Girona	2025–26	La Liga	32	6	2	1	—		—		34	7
Girona	Total		108	19	6	1	5	0	0	0	119	20
Ajax	2026–27	Eredivisie	6	1	0	0	2 (Note: Appearances in UEFA Conference League)	0	—		8	1
Career total			270	97	19	5	71	13	3	0	363	115

=== International ===
As of match played 5 October 2026

Appearances and goals by national team and year
National team	Year	Apps	Goals
Ukraine	2016	2	0
Ukraine	2017	1	0
Ukraine	2018	8	0
Ukraine	2019	9	3
Ukraine	2020	5	2
Ukraine	2021	11	1
Ukraine	2022	7	1
Ukraine	2023	7	4
Ukraine	2024	7	2
Ukraine	2025	6	0
Ukraine	2026	8	1
Total		71	14

Scores and results list Ukraine's goal tally first, score column indicates score after each Tsyhankov goal.

List of international goals scored by Viktor Tsyhankov
No.	Date	Venue	Cap	Opponent	Score	Result	Competition
1	25 March 2019	Stade Josy Barthel, Luxembourg City, Luxembourg	13	Luxembourg	1–1	2–1	UEFA Euro 2020 qualification
2	7 June 2019	Arena Lviv, Lviv, Ukraine	14	Serbia	1–0	5–0	UEFA Euro 2020 qualification
3	7 June 2019	Arena Lviv, Lviv, Ukraine	14	Serbia	2–0	5–0	UEFA Euro 2020 qualification
4	7 October 2020	Stade de France, Saint-Denis, France	22	France	1–4	1–7	Friendly
5	13 October 2020	Olimpiyskiy National Sports Complex, Kyiv, Ukraine	24	Spain	1–0	1–0	2020–21 UEFA Nations League A
6	23 May 2021	Metalist Oblast Sports Complex, Kharkiv, Ukraine	26	Bahrain	1–1	1–1	Friendly
7	8 June 2022	Aviva Stadium, Dublin, Ireland	39	Republic of Ireland	1–0	1–0	2022–23 UEFA Nations League B
8	12 June 2023	Weserstadion, Bremen, Germany	45	Germany	2–1	3–3	Friendly
9	12 June 2023	Weserstadion, Bremen, Germany	45	Germany	3–1	3–3	Friendly
10	16 June 2023	Toše Proeski Arena, Skopje, North Macedonia	46	North Macedonia	3–2	3–2	UEFA Euro 2024 qualification
11	19 June 2023	Anton Malatinský Stadium, Trnava, Slovakia	47	Malta	1–0	1–0	UEFA Euro 2024 qualification
12	26 March 2024	Wrocław Stadium, Wrocław, Poland	51	Iceland	1–1	2–1	UEFA Euro 2024 qualification
13	11 June 2024	Zimbru Stadium, Chișinău, Moldova	54	Moldova	2–0	4–0	Friendly
14	7 June 2026	Odense Stadium, Odense, Denmark	67	Denmark	1–2	1–2 (Note: Denmark's friendly match against Ukraine was abandoned after 65 minutes with Denmark leading 2–1, due to Danish midfielder Christian Eriksen collapsing on the pitch.)	Friendly

== Honours ==
Dynamo Kyiv

- Ukrainian Premier League: 2020–21
- Ukrainian Cup: 2019–20, 2020–21
- Ukrainian Super Cup: 2018, 2019, 2020

Individual

- Golden talent of Ukraine: 2016 (under-19), 2017 (under-21), 2018 (under-21)
- Ukrainian Footballer of the Year: 2018
- Ukrainian Premier League Player of the Year: 2018–19
- Ukrainian Premier League Footballer of the Year: 2020
- Ukrainian Premier League Player of the Month: March 2018, December 2018, April 2019
