= Toni Fuidias =

Spanish footballer (born 2001)

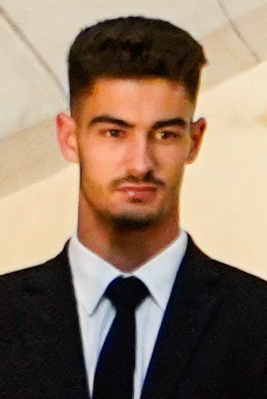
- Fuidias in 2022

Personal information
- Full name: Toni Fuidias Ribera
- Date of birth: 15 April 2001 (age 25)
- Place of birth: Berga, Spain
- Height: 1.95 m (6 ft 5 in)
- Position: Goalkeeper

Team information
- Current team: Rayo Majadahonda

Youth career
- 2008–2010: Berga
- 2010–2013: Manresa
- 2013–2019: Real Madrid

Senior career*
Years	Team	Apps	(Gls)
2019–2022	Real Madrid B	39	(0)
2022–2026	Girona	0	(0)
2024–2025	→ Cartagena (loan)	5	(0)
2025–2026	→ Gimnàstic (loan)	3	(0)
2026–	Rayo Majadahonda	0	(0)
- * Club domestic league appearances and goals as of 1 December 2025

Toni Fuidias Ribera (born 15 April 2001) is a Spanish professional footballer who plays as a goalkeeper for CF Rayo Majadahonda.

== Career ==
Fuidias was born in Berga, Barcelona, Catalonia. After spending the first years of his career at Real Madrid Castilla, he moved to Girona in the summer of 2022. He made his professional debut for the club on 13 November 2022, putting on an impressive display in a 2–1 extra time win over Tercera División club Quintanar del Rey in the Copa del Rey first round.

On 10 July 2024, after being only a third-choice for the Catalans during his two seasons at the club, Fuidias was loaned to Segunda División side FC Cartagena for the season; he also renewed his link with Girona until 2026. On 22 July of the following year, after being rarely used, he further extended his contract until 2027 and moved to Gimnàstic de Tarragona on a one-year loan deal.

On 9 July 2026, Fuidias agreed to a one-year deal with CF Rayo Majadahonda in the third division.

== Career statistics ==
=== Club ===
As of match played 25 May 2025

Appearances and goals by club, season and competition
Club	Season	League			Cup		Other		Total	
Club	Season	Division	Apps	Goals	Apps	Goals	Apps	Goals	Apps	Goals
Real Madrid Castilla	2020–21	Segunda División B	16	0	—		0	0	16	0
Real Madrid Castilla	2021–22	Primera División RFEF	23	0	—		0	0	23	0
Real Madrid Castilla	Total		39	0	0	0	0	0	39	0
Girona	2022–23	La Liga	0	0	1	0	—		1	0
Girona	2023–24	La Liga	0	0	2	0	—		2	0
Girona	Total		0	0	3	0	—		3	0
Cartagena (loan)	2024–25	Segunda División	5	0	0	0	—		5	0
Career total			44	0	3	0	0	0	47	0

== Honours ==
Real Madrid

- La Liga: 2021–22
- Supercopa de España: 2022
- UEFA Champions League: 2021–22
