= Ibrahima Kébé (footballer) =

Malian footballer (born 2000)

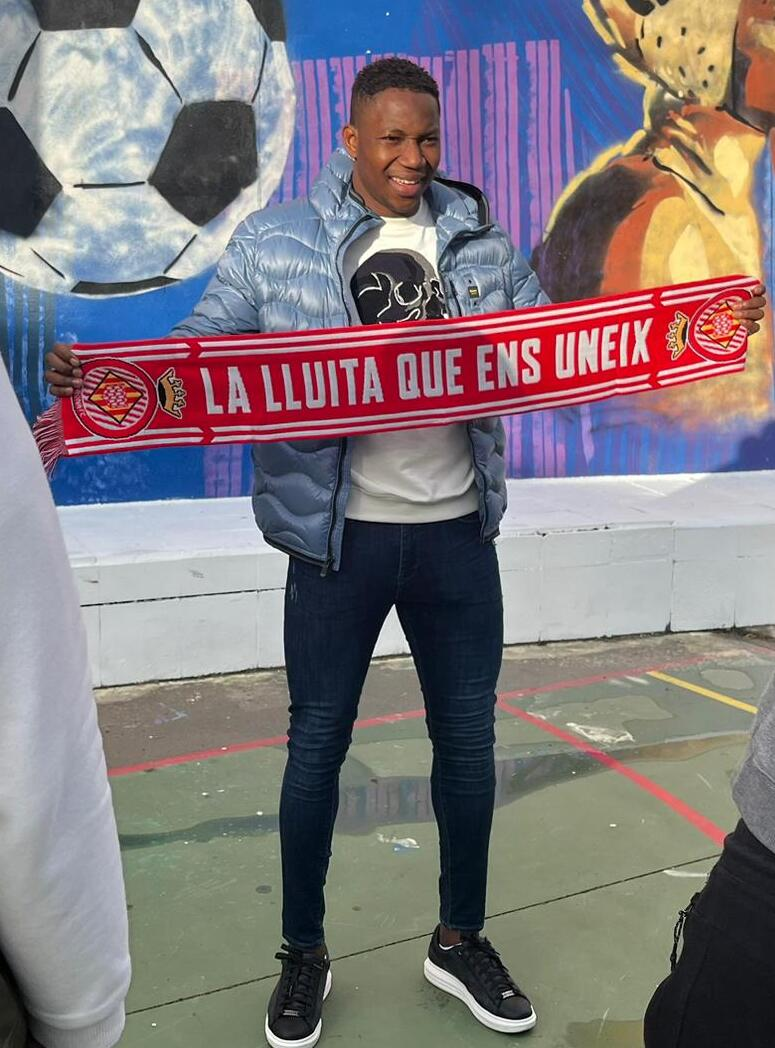

Personal information
- Date of birth: 1 August 2000 (age 26)
- Place of birth: Bamako, Mali
- Height: 1.80 m (5 ft 11 in)
- Position: Midfielder

Team information
- Current team: IMT
- Number: 14

Youth career
- Danaya
- 2019: Girona

Senior career*
Years	Team	Apps	(Gls)
2019–2020	Girona B	8	(0)
2020–2025	Girona	55	(1)
2024	→ Mirandés (loan)	4	(0)
2024–2025	→ Lommel (loan)	23	(1)
2025–2026	Penafiel	19	(1)
2026–	IMT	3	(0)
- * Club domestic league appearances and goals as of 13 September 2026

Ibrahima Kébé (born 1 August 2000) is a Malian professional footballer who plays as a midfielder for Serbian SuperLiga club IMT.

== Club career ==
Kébé joined Girona FC's youth setup in February 2019, from Danaya AC. He made his senior debut with the club's reserves in the regional leagues during the 2019–20 campaign, and was included in the first team's return after the COVID-19 pandemic in May 2020.

Kébé made his professional debut on 13 June 2020, coming on as a second-half substitute for Pape Maly Diamanka in a 0–0 Segunda División away draw against UD Las Palmas. On 31 August of the following year, he renewed his contract until 2024, being definitely promoted to the main squad.

Regularly used during the 2021–22 season as Girona achieved promotion to La Liga, Kébé suffered a knee injury in June 2022, being sidelined for six months. After spending the entire 2022–23 campaign recovering, he made his debut in the category on 7 October 2023, playing the last two minutes in a 1–0 away win over Cádiz CF.

On 27 December 2023, Kébé extended his contract with Girona until June 2026. The following 19 January, he was loaned to CD Mirandés in the second division, until June.

On 24 July 2024, Kébé moved to Belgian club Lommel SK on a one-year loan deal. Upon returning, he terminated his link with Girona on 1 July 2025.

On 25 July 2026, Kébé signed with IMT in Serbia.

== Personal life ==
Kébé's younger brother Moussa is also a footballer and a midfielder. He too played for Girona's B-team.

== Career statistics ==
As of match played 7 January 2024

Appearances and goals by club, season and competition
Club	Season	League			National Cup		Europe		Other		Total	
Club	Season	Division	Apps	Goals	Apps	Goals	Apps	Goals	Apps	Goals	Apps	Goals
Girona	2019–20	Segunda División	2	0	0	0	—		0	0	2	0
Girona	2020–21	Segunda División	25	0	4	0	—		3 (Note: Appearances in La Liga play-offs)	0	32	0
Girona	2021–22	Segunda División	26	1	4	0	—		—		30	1
Girona	2022–23	La Liga	0	0	0	0	—		—		0	0
Girona	2023–24	La Liga	2	0	3	0	—		—		5	0
Girona	Total		55	1	11	0	—		3	0	69	0
Mirandés (loan)	2023–24	Segunda División	0	0	0	0	—		—		0	0
Career total			55	0	11	0	0	0	3	0	69	1
