= Valery Fernández =

Spanish footballer (born 1999)

Valery
Personal information
- Full name: Valery Fernández Estrada
- Date of birth: 23 November 1999 (age 26)
- Place of birth: L'Escala, Spain
- Height: 1.79 m (5 ft 10 in)
- Positions: Right-back; winger

Team information
- Current team: Académico de Viseu
- Number: 17

Youth career
- Palamós
- Girona
- 2011–2014: Barcelona
- 2014–2015: Girona
- 2015–2016: L'Escala
- 2016–2018: Girona

Senior career*
Years	Team	Apps	(Gls)
2015–2016	L'Escala		
2018–2019	Peralada	8	(1)
2018–2025	Girona	117	(5)
2024–2025	→ Mallorca (loan)	18	(2)
2025–2026	Zaragoza	18	(0)
2026–	Académico de Viseu	0	(0)
- * Club domestic league appearances and goals as of 6 September 2026

Valery Fernández Estrada (born 23 November 1999), also simply known as Valery, is a Spanish professional footballer who plays as a right-back or a winger for Primeira Liga club Académico de Viseu.

== Career ==
Born in L'Escala, Girona, Catalonia, Valery joined Barcelona's La Masia in 2011, after representing Girona and Palamós. Released in 2014, he returned to Girona before joining Primera Catalana side L'Escala, where he made his senior debut at the age of just 15.

In 2016, Valery returned to Girona and signed a new three-year contract on 28 June 2018, being also promoted to the reserves in Segunda División B. In his debut for the latter on 26 August, he scored his team's second in a 2–2 away draw against Sabadell.

Valery made his professional debut on 31 October 2018, starting in a 2–2 away draw against Alavés, for the season's Copa del Rey. He also made his La Liga debut on 2 December, coming on as a substitute for Aleix García in a 1–1 draw at Atlético Madrid; the following day, he extended his contract until 2023.

Valery scored his first professional goal on 16 January 2019, netting his team's first in a 3–3 draw against Atleti also at the Wanda Metropolitano. In July, however, he suffered a knee injury in a pre-season friendly against Derby County, being sidelined for most of the 2019–20 season.

On 30 August 2024, Valery was loaned to fellow top tier side Mallorca for the campaign. Upon returning, he terminated his link with Girona on 7 August 2025, and signed a three-year contract with Real Zaragoza in Segunda División the following day.

On 26 August 2026, Valery signed with Académico de Viseu in the Portuguese top tier for one season.

== Career statistics ==
As of match played 19 May 2024

Appearances and goals by club, season and competition
Club	Season	League			Copa del Rey		Other		Total	
Club	Season	Division	Apps	Goals	Apps	Goals	Apps	Goals	Apps	Goals
Peralda	2018–19	Segunda División B	8	1	—		—		8	1
Girona	2018–19	La Liga	17	0	5	1	—		22	1
Girona	2019–20	Segunda División	8	0	0	0	3 (Note: Appearances in Segunda División play-offs)	0	11	0
Girona	2020–21	Segunda División	15	2	3	2	1	0	19	4
Girona	2021–22	Segunda División	25	1	1	0	3	0	29	1
Girona	2022–23	La Liga	25	0	2	0	—		27	0
Girona	2023–24	La Liga	27	2	5	2	—		32	4
Girona	Total		117	5	16	5	7	0	140	10
Career total			125	6	16	5	7	0	148	11
