= Alex Almansa =

Spanish footballer

Personal information
- Full name: Alex Almansa López
- Date of birth: 8 November 2003 (age 22)
- Place of birth: Sant Cugat del Vallès, Spain
- Height: 1.86 m (6 ft 1 in)
- Position: Winger

Team information
- Current team: Gimnàstic

Youth career
- Júnior FC
- 2020–2022: Damm

Senior career*
Years	Team	Apps	(Gls)
2019–2020	Atlètic Junior	4	(0)
2022–2024	Girona B	59	(4)
2024–2026	Espanyol B	47	(6)
2024	Espanyol	0	(0)
2026–	Gimnàstic	0	(0)
- * Club domestic league appearances and goals as of 3 May 2026

Alex Almansa López (born 8 November 2003) is a Spanish professional footballer who plays mainly as a left winger for Gimnàstic de Tarragona.

== Career ==
Born in Sant Cugat del Vallès, Barcelona, Catalonia, Almansa played for hometown side Júnior FC, making his senior debut with affiliate team Atlètic Junior FC in the Segona Catalana in 2019. He moved to CF Damm in 2020, spending two seasons with their Juvenil squad.

In July 2022, Almansa signed for Girona FC and was assigned to the reserves in Tercera Federación. He left the club on 2 July 2024, as his contract expired, and agreed to a two-year contract with RCD Espanyol seventeen days later; he was assigned to the B-team in Segunda Federación.

Almansa made his first team debut with the Pericos on 31 October 2024, coming on as a second-half substitute for Salvi in a 4–0 away routing of San Tirso SD, for the season's Copa del Rey. However, he had limited playing time during the 2025–26 campaign due to injuries, and left the club on 31 May 2026.

On 3 July 2026, Almansa signed a two-year deal with Primera Federación side Gimnàstic de Tarragona.
