= Yangel Herrera =

Venezuelan footballer (born 1998)

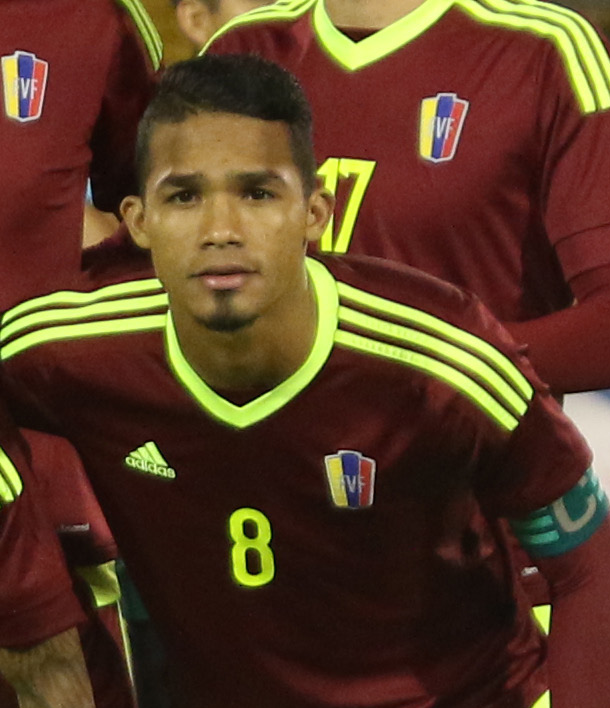
- Herrera with Venezuela U20 in 2017

Personal information
- Full name: Yangel Clemente Herrera Ravelo
- Date of birth: 7 January 1998 (age 28)
- Place of birth: La Guaira, Venezuela
- Height: 1.84 m (6 ft 0 in)
- Position: Midfielder

Team information
- Current team: Real Sociedad
- Number: 21

Youth career
- Monagas

Senior career*
Years	Team	Apps	(Gls)
2016–2017	Atlético Venezuela	32	(3)
2017–2023	Manchester City	0	(0)
2017–2018	→ New York City (loan)	38	(1)
2019	→ Huesca (loan)	16	(0)
2019–2021	→ Granada (loan)	62	(5)
2021–2022	→ Espanyol (loan)	23	(1)
2022–2023	→ Girona (loan)	20	(2)
2023–2025	Girona	60	(9)
2025–	Real Sociedad	19	(1)

International career^{‡}
2015	Venezuela U17	4	(2)
2017–2018	Venezuela U20	15	(3)
2016–	Venezuela	47	(3)
Medal record
Men's football
Representing Venezuela
FIFA U-20 World Cup
Runner-up	2017
South American U-20 Championship
Third place	2017
- * Club domestic league appearances and goals as of 25 October 2026 (UTC) ‡ National team caps and goals as of 22:05, 2 October 2026 (UTC)

Yangel Clemente Herrera Ravelo (born 7 January 1998) is a Venezuelan professional footballer who plays as a midfielder for La Liga club Real Sociedad and the Venezuela national team.

== Club career ==
Herrera started his club career at Monagas SC before moving to Atlético Venezuela in 2016.

=== Manchester City ===
==== Loan to New York City ====
On 31 January 2017 it was confirmed that Herrera had signed for Manchester City. Herrera was immediately sent to New York City on a two-year loan. He made his debut on 12 March, as a substitute in a 4–0 win over D.C. United.

==== Loan to Huesca ====
Following the conclusion of his two-year stay at New York City, Herrera was loaned to La Liga side Huesca for the last six months of the 2018–19 season.

==== Loan to Granada ====
On 26 July 2019, Herrera was loaned to Granada for the 2019–20 season. On 30 August 2020, his loan was extended for the 2020–21 season.

==== Loan to Espanyol ====
On 31 August 2021, Herrera moved to fellow La Liga side Espanyol on a one-year loan deal.

=== Girona ===
On 2 August 2022, Herrera joined newly promoted side Girona, on a season-long loan. He made his debut for the club on the first matchday of the 2022–23 season in a 1–0 away loss to Valencia. On 7 January 2023, he scored his first goal for Girona, securing a late 2–2 equalizer against his former club Espanyol.

On 14 July 2023, Herrera signed a permanent four-year contract with Girona.

=== Real Sociedad ===
On 1 September 2025, Herrera moved to Real Sociedad also in the Spanish top tier on a five-year deal.

== International career ==
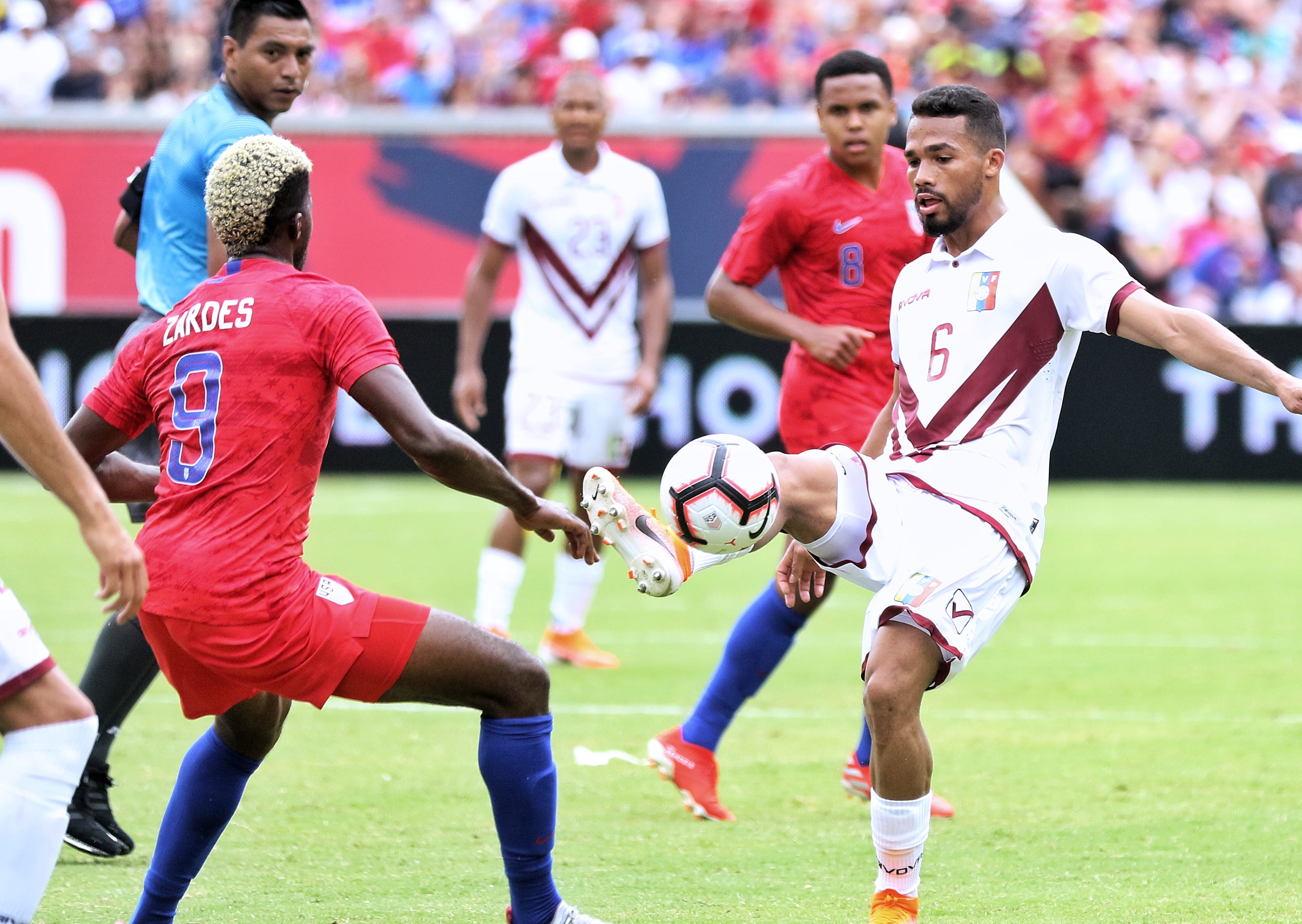
Herrera in action with Venezuela against the United States on 9 June 2019

Herrera made his international debut for the Venezuela national team on 10 October 2016, coming on as a substitute in a 2–0 loss to Brazil.

Herrera was named captain of the Venezuela U20 team for the 2017 U-20 World Cup. He scored the only goal, in the 108th minute of their Round of 16 win over Japan.

== Career statistics ==
=== Club ===
As of match played 25 October 2026

Appearances and goals by club, season and competition
Club	Season	League			National cup (Note: Includes Copa Venezuela, Copa del Rey)		Continental		Other		Total	
Club	Season	Division	Apps	Goals	Apps	Goals	Apps	Goals	Apps	Goals	Apps	Goals
Monagas	2014–15	Liga FUTVE 2	19	4	4	0	—		—		23	4
Monagas	2015	Liga FUTVE 2	16	5	2	0	—		—		18	5
Monagas	Total		35	9	6	0	—		—		41	9
Atlético Venezuela	2016	Liga FUTVE	32	3	1	0	—		—		33	3
New York City (loan)	2017	MLS	20	1	0	0	—		—		20	1
New York City (loan)	2018	MLS	18	0	0	0	—		—		18	0
New York City (loan)	Total		38	1	0	0	—		—		38	1
Huesca (loan)	2018–19	La Liga	16	0	0	0	—		—		16	0
Granada (loan)	2019–20	La Liga	30	2	6	0	—		—		36	2
Granada (loan)	2020–21	La Liga	32	3	2	0	8 (Note: Appearances in UEFA Europa League)	5	—		42	8
Granada (loan)	Total		62	5	8	0	8	5	—		78	10
Espanyol (loan)	2021–22	La Liga	23	1	0	0	—		—		23	1
Girona (loan)	2022–23	La Liga	20	2	0	0	—		—		20	2
Girona	2023–24	La Liga	29	5	2	0	—		—		31	5
Girona	2024–25	La Liga	29	4	0	0	4 (Note: Appearances in UEFA Champions League)	0	—		33	4
Girona	2025–26	La Liga	3	0	0	0	—		—		3	0
Girona	Total		61	9	2	0	4	0	0	0	67	9
Real Sociedad	2025–26	La Liga	10	0	2	0	—		—		12	0
Real Sociedad	2026–27	La Liga	9	1	0	0	2	0	0	0	11	1
Real Sociedad	Total		19	1	2	0	2	0	0	0	23	1
Career total			306	31	19	0	14	5	0	0	339	36

=== International ===
As of match played 2 October 2026

Appearances and goals by national team and year
National team	Year	Apps	Goals
Venezuela	2016	1	0
Venezuela	2017	5	1
Venezuela	2018	2	0
Venezuela	2019	10	1
Venezuela	2020	3	0
Venezuela	2021	1	0
Venezuela	2022	3	0
Venezuela	2023	8	1
Venezuela	2024	7	0
Venezuela	2025	3	0
Venezuela	2026	4	0
Total		47	3

Scores and results list Venezuela's goal tally first, score column indicates score after each Herrera goal.

List of international goals scored by Yangel Herrera
No.	Date	Venue	Opponent	Score	Result	Competition
1	10 October 2017	Estadio Defensores del Chaco, Asunción, Paraguay	Paraguay	1–0	1–0	2018 FIFA World Cup qualification
2	10 October 2019	Estadio Olímpico, Caracas, Venezuela	Bolivia	1–0	4–1	Friendly
3	19 June 2023	Pratt & Whitney Stadium at Rentschler Field, East Hartford, United States	Guatemala	1–0	1–0	Friendly

== Honours ==
Monagas

- Liga FUTVE 2: 2015

Real Sociedad

- Copa del Rey: 2025–26

Venezuela U20

- FIFA U-20 World Cup runner-up: 2017
- South American Youth Football Championship third place: 2017

Venezuela

- Kirin Cup: 2019

Individual

- FIFA U-20 World Cup Bronze Ball: 2017
