= Jandro (footballer, born 2001) =

Spanish footballer

Personal information
- Full name: Alejandro Ariel Sánchez Gallardo
- Date of birth: 21 March 2001 (age 25)
- Place of birth: Tordera, Spain
- Position: Midfielder

Team information
- Current team: Villarrubia

Senior career*
Years	Team	Apps	(Gls)
2020–2021	Girona B	6	(0)
2020–2021	Girona	1	(0)
2021	→ Horta (loan)	14	(4)
2021–2022	Granollers	22	(2)
2022–2023	Vilassar de Mar	29	(3)
2023–2024	Peralada	34	(4)
2024–2025	Grama	34	(10)
2025–	Villarrubia	8	(3)
- * Club domestic league appearances and goals as of 8 November 2025

Alejandro Ariel Sánchez Gallardo (born 21 March 2001), commonly known as Jandro, is a Spanish footballer who plays as a midfielder for Tercera Federación club Villarrubia.

== Club career ==
Born in Tordera, Barcelona, Catalonia, Jandro represented CF Tordera and Girona FC as a youth, and was promoted to the reserves in Tercera División ahead of the 2020–21 campaign. He made his senior debut on 18 October 2020, coming on as a late substitute in a 3–0 away win against UE Figueres.

Jandro made his first team debut on 4 November 2020, replacing goalscorer Mamadou Sylla late into a 2–2 Segunda División away draw against Real Zaragoza. On 1 February 2021, he was loaned to UA Horta for the remainder of the 2020-21 season.
