= 2021–22 Girona FC season =

Girona
2021–22 season
- President: Delfí Geli
- Head coach: Míchel
- Stadium: Estadi Montilivi
- Segunda División: 6th (promoted via play-offs)
- Play-offs: Winners
- Copa del Rey: Round of 16
- Top goalscorer: League: Cristhian Stuani (22); All: Cristhian Stuani (24)
Home colours	Away colours

The 2021–22 season was the 92nd season in the existence of Girona FC and the club's third consecutive season in the second division of Spanish football. In addition to the domestic league, Girona participated in this season's edition of the Copa del Rey.

Girona finished in 6th place to earn a play-off spot. Despite failing to win the first leg at home against either Eibar or Tenerife, they won the second leg on the road in both ties to return to La Liga after three years.

== Players ==
=== First-team squad ===
As of 1 February 2022.

Note: Flags indicate national team as defined under FIFA eligibility rules; some limited exceptions apply. Players may hold more than one non-FIFA nationality.

No.	Pos.	Nation	Player
1	GK	ESP	Juan Carlos
2	DF	COL	Bernardo Espinosa
3	MF	ESP	Jairo Izquierdo
4	MF	ESP	Víctor Sánchez
6	MF	MLI	Ibrahima Kebe
7	FW	URU	Cristhian Stuani (captain)
8	MF	ESP	Álex Baena (on loan from Villarreal)
9	FW	ARG	Darío Sarmiento (on loan from Manchester City)
10	MF	ESP	Samuel Sáiz
11	MF	ESP	Valery Fernández
12	MF	ESP	Iván Martín (on loan from Villarreal)

No.	Pos.	Nation	Player
13	GK	ESP	Adrián Ortolá
14	MF	ESP	Aleix García
15	DF	ESP	Juanpe (vice-captain)
16	FW	ESP	Pablo Moreno (on loan from Manchester City)
17	DF	ESP	David Juncà
19	FW	ARG	Nahuel Bustos (on loan from Manchester City)
20	MF	ESP	Pol Lozano (on loan from Espanyol)
21	MF	ESP	Ramon Terrats
22	DF	URU	Santiago Bueno
24	MF	ESP	Borja García
38	DF	ESP	Arnau Martínez

=== Reserve team ===
Note: Flags indicate national team as defined under FIFA eligibility rules; some limited exceptions apply. Players may hold more than one non-FIFA nationality.

No.	Pos.	Nation	Player
27	FW	ESP	Gabri Martínez
29	FW	ESP	Arnau Ortiz
30	GK	ESP	Jona Morilla
31	DF	ESP	Eric Monjonell
32	FW	ESP	Oscar Ureña
33	DF	ESP	Loïc Williams
34	MF	ESP	Álex Sala

No.	Pos.	Nation	Player
36	MF	ESP	Ricard Artero
40	FW	ESP	Álex Castro
41	DF	ESP	Biel Farrés
42	FW	ESP	Dawda Camara
43	FW	ESP	Suleiman Camara
44	MF	ESP	Joel Roca
45	MF	ESP	Unai Hernández

=== Out on loan ===
Note: Flags indicate national team as defined under FIFA eligibility rules; some limited exceptions apply. Players may hold more than one non-FIFA nationality.

No.	Pos.	Nation	Player
—	DF	ESP	Jordi Calavera (at Sporting Gijón until 30 June 2022)
—	MF	BEL	Jonathan Dubasin (at Logroñés until 30 June 2022)

No.	Pos.	Nation	Player
—	MF	ESP	Álex Gallar (at Cartagena until 30 June 2022)

== Pre-season and friendlies ==
Win Draw Loss

24 July 2021 Friendly	Barcelona	3–1	Girona	Barcelona, Spain
19:00 CEST (UTC+2)	Piqué 21' (pen.); Manaj 24'; Depay 85' (pen.)	Report	Sáiz 42' (pen.)	Stadium: Johan Cruyff Stadium; Attendance: 2,858; Referee: Miguel Ángel Ortiz Arias

7 August 2021 Friendly	Gimnàstic	2–1	Girona	Tarragona, Spain
20:00 CEST (UTC+2)				Stadium: Nou Estadi de Tarragona

8 August 2021 Friendly	Girona	2–0	Barcelona B	Girona, Spain
19:00 CEST (UTC+2)	Sylla 19' (pen.); Gabri 82'			Stadium: La Vinya in Caldes de Malavella Training Centre

== Competitions ==
=== Overall record ===
Competition	First match	Last match	Starting round	Final position	Record							
Competition	First match	Last match	Starting round	Final position	Pld	W	D	L	GF	GA	GD	Win %
Segunda División	14 August 2021	29 May 2022	Matchday 1	6th	42	20	8	14	57	42	+15	47.62
Segunda División promotion play-offs	2 June 2022	19 June 2022	Semi-finals	Winners	4	2	1	1	5	2	+3	50.00
Copa del Rey	2 December 2021	15 January 2022	First round	Round of 16	4	3	0	1	8	3	+5	75.00
Total					50	25	9	16	70	47	+23	50.00

Source: Soccerway

=== Segunda División ===
==== League table ====
Pos	Team	Pld	W	D	L	GF	GA	GD	Pts	Qualification or relegation
4	Las Palmas	42	19	13	10	57	47	+10	70	Qualification for promotion play-offs
5	Tenerife	42	20	9	13	53	37	+16	69	Qualification for promotion play-offs
6	Girona (O, P)	42	20	8	14	57	42	+15	68 (Note: Girona finished ahead of Oviedo on head-to-head points: Girona 2–1 Oviedo, Oviedo 0–0 Girona.)	Qualification for promotion play-offs
7	Oviedo	42	17	17	8	57	41	+16	68	
8	Ponferradina	42	17	12	13	57	55	+2	63	

Source: LaLiga SmartBank
Rules for classification: 1) points; 2) head-to-head points; 3) head-to-head goal difference; 4) goal difference; 5) number of goals scored
(O) Play-off winners; (P) Promoted

==== Results summary ====
Overall								Home						Away					
Pld	W	D	L	GF	GA	GD	Pts	W	D	L	GF	GA	GD	W	D	L	GF	GA	GD
42	20	8	14	57	42	+15	68	13	3	5	36	16	+20	7	5	9	21	26	−5

Source: La Liga SmartBank

==== Results by round ====
Round	1	2	3	4	5	6	7	8	9	10	11	12	13	14	15	16	17	18	19	20	21	22	23	24	25	26	27	28	29	30	31	32	33	34	35	36	37	38	39	40	41	42
Ground	H	H	A	H	A	H	A																																			
Result	W	D	L	L	L	W																																				
Position	10	14	8	13	13	13	11	6	6	5	6	4	4	3	4	5	6	6	6	6	7	7	7	8	9	7	7	8	9	11	14	9	8	8	7	7	8	8	8	7	6	4

Source: La Liga SmartBank
A = Away; H = Home; W = Win; D = Draw; L = Loss

==== Matches ====
The league fixtures were announced on 30 June 2021.

14 August 2021 1	Girona	2–0	Amorebieta	Girona
19:30 CEST (UTC+2)	Stuani 49'; Bustos 86'	Report		Stadium: Montilivi; Referee: David Gálvez Rascón

22 August 2021 2	Girona	0–0	Las Palmas	Girona
19:30 CEST (UTC+2)		Report		Stadium: Montilivi; Attendance: 2,163; Referee: Luis Mario Milla Alvendiz

28 August 2021 3	Ponferradina	2–1	Girona	Ponferrada
22:00 CEST (UTC+2)	Yuri 3'; Ojeda 85'	Report	Bustos 83'	Stadium: El Toralín; Attendance: 3,397; Referee: Juan Luis Pulido Santana

3 September 2021 4	Girona	1–2	Sporting Gijón	Girona
21:00 CEST (UTC+2)	Lozano 86'	Report	Campos 15'; Valiente 58'	Stadium: Montilivi; Referee: Daniel Jesús Trujillo Suárez

12 September 2021 5	Málaga	2–0	Girona	Málaga
21:30 CEST (UTC+2)	Paulino 41', 90+4'	Report		Stadium: La Rosaleda; Referee: José Antonio López Toca

18 September 2021 6	Girona	1–0	Valladolid	Girona
20:30 CEST (UTC+2)	Stuani 60' (pen.)			Stadium: Montilivi; Referee: Jon Ander González Esteban

26 September 2021 7	Oviedo	0–0	Girona	Oviedo
18:15 CEST (UTC+2)				Stadium: Carlos Tartiere; Referee: David Gálvez Rascón

4 October 2021 8	Girona	1–2	Almería	Girona
21:00 CEST (UTC+2)	Espinosa (yellow card) 40' (goal) 62'; Álex Baena (yellow card) 76'	Report	Sadiq (yellow card) 34' (goal) 52'; Robertone 68' (yellow card) 87'; Álex Centelles (yellow card) 71'	Stadium: Estadi Montilivi; Attendance: 4,904; Referee: Juan Luis Pulido Santana

9 October 2021 9	Lugo	1–0	Girona	Lugo
CEST (UTC+2)				Stadium: Anxo Carro

16 October 2021 10	Girona	1–3	Huesca	Girona
--:-- CEST (UTC+2)				Stadium: Estadi Montilivi

21 October 2021 11	Mirandés	1–2	Girona	Miranda de Ebro
CEST (UTC+2)				Stadium: Anduva

25 October 2021 12	Girona	1–1	Zaragoza	Girona
--:-- CEST (UTC+2)				Stadium: Estadi Montilivi

31 October 2021 13	Fuenlabrada	1–2	Girona	Fuenlabrada
CET (UTC+1)				Stadium: Fernando Torres

4 November 2021 14	Girona	3–1	Alcorcón	Girona
--:-- CET (UTC+1)				Stadium: Estadi Montilivi

8 November 2021 15	Tenerife	2–1	Girona	Santa Cruz de Tenerife
CET (UTC+1)				Stadium: Heliodoro Rodríguez López

14 November 2021 16	Girona	2–0	Cartagena	Girona
--:-- CET (UTC+1)				Stadium: Estadi Montilivi

22 November 2021 17	Real Sociedad B	1–2	Girona	San Sebastián
19:00 CET (UTC+2)	Olasagasti (yellow card) 55'; López 83' (pen.)	Report	Ayesa 19' (o.g.); Baena (yellow card) 60'; Bueno (yellow card) 66'; García (yellow card) 68'; Bernardo 75'; Juanpe (yellow card) 82'	Stadium: Anoeta; Attendance: 1,898; Referee: Francisco Hernández

29 November 2021 18	Eibar	4–2	Girona	Eibar
21:00 CET (UTC+1)	Javi Muñoz 16'; Etxeita (yellow card) 18'; Edu Expósito (yellow card) 25'; Fran Sol (yellow card) 36'; Stoichkov 40'; Sergio Álvarez 52'; Álvaro Tejero 84'	Report	Stuani 20' (pen.); Kebe (yellow card) 64'; David Juncà (red card) 73'; Bustos 78'	Stadium: Ipurua; Attendance: 3,200; Referee: Iván Caparrós Hernández

6 December 2021 19	Girona	3–0	Leganés	Girona
--:-- CET (UTC+1)				Stadium: Estadi Montilivi

11 December 2021 20	Ibiza	1–1	Girona	Ibiza
CET (UTC+1)				Stadium: Can Misses

17 December 2021 21	Girona	3–1	Burgos	Girona
--:-- CET (UTC+1)				Stadium: Estadi Montilivi

2 January 2022 22	Huesca	0–1	Girona	Huesca
CET (UTC+1)				Stadium: El Alcoraz

9 January 2022 23	Girona	2–1	Fuenlabrada	Girona
--:-- CET (UTC+1)				Stadium: Estadi Montilivi

23 January 2022 24	Girona	1–1	Lugo	Girona
--:-- CET (UTC+1)				Stadium: Estadi Montilivi

29 January 2022 25	Amorebieta	1–0	Girona	Lezama
CET (UTC+1)				Stadium: Instalaciones de Lezama Campo 2

5 February 2022 26	Girona	3–0	Ponferradina	Girona
--:-- CET (UTC+1)				Stadium: Estadi Montilivi

12 February 2022 27	Valladolid	2–2	Girona	Valladolid
CET (UTC+1)				Stadium: José Zorrilla

19 February 2022 28	Girona	0–1	Eibar	Girona
18:15 CEST (UTC+2)	Juanpe (yellow card) 41'; Espinosa (yellow card) 74'	Report	Toño (yellow card) 30'; Stoichkov 42'; José Corpas (yellow card) 54'; Arbilla (yellow card) 89'; Etxeita (yellow card) 90+4' (yellow-red card) 90+4'	Stadium: Estadi Montilivi; Attendance: 6,511; Referee: Oliver De La Fuente

27 February 2022 29	Leganés	1–1	Girona	Leganés
CET (UTC+1)				Stadium: Butarque

6 March 2022 30	Girona	2–1	Oviedo	Girona
--:-- CET (UTC+1)				Stadium: Estadi Montilivi

12 March 2022 31	Las Palmas	1–3	Girona	Las Palmas
18:15 CET (UTC+1)	Jesé 12' (pen.); Rafa Mújica (yellow card) 21' (yellow-red card) 37'; Álvaro Lemos (yellow card) 44'; Maikel Mesa (yellow card) 68'; Fabio González (yellow card) 71'; Raúl Navas (red card) 77'; Peñaranda (yellow card) 81'; Rober (yellow card) 84'; Saúl Coco (yellow card) 90+6'	Report	Aleix García (yellow card) 12'; Samuel Sáiz (yellow card) 28'; Bustos 62' 65'; Álex Baena (yellow card) 83'; Valery 90+3'	Stadium: Estadio Gran Canaria; Attendance: 12,591; Referee: (Spain) Dámaso Arcediano Monescillo

19 March 2022 32	Girona	5–1	Ibiza	Girona
--:-- CET (UTC+1)				Stadium: Estadi Montilivi

27 March 2022 33	Almería	0–1	Girona	Almería
21:00 CET (UTC+1)	Rodrigo Ely (yellow card) 45+1'; Alejandro Pozo (yellow card) 51'	Report	Borja García 13' (red card) 90+1'; Pol Lozano (yellow card) 19'; Bueno (yellow card) 49'; Víctor Sánchez (yellow card) 78'; Juan Carlos (yellow card) 80'; Aleix García (yellow card) 83'; Ramon Terrats (yellow card) 89'	Stadium: Estadio de los Juegos Mediterráneos; Attendance: 9,260; Referee: Gorka Sagués Oscoz

1 April 2022 34	Girona	1–0	Málaga	Girona
--:-- CEST (UTC+2)				Stadium: Estadi Montilivi

10 April 2022 35	Zaragoza	1–0	Girona	Zaragoza
16:00 CEST (UTC+2)	Sainz 33'			Stadium: La Romareda; Referee: Javier Iglesias Villanueva

18 April 2022 36	Girona	2–0	Real Sociedad B	Girona
19:00 CEST (UTC+2)	Stuani 63'; Bustos 84'	Report	Clemente (yellow card) 38'; Sola (yellow card) 53'; Gómez (yellow card) 77'	Stadium: Estadi Montilivi; Attendance: 7,432; Referee: Oliver De La Fuente

23 April 2022 37	Cartagena	3–0	Girona	Cartagena
16:15 CEST (UTC+2)	Vázquez 11'; Castro 14'; De Blasis 63'			Stadium: Estadio Cartagonova; Referee: Luis Mario Milla Alvendiz

1 May 2022 38	Alcorcón	0–1	Girona	Alcorcón
16:00 CEST (UTC+2)			Stuani 40'	Stadium: Santo Domingo; Referee: Aitor Gorostegui Fernández-Ortega

9 May 2022 39	Girona	0–1	Tenerife	Girona
21:00 CEST (UTC+2)			González 40'	Stadium: Montilivi; Referee: Jon Ander González Esteban

15 May 2022 40	Sporting Gijón	2–1	Girona	Gijón
16:00 CEST (UTC+2)	Gragera 12'; Đurđević 44'		Stuani 22'	Stadium: El Molinón; Referee: Juan Luis Pulido Santana

21 May 2022 41	Girona	2–0	Mirandés	Girona
22:00 CEST (UTC+2)	Stuani 38', 89'			Stadium: Montilivi; Referee: Gorka Sagués Oscoz

29 May 2022 42	Burgos	0–0	Girona	Burgos
20:00 CEST (UTC+2)				Stadium: Estadio El Plantío; Referee: Daniel Jesús Trujillo Suárez

==== Promotion play-offs ====
2 June 2022 Semi-finals; First leg	Girona	0–1	Eibar	Girona
19:00 CEST (UTC+2)		Report	Aketxe 28'	Stadium: Estadi Montilivi; Attendance: 9,450; Referee: Luis Mario Milla Alvéndiz

5 June 2022 Semi-finals; Second leg	Eibar	0–2 (a.e.t.) (1–2 agg.)	Girona	Eibar
18:30 CEST (UTC+2)		Report	García 1'; Stuani 91'	Stadium: Estadio Municipal de Ipurua; Attendance: 6,846; Referee: Juan Luis Pulido Santana

12 June 2022 Finals; First leg	Girona	0–0	Tenerife	Girona
21:00 CEST (UTC+2)		Report		Stadium: Montilivi; Attendance: 11,303; Referee: Francisco José Hernández Maeso

19 June 2022 Finals; Second leg	Tenerife	1–3 (1–3 agg.)	Girona	Santa Cruz de Tenerife
20:00 WEST (UTC+1)				Stadium: Heliodoro Rodríguez López; Referee: Dámaso Arcediano Monescillo

=== Copa del Rey ===
2 December 2021 Round 1	Calvo Sotelo	1–5	Girona	Puertollano
20:00 CET	Abraham Arcos 24'; Diego Dominguez (yellow card) 88'; George Lucas (yellow card) 90+1'	Report	Camara (yellow card) 12' (goal) 61'; Samuel Sáiz 19' (pen.); Eric Monjonell 34'; Pol Lozano (yellow card) 39'; Ricard Artero 50'; Aleix García 67'; Bueno (yellow card) 84'	Stadium: Estadio Ciudad de Puertollano; Attendance: 1,500; Referee: (Spain) Luis Milla Alvendiz

14 December 2021 Round 2	Huesca	0–1	Girona	Huesca
20:00 CET	Roberto Barba (yellow card) 45+1'; Mikel Rico (yellow card) 75'	Report	Jordi Calavera 22'; Álex Baena (yellow card) 72'; Suleiman Camara (yellow card) 88'	Stadium: Estadio El Alcoraz; Attendance: 7,638; Referee: (Spain) Iosu Galech Apezteguía

6 January 2022 Round of 32	Girona	1–0	Osasuna	Girona
16:00 CET	Juncà 6'	Report	Unai García (yellow card) 79'; Moncayola (yellow card) 83'	Stadium: Estadi Montilivi; Attendance: 11,056; Referee: (Spain) Javier Alberola Rojas

15 January 2022 Round of 16	Girona	1–2	Rayo Vallecano	Girona
18:30 CET	Juanpe (yellow card) 18'; Espinosa 26'; Pol Lozano (yellow card) 45+1'; Arnau Martínez (yellow card) 79'; Pablo Moreno (yellow card) 90+7'; Gabri Martínez (red card) 90+8'	Report	Catena (yellow card) 26'; Mario Suárez (yellow card) 26'; Sergi Guardiola 45+1' 48'; Óscar Valentín (yellow card) 69'; Isi Palazón (yellow card) 90+4'; Santi Comesaña (yellow card) 90+6'; Trejo (yellow card) 90+7'	Stadium: Estadi Montilivi; Attendance: 11,056; Referee: (Spain) Adrián Cordero Vega

== Statistics ==
=== Goalscorers ===
As of 29 May 2022

Rank	Pos.	No.	Player	Segunda División	Promotion play-offs	Copa del Rey	Total
1	FW	7	(Uruguay) Cristhian Stuani	22	0	0	22
2	FW	19	(Argentina) Nahuel Bustos	11	0	0	11
3	MF	6	(Spain) Álex Baena	5	0	0	5
4	MF	10	(Spain) Samuel Sáiz	3	0	1	4
Total				57	0	8	65
