= 2022 Segunda División play-offs =

Football competition

Segunda División play-offs
- Season: 2021–22
- Promoted: Girona
- Matches: 6
- Goals: 11 (1.83 per match)

The 2021–22 Segunda División play-offs were played from 1 June to 19 June 2022 and determined the third team promoted to La Liga for the following season. Teams placed between 3rd and 6th position took part in the promotion play-offs.

== Regulations ==
The regulations were the same as the previous season: in the semi-finals, the fifth-placed team faced the fourth-placed team, while the sixth-placed team faced the third. Each tie was played over two legs, with the team lower in the table hosting the first leg.

The team that scored more goals on aggregate over the two legs advanced to the next round. If the aggregate score was level, the away goals rule was applied (i.e., the team that scored more goals away from home over the two legs advanced). If away goals were also equal, then thirty minutes of extra time would be played. The away goals rule would again be applied after extra time (i.e., if there were goals scored during extra time and the aggregate score was still level, the visiting team advanced by virtue of more away goals scored). If no goals were scored during extra time, the winner would be the best positioned team in the regular season.

== Road to the play-offs ==
Pos	Team	Pld	W	D	L	GF	GA	GD	Pts	Qualification or relegation
3	Eibar	42	23	11	8	61	45	+16	80	Qualification for promotion play-offs
4	Las Palmas	42	19	13	10	57	47	+10	70	Qualification for promotion play-offs
5	Tenerife	42	20	9	13	53	37	+16	69	Qualification for promotion play-offs
6	Girona (O, P)	42	20	8	14	57	42	+15	68 (Note: Girona finished ahead of Oviedo on head-to-head points: Girona 2–1 Oviedo, Oviedo 0–0 Girona.)	Qualification for promotion play-offs

Source: LaLiga SmartBank
Rules for classification: 1) points; 2) head-to-head points; 3) head-to-head goal difference; 4) goal difference; 5) number of goals scored
(O) Play-off winners; (P) Promoted

== Bracket ==
Semi–finals
3	Eibar	1	0	1
6	Girona (a.e.t.)	0	2	2
4	Las Palmas	0	1	1
5	Tenerife	1	2	3

Final
6	Girona	0	3	3
5	Tenerife	0	1	1

=== Semi–finals ===
Team 1	Agg.	Team 2	1st leg	2nd leg
Girona	2–1 (a.e.t.)	Eibar	0–1	2–0
Tenerife	3–1	Las Palmas	1–0	2–1

==== First leg ====
1 June 2022
21:00 UTC+2

Tenerife	1–0	Las Palmas
León 36'	Report

Estadio Heliodoro Rodríguez López, Tenerife
Attendance: 19,702
Referee: Javier Iglesias Villanueva

Tenerife	Las Palmas

GK	1	(Spain) Juan Soriano
RB	21	(United States) Shaq Moore	(yellow card) 53'
CB	14	(Spain) Carlos Ruiz
CB	4	(Spain) José León
LB	22	(France) Jérémy Mellot
RM	28	(Spain) Víctor Mollejo		(substituted off) 89'
CM	6	(Spain) Álex Corredera		(substituted off) 65'
CM	16	(Spain) Aitor Sanz (c)
LM	11	(Spain) Álex Bermejo		(substituted off) 70'
CF	7	(Spain) Mario González		(substituted off) 56'
CF	18	(Spain) Enric Gallego
Substitutions:
GK	13	(Venezuela) Dani Hernández
GK	30	(Spain) Víctor Méndez
DF	3	(Spain) Álex Muñoz
DF	12	(Spain) Sergio González		(substituted on) 65'
DF	15	(Spain) Carlos Pomares		(substituted on) 89'
DF	23	(Montenegro) Nikola Šipčić
MF	10	(England) Samuel Shashoua
MF	17	(Spain) Matías Nahuel
MF	19	(Spain) Rubén Díez
MF	24	(Spain) Míchel Herrero
FW	9	(Spain) Elady Zorrilla		(substituted on) 70'
FW	20	(Spain) Andrés Martín		(substituted on) 56'
Manager:
(Spain) Luis Miguel Ramis

GK	13	(Spain) Álvaro Valles
RB	14	(Spain) Álvaro Lemos
CB	6	(Spain) Eric Curbelo
CB	16	(Spain) Raúl Navas
LB	30	(Spain) Sergi Cardona
RM	20	(Spain) Kirian Rodríguez
CM	22	(Democratic Republic of the Congo) Omenuke Mfulu
CM	21	(Spain) Jonathan Viera (c)
LM	28	(Spain) Alberto Moleiro	(substituted off) 79'
CF	9	(Spain) Rafa Mújica	(substituted off) 62'
CF	10	(Spain) Jesé	(substituted off) 62'
Substitutions:
GK	1	(Spain) Raúl Fernández
DF	2	(Spain) Álex Díez
DF	4	(Spain) Álex Suárez
DF	5	(Ecuador) Erick Ferigra
MF	8	(Spain) Maikel Mesa	(substituted on) 62'
MF	15	(Spain) Fabio González
MF	17	(Spain) Óscar Clemente
FW	3	(Portugal) Hernâni Fortes
FW	11	(Spain) Benito Ramírez
FW	18	(Spain) Pinchi
FW	24	(Spain) Pejiño	(substituted on) 79'
FW	25	(Spain) Rober	(substituted on) 62'
Manager:
(Spain) García Pimienta

2 June 2022
19:00 UTC+2

Girona	0–1	Eibar
	Report	Aketxe 28'

Estadi Montilivi, Girona
Attendance: 9,450
Referee: Luis Mario Milla Alvéndiz

Girona	Eibar

1	GK	(Spain) Juan Carlos
38	RB	(Spain) Arnau Martínez
22	CB	(Uruguay) Santiago Bueno
2	CB	(Colombia) Bernardo Espinosa
15	CB	(Spain) Juanpe		(substituted off) 46'
3	LB	(Spain) Jairo Izquierdo
8	RM	(Spain) Álex Baena
20	CM	(Spain) Pol Lozano		(substituted off) 46'
14	CM	(Spain) Aleix García
10	LM	(Spain) Samuel Sáiz		(substituted off) 74'
7	CF	(Uruguay) Cristhian Stuani	(yellow card) 42'
Substitutions:
13	GK	(Spain) Adrián Ortolá
31	DF	(Spain) Eric Monjonell
4	MF	(Spain) Víctor Sánchez
11	MF	(Spain) Valery Fernández
12	MF	(Spain) Iván Martín		(substituted on) 46'
21	MF	(Spain) Ramon Terrats
34	MF	(Spain) Álex Sala
36	MF	(Spain) Ricard Artero
16	FW	(Spain) Pablo Moreno		(substituted on) 46'
19	FW	(Argentina) Nahuel Bustos		(substituted on) 74'
32	FW	(Spain) Oscar Ureña
35	FW	(Spain) Pau Víctor
Manager:
(Spain) Míchel

1	GK	(Spain) Ander Cantero	(yellow card) 87'
4	RB	(Spain) Rober Correa	(yellow card) 90+2'
3	CB	(Portugal) Frederico Venâncio
25	CB	(Spain) Chema	(yellow card) 30'
15	LB	(Spain) Álvaro Tejero	(yellow card) 45+2'	(red card) 45+3'
6	CM	(Spain) Sergio Álvarez	(yellow card) 82'
10	CM	(Spain) Edu Expósito		(substituted off) 88'
17	RW	(Spain) José Corpas		(substituted off) 46'
22	AM	(Spain) Ager Aketxe		(substituted off) 80'
7	LW	(Spain) Quique González		(substituted off) 88'
9	CF	(Spain) Fran Sol		(substituted off) 63'
Substitutions:
13	GK	(Spain) Yoel
2	DF	(Argentina) Esteban Burgos
5	DF	(Spain) Xabier Etxeita		(substituted on) 88'
18	DF	(Spain) Toño		(substituted on) 88'
23	DF	(Spain) Anaitz Arbilla		(substituted on) 46'
24	DF	(Spain) Antonio Glauder
48	DF	(Spain) Iker Alday
21	MF	(France) Yanis Rahmani	(yellow card) 90+3'	(substituted on) 87'
35	MF	(Venezuela) Jorge Yriarte
12	FW	(Spain) Fernando Llorente
19	FW	(Spain) Stoichkov
20	FW	(Argentina) Gustavo Blanco		(substituted on) 63'
Manager:
(Spain) Gaizka Garitano

==== Second leg ====
4 June 2022
21:00 UTC+2

Las Palmas	1–2	Tenerife
Curbelo 71'	Report	Gallego 4', 45+6' (pen.)

Estadio de Gran Canaria, Las Palmas
Attendance: 31,502
Referee: Jon Ander González Esteban

Las Palmas	Tenerife

GK	13	(Spain) Álvaro Valles
RB	14	(Spain) Álvaro Lemos
CB	16	(Spain) Raúl Navas	(yellow card) 45+5'	(substituted off) 71'
CB	6	(Spain) Eric Curbelo
LB	30	(Spain) Sergi Cardona
CM	20	(Spain) Kirian Rodríguez
CM	22	(Democratic Republic of the Congo) Omenuke Mfulu
CM	21	(Spain) Jonathan Viera (c)	(yellow card) 31'	(substituted off) 42'
RW	25	(Spain) Rober		(substituted off) 65'
CF	10	(Spain) Jesé		(substituted off) 46'
LW	28	(Spain) Alberto Moleiro		(substituted off) 72'
Substitutions:
GK	1	(Spain) Raúl Fernández
DF	2	(Spain) Álex Díez
DF	4	(Spain) Álex Suárez		(substituted on) 71'
DF	5	(Ecuador) Erick Ferigra
MF	8	(Spain) Maikel Mesa		(substituted on) 42'
MF	15	(Spain) Fabio González
MF	17	(Spain) Óscar Clemente
FW	3	(Portugal) Hernâni Fortes
FW	11	(Spain) Benito Ramírez		(substituted on) 46'
FW	18	(Spain) Pinchi
FW	24	(Spain) Pejiño	(red card) 90+6'	(substituted on) 72'
FW	9	(Spain) Rafa Mújica		(substituted on) 65'
Manager:
(Spain) García Pimienta

GK	1	(Spain) Juan Soriano
RB	21	(United States) Shaq Moore
CB	12	(Spain) Sergio González
CB	4	(Spain) José León
LB	22	(France) Jérémy Mellot
RM	28	(Spain) Víctor Mollejo		(substituted off) 77'
CM	6	(Spain) Álex Corredera		(substituted off) 81'
CM	16	(Spain) Aitor Sanz (c)	(yellow card) 21'
LM	11	(Spain) Álex Bermejo		(substituted off) 60'
CF	7	(Spain) Mario González		(substituted off) 60'
CF	18	(Spain) Enric Gallego	(yellow card) 72'	(substituted off) 80'
Substitutions:
GK	13	(Venezuela) Dani Hernández
GK	30	(Spain) Víctor Méndez
DF	3	(Spain) Álex Muñoz
DF	14	(Spain) Carlos Ruiz
DF	15	(Spain) Carlos Pomares	(yellow card) 90+3'	(substituted on) 60'
DF	23	(Montenegro) Nikola Šipčić		(substituted on) 81'
MF	10	(England) Samuel Shashoua
MF	17	(Spain) Matías Nahuel
MF	19	(Spain) Rubén Díez
MF	24	(Spain) Míchel Herrero		(substituted on) 80'
FW	9	(Spain) Elady Zorrilla		(substituted on) 77'
FW	20	(Spain) Andrés Martín		(substituted on) 60'
Manager:
(Spain) Luis Miguel Ramis

5 June 2022
18:30 UTC+2

Eibar	0–2 (a.e.t.)	Girona
	Report	García 1'; Stuani 91'

Estadio Municipal de Ipurua, Eibar
Attendance: 6,846
Referee: Juan Luis Pulido Santana

Eibar	Girona

GK	1	(Spain) Ander Cantero
RB	4	(Spain) Rober Correa
CB	3	(Portugal) Frederico Venâncio
CB	25	(Spain) Chema
LB	23	(Spain) Anaitz Arbilla (c)		(substituted off) 99'
CM	6	(Spain) Sergio Álvarez	(yellow card) 27'	(substituted off) 99'
CM	10	(Spain) Edu Expósito
RW	17	(Spain) José Corpas	(yellow card) 48'	(substituted off) 77'
AM	22	(Spain) Ager Aketxe		(substituted off) 77'
LW	19	(Spain) Stoichkov		(substituted off) 105'
CF	20	(Argentina) Gustavo Blanco		(substituted off) 105'
Substitutions:
GK	13	(Spain) Yoel
GK	26	(Spain) Unai Ruiz-Zeberio
DF	2	(Argentina) Esteban Burgos
DF	5	(Spain) Xabier Etxeita
DF	18	(Spain) Toño		(substituted on) 99'
MF	11	(Argentina) Franchu
MF	14	(Spain) Javi Muñoz		(substituted on) 77'
MF	21	(France) Yanis Rahmani		(substituted on) 77'
MF	33	(Spain) Miguel Atienza
FW	7	(Spain) Quique González		(substituted on) 105'
FW	9	(Spain) Fran Sol		(substituted on) 99'
FW	12	(Spain) Fernando Llorente		(substituted on) 105'
Manager:
(Spain) Gaizka Garitano

GK	1	(Spain) Juan Carlos	(yellow card) 102'
RB	38	(Spain) Arnau Martínez
CB	22	(Uruguay) Santiago Bueno
CB	2	(Colombia) Bernardo Espinosa
CB	15	(Spain) Juanpe (c)
LB	11	(Spain) Valery Fernández		(substituted off) 106'
RM	8	(Spain) Álex Baena		(substituted off) 90'
CM	12	(Spain) Iván Martín		(substituted off) 74'
CM	20	(Spain) Pol Lozano		(substituted off) 87'
LM	24	(Spain) Borja García		(substituted off) 46'
CF	19	(Argentina) Nahuel Bustos		(substituted off) 74'
Substitutions:
GK	13	(Spain) Adrián Ortolá
DF	17	(Spain) David Juncà
MF	3	(Spain) Jairo Izquierdo		(substituted on) 74'
MF	4	(Spain) Víctor Sánchez		(substituted on) 87'
MF	10	(Spain) Samuel Sáiz		(substituted on) 90'
MF	14	(Spain) Aleix García		(substituted on) 46'
MF	21	(Spain) Ramon Terrats		(substituted on) 106'
MF	36	(Spain) Ricard Artero
FW	7	(Uruguay) Cristhian Stuani	(yellow card) 119'	(substituted on) 74'
FW	16	(Spain) Pablo Moreno
FW	32	(Spain) Oscar Ureña
Manager:
(Spain) Míchel

=== Final ===
Team 1	Agg.	Team 2	1st leg	2nd leg
Tenerife	1–3	Girona	0–0	1–3

==== First leg ====
11 June 2022
21:00 UTC+2

Girona	0–0	Tenerife
	Report

Estadi Montilivi, Girona
Attendance: 11,303
Referee: Francisco José Hernández Maeso

Girona	Tenerife

GK	1	(Spain) Juan Carlos
RB	38	(Spain) Arnau Martínez
CB	22	(Uruguay) Santiago Bueno
CB	2	(Colombia) Bernardo Espinosa
CB	15	(Spain) Juanpe		(substituted off) 79'
LB	11	(Spain) Valery Fernández		(substituted off) 90+7'
CM	14	(Spain) Aleix García		(substituted off) 90+8'
CM	20	(Spain) Pol Lozano	(yellow card) 25'
CM	12	(Spain) Iván Martín
CF	8	(Spain) Álex Baena	(yellow card) 75'	(substituted off) 79'
CF	7	(Uruguay) Cristhian Stuani (c)		(substituted off) 80'
Substitutions:
GK	13	(Spain) Adrián Ortolá
DF	17	(Spain) David Juncà
MF	3	(Spain) Jairo Izquierdo		(substituted on) 79'
MF	4	(Spain) Víctor Sánchez
MF	10	(Spain) Samuel Sáiz		(substituted on) 79'
MF	21	(Spain) Ramon Terrats
MF	34	(Spain) Álex Sala
MF	36	(Spain) Ricard Artero		(substituted on) 90+8'
FW	16	(Spain) Pablo Moreno
FW	19	(Argentina) Nahuel Bustos		(substituted on) 80'
FW	32	(Spain) Oscar Ureña		(substituted on) 90+7'
FW	35	(Spain) Pau Víctor
Manager:
(Spain) Míchel

GK	1	(Spain) Juan Soriano
RB	21	(United States) Shaq Moore
CB	12	(Spain) Sergio González
CB	4	(Spain) José León
LB	22	(France) Jérémy Mellot
RM	11	(Spain) Álex Bermejo		(substituted off) 80'
CM	6	(Spain) Álex Corredera		(substituted off) 80'
CM	16	(Spain) Aitor Sanz (c)
LM	28	(Spain) Víctor Mollejo		(substituted off) 80'
CF	18	(Spain) Enric Gallego
CF	7	(Spain) Mario González		(substituted off) 61'
Substitutions:
GK	13	(Venezuela) Dani Hernández
GK	30	(Spain) Víctor Méndez
DF	3	(Spain) Álex Muñoz
DF	14	(Spain) Carlos Ruiz		(substituted on) 80'
DF	15	(Spain) Carlos Pomares		(substituted on) 80'
MF	10	(England) Samuel Shashoua
MF	17	(Spain) Matías Nahuel
MF	19	(Spain) Rubén Díez
MF	24	(Spain) Míchel Herrero
FW	9	(Spain) Elady Zorrilla	(yellow card) 68'	(substituted on) 61'
FW	20	(Spain) Andrés Martín	(yellow card) 90+1'	(substituted on) 80'
Manager:
(Spain) Luis Miguel Ramis

==== Second leg ====
19 June 2022
21:00 UTC+2

Tenerife	1–3	Girona
Ruiz 59'	Report	Stuani 42' (pen.); León 68' (o.g.); Arnau 80'

Estadio Heliodoro Rodríguez López, Tenerife
Attendance: 22,077
Referee: Dámaso Arcediano Monescillo

Tenerife	Girona

GK	1	(Spain) Juan Soriano
RB	21	(United States) Shaq Moore
CB	12	(Spain) Sergio González	(yellow card) 41'	(substituted off) 46'
CB	4	(Spain) José León
LB	22	(France) Jérémy Mellot		(substituted off) 78'
RM	11	(Spain) Álex Bermejo		(substituted off) 65'
CM	6	(Spain) Álex Corredera	(yellow card) 13'	(substituted off) 81'
CM	16	(Spain) Aitor Sanz (c)
LM	28	(Spain) Víctor Mollejo
CF	18	(Spain) Enric Gallego	(yellow card) 31'
CF	7	(Spain) Mario González		(substituted off) 65'
Substitutions:
GK	13	(Venezuela) Dani Hernández
GK	30	(Spain) Víctor Méndez
DF	3	(Spain) Álex Muñoz		(substituted on) 78'
DF	14	(Spain) Carlos Ruiz		(substituted on) 46'
DF	15	(Spain) Carlos Pomares
DF	23	(Montenegro) Nikola Šipčić
MF	10	(England) Samuel Shashoua		(substituted on) 65'
MF	17	(Spain) Matías Nahuel
MF	19	(Spain) Rubén Díez
MF	24	(Spain) Míchel Herrero
FW	9	(Spain) Elady Zorrilla		(substituted on) 65'
FW	20	(Spain) Andrés Martín		(substituted on) 81'
Manager:
(Spain) Luis Miguel Ramis

GK	1	(Spain) Juan Carlos
RB	38	(Spain) Arnau Martínez		(substituted off) 90+1'
CB	22	(Uruguay) Santiago Bueno
CB	2	(Colombia) Bernardo Espinosa
CB	15	(Spain) Juanpe	(yellow card) 34'
LB	11	(Spain) Valery Fernández
CM	14	(Spain) Aleix García	(yellow card) 90'
CM	20	(Spain) Pol Lozano
CM	12	(Spain) Iván Martín		(substituted off) 18'
CF	8	(Spain) Álex Baena	(yellow card) 68'	(substituted off) 90+1'
CF	7	(Uruguay) Cristhian Stuani (c)		(substituted off) 85'
Substitutions:
GK	13	(Spain) Adrián Ortolá
DF	17	(Spain) David Juncà
MF	3	(Spain) Jairo Izquierdo		(substituted on) 90+1'
MF	4	(Spain) Víctor Sánchez	(yellow card) 90+8'	(substituted on) 84'
MF	10	(Spain) Samuel Sáiz	(yellow card) 81'	(substituted on) 18' (substituted off) 84'
MF	21	(Spain) Ramon Terrats		(substituted on) 90+1'
MF	34	(Spain) Álex Sala
MF	36	(Spain) Ricard Artero		(substituted on) 90+8'
FW	16	(Spain) Pablo Moreno	(yellow card) 81'
FW	19	(Argentina) Nahuel Bustos		(substituted on) 85'
FW	32	(Spain) Oscar Ureña
FW	35	(Spain) Pau Víctor
Manager:
(Spain) Míchel
