= Adrián Ortolá =

Spanish footballer

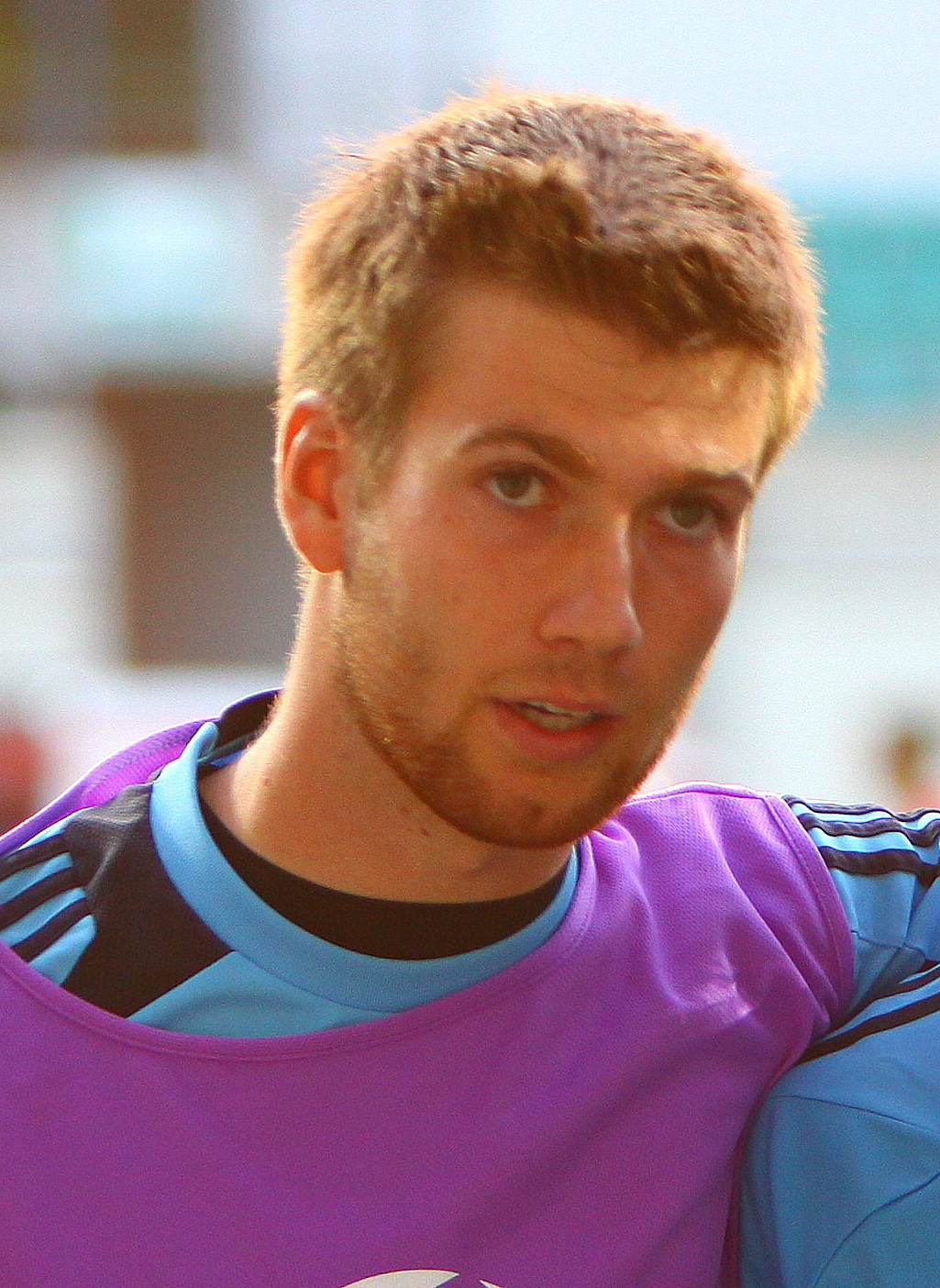
- Ortolá with Spain U19 in 2012

Personal information
- Full name: Adrián Ortolá Vañó
- Date of birth: 20 August 1993 (age 33)
- Place of birth: Xàbia, Spain
- Height: 1.87 m (6 ft 2 in)
- Position: Goalkeeper

Team information
- Current team: Guingamp
- Number: 16

Youth career
- 2003–2005: Jávea
- 2005–2008: Alicante
- 2008–2011: Villarreal

Senior career*
Years	Team	Apps	(Gls)
2011–2012	Villarreal C	34	(0)
2012–2013	Villarreal B	9	(0)
2013–2018	Barcelona B	97	(0)
2016–2017	→ Alavés (loan)	2	(0)
2018–2019	Barcelona	0	(0)
2018–2019	→ Deportivo La Coruña (loan)	0	(0)
2019–2021	Tenerife	51	(0)
2021–2022	Girona	4	(0)
2022–2023	Deinze	5	(0)
2023–2024	Sabadell	52	(0)
2024–2025	Dunkerque	19	(0)
2025–	Guingamp	28	(0)

International career
2010	Spain U17	8	(0)
2011	Spain U18	2	(0)
2011–2012	Spain U19	4	(0)
2012–2013	Spain U20	4	(0)
Medal record
Men's football
Representing Spain
UEFA European Under-17 Championship
Runner-up	2010 Liechtenstein
- * Club domestic league appearances and goals as of 17:22, 29 September 2026 (UTC)

Adrián Ortolá Vañó (born 20 August 1993) is a Spanish professional footballer who plays as a goalkeeper for Ligue 2 club Guingamp.

== Club career ==
=== Villarreal ===
Born in Xàbia, Province of Alicante, Valencian Community, Ortolá joined local Villarreal CF's youth system in 2008. He made his senior debut with the B team in Segunda División B, his first game in the competition being a 3–0 away loss against CF Reus Deportiu on 2 September 2012.

=== Barcelona ===
On 10 July 2013, Ortolá moved to FC Barcelona, signing for three years as a free agent and being assigned to their reserves in the Segunda División. He played his first match as a professional on 30 November, in a 2–1 win at Córdoba CF.

Ortolá made 26 appearances in his second season, which ended with relegation to the third division. On 21 March 2015, he was given a straight red card in the 25th minute of an eventual 2–1 away defeat to AD Alcorcón for conceding a penalty kick with a foul on David Rodríguez.

On 11 July 2016, Ortolá was loaned to La Liga club Deportivo Alavés for one year, with the option for another. He made his debut in the competition on 8 January 2017, starting at Athletic Bilbao as habitual starter Fernando Pacheco was not fully fit and contributing to the 0–0 away draw.

On 24 July 2018, Ortolá joined Deportivo de La Coruña on a season-long loan deal with the option to buy.

=== Tenerife ===
On 12 July 2019, Ortolá signed a two-year contract with CD Tenerife. He immediately became a starter for the club ahead of longtime incumbent Dani Hernández, but lost his starting spot to the same player after the arrival of new manager Luis Miguel Ramis in November 2020.

=== Girona ===
Ortolá joined fellow second-division side Girona FC on 1 February 2021, on a two-and-a-half-year deal. A backup to Juan Carlos, he contributed four matches in the 2021–22 campaign as his side achieved promotion to the top tier.

On 4 August 2022, Ortolá terminated his contract.

=== Later career ===
Ortolá moved abroad for the first time in his career on 5 August 2022, agreeing to a one-year contract at K.M.S.K. Deinze from Belgium. He left by mutual consent the following 30 January, joining CE Sabadell FC in his homeland later that day.

In September 2024, Ortolá signed for French Ligue 2 club USL Dunkerque. On 8 July 2025, he joined En Avant Guingamp in the same league.

== Career statistics ==
As of 9 May 2026

Appearances and goals by club, season and competition
Club	Season	League			Cup		Other		Total	
Club	Season	Division	Apps	Goals	Apps	Goals	Apps	Goals	Apps	Goals
Villarreal C	2011–12	Tercera División	34	0	—		—		34	0
Villarreal B	2012–13	Segunda División B	9	0	—		—		9	0
Barcelona B	2013–14	Segunda División	7	0	—		—		7	0
Barcelona B	2014–15	Segunda División	26	0	—		—		26	0
Barcelona B	2015–16	Segunda División B	34	0	—		—		34	0
Barcelona B	2017–18	Segunda División	30	0	—		—		30	0
Barcelona B	Total		97	0	0	0	—		97	0
Alavés (loan)	2016–17	La Liga	2	0	6	0	—		8	0
Deportivo (loan)	2018–19	Segunda División	0	0	1	0	—		1	0
Tenerife	2019–20	Segunda División	37	0	2	0	—		39	0
Tenerife	2020–21	Segunda División	14	0	2	0	—		16	0
Tenerife	Total		51	0	4	0	—		55	0
Girona	2020–21	Segunda División	0	0	0	0	—		0	0
Girona	2021–22	Segunda División	4	0	2	0	—		6	0
Girona	Total		4	0	2	0	—		6	0
Deinze	2022–23	Challenger Pro League	5	0	0	0	—		5	0
Sabadell	2022–23	Primera Federación	14	0	0	0	—		14	0
Sabadell	2023–24	Primera Federación	38	0	0	0	—		38	0
Sabadell	Total		52	0	0	0	0	0	52	0
Dunkerque	2024–25	Ligue 2	19	0	0	0	0	0	19	0
Guingamp	2025–26	Ligue 2	21	0	1	0	0	0	22	0
Career total			294	0	14	0	0	0	308	0

== Honours ==
Spain U17

- UEFA European Under-17 Championship runner-up: 2010

Spain U19

- UEFA European Under-19 Championship: 2011, 2012
