= David Juncà =

Spanish footballer

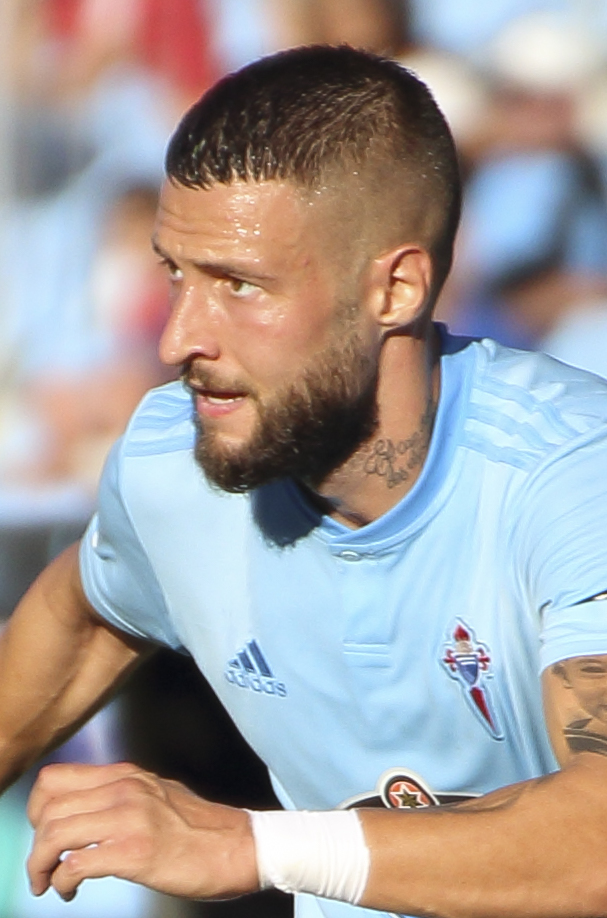
- Juncà with Celta in 2018

Personal information
- Full name: David Juncà Reñe
- Date of birth: 16 November 1993 (age 32)
- Place of birth: Riumors, Spain
- Height: 1.75 m (5 ft 9 in)
- Position: Left-back

Team information
- Current team: Santa Coloma
- Number: 28

Youth career
- 2002–2006: Figueres
- 2006–2008: Barcelona
- 2008–2010: Mallorca
- 2010–2011: Girona

Senior career*
| Years | Team | Apps | (Gls) |
| 2011–2012 | Riudellots | 19 | (3) |
| 2011–2015 | Girona | 60 | (2) |
| 2012–2013 | Girona B | 1 | (0) |
| 2015–2018 | Eibar | 55 | (0) |
| 2018–2021 | Celta | 24 | (0) |
| 2021–2022 | Girona | 25 | (1) |
| 2023–2024 | Wisła Kraków | 30 | (1) |
| 2024–2025 | Inter d'Escaldes | 10 | (0) |
| 2025–2026 | Gimnàstic | 13 | (0) |
| 2026– | Santa Coloma | 6 | (0) |
- * Club domestic league appearances and goals as of 14 June 2026

David Juncà Reñe (born 16 November 1993) is a Spanish professional footballer who plays as a left-back for Primera Divisió club FC Santa Coloma.

== Club career ==
=== Girona ===
Born in Riumors, Girona, Catalonia, Juncà was a product of Girona FC's youth system. He made his official debut with the first team on 17 December 2011, playing one minute in a 3–2 home win against Gimnàstic de Tarragona in the Segunda División.

The following two seasons, Juncá played for both the reserves and farm team CF Riudellots. Returned for 2014–15, he scored his first goal as a professional on 14 September 2014, closing the 1–1 away draw with Sporting de Gijón.

=== Eibar ===
Juncà signed a three-year deal with La Liga club SD Eibar on 28 July 2015, after being terminated at the Estadi Montilivi. He made his debut in the competition on 24 August, coming on as a second-half substitute for Saúl Berjón in the 3–1 away victory over Granada CF.

=== Celta ===
On 4 June 2018, the free agent Juncà agreed to a five-year contract at fellow top-flight side RC Celta de Vigo. He contributed 21 matches in his debut campaign for the last team above the relegation zone, but subsequently spent nearly two years on the sidelines due to several injury problems.

=== Girona return ===
Juncà returned to Girona on 26 July 2021, having joined on a one-year deal. He totalled 28 appearances in his second spell, winning promotion to the top tier in the playoffs.

=== Wisła Kraków ===
Having started the 2022–23 season without a team, Juncà signed a six-month deal with Polish I liga club Wisła Kraków on 29 December 2022. He made one Polish Cup appearance during the following campaign, playing the first half of a 2–1 first-round win over Lechia Gdańsk after extra time as his team went on to win the competition.

After not having his contract extended, Juncà left in June 2024.

=== Later career ===
On 14 January 2025, following a brief spell in Andorra with Inter Club d'Escaldes, Juncà returned to his home country and signed an 18-month contract with Primera Federación side Gimnàstic de Tarragona. One year later, he terminated his link.

== Career statistics ==
As of match played 15 December 2024

Appearances and goals by club, season and competition
| Club | Season | League | | | National cup (Note: Includes Copa del Rey, Polish Cup) | | Other | | Total | |
| Club | Season | Division | Apps | Goals | Apps | Goals | Apps | Goals | Apps | Goals |
|---|---|---|---|---|---|---|---|---|---|---|
| Girona | 2010–11 | Segunda División | 0 | 0 | 0 | 0 | — | | 0 | 0 |
| Girona | 2011–12 | Segunda División | 8 | 0 | 0 | 0 | — | | 8 | 0 |
| Girona | 2012–13 | Segunda División | 9 | 0 | 1 | 0 | 1 (Note: Appearances in La Liga play-offs) | 0 | 11 | 0 |
| Girona | 2013–14 | Segunda División | 25 | 0 | 2 | 1 | — | | 27 | 1 |
| Girona | 2014–15 | Segunda División | 18 | 2 | 0 | 0 | 2 | 0 | 20 | 2 |
| Girona | Total | | 60 | 2 | 3 | 1 | 3 | 0 | 66 | 3 |
| Eibar | 2015–16 | La Liga | 31 | 0 | 2 | 0 | — | | 0 | 0 |
| Eibar | 2016–17 | La Liga | 9 | 0 | 3 | 0 | — | | 0 | 0 |
| Eibar | 2017–18 | La Liga | 15 | 0 | 1 | 0 | — | | 0 | 0 |
| Eibar | Total | | 55 | 0 | 6 | 0 | 0 | 0 | 61 | 0 |
| Celta | 2018–19 | La Liga | 21 | 0 | 0 | 0 | — | | 0 | 0 |
| Celta | 2019–20 | La Liga | 3 | 0 | 0 | 0 | — | | 0 | 0 |
| Celta | 2020–21 | La Liga | 0 | 0 | 0 | 0 | — | | 0 | 0 |
| Celta | Total | | 24 | 0 | 0 | 0 | 0 | 0 | 24 | 0 |
| Girona | 2021–22 | Segunda División | 25 | 1 | 3 | 1 | — | | 28 | 2 |
| Wisła Kraków | 2022–23 | I liga | 12 | 1 | — | | 1 (Note: Appearance in I liga promotion play-offs) | 0 | 13 | 1 |
| Wisła Kraków | 2023–24 | I liga | 17 | 0 | 1 | 0 | — | | 18 | 0 |
| Wisła Kraków | Total | | 29 | 1 | 1 | 0 | 1 | 0 | 31 | 1 |
| Inter d'Escaldes | 2024–25 | Primera Divisió | 10 | 0 | 0 | 0 | 1 (Note: Appearance in Andorran Supercup) | 0 | 11 | 0 |
| Career total | | | 203 | 4 | 13 | 2 | 5 | 0 | 221 | 6 |

== Honours ==
Wisła Kraków

- Polish Cup: 2023–24
