= Carlos Ruiz (footballer, born 1983) =

Spanish footballer

Personal information
- Full name: Carlos Ruiz Aranega
- Date of birth: 20 July 1983 (age 43)
- Place of birth: Baza, Spain
- Height: 1.83 m (6 ft 0 in)
- Position: Defensive midfielder

Youth career
- Baza

Senior career*
Years	Team	Apps	(Gls)
2002–2004	Baza		
2004–2005	Imperio Albolote		
2005–2006	Arenas Armilla	34	(4)
2006–2007	Baza	36	(6)
2007–2009	Granada	44	(4)
2009–2011	Melilla	71	(6)
2011–2013	Ponferradina	67	(3)
2013–2023	Tenerife	274	(13)
Total		526	(36)
- * Club domestic league appearances and goals

Carlos Ruiz Aranega (born 20 July 1983) is a Spanish former professional footballer who played mainly as a defensive midfielder.

He totalled 307 Segunda División games in 11 seasons, scoring 14 goals for Ponferradina and Tenerife.

== Club career ==
Born in Baza, Granada, Andalusia, Ruiz spent ten professional seasons with CD Tenerife, having signed in June 2013 from SD Ponferradina. He scored his first goal in the Segunda División on 19 August 2012 while at the service of the latter club, but in a 4–2 away loss against Elche CF.

During his tenure at the Estadio Heliodoro Rodríguez López, Ruiz made 286 competitive appearances, scored 17 goals and was sent off eight times, never being relegated and also taking part in the 2022 La Liga play-offs, netting in the 3–1 home defeat to Girona FC in the final. He retired on 10 August 2023, shortly after turning 40.

Ruiz was named Tenerife's youth system coordinator on 11 June 2025.
