= Santiago Bueno =

Uruguayan footballer (born 1998)

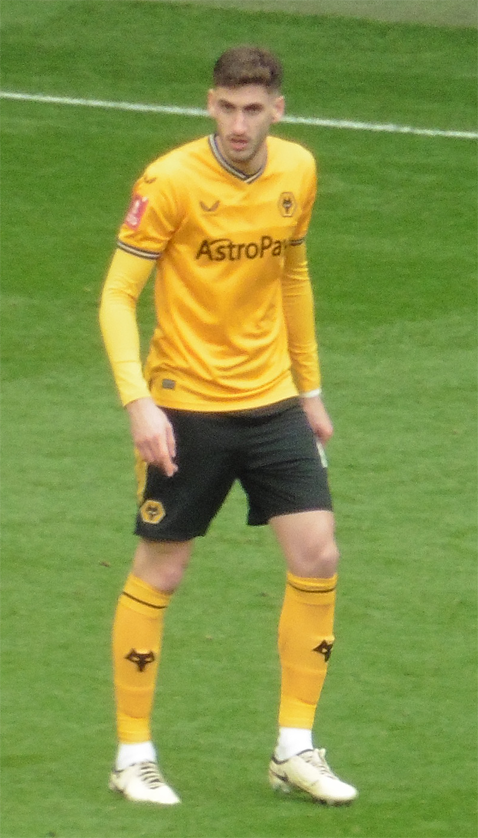
- Bueno playing for Wolverhampton Wanderers in 2024

Personal information
- Full name: Santiago Ignacio Bueno Sciutto
- Date of birth: 9 November 1998 (age 27)
- Place of birth: Montevideo, Uruguay
- Height: 1.90 m (6 ft 3 in)
- Position: Centre-back

Team information
- Current team: América (on loan from Wolverhampton Wanderers)
- Number: 14

Youth career
- Peñarol
- 2017: Barcelona

Senior career*
Years	Team	Apps	(Gls)
2017–2019	Barcelona B	0	(0)
2018	→ Peralada-Girona B (loan)	12	(1)
2018–2019	→ Peralada-Girona B (loan)	29	(2)
2019–2023	Girona	110	(3)
2023–	Wolverhampton Wanderers	70	(3)
2026–	→ América (loan)	1	(1)

International career^{‡}
2014–2015	Uruguay U17	25	(0)
2016–2017	Uruguay U20	27	(2)
2020	Uruguay U23	5	(2)
2023–	Uruguay	8	(0)
- * Club domestic league appearances and goals as of 03:16, 12 October 2026 (UTC) ‡ National team caps and goals as of 13 October 2025

Santiago Ignacio Bueno Sciutto (born 9 November 1998) is a Uruguayan professional footballer who plays as a centre-back for Liga MX club América, on loan from EFL Championship club Wolverhampton Wanderers and the Uruguay national team.

== Club career ==
=== Peñarol ===
Born in Montevideo, Bueno joined Peñarol in 2009, aged ten. On 5 January 2016, he was promoted to the first team squad.

Bueno made his unofficial first team debut on 23 January 2016, playing the entire second-half of a 1–1 draw against Club Libertad in the Copa Antel friendly tournament.

=== Barcelona ===
On 31 January 2017, Barcelona reached an agreement with Peñarol for the transfer of Bueno. He signed a two-and-a-half-year contract with the Catalans. Barcelona had followed his progress for a year before signing him.

==== Peralada (loans) ====
On 24 January 2018, Bueno was loaned to Segunda División B side Peralada-Girona B until the end of the season. He returned to the side on 31 August 2018, for a second loan spell.

=== Girona ===
On 19 August 2019, Bueno signed a five-year contract with Girona in the second division, as a free agent. He made his debut for the club on 19 December, starting in a 2–1 away win against Linares Deportivo in that season's Copa del Rey.

Bueno made his professional debut on 20 July 2020, coming on as a late substitute for Christian Rivera in a 2–0 loss at Alcorcón in the Segunda División. He scored his first professional goal on 10 April 2021, but in a 2–1 loss against Rayo Vallecano, and was a regular starter during the 2021–22 season as the club achieved promotion to La Liga.

Bueno made his debut in the Spanish top tier on 14 August 2022, starting in a 1–0 away loss to Valencia. The following 23 January, he renewed his contract until 2026.

=== Wolverhampton Wanderers ===
On 30 August 2023, Bueno underwent a medical for a transfer to English club Wolverhampton Wanderers. A day later, he officially joined the club for a reported £8.5 million fee, signing a five-year contract. He made his debut in an EFL Cup game away to Ipswich Town on 26 September 2023. Bueno made his Premier League debut in a controversial 3–2 defeat away to Fulham on 27 November 2023 that featured three penalties.

On 27 September 2025, he scored his first goal for the club and first ever Premier League goal in a 1–1 draw with Tottenham.

In September 2026, Bueno joined Liga MX club Club América on loan.

== International career ==
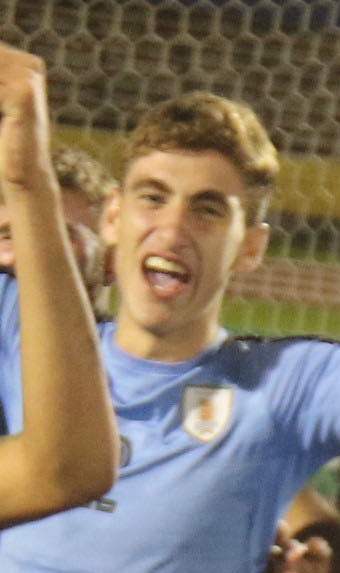
Bueno with the Uruguay under-20 team in 2017

Bueno has represented Uruguay at under-17 and under-20 youth international levels. In December 2019, he was called up to the under-23 team for the 2020 CONMEBOL Pre-Olympic Tournament.

On 21 October 2022, Bueno was named in Uruguay's 55-man preliminary squad for the 2022 FIFA World Cup, but did not make it to the final squad. He made his debut with the full side on 24 March 2023, starting in a 1–1 friendly draw against Japan at the Japan National Stadium in Tokyo. On 31 May 2026, he was named in Uruguay's 26-man squad for the 2026 FIFA World Cup.

== Personal life ==
Bueno is the younger brother of professional footballer Gastón Bueno. His cousin Gonzalo Bueno is a former Uruguayan youth international.

== Career statistics ==
=== Club ===
As of match played on 24 May 2026

Appearances and goals by club, season and competition
Club	Season	League			National cup (Note: Includes Copa del Rey and FA Cup)		League cup (Note: Includes EFL Cup)		Other		Total	
Club	Season	Division	Apps	Goals	Apps	Goals	Apps	Goals	Apps	Goals	Apps	Goals
Barcelona	2017–18	La Liga	0	0	0	0	–		–		0	0
Barcelona	2018–19	La Liga	0	0	0	0	–		–		0	0
Barcelona	Total		0	0	0	0	0	0	0	0	0	0
Peralada-Girona B (loan)	2017–18	Segunda División B	12	1	0	0	–		–		12	1
Peralada-Girona B (loan)	2018–19	Segunda División B	29	2	0	0	–		–		29	2
Girona	2019–20	Segunda División	1	0	1	0	–		–		2	0
Girona	2020–21	Segunda División	40	2	3	1	–		–		43	3
Girona	2021–22	Segunda División	35	1	4	0	–		–		39	1
Girona	2022–23	La Liga	34	0	2	0	–		–		36	0
Girona	Total		110	3	10	1	0	0	0	0	120	4
Wolverhampton Wanderers	2023–24	Premier League	12	0	4	0	1	0	–		17	0
Wolverhampton Wanderers	2024–25	Premier League	29	0	3	0	2	0	–		34	0
Wolverhampton Wanderers	2025–26	Premier League	29	3	3	1	2	0	–		34	4
Wolverhampton Wanderers	2026–27	Championship	0	0	0	0	0	0	–		0	0
Wolverhampton Wanderers	Total		70	3	10	1	5	0	0	0	85	4
Club América (loan)	2026–27	Liga MX	0	0	0	0	–		–		0	0
Career total			221	9	20	2	5	0	0	0	246	11

=== International ===
As of match played on 13 October 2025

Appearances and goals by national team and year
National team	Year	Apps	Goals
Uruguay	2023	2	0
Uruguay	2024	4	0
Uruguay	2025	2	0
Total		8	0

== Honours ==
Uruguay U20

- South American Youth Football Championship: 2017
