= Haritz Mújika =

Spanish footballer

Personal information
- Full name: Haritz Mújika López
- Date of birth: 13 November 1981 (age 45)
- Place of birth: Pasaia, Spain
- Height: 1.71 m (5 ft 7 in)
- Position: Forward

Youth career
- 1997–2000: Antiguoko

Senior career*
Years	Team	Apps	(Gls)
2000–2001	Beasain	35	(16)
2001–2003	Real Sociedad B	31	(2)
2003–2006	Real Unión	98	(16)
2006–2007	Burgos	15	(4)
2007–2008	Castelldefels	24	(4)
2008–2009	Zamora	11	(4)
2009–2014	Mirandés	152	(27)
2014–2017	Real Unión	74	(9)
2017–2019	Amorebieta	47	(2)
Total		487	(84)

Managerial career
- 2019–2022: Amorebieta (assistant)
- 2022–2023: Amorebieta
- * Club domestic league appearances and goals

Haritz Mújika López (born 13 November 1981) is a Spanish former professional footballer who played mainly as a forward, currently a manager.

He played 53 Segunda División games and scored eight goals for Mirandés, but spent most of his career in the Segunda División B, featuring in 434 matches and scoring 76 times for eight clubs, mainly Real Unión and Mirandés.

== Playing career ==
Born in Pasaia, Gipuzkoa, Mújika spent 11 of his first 12 seasons as a senior in the Segunda División B, starting at SD Beasain then representing Real Sociedad's B team – he also played with them in the Tercera División – Real Unión, Burgos CF, UE Castelldefels, Zamora CF and CD Mirandés. With the latter club, he was an undisputed starter in his early years, scoring seven goals in 37 matches in 2011–12 to help gain promotion to Segunda División for the first time in history.

Mújika made his debut in the competition at nearly 31 years of age, playing the full 90 minutes in a 0–1 home loss against SD Huesca on 17 August 2012. He scored his first goal as a professional on 13 January 2013, closing the 1–1 draw at Sporting de Gijón.

Mújika left Mirandés in August 2014, and signed for Real Unión in the third division. He moved to SD Amorebieta of the same league in 2017, retiring two years later at the age of 37.

== Coaching career ==
Immediately after retiring, Mújika joined Iñigo Vélez's technical staff at his last club Amorebieta, as an assistant manager. On 8 March 2022, he was appointed at the helm of the team (newcomers to the second tier) after the latter's dismissal. On his debut, five days later, he lost 1–0 at SD Eibar.

Mújika ended his first season with relegation. His team bounced back immediately from Primera Federación, taking first place from CD Eldense on head-to-head.

On 11 December 2023, Mújika was dismissed.

== Managerial statistics ==
As of 9 December 2023

Managerial record by team and tenure
Team	Nat	From	To	Record								Ref
Team	Nat	From	To	G	W	D	L	GF	GA	GD	Win %	Ref
Amorebieta	(Spain)	8 March 2022	11 December 2023	73	29	19	25	78	75	+3	39.73	
Career total				73	29	19	25	78	75	+3	39.73	—
