= Roberto Barba =

Spanish footballer (born 1999)

Personal information
- Full name: Roberto Barba Castillo
- Date of birth: 19 May 1999 (age 27)
- Place of birth: Jerez de la Frontera, Spain
- Height: 1.69 m (5 ft 7 in)
- Positions: Left back; winger

Team information
- Current team: Huesca B
- Number: 20

Youth career
- 2006–2010: Veteranos Xerez
- 2010–2012: Sevilla
- 2012–2013: Xerez
- 2013–2018: Sanluqueño

Senior career*
Years	Team	Apps	(Gls)
2015–2019	Sanluqueño	7	(0)
2018–2019	Sanluqueño B	19	(3)
2019–2020	Arcos	19	(1)
2020–	Huesca B	34	(1)
2021–	Huesca	0	(0)
- * Club domestic league appearances and goals as of 14 December 2021

Roberto Barba Castillo (born 19 May 1999) is a Spanish footballer who plays for SD Huesca B as either a left back or a left winger.

== Club career ==
Born in Jerez de la Frontera, Cádiz, Andalusia, Barba finished his formation with Atlético Sanluqueño CF. On 19 December 2015, aged just 16, he made his first team debut by playing ten minutes in a 1–1 Tercera División home draw against UD Roteña.

Barba subsequently featured for the B-team in the regional leagues, and also appeared in six first team matches during the 2018–19 campaign, in Segunda División B. In August 2019, he moved to Tercera División side Arcos CF, where he featured regularly until the competition was suspended due to the COVID-19 pandemic.

On 11 June 2020, Barba signed for SD Huesca and was assigned to the reserves also in the fourth division. He was a regular starter for the B's during the campaign, as his side achieved promotion to Segunda División RFEF.

Barba made his first team debut on 30 November 2021, starting a 2–0 success at CD Cayón, for the season's Copa del Rey. He made his professional debut on 14 December, starting in a 0–1 home loss against Girona FC, also for the national cup.
