= García Pimienta =

Spanish footballer and manager

Francisco García Pimienta
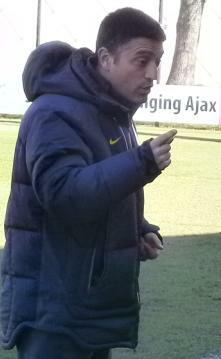
- Pimienta with Barcelona youth in 2012

Personal information
- Full name: Francisco Javier García Pimienta
- Date of birth: 3 August 1974 (age 52)
- Place of birth: Barcelona, Spain
- Height: 1.74 m (5 ft 8 1/2 in)
- Position: Winger

Team information
- Current team: Almería (manager)

Youth career
- 1986–1992: Barcelona

Senior career*
Years	Team	Apps	(Gls)
1993–1995	Barcelona C	15	(2)
1995–1999	Barcelona B	68	(11)
1997	Barcelona	1	(0)
1996–1997	→ Extremadura (loan)	4	(0)
1998	→ Figueres (loan)	9	(1)
1999–2003	Hospitalet	78	(12)
2003–2004	Sant Andreu	22	(3)
Total		197	(29)

International career
1990	Spain U16	4	(4)

Managerial career
- 2018–2021: Barcelona B
- 2022–2024: Las Palmas
- 2024–2025: Sevilla
- 2026–: Almería
- * Club domestic league appearances and goals

Francisco Javier García Pimienta (born 3 August 1974), known as García Pimienta, is a Spanish football manager and former player. He is the current manager of UD Almería.

A left winger, García Pimienta made his senior debut with Barcelona's C-team, and later represented the reserves before making his first team debut in 1997. He featured in a further four La Liga matches with Extremadura, and subsequently went on to resume his career in the lower leagues. As a coach, he worked for Barça for twenty years, being named in charge of the B-side in 2018 but being dismissed in 2021.

== Club career ==
Born in Barcelona, Catalonia, García Pimienta joined Barcelona's youth setup in 1986. After making his senior debut for the C-side in Tercera División, he first played as a professional with the reserves in Segunda División.

García Pimienta made his first team – and La Liga – debut on 26 May 1996, starting in a 2–2 away draw against Deportivo de La Coruña. On 14 July, he was loaned to fellow top tier side Extremadura for one year, but appeared rarely after suffering a serious injury which kept him out for the majority of the campaign.

Upon returning, García Pimienta was assigned back to the B-team, achieving promotion from Segunda División B. After a four-month loan at fellow league team Figueres, he moved to L'Hospitalet in a permanent basis.

García Pimienta retired in 2004 at the age of 29, after playing for Sant Andreu.

== Managerial career ==
In 2001, while still a player, García Pimienta was the assistant of Álex García at Barcelona's Cadete squad. He left the club in 2003, only returning three years later now as manager of the very same category.

After progressing through the youth setup, García Pimienta was named Gerard López's assistant at the B-side on 21 July 2015. On 25 October 2017, he replaced Gabri at the helm of the Juvenil A squad.

After winning the 2017–18 UEFA Youth League, García Pimienta was appointed at the helm of the reserves on 25 April 2018, after the sacking of Gerard. His debut in senior coaching was three days later, a 1–0 loss at Almería in the second division as his team ended the season relegated.

In three full seasons in charge of Barcelona B in the third tier, García Pimienta made the playoffs in the latter two campaigns, losing the 2020 final 2–1 to neighbours Sabadell, and the semi-final on penalties to Murcia a year later. On 11 June 2021, following the latter defeat, he was dismissed after the club terminated his contract.

On 24 January 2022, García Pimienta was named manager of Las Palmas in the second division, replacing Pepe Mel at a team in eighth place and three points off the playoffs. Having fallen to 14th after a poor start, he led them to an eleven-game unbeaten run with nine victories to reach fourth place and a post-season berth, where they were eliminated in the semi-finals by Canary Islands rivals Tenerife. By the anniversary of his appointment, he had taken 63% of the available points from 42 league games. In the 2022/23 season, he led Las Palmas to promotion to the first division.

On 2 June 2024, García Pimienta was named the new head coach of fellow La Liga club Sevilla, signing on a two-year deal. The following 13 April, he was dismissed.

On 30 June 2026, García Pimienta was announced as manager of Almería in division two.

== Managerial statistics ==
As of 14 November 2026

Managerial record by team and tenure
Team	Nat	From	To	Record								Ref
Team	Nat	From	To	G	W	D	L	GF	GA	GD	Win %	Ref
Barcelona B	(Spain)	25 April 2018	11 June 2021	102	45	28	29	142	107	+35	44.12	
Las Palmas	(Spain)	24 January 2022	2 June 2024	105	41	34	30	114	99	+15	39.05	
Sevilla	(Spain)	2 June 2024	13 April 2025	34	11	9	14	41	47	−6	32.35	
Almería	(Spain)	30 June 2026	Present	15	11	2	2	28	12	+16	73.33	
Total				256	108	73	75	325	265	+60	42.19	—

== Honours ==
=== Manager ===
Barcelona

- UEFA Youth League: 2017–18
