= Luis Miguel Ramis =

Spanish footballer & coach (born 1970)

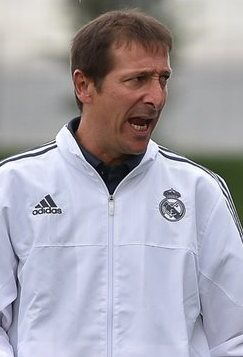
- Ramis coaching Real Madrid youths in 2015

Personal information
- Full name: Luis Miguel Ramis Monfort
- Date of birth: 25 July 1970 (age 56)
- Place of birth: Tarragona, Spain
- Height: 1.90 m (6 ft 3 in)
- Position: Centre-back

Youth career
- 1983–1988: Gimnàstic

Senior career*
Years	Team	Apps	(Gls)
1988–1991	Gimnàstic	95	(10)
1991–1993	Real Madrid B	53	(4)
1992–1994	Real Madrid	24	(1)
1994–1996	Tenerife	60	(4)
1996–1997	Sevilla	39	(1)
1997–2001	Deportivo La Coruña	32	(1)
2000–2001	→ Racing Santander (loan)	10	(1)
2001–2002	Gimnàstic	13	(2)
2002–2003	Racing Ferrol	22	(1)
2003–2004	SS Reyes	0	(0)
2004–2005	Pegaso Tres Cantos		
2005–2006	Cobeña		
Total		348	(25)

Managerial career
- 2006–2016: Real Madrid (youth)
- 2016: Real Madrid B
- 2017: Almería
- 2018–2020: Albacete
- 2020–2023: Tenerife
- 2023–2024: Espanyol
- 2024–2026: Burgos
- 2026: Osasuna
- * Club domestic league appearances and goals

Luis Miguel Ramis Monfort (born 25 July 1970) is a Spanish former professional footballer who played mainly as a centre-back. He is currently a manager.

He amassed La Liga totals of 165 matches and eight goals over nine seasons, mainly in representation of Deportivo (three and a half years), Real Madrid and Tenerife (two apiece).

Ramis began working as a head coach in 2016, his first club being Real Madrid B.

== Playing career ==
Born in Tarragona, Catalonia, Ramis started his career with hometown club Gimnàstic de Tarragona and, already in his 20s, joined Real Madrid's reserves. In 1992–93 he managed seven La Liga appearances with the main squad, being definitely promoted the following season.

In the 1994 Iberoamerican Cup, Ramis appeared in the second leg against Boca Juniors as a substitute, in a 2–1 loss in Buenos Aires (4–3 aggregate win). Shortly after, he moved to Tenerife as part of the deal involving Fernando Redondo and, after two solid top-flight campaigns, signed with Sevilla in the same league, playing a career-best 39 matches albeit in a final relegation.

Ramis moved to firmly established Deportivo de La Coruña in 1997–98, initially acting as backup to Noureddine Naybet. After a relatively good first year, his career was severely marred by a double anterior cruciate ligament/fibula injury from which he never fully recovered; in his last professional years after leaving Depor, he totalled only 45 games as all his teams were relegated (Racing de Santander in the top division, Gimnàstic and Racing de Ferrol in the Segunda División).

== Coaching career ==
Ramis retired from the game in 2006, after three years in the Tercera División. His first steps in coaching (as assistant first) were spent in Real Madrid's youth system.

On 5 January 2016, after Zinedine Zidane was promoted to the first team following the sacking of Rafael Benítez, Ramis was appointed as head coach of Real Madrid Castilla. After failing to promote in the playoffs, he left his post by mutual consent.

Ramis became Almería's second manager of the second division season on 14 March 2017. On 12 November, after eight matches without a win, he was relieved of his duties.

On 24 June 2018, Ramis signed as manager of second-tier club Albacete. He led them to fourth place in his first season, losing 2–1 on aggregate to Mallorca in the playoff semi-finals.

On 3 February 2020, Ramis was dismissed with the team now in the relegation zone with three points from their last nine games, and following elimination from the Copa del Rey by lowly Ibiza. On 24 November, he returned to Tenerife also in the second division.

Ramis led Tete to the play-offs in 2022, where they knocked out rivals Las Palmas but lost in the final to Girona. On 22 April 2023, he announced that he would leave at the end of the season.

On 6 November 2023, Ramis was appointed manager of second-tier Espanyol in place of the sacked Luis García. He was himself dismissed the following 12 March, and took over Burgos in the same level seven months later.

On 2 June 2026, Ramos departed after he opted not to renew his contract. Eight days later, he joined Osasuna of the top flight on a two-year deal, but was fired on 12 October after collecting only one point in five fixtures.

== Managerial statistics ==
As of match played 11 October 2026

Managerial record by team and tenure
Team	Nat	From	To	Record								Ref
Team	Nat	From	To	G	W	D	L	GF	GA	GD	Win %	Ref
Real Madrid Castilla	(Spain)	5 January 2016	20 June 2016	23	14	2	7	46	30	+16	60.87	
Almería	(Spain)	14 March 2017	12 November 2017	28	10	4	14	25	34	−9	35.71	
Albacete	(Spain)	24 June 2018	3 February 2020	73	29	19	25	77	76	+1	39.73	
Tenerife	(Spain)	24 November 2020	28 May 2023	124	50	34	40	137	108	+29	40.32	
Espanyol	(Spain)	6 November 2023	12 March 2024	18	7	7	4	26	20	+6	38.89	
Burgos	(Spain)	31 October 2024	2 June 2026	77	34	19	24	83	72	+11	44.16	
Osasuna	(Spain)	10 June 2026	12 October 2026	8	2	2	4	8	18	−10	25.00	
Total				351	146	87	118	402	358	+44	41.60	—

== Honours ==
=== Player ===
- Copa del Rey: 1992–93
- Supercopa de España: 1993
- Copa Iberoamericana: 1994

Deportivo

- La Liga: 1999–2000
