= Míchel (footballer, born 1975) =

Spanish footballer and manager (born 1975)

- Míchel with Ajax in 2026

Personal information
- Full name: Miguel Ángel Sánchez Muñoz
- Date of birth: 30 October 1975 (age 51)
- Place of birth: Madrid, Spain
- Height: 1.74 m (5 ft 9 in)
- Position: Midfielder

Team information
- Current team: Ajax (head coach)

Youth career
- Rayo Vallecano

Senior career*
Years	Team	Apps	(Gls)
1992–1996	Rayo Vallecano B		
1993–2003	Rayo Vallecano	186	(31)
1997	→ Almería (loan)	18	(1)
2003–2006	Murcia	39	(4)
2005	→ Málaga (loan)	9	(0)
2006–2012	Rayo Vallecano	177	(22)
Total		429	(58)

International career
1991	Spain U16	10	(2)
1993–1994	Spain U18	17	(3)
1995	Spain U19	1	(1)
1995	Spain U20	6	(1)

Managerial career
- 2012–2017: Rayo Vallecano (youth)
- 2017–2019: Rayo Vallecano
- 2019–2021: Huesca
- 2021–2026: Girona
- 2026–: Ajax
- * Club domestic league appearances and goals

Miguel Ángel Sánchez Muñoz, known as Míchel (Spanish pronunciation: [ˈmitʃel]; born 30 October 1975), is a Spanish professional football manager and former player who played as a midfielder. He is the head coach of Eredivisie club Ajax.

In a 20-year senior career, he amassed La Liga totals of 182 matches and 25 goals, adding 169 games and 18 goals in the Segunda División and playing mostly with Rayo Vallecano (17 seasons, three spells).

As a manager, Míchel led Rayo, Huesca and Girona in both top divisions, winning promotion with all three clubs including as champions with the first two.

== Playing career ==
Míchel was born in Madrid. A product of Rayo Vallecano's youth system, he appeared once for the first team in the 1993–94 season, then alternated between them and the reserves two more years.

After a loan to Almería in the Segunda División, Míchel returned to Rayo, being essential as the capital outskirts side finished ninth in 1999–2000 and qualified for the subsequent UEFA Cup through fair play. The following campaign, he scored a career-best ten times in 33 games (all starts) as they ranked 14th; he added six goals in the UEFA Cup, in a run that ended in the quarter-finals at the hands of fellow La Liga club Alavés.

Míchel moved in 2003 to Real Murcia for a €2,7 million fee, being relatively used in his first year, which ended in top-division relegation. He appeared very rarely, however, in his final two seasons, which included a six-month loan spell with Málaga in 2004–05, where he was also sparingly used.

In July 2006, Míchel returned home and to Rayo, helping it return to the second tier in the 2007–08 season. He continued to be team captain and, during the 2010–11 campaign, still contributed two goals in 20 matches as they returned to the top flight after eight years.

== Coaching career ==
=== Rayo ===
On 9 July 2012, after having appeared in only nine games as Rayo retained their league status – just 246 minutes of action – the 36-year-old Míchel retired from football, being immediately appointed coach of his main club's youth sides. On 21 February 2017, he replaced Rubén Baraja at the helm of the main squad, debuting four days later with a 1–0 loss at neighbours Getafe via a last-minute own goal by Chechu Dorado; the side eventually achieved promotion to the top division in the 2017–18 campaign as champions.

Míchel signed a new one-year contract with the option of a second, before 2018–19 began. He was dismissed on 18 March 2019 after seven consecutive defeats left the Vallecas team six points inside the relegation zone; he was replaced by Paco Jémez in an eventual relegation.

=== Huesca ===
On 1 June 2019, Míchel was named manager of Huesca, recently demoted to the second tier. He oversaw another promotion, again in the top position.

On 12 January 2021, as the team ranked in last place, Míchel was relieved of his duties, while the season ended again in descent.

=== Girona ===
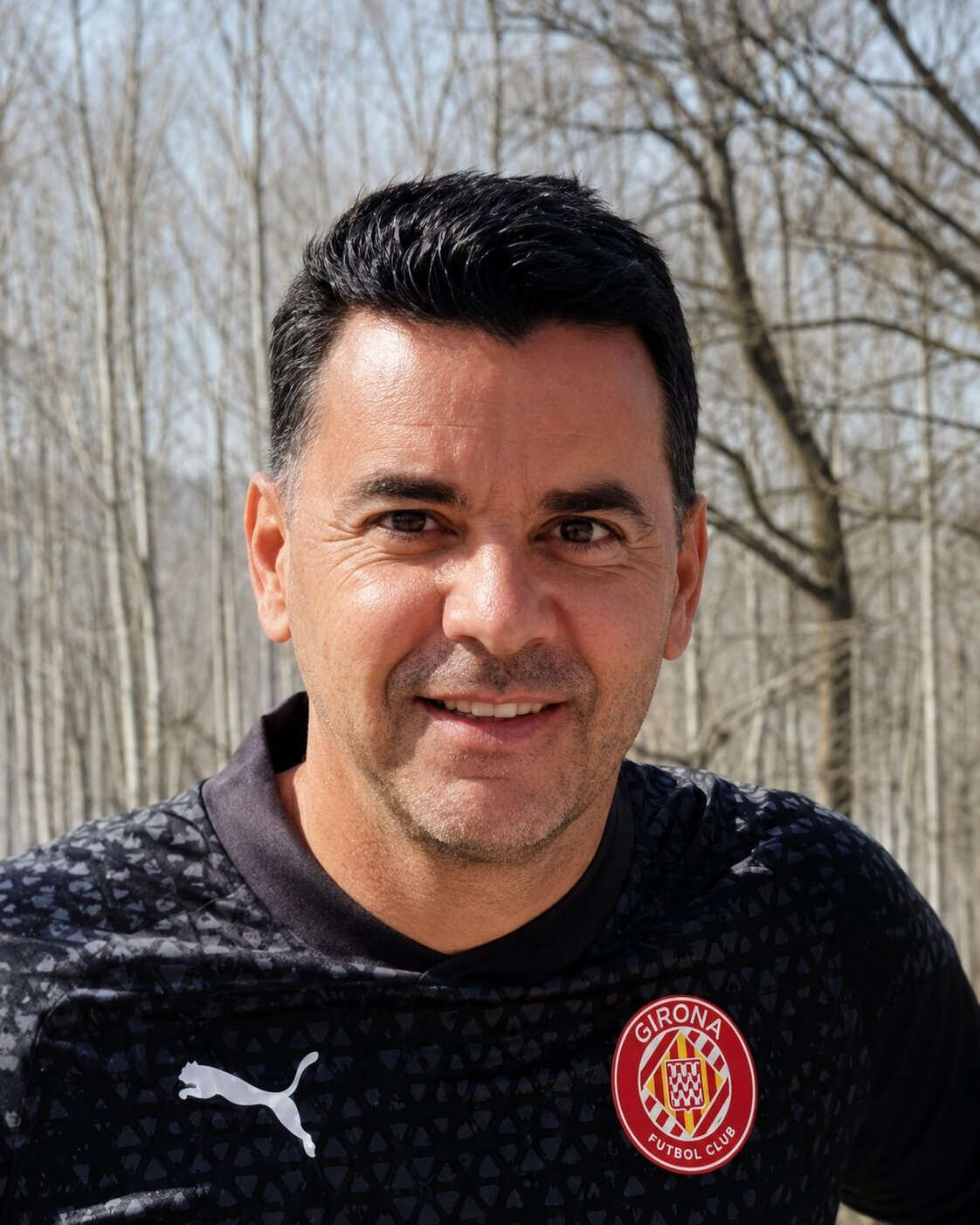
Míchel as manager of Girona in 2023

On 9 July 2021, Míchel signed as coach of Girona on a one-year deal with the option of a second year. He achieved promotion in his first season after a 3–1 win over Tenerife in the playoff final, while also making the last 16 of the Copa del Rey where the Catalans lost 2–1 at home to his former employers Rayo.

Míchel signed a new contract on 19 May 2022, while his club's promotion was still uncertain; his new deal was to 2024. They eventually achieved this in the playoffs.

Girona finished the first part of the 2023–24 season in first place, level on 48 points with Real Madrid. On 4 May 2024, he led his team to a 4–2 win over Barcelona, securing their first ever qualification for the UEFA Champions League.

On 28 May 2026, following Girona's relegation, Míchel left the Estadi Montilivi.

=== Ajax ===
On 2 June 2026, Míchel became head coach of Ajax on a two-year deal.

== Tactics ==
In his spell as Girona manager, Michel was noted for utilising a low build-up style in a 3–3–1–3 formation, with principles such as the goalkeeper playing as a center-back and a diamond midfield. He also deployed two wingers high and wide, and a striker pinning the stoppers to create space for the number-ten and inverted full-backs occupying the space left in the middle.

== Personal life ==
Míchel's sons Miguel Ángel and Álex were also footballers. Both were developed at Real Madrid.

== Managerial statistics ==
As of match played 22 November 2026

Managerial record by team and tenure
Team	Nat	From	To	Record								Ref
Team	Nat	From	To	G	W	D	L	GF	GA	GD	Win %	Ref
Rayo Vallecano	(Spain)	21 February 2017	18 March 2019	89	34	23	32	116	118	−2	38.20	
Huesca	(Spain)	1 June 2019	12 January 2021	64	24	16	24	75	76	−1	37.50	
Girona	(Spain)	9 July 2021	28 May 2026	221	91	48	82	326	290	+36	41.18	
Ajax	(Netherlands)	2 June 2026	present	22	15	5	2	66	28	+38	68.18	
Total				396	164	92	140	583	512	+71	41.41	—

== Honours ==
=== Manager ===
Rayo Vallecano

- Segunda División: 2017–18

Huesca

- Segunda División: 2019–20

Individual

- La Liga Manager of the Season: 2023–24
- Miguel Muñoz Trophy: 2019–20 Segunda División, 2023–24 La Liga
- La Liga Manager of the Month: September 2023, November 2023, January 2024, November 2024
