= Ricard Artero =

Spanish footballer

Personal information
- Full name: Ricard Artero Ruiz
- Date of birth: 5 February 2003 (age 23)
- Place of birth: La Bisbal d'Empordà, Spain
- Height: 1.81 m (5 ft 11 in)
- Position: Midfielder

Team information
- Current team: Girona
- Number: 36

Youth career
- Atlètic Bisbalenc
- Girona

Senior career*
Years	Team	Apps	(Gls)
2021–2026	Girona B	35	(2)
2021–	Girona	18	(0)

International career^{‡}
2022	Spain U19	3	(2)
- * Club domestic league appearances and goals as of 17 May 2025 ‡ National team caps and goals as of 29 March 2022

Ricard Artero Ruiz (born 5 February 2003) is a Spanish footballer who plays as a midfielder for Girona FC.

== Career ==
Born in La Bisbal d'Empordà, Girona, Catalonia, Artero represented Atlètic Bisbalenc and Girona FC as a youth. In July 2021, after finishing his formation, he signed a professional contract until 2026.

Artero made his senior debut with Girona's reserves on 5 September 2021, starting in a 2–1 Tercera División RFEF away win against CE L'Hospitalet. He made his first-team debut on 4 November, coming on as a second-half substitute for Nahuel Bustos in a 3–1 home success over AD Alcorcón in the Segunda División.

Artero made his La Liga debut on 17 February 2023, replacing Borja García late into a 6–2 home routing of UD Almería. In May, he underwent surgery due to an ankle injury, and spent the 2023–24 season recovering, only managing to feature in one match with the B's during the entire campaign.

In the following two seasons, Artero had setbacks of his ankle injury, but still renewed his contract until 2027 on 9 April 2025. He returned to a first team call-up in April 2026, but did not feature in any match as the club suffered top tier relegation.

== Career statistics ==
As of match played 23 May 2023

Appearances and goals by club, season and competition
Club	Season	League			Cup		Europe		Other		Total	
Club	Season	Division	Apps	Goals	Apps	Goals	Apps	Goals	Apps	Goals	Apps	Goals
Girona B	2021–22	Tercera Federación	35	2	—		—		—		35	2
Girona	2021–22	Segunda División	11	0	4	1	—		1 (Note: Appearance in La Liga play-offs)	0	16	1
Girona	2022–23	La Liga	7	0	1	0	—		—		8	0
Girona	2023–24	La Liga	0	0	0	0	—		—		0	0
Girona	2024–25	La Liga	0	0	0	0	0	0	—		0	0
Girona	2025–26	La Liga	0	0	0	0	—		—		0	0
Girona	Total		18	0	5	1	0	0	1	0	24	1
Career total			53	2	5	1	0	0	1	0	59	3
