= Álex Sala =

Spanish footballer

Personal information
- Full name: Álex Sala Herrero
- Date of birth: 9 April 2001 (age 25)
- Place of birth: Viladecans, Spain
- Height: 1.85 m (6 ft 1 in)
- Position: Defensive midfielder

Team information
- Current team: Mallorca (on loan from Lecce)
- Number: 7

Youth career
- 2008–2011: Viladecans
- 2011–2014: Barcelona
- 2014–2015: Cornellà
- 2015–2016: Gavà
- 2016–2018: Hospitalet
- 2019–2020: Barcelona

Senior career*
| Years | Team | Apps | (Gls) |
| 2018–2019 | Hospitalet | 6 | (0) |
| 2020–2021 | Barcelona B | 0 | (0) |
| 2021–2022 | Girona B | 25 | (0) |
| 2021–2024 | Girona | 2 | (0) |
| 2022–2023 | → Sabadell (loan) | 24 | (0) |
| 2023–2024 | → Córdoba (loan) | 29 | (2) |
| 2024–2025 | Córdoba | 38 | (5) |
| 2025– | Lecce | 9 | (0) |
| 2026– | → Mallorca (loan) | 11 | (2) |
- * Club domestic league appearances and goals as of 24 October 2026

Álex Sala Herrero (born 9 April 2001) is a Spanish professional footballer who plays as a defensive midfielder for Segunda División club Mallorca, on loan from Serie A club Lecce.

== Career ==
Born in Viladecans, Barcelona, Catalonia, Sala began his career at UD Viladecans before joining FC Barcelona's La Masia in 2011, aged ten. He left the club in 2014, and subsequently represented UE Cornellà, CF Gavà's youth setup EF Gavà and CE L'Hospitalet.

Sala made his senior debut with Hospi on 2 September 2018, coming on as a second-half substitute in a 1–0 Tercera División home win over UE Llagostera. The following 16 January, after a further five first team appearances, he returned to Barça and was assigned to the Juvenil A squad.

After finishing his formation, Sala was not registered with Barcelona's B-team for the 2020–21 campaign, and spent six months without playing before terminating his contract with the club on 5 January 2021. He subsequently moved to Girona FC, being initially assigned to the reserves in the fourth division.

Sala made his first team debut with the Blanquivermells on 14 November 2021, replacing Ibrahima Kebe late into a 2–0 Segunda División home success over FC Cartagena. The following 11 July, he renewed his contract until 2025, being promoted to the first team.

On 29 August 2022, Sala and teammate Pau Víctor were loaned out to Primera Federación side CE Sabadell FC for one year. On 11 July 2023, he moved to fellow third division side Córdoba CF also in a temporary deal.

On 2 July 2024, after helping Córdoba in their promotion to the second division, Sala signed a permanent two-year contract with the club. On 24 August of the following year, he moved abroad and joined Serie A side US Lecce on a three-year deal.

On 22 July 2026, Sala returned to Spain and its second division, after agreeing to a one-year loan deal with RCD Mallorca.

== Career statistics ==
As of match played 24 October 2026

Appearances and goals by club, season and competition
| Club | Season | League | | | Cup | | Other | | Total | |
| Club | Season | Division | Apps | Goals | Apps | Goals | Apps | Goals | Apps | Goals |
|---|---|---|---|---|---|---|---|---|---|---|
| Hospitalet | 2018–19 | Tercera División | 6 | 0 | — | | — | | 6 | 0 |
| Barcelona B | 2020–21 | Segunda División B | 0 | 0 | — | | — | | 0 | 0 |
| Girona B | 2020–21 | Tercera División | 12 | 0 | — | | 1 (Note: Appearance in 2021 Tercera División play-offs) | 0 | 13 | 0 |
| Girona B | 2021–22 | Tercera Federación | 13 | 0 | — | | 2 (Note: Appearances in 2022 Tercera División RFEF play-offs) | 0 | 15 | 0 |
| Girona B | Total | | 25 | 0 | — | | 3 | 0 | 28 | 0 |
| Girona | 2021–22 | Segunda División | 2 | 0 | — | | — | | 2 | 0 |
| Sabadell (loan) | 2022–23 | Primera Federación | 24 | 0 | — | | — | | 24 | 0 |
| Córdoba (loan) | 2023–24 | Primera Federación | 29 | 2 | — | | 4 (Note: Appearances in 2024 Primera Federación play-offs) | 0 | 33 | 2 |
| Córdoba | 2024–25 | Segunda División | 37 | 5 | 1 | 0 | — | | 38 | 5 |
| Córdoba | 2025–26 | Segunda División | 1 | 0 | — | | — | | 1 | 0 |
| Córdoba | Total | | 38 | 5 | 1 | 0 | — | | 39 | 5 |
| Lecce | 2025–26 | Serie A | 9 | 0 | 0 | 0 | — | | 9 | 0 |
| Mallorca (loan) | 2026–27 | Segunda División | 11 | 2 | 0 | 0 | — | | 11 | 2 |
| Career total | | | 144 | 9 | 1 | 0 | 7 | 0 | 152 | 9 |
