= Ramon Terrats =

Spanish footballer (born 2000)

Personal information
- Full name: Ramon Terrats Espacio
- Date of birth: 18 October 2000 (age 26)
- Place of birth: Barcelona, Spain
- Height: 1.81 m (5 ft 11 in)
- Position: Central midfielder

Team information
- Current team: Getafe
- Number: 11

Youth career
- Europa
- 2017–2019: Damm

Senior career*
| Years | Team | Apps | (Gls) |
| 2019–2020 | Sant Andreu | 17 | (0) |
| 2020 | Girona B | 7 | (1) |
| 2020–2023 | Girona | 46 | (0) |
| 2023 | → Villarreal B (loan) | 5 | (0) |
| 2023 | → Villarreal (loan) | 16 | (1) |
| 2023–2026 | Villarreal | 30 | (0) |
| 2025 | → Getafe (loan) | 15 | (4) |
| 2025–2026 | → Espanyol (loan) | 29 | (1) |
| 2026– | Getafe | 0 | (0) |

International career
| 2024– | Catalonia | 2 | (0) |
- * Club domestic league appearances and goals as of 27 May 2026

Ramon Terrats Espacio (born 18 October 2000) is a Spanish professional footballer who plays as a central midfielder for La Liga club Getafe.

== Career ==
Born in Barcelona, Catalonia, Terrats represented Europa and Damm as a youth. On 27 June 2019, after finishing his formation, he signed a one-year contract with Tercera División side UE Sant Andreu.

Terrats made his senior debut on 15 September 2019, coming on as a second-half substitute in a 1–1 home draw against Cerdanyola del Vallès. He left the club the following 22 July after being sparingly used, and signed for Girona two days later, being initially assigned to the reserves also in the fourth division.

Terrats made his first team debut for the Blanquivermells on 4 November 2020, starting in a 2–2 Segunda División away draw against Real Zaragoza. The following 24 February, he renewed his contract until 2024.

Terrats was mainly a backup option during the 2021–22 season, as his side achieved promotion to La Liga. He made his top tier debut on 14 August 2022, starting in a 1–0 loss at Valencia.

On 18 January 2023, Terrats was loaned to Villarreal B in the second division, until the end of the season. In February, however, he started to feature in the main squad under manager Quique Setién, and scored his first professional goal on 30 April, netting his team's third in a 3–1 home win over Celta Vigo.

On 30 June 2023, Terrats signed a permanent three-year contract with the Yellow Submarine, after the club exercised his buyout clause. On 3 February 2025, he was loaned to Getafe for the rest of the season.

On 1 July 2025, Terrats signed on a season-long loan Espanyol, which includes a purchase option. On 8 July of the following year, he returned to Getafe on a permanent three-year deal.

== Personal life ==
Terrats' brother Tomás is also a footballer. A goalkeeper, he also played at Europa. Terrats is also a big Espanyol fan, with his whole family also supporting them. He is a soci (member) of the club.
