= Ager Aketxe =

Spanish footballer (born 1993)

Personal information
- Full name: Ager Aketxe Barrutia
- Date of birth: 30 December 1993 (age 32)
- Place of birth: Bilbao, Spain
- Height: 1.74 m (5 ft 9 in)
- Position: Attacking midfielder

Team information
- Current team: Johor Darul Ta'zim
- Number: 47

Youth career
- 2003–2011: Athletic Bilbao

Senior career*
| Years | Team | Apps | (Gls) |
| 2011–2012 | Basconia | 33 | (9) |
| 2012–2016 | Athletic Bilbao B | 86 | (19) |
| 2014–2018 | Athletic Bilbao | 14 | (1) |
| 2017 | → Cádiz (loan) | 16 | (4) |
| 2018 | Toronto FC | 11 | (0) |
| 2018 | → Cádiz (loan) | 15 | (1) |
| 2019 | Cádiz | 18 | (3) |
| 2019–2020 | Deportivo La Coruña | 39 | (7) |
| 2020–2021 | Almería | 25 | (4) |
| 2021–2024 | Eibar | 83 | (13) |
| 2024–2025 | Zaragoza | 38 | (2) |
| 2025– | Johor Darul Ta'zim | 15 | (3) |

International career
| 2013 | Spain U20 | 4 | (0) |
- * Club domestic league appearances and goals as of 14:54, 29 September 2026 (UTC)

Ager Aketxe Barrutia (born 30 December 1993) is a Spanish professional footballer who plays as an attacking midfielder for Malaysia Super League club Johor Darul Ta'zim.

He began his career with Athletic Bilbao, going on to represent both the first and the second teams and make 34 official appearances for the former. He also competed professionally in Major League Soccer, with Toronto FC.

== Club career ==
=== Athletic Bilbao ===
Born in Bilbao, Biscay, Basque Country, Aketxe joined Athletic Bilbao's Lezama academy in 2003, aged 9. He made his senior debut with the feeder club CD Basconia in 2011, in the Tercera División.

In May 2012, Aketxe was promoted to the second team. He featured regularly for the side, playing all Segunda División B games in his second season.

On 2 September 2014, Aketxe was promoted to the main squad in La Liga, being assigned number 23 jersey. He appeared in his first match as a professional on 17 September, coming on as a substitute for Iker Muniain in the 75th minute of a 0–0 home draw against FC Shakhtar Donetsk in the group stage of the UEFA Champions League; however, he sustained a foot injury which put him out of action for six weeks.

Aketxe scored his only goal in the Spanish top flight on 17 May 2015, his team's first in a 3–2 away win against Elche CF as Athletic came from behind 2–0. In the beginning of 2016, he was moved down back to the B side to help them avoid relegation from Segunda División and gain some minutes. On 27 February, he netted a hat-trick in a 4–2 home victory over SD Ponferradina, but they eventually finished in 22nd and last position in spite of his eight goals.

On 31 January 2017, after making no appearances during the first half of the campaign due to recovering from a serious knee injury, Aketxe was loaned to Cádiz CF in the second tier until June. On 16 February 2018, Athletic cancelled his contract with immediate effect (retaining the right to re-sign him in the following years) to allow him to negotiate a move abroad.

=== Toronto FC ===
Aketxe signed with Major League Soccer side Toronto FC on 23 February 2018, with Athletic holding a buy-back option at the conclusion of his contract. He made his debut four days later, coming on as a second-half substitute in a 0–0 home draw against Colorado Rapids in the second leg of the round of 16 of the CONCACAF Champions League. His first start came on 3 March in the opening match of the season, a 2–0 home defeat to Columbus Crew SC.

=== Cádiz ===
On 11 July 2018, Aketxe returned to Cádiz after agreeing to a six-month loan with an option to purchase. In November, Toronto and player terminated the remaining term on their contract "by mutual consent".

After cutting ties with the Canadian club, Athletic Bilbao did not exercise their buyback option and Aketxe's original loan with Cádiz became an official deal, expiring on 30 June 2019.

=== Deportivo ===
On 13 July 2019, free agent Aketxe joined fellow second division side Deportivo de La Coruña on a one-year deal, where he was given the number 10 shirt. He scored a goal on his official debut on 18 August, in a 3–2 home victory over Real Oviedo.

=== Almería ===
On 7 September 2020, after being relegated, Aketxe agreed to a two-year contract with UD Almería in the same league. He again scored in his first appearance, helping to a 2–0 away win against CD Lugo.

=== Eibar ===
On 27 July 2021, Aketxe signed a two-year deal with SD Eibar, recently relegated to the second tier; in July 2023, he extended it until the summer of 2024. He netted a career-best 11 times during that campaign.

=== Zaragoza ===
On 7 August 2024, Aketxe joined Real Zaragoza on a two-year contract on a free transfer. He scored once again in his league bow, in the 4–0 victory at Cádiz.

=== Later career ===
On 31 August 2025, Aketxe moved to the Malaysia Super League on a contract at Johor Darul Ta'zim FC.

== Personal life ==
Aketxe's older brother, Isaac, was also a footballer; he too was developed at Athletic Bilbao's youth setup. Their father, known as Isaac Aqueche due to spelling conventions of the time, played as a midfielder in the lower divisions of Spanish football including a spell with Athletic's reserves.

In May 2016, Aketxe and two others were put on trial for having caused minor injuries to an off-duty ertzaina the previous August during a local festival in his place of residence, the Getxo neighbourhood of Romo.

== Career statistics ==
As of 12 June 2024

Appearances and goals by club, season and competition
| Club | Season | League | | | National cup | | Continental | | Other | | Total | |
| Club | Season | Division | Apps | Goals | Apps | Goals | Apps | Goals | Apps | Goals | Apps | Goals |
|---|---|---|---|---|---|---|---|---|---|---|---|---|
| Basconia | 2011–12 | Tercera División | 33 | 9 | — | | — | | — | | 33 | 9 |
| Athletic Bilbao B | 2012–13 | Segunda División B | 27 | 5 | — | | — | | 3 (Note: Appearances in Segunda División B play-offs) | 0 | 30 | 5 |
| Athletic Bilbao B | 2013–14 | Segunda División B | 38 | 6 | — | | — | | — | | 38 | 6 |
| Athletic Bilbao B | 2015–16 | Segunda División | 21 | 8 | — | | — | | — | | 21 | 8 |
| Athletic Bilbao B | Total | | 86 | 19 | 0 | 0 | 0 | 0 | 3 | 0 | 89 | 19 |
| Athletic Bilbao | 2014–15 | La Liga | 8 | 1 | 3 | 0 | 1 (Note: Appearance in UEFA Champions League) | 0 | — | | 12 | 0 |
| Athletic Bilbao | 2015–16 | La Liga | 3 | 0 | 1 | 0 | 6 (Note: Appearances in UEFA Europa League) | 0 | — | | 10 | 0 |
| Athletic Bilbao | 2017–18 | La Liga | 3 | 0 | 2 | 0 | 7 | 0 | — | | 12 | 0 |
| Athletic Bilbao | Total | | 14 | 1 | 6 | 0 | 14 | 0 | 0 | 0 | 34 | 1 |
| Cádiz (loan) | 2016–17 | Segunda División | 16 | 4 | 0 | 0 | — | | 2 (Note: Appearances in La Liga play-offs) | 1 | 18 | 5 |
| Toronto FC | 2018 | Major League Soccer | 11 | 0 | 0 | 0 | 3 (Note: Appearances in CONCACAF Champions League) | 0 | — | | 14 | 0 |
| Cádiz (loan) | 2018–19 | Segunda División | 15 | 1 | 2 | 0 | — | | — | | 17 | 1 |
| Cádiz | 2018–19 | Segunda División | 18 | 3 | 0 | 0 | — | | — | | 18 | 3 |
| Deportivo | 2019–20 | Segunda División | 39 | 7 | 2 | 0 | — | | — | | 41 | 7 |
| Almería | 2020–21 | Segunda División | 25 | 4 | 2 | 2 | — | | 2 | 0 | 29 | 6 |
| Eibar | 2021–22 | Segunda División | 22 | 0 | 2 | 0 | — | | 2 | 1 | 26 | 1 |
| Eibar | 2022–23 | Segunda División | 21 | 2 | 1 | 0 | — | | 2 | 0 | 24 | 2 |
| Eibar | 2023–24 | Segunda División | 40 | 11 | 2 | 2 | — | | 2 | 0 | 44 | 13 |
| Eibar | Total | | 83 | 13 | 5 | 2 | 0 | 0 | 6 | 1 | 94 | 16 |
| Career total | | | 340 | 61 | 17 | 4 | 17 | 0 | 13 | 2 | 387 | 67 |

== Honours ==
Athletic Bilbao

- Supercopa de España: 2015
