= Eric Monjonell =

Spanish footballer

Personal information
- Full name: Eric Monjonell Torras
- Date of birth: 6 December 2001 (age 24)
- Place of birth: Sant Antoni de Vilamajor, Spain
- Height: 1.87 m (6 ft 2 in)
- Position: Centre-back

Team information
- Current team: Ibiza
- Number: 4

Youth career
- Argentona
- 2016–2017: Vilassar Mar
- 2017–2018: Badalona
- 2018–2019: Mataró
- 2019–2020: Girona

Senior career*
Years	Team	Apps	(Gls)
2020–2024	Girona B	46	(5)
2020–2024	Girona	1	(0)
2022–2023	→ Lommel (loan)	17	(1)
2024–	Ibiza	57	(2)
- * Club domestic league appearances and goals as of 10 June 2026

Eric Monjonell Torras (born 6 December 2001) is a Spanish footballer who plays as a central defender for Ibiza.

== Career ==
Born in Sant Antoni de Vilamajor, Barcelona, Catalonia, Monjonell represented FC Argentona, CF Badalona, CE Mataró and Girona FC as a youth. In June 2020, after finishing his formation, he was promoted to the latter's B-team in Tercera División.

Monjonell made his senior debut on 18 October 2020, starting in a 3–0 away win against UE Figueres. He made his first team debut on 4 November, coming on as a late substitute for fellow youth graduate Gerard Gumbau in a 2–2 Segunda División away draw against Real Zaragoza.

On 31 August 2022, Monjonell renewed his contract until 2025 and was immediately loaned to Belgian side Lommel S.K. for the season.

On 1 February 2024, Monjonell transferred to Primera Federación club Ibiza.
