= Juan Carlos (footballer, born 1988) =

Spanish footballer

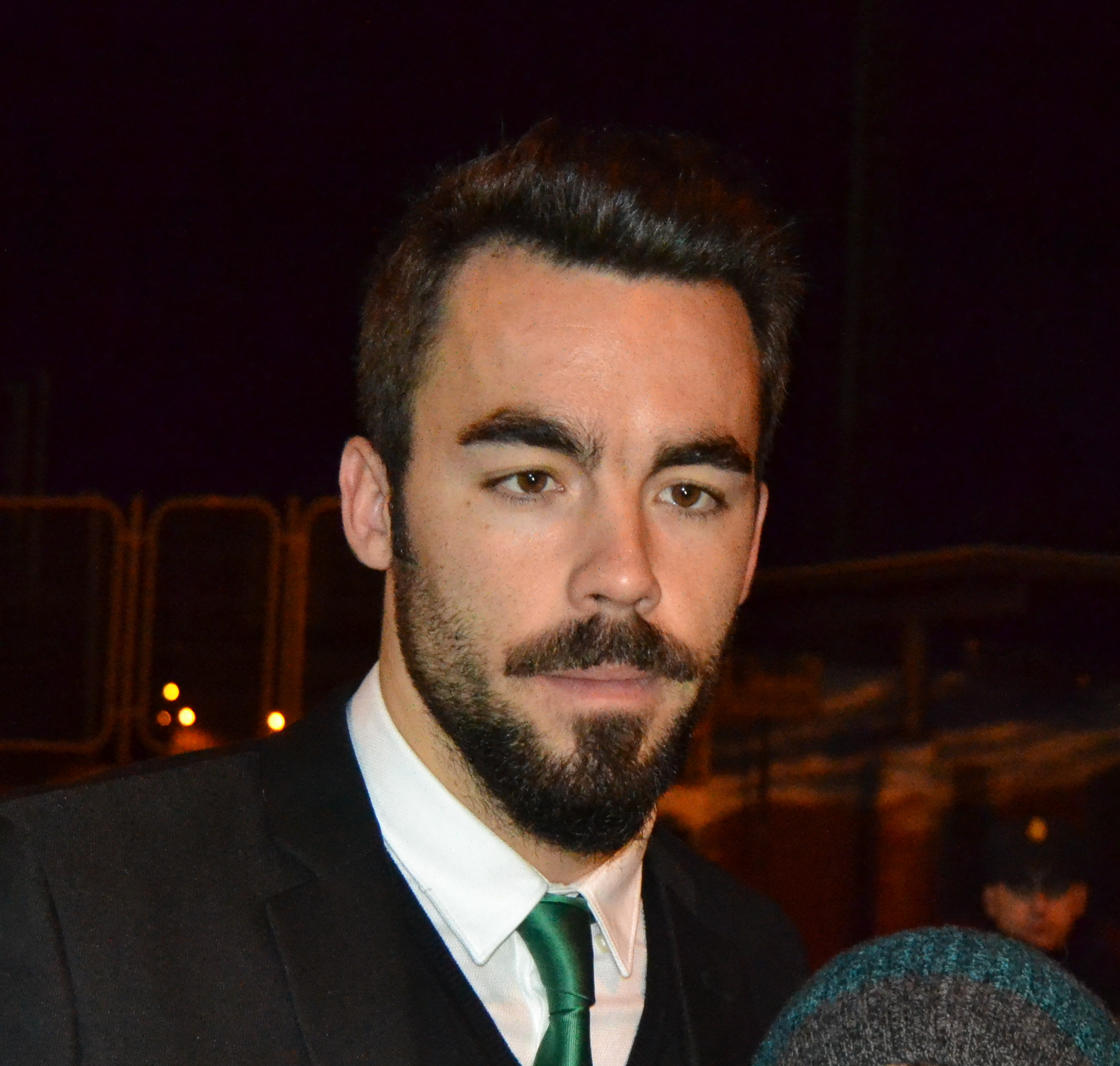
- Juan Carlos in 2015

Personal information
- Full name: Juan Carlos Martín Corral
- Date of birth: 20 January 1988 (age 38)
- Place of birth: Guadalajara, Spain
- Height: 1.86 m (6 ft 1 in)
- Position: Goalkeeper

Youth career
- 2000–2005: Guadalajara
- 2005–2007: Rayo Vallecano

Senior career*
Years	Team	Apps	(Gls)
2005	Guadalajara	5	(0)
2007–2011	Rayo Vallecano B	147	(0)
2011	Rayo Vallecano	1	(0)
2011–2013	Hércules	9	(0)
2013–2015	Córdoba	43	(0)
2015–2016	Rayo Vallecano	21	(0)
2016–2017	Elche	40	(0)
2017–2019	Lugo	78	(1)
2019–2026	Girona	109	(0)
- * Club domestic league appearances and goals as of 21:13, 3 November 2022 (UTC)

Juan Carlos Martín Corral (born 20 January 1988), known as Juan Carlos (Spanish pronunciation: [xwaŋ ˈkaɾlos]), (Note: In isolation, Juan is pronounced [xwan].) is a Spanish professional footballer who plays as a goalkeeper.

== Club career ==
Born in Guadalajara, Castilla–La Mancha, Juan Carlos made his senior debut with CD Guadalajara in the 2004–05 season, in the Tercera División. He joined Rayo Vallecano on 26 July 2005, returning to youth football.

Juan Carlos was promoted to the reserves in summer 2007, and appeared regularly with the side in the fourth tier and Segunda División B. He played his first match as a professional on 4 June 2011, starting in a 2–3 Segunda División home loss against FC Barcelona B.

On 4 July 2011, having been deemed surplus to requirements, Juan Carlos moved to Hércules CF also in division two. On 2 July 2013, he signed for Córdoba CF after rejecting a contract extension.

Juan Carlos appeared in 15 matches in his debut season, as the Andalusians returned to La Liga after a 42-year absence. He made his debut in the competition on 25 August 2014, starting in a 2–0 away defeat to Real Madrid.

Juan Carlos returned to his first club Rayo on 6 August 2015, agreeing to a two-year deal. In July 2016, after suffering top-flight relegation, he signed a two-year contract with Elche CF.

On 28 June 2017, following another relegation, Juan Carlos signed a two-year deal at CD Lugo still in the second tier. On 20 January 2018, the day of his 30th birthday, he scored with a kick from his own half in the 3–1 home win over Sporting de Gijón.

On 25 June 2019, Juan Carlos signed a two-year contract with Girona FC, recently relegated to the second division. In June 2025, having been first-choice for the better part of his first three seasons and key to top-flight promotion in 2022, the 37-year-old renewed his link at the Estadi Montilivi for a further year; two months later, however, he suffered a serious knee injury, being eventually left without a squad number.

== Career statistics ==
As of match played 30 October 2024

Appearances and goals by club, season and competition
Club	Season	League			Cup		Continental		Other		Total	
Club	Season	Division	Apps	Goals	Apps	Goals	Apps	Goals	Apps	Goals	Apps	Goals
Rayo Vallecano B	2010–11	Segunda División B	34	0	—		—		—		34	0
Rayo Vallecano	2010–11	Segunda División	1	0	1	0	—		—		2	0
Hércules	2011–12	Segunda División	4	0	1	0	—		2 (Note: Appearances in La Liga play-offs)	0	7	0
Hércules	2012–13	Segunda División	5	0	1	0	—		—		6	0
Hércules	Total		9	0	2	0	—		2	0	13	0
Córdoba	2013–14	Segunda División	11	0	1	0	—		4	0	16	0
Córdoba	2014–15	La Liga	32	0	0	0	—		—		32	0
Córdoba	Total		43	0	1	0	—		4	0	48	0
Rayo Vallecano	2015–16	La Liga	21	0	2	0	—		—		23	0
Elche	2016–17	Segunda División	40	0	0	0	—		—		40	0
Lugo	2017–18	Segunda División	38	1	0	0	—		—		38	1
Lugo	2018–19	Segunda División	40	0	—		—		—		40	0
Lugo	Total		78	1	0	0	—		—		78	1
Girona	2019–20	Segunda División	21	0	1	0	—		0	0	22	0
Girona	2020–21	Segunda División	40	0	0	0	—		4	0	44	0
Girona	2021–22	Segunda División	38	0	2	0	—		4	0	44	0
Girona	2022–23	La Liga	10	0	1	0	—		—		11	0
Girona	2023–24	La Liga	0	0	3	0	—		—		3	0
Girona	2024–25	La Liga	0	0	1	0	—		—		1	0
Girona	2025–26	La Liga	0	0	0	0	—		—		0	0
Girona	Total		109	0	8	0	0	0	8	0	125	0
Career total			335	1	14	0	0	0	14	0	363	1
