= 2021–22 Segunda División =

91st season of the second-tier football league in Spain

Segunda División
- Season: 2021–22
- Dates: 13 August 2021 – 19 June 2022
- Champions: Almería; 1st title
- Promoted: Almería; Valladolid; Girona
- Relegated: Amorebieta; Real Sociedad B Fuenlabrada; Alcorcón
- Matches: 462
- Goals: 1,122 (2.43 per match)
- Top goalscorer: Borja Bastón; Cristhian Stuani (22 goals each)
- Biggest home win: Cartagena 5–0 Amorebieta (21 May 2022)
- Biggest away win: Málaga 0–5 Ibiza (23 January 2022)
- Highest scoring: Ibiza 6–2 Alcorcón (8 January 2022)
- Longest winning run: Almería; 7 matches
- Longest unbeaten run: Zaragoza; 13 matches
- Longest winless run: Alcorcón; 21 matches
- Longest losing run: Fuenlabrada; 7 losses
- Highest attendance: 30063; Las Palmas 2–1 Oviedo (21 May 2022)
- Lowest attendance: 592; Amorebieta 2–1 Almería (29 August 2021)

The 2021–22 Segunda División (known as LaLiga SmartBank for sponsorship reasons) football season, was the 91st since its establishment in Spain.

== Teams ==
=== Team changes ===
Promoted from 2020–21 Segunda División B	Relegated from 2020–21 La Liga	Promoted to 2021–22 La Liga	Relegated to 2021–22 Primera División RFEF
Burgos; Real Sociedad B Amorebieta; Ibiza	Huesca; Valladolid; Eibar	Espanyol; Mallorca; Rayo Vallecano	Albacete; Castellón; UD Logroñés; Sabadell

=== Promotion and relegation (pre-season) ===
A total of 22 teams will contest the league, including 15 sides from the 2020–21 season, three relegated from the 2020–21 La Liga, and four promoted from the 2020–21 Segunda División B. This will include the winners of the play-offs.

Teams promoted to La Liga

On 8 May 2021, Espanyol became the first side to mathematically be promoted, assured of a return to the top flight following a 0–0 draw against Zaragoza. The second team to earn promotion was Mallorca, following Almería's 2–3 loss to Cartagena on 18 May 2021. Both teams made an immediate return to the first division after a season away. The final team promoted to La Liga was Rayo Vallecano by beating CD Leganés 5-1 and Girona FC 3–2 on aggration in promotion play-off.

Teams relegated from La Liga

The first team to be relegated from La Liga were Eibar, after a 1–4 loss to Valencia on 16 May 2021, ending their seven-year stay in the top tier. The second team to be relegated were Valladolid, following a 1–2 home defeat against Atlético Madrid on 22 May 2021, in their final game of the season, ending their three-year stay in the top tier. The third and final team to be relegated were Huesca, after drawing 0–0 against Valencia on 22 May 2021 in their final game of the season, suffering an immediate return to the second division.

Teams relegated to Primera División RFEF

The first team to be relegated from Segunda División were Albacete, following a 1–1 against Lugo on 18 May 2021, effectively ending their four-years stay in the second tier. Albacete was followed by Castellón, Logroñés and Sabadell. The three of those clubs were relegated on 30 May 2021, making an immediate return to the third tier after a single season in Segunda División.

Teams promoted from Segunda División B

Following the play-offs, the first team to achieve promotion were Real Sociedad B after defeated Algeciras on 22 May 2021. They are promoted to second division for the first time in 59 years. The second team to earn promotion were Amorebieta on 22 May 2021 after beating Badajoz. The third team to earn promotion were Ibiza on 23 May 2021, after defeated UCAM Murcia. For both victorious teams this was their first time ever promotion to the second division. The fourth and last team to get the promotion was Burgos after defeating Athletic Bilbao B on 23 May 2021. This was their 2nd promotion to the Segunda División, the last one being in 2001–02, where they ended being relegated.

=== Stadiums and locations ===
Location of teams in 2021–22 Segunda División
Location of Community of Madrid teams in 2021–22 Segunda División
Location of teams in 2021–22 Segunda División (Canary Islands)

Team	Location	Stadium	Capacity
Alcorcón	Alcorcón	Santo Domingo	5,100
Almería	Almería	Juegos Mediterráneos	15,000
Amorebieta	Amorebieta-Etxano	Lezama (field 2) (Note: On 17 June 2021, Amorebieta reached an agreement with Athletic Bilbao to play at Lezama, since their home ground, Urritxe, was deemed "impractical" to play in the category.)	3,250
Burgos	Burgos	El Plantío	12,194
Cartagena	Cartagena	Cartagonova	15,105
Eibar	Eibar	Ipurua	8,164
Fuenlabrada	Fuenlabrada	Fernando Torres	5,400
Girona	Girona	Montilivi	11,200
Huesca	Huesca	El Alcoraz	7,638
Ibiza	Ibiza	Can Misses	4,500
Las Palmas	Las Palmas	Gran Canaria	31,250
Leganés	Leganés	Butarque	12,450
Lugo	Lugo	Anxo Carro	7,070
Málaga	Málaga	La Rosaleda	30,044
Mirandés	Miranda de Ebro	Anduva	5,759
Oviedo	Oviedo	Carlos Tartiere	30,500
Ponferradina	Ponferrada	El Toralín	8,400
Real Sociedad B	San Sebastián	Anoeta	40,000
Sporting Gijón	Gijón	El Molinón	30,000
Tenerife	Santa Cruz de Tenerife	Heliodoro Rodríguez López	22,824
Valladolid	Valladolid	José Zorrilla	28,012
Zaragoza	Zaragoza	La Romareda	33,608

=== Personnel and sponsorship ===
Team	Manager	Captain	Kit manufacturer	Shirt main sponsor
Alcorcón	(Spain) Fran Fernández	(Spain) Laure	Kappa	Eneryeti Energy Drink
Almería	(Spain) Rubi	(Spain) Fernando	Puma	Arabian Centres
Amorebieta	(Spain) Haritz Mújika	(Spain) Iker Seguín	Kappa	Sidenor
Burgos	(Spain) Julián Calero	(Spain) Eneko Undabarrena	Adidas	Reale Seguros
Cartagena	(Spain) Luis Carrión	(Spain) Alberto de la Bella	Adidas	Talasur Group
Eibar	(Spain) Gaizka Garitano	(Spain) Anaitz Arbilla	Joma	
Fuenlabrada	(Spain) José Ramón Sandoval	(Spain) Juanma Marrero	Joma	Grupo Avimosa
Girona	(Spain) Míchel	(Spain) Aday	Puma	Gosbi
Huesca	(Spain) Xisco Muñoz	(Spain) Jorge Pulido	Nike	Huesca La Magia
Ibiza	(Spain) Paco Jémez	(Spain) Fran Grima	Nike	Power Electronics
Las Palmas	(Spain) García Pimienta	(Spain) Maikel Mesa	Hummel	Gran Canaria
Leganés	(Tunisia) Mehdi Nafti	(Spain) Unai Bustinza	Joma	Urbas Grupo Financiero
Lugo	(Spain) Rubén Albés	(Spain) Carlos Pita	Kappa	Estrella Galicia
Málaga	(Argentina) Pablo Guede	(Spain) Ismael Casas	Nike	Sabor a Málaga
Mirandés	(Spain) Joseba Etxeberria	(Spain) Raúl Lizoain	Adidas	Miranda Empresas
Oviedo	(Spain) José Ángel Ziganda	(Spain) Bolaño	Adidas	Digi Communications
Ponferradina	(Spain) Bolo	(Brazil) Yuri	Adidas	Herrero Brigantina
Real Sociedad B	(Spain) Xabi Alonso	(Spain) Roberto López	Macron	Kutxabank
Sporting Gijón	(Spain) Abelardo	(Spain) Pablo Pérez	Nike	Integra Energía, William Hill, Alimerka, Nissan
Tenerife	(Spain) Luis Miguel Ramis	(Spain) Aitor Sanz	Hummel	Turismo Tenerife
Valladolid	(Spain) Pacheta	(Spain) Jordi Masip	Adidas	Estrella Galicia
Zaragoza	(Spain) Juan Ignacio Martínez	(Spain) Alberto Zapater	Adidas	Green Botanic Pharmacie

=== Managerial changes ===
Team	Outgoing manager	Manner of departure	Date of vacancy	Position in table	Incoming manager	Date of appointment
Valladolid	(Spain) Sergio González	Sacked	23 May 2021	Pre-season	(Spain) Pacheta	16 June 2021
Eibar	(Spain) José Luis Mendilibar	Mutual consent	25 May 2021	Pre-season	(Spain) Gaizka Garitano	7 June 2021
Huesca	(Spain) Pacheta	Mutual consent	25 May 2021	Pre-season	(Mexico) Ignacio Ambriz	28 June 2021
Málaga	(Spain) Sergio Pellicer	Resigned	31 May 2021	Pre-season	(Spain) José Alberto	1 June 2021
Mirandés	(Spain) José Alberto	Signed for Málaga	1 June 2021	Pre-season	(Spain) Lolo Escobar	4 June 2021
Girona	(Spain) Francisco	Mutual consent	30 June 2021	Pre-season	(Spain) Míchel	9 July 2021
Alcorcón	(Spain) Juan Antonio Anquela	Sacked	18 September 2021	22nd	(Spain) Jorge Romero	18 September 2021
Huesca	(Mexico) Ignacio Ambriz	Sacked	25 October 2021	12th	(Spain) Xisco Muñoz	27 October 2021
Leganés	(Spain) Asier Garitano	Sacked	30 October 2021	20th	(Tunisia) Mehdi Nafti	31 October 2021
Alcorcón	(Spain) Jorge Romero	Sacked	2 November 2021	22nd	(Spain) Fran Fernández	2 November 2021
Fuenlabrada	(Spain) José Luis Oltra	Sacked	14 December 2021	19th	(Spain) Sergio Pellicer	15 December 2021
Ibiza	(Spain) Juan Carlos Carcedo	Sacked	18 December 2021	16th	(Spain) Paco Jémez	26 December 2021
Las Palmas	(Spain) Pepe Mel	Sacked	23 January 2022	7th	(Spain) García Pimienta	24 January 2022
Málaga	(Spain) José Alberto	Sacked	25 January 2022	14th	(Spain) Natxo González	27 January 2022
Mirandés	(Spain) Lolo Escobar	Sacked	13 February 2022	17th	(Spain) Joseba Etxeberria	14 February 2022
Sporting Gijón	(Spain) David Gallego	Sacked	22 February 2022	15th	(Spain) José Luis Martí	23 February 2022
Fuenlabrada	(Spain) Sergio Pellicer	Sacked	6 March 2022	20th	(Spain) José Ramón Sandoval	7 March 2022
Amorebieta	(Spain) Iñigo Vélez	Sacked	8 March 2022	20th	(Spain) Haritz Mújika	8 March 2022
Málaga	(Spain) Natxo González	Sacked	2 April 2022	18th	(Argentina) Pablo Guede	2 April 2022
Sporting Gijón	(Spain) José Luis Martí	Sacked	3 May 2022	17th	(Spain) Abelardo	3 May 2022

== League table ==
=== Standings ===
Pos	Team	Pld	W	D	L	GF	GA	GD	Pts	Qualification or relegation
1	Almería (C, P)	42	24	9	9	68	35	+33	81 (Note: Almería finished ahead of Valladolid on head-to-head points: Almería 3–1 Valladolid, Valladolid 2–2 Almería.)	Promotion to La Liga
2	Valladolid (P)	42	24	9	9	71	43	+28	81	Promotion to La Liga
3	Eibar	42	23	11	8	61	45	+16	80	Qualification for promotion play-offs
4	Las Palmas	42	19	13	10	57	47	+10	70	Qualification for promotion play-offs
5	Tenerife	42	20	9	13	53	37	+16	69	Qualification for promotion play-offs
6	Girona (O, P)	42	20	8	14	57	42	+15	68 (Note: Girona finished ahead of Oviedo on head-to-head points: Girona 2–1 Oviedo, Oviedo 0–0 Girona.)	Qualification for promotion play-offs
7	Oviedo	42	17	17	8	57	41	+16	68	
8	Ponferradina	42	17	12	13	57	55	+2	63	
9	Cartagena	42	18	6	18	63	57	+6	60	
10	Zaragoza	42	12	20	10	39	46	−7	56	
11	Burgos	42	15	10	17	41	41	0	55	
12	Leganés	42	13	15	14	50	51	−1	54 (Note: Leganés finished ahead of Huesca on head-to-head points: Leganés 2–1 Huesca, Huesca 0–2 Leganés.)	
13	Huesca	42	13	15	14	49	44	+5	54	
14	Mirandés	42	15	7	20	58	62	−4	52 (Note: Mirandés finished ahead of Ibiza on head-to-head points: Mirandés 4–0 Ibiza, Ibiza 0–2 Mirandés.)	
15	Ibiza	42	12	16	14	53	59	−6	52	
16	Lugo	42	10	20	12	46	52	−6	50	
17	Sporting Gijón	42	11	13	18	43	48	−5	46	
18	Málaga	42	11	12	19	36	57	−21	45	
19	Amorebieta (R)	42	9	16	17	44	63	−19	43	Relegation to Primera Federación
20	Real Sociedad B (R)	42	10	10	22	43	61	−18	40	Relegation to Primera Federación
21	Fuenlabrada (R)	42	6	15	21	39	65	−26	33	Relegation to Primera Federación
22	Alcorcón (R)	42	6	11	25	37	71	−34	29	Relegation to Primera Federación

Source: LaLiga SmartBank
Rules for classification: 1) points; 2) head-to-head points; 3) head-to-head goal difference; 4) goal difference; 5) number of goals scored
(C) Champions; (O) Play-off winners; (P) Promoted; (R) Relegated

=== Results ===
Home \ Away	ALC	ALM	AMO	BUR	CAR	EIB	FUE	GIR	HUE	IBI	LPA	LEG	LUG	MGA	MIR	OVI	PON	RSO	SPO	TFE	VLD	ZAR
Alcorcón	—	0–4	2–2	1–0	1–1	1–0	0–2	0–1	1–0	0–2	0–2	3–3	1–1	0–1	0–0	1–2	2–2	1–4	1–1	0–2	1–2	1–2
Almería	1–1	—	3–0	2–0	0–1	0–2	3–1	0–1	0–0	2–0	1–1	1–0	3–3	2–0	2–1	2–1	3–0	3–1	1–0	3–1	3–1	3–0
Amorebieta	0–0	2–1	—	2–2	2–3	1–1	2–1	1–0	1–0	3–1	1–1	1–3	1–3	1–2	1–0	1–1	1–0	1–2	1–1	1–1	4–1	1–1
Burgos	3–1	0–2	2–2	—	1–1	0–1	2–0	0–0	3–1	2–1	0–0	4–0	1–1	3–0	1–0	0–1	1–0	0–0	0–0	1–0	3–0	0–1
Cartagena	3–1	1–3	5–0	1–0	—	4–1	3–0	3–0	0–3	5–1	0–2	0–0	2–1	3–1	3–0	1–2	0–1	1–0	1–0	1–1	2–3	3–0
Eibar	2–1	1–0	1–0	2–0	2–1	—	0–0	4–2	2–1	3–1	2–2	1–1	1–0	2–2	1–1	1–0	0–1	3–2	3–2	2–0	0–2	2–0
Fuenlabrada	2–2	1–1	0–0	1–2	2–1	0–0	—	1–2	2–3	1–2	3–2	2–1	1–1	1–0	1–1	0–0	2–3	1–2	0–0	1–2	0–0	1–1
Girona	3–1	1–2	2–0	3–1	2–0	0–1	2–1	—	1–3	5–1	0–0	3–0	1–1	1–0	2–0	2–1	3–0	2–0	1–2	0–1	1–0	1–1
Huesca	0–0	1–1	1–1	1–0	2–0	2–0	0–0	0–1	—	0–0	0–0	0–2	1–0	0–0	4–0	1–2	1–2	3–2	1–1	1–2	3–2	1–1
Ibiza	6–2	0–1	1–1	2–0	2–1	2–0	3–1	1–1	2–1	—	1–1	1–1	1–1	2–2	0–2	1–1	0–1	2–2	0–2	0–0	1–2	2–2
Las Palmas	3–0	1–1	1–0	0–2	4–1	0–1	2–1	1–3	2–1	1–1	—	4–2	2–2	2–1	1–0	2–1	2–1	0–0	1–0	2–1	1–1	2–3
Leganés	1–0	2–2	1–0	0–0	1–1	2–3	3–2	1–1	2–1	1–2	4–1	—	1–1	0–3	2–0	0–0	1–1	1–1	1–1	1–2	0–2	2–1
Lugo	1–0	2–1	1–1	1–0	1–0	2–2	1–3	1–0	3–2	0–0	2–0	0–0	—	1–0	2–1	1–1	1–2	0–0	1–1	0–2	0–2	1–1
Málaga	1–0	0–1	1–2	0–1	1–1	1–3	1–0	2–0	0–2	0–5	2–1	0–2	1–0	—	0–0	0–0	0–0	2–1	2–2	1–0	2–2	1–1
Mirandés	1–3	1–4	2–0	3–1	2–1	3–3	5–1	1–2	0–1	4–0	4–2	1–2	3–2	3–0	—	1–1	3–1	2–0	0–3	2–1	0–1	2–0
Oviedo	3–1	2–0	2–0	1–3	2–0	1–1	3–0	0–0	3–3	3–2	1–1	1–0	2–2	2–1	3–0	—	2–0	0–1	1–1	0–0	3–0	3–3
Ponferradina	1–0	1–0	1–1	3–1	4–2	2–2	0–0	2–1	1–1	1–1	1–2	0–3	3–1	4–0	2–1	1–2	—	3–2	4–1	1–2	2–2	0–0
Real Sociedad B	2–4	0–2	2–1	0–1	1–2	2–3	0–0	1–2	0–2	0–1	0–1	1–0	1–1	2–0	1–3	1–1	1–1	—	2–1	1–2	0–2	1–2
Sporting Gijón	1–0	0–1	2–1	1–0	4–1	0–1	1–1	2–1	1–1	0–1	0–1	2–1	1–1	2–1	2–1	0–1	2–3	0–1	—	1–2	1–2	1–2
Tenerife	1–0	0–1	2–1	4–0	1–2	0–1	3–1	2–1	0–0	2–0	0–1	0–0	1–1	0–2	1–2	4–0	2–0	2–0	0–0	—	1–4	1–1
Valladolid	2–0	2–2	5–1	1–0	2–0	2–0	3–0	2–2	3–0	1–1	0–1	1–0	4–1	1–1	3–1	2–1	2–0	1–2	1–0	0–2	—	2–0
Zaragoza	0–3	2–0	1–1	0–0	0–1	1–0	2–1	1–0	0–0	0–0	2–1	0–2	1–0	1–1	1–1	0–0	1–1	1–1	2–0	0–2	0–0	—

Source: LaLiga
Legend: Blue = home team win; Yellow = draw; Red = away team win.

=== Positions by round ===
The table lists the positions of teams after each week of matches. In order to preserve chronological evolvements, any postponed matches are not included to the round at which they were originally scheduled, but added to the full round they were played immediately afterwards.

Team ╲ Round	1	2	3	4	5	6	7	8	9	10	11	12	13	14	15	16	17	18	19	20	21	22	23	24	25	26	27	28	29	30	31	32	33	34	35	36	37	38	39	40	41	42
Almería	1	2	5	2	4	3	2	1	1	2	1	1	1	1	1	1	1	1	1	1	1	1	1	2	3	2	2	2	2	2	2	2	2	3	2	2	2	2	1	1	2	1
Valladolid	11	4	2	6	9	15	12	9	9	7	8	7	5	6	6	3	5	5	5	5	5	3	2	3	2	3	3	3	3	3	3	3	3	2	3	3	3	3	3	3	3	2
Eibar	21	20	14	18	10	6	6	5	5	4	2	2	2	2	2	2	2	2	3	3	2	2	3	1	1	1	1	1	1	1	1	1	1	1	1	1	1	1	2	2	1	3
Las Palmas	10	14	8	13	13	13	11	6	6	5	6	4	4	3	4	5	6	6	6	6	7	7	7	8	9	7	7	8	9	11	14	9	8	8	7	7	8	8	8	7	6	4
Tenerife	4	7	9	4	3	4	5	4	4	6	7	5	3	4	3	4	3	3	4	4	3	4	4	4	4	4	4	4	4	4	4	4	5	5	4	4	4	4	4	4	4	5
Girona	2	5	12	16	20	14	15	19	20	20	19	19	17	13	13	13	10	10	8	8	6	6	6	6	7	5	6	6	6	6	6	5	4	4	5	5	5	5	5	6	5	6
Oviedo	9	15	17	11	5	7	8	7	8	12	15	11	8	9	10	12	9	8	7	7	9	9	8	10	8	9	11	7	8	10	7	8	7	6	6	6	6	6	6	5	7	7
Ponferradina	6	3	1	3	2	1	3	3	3	3	4	6	6	5	5	6	4	4	2	2	4	5	5	5	5	6	5	5	5	5	5	6	6	7	8	8	7	7	7	8	8	8
Cartagena	20	21	15	9	15	8	13	17	10	8	5	8	10	11	9	11	8	9	10	10	8	8	9	7	6	8	8	9	10	7	9	7	9	10	13	11	9	9	9	9	9	9
Zaragoza	12	18	21	17	18	19	18	20	19	18	18	18	19	16	12	8	12	11	9	13	14	16	16	16	18	18	18	16	15	14	11	14	13	14	11	12	12	14	14	14	13	10
Burgos	18	16	20	15	16	16	19	15	17	17	14	10	14	17	18	16	17	15	13	9	10	11	14	11	12	11	9	10	11	9	10	12	10	9	12	10	10	11	12	11	10	11
Leganés	19	17	19	21	22	20	14	16	18	19	20	20	20	21	19	20	18	16	17	18	15	17	17	18	17	16	15	14	14	13	13	13	15	12	16	16	15	13	13	13	12	12
Huesca	3	1	4	7	11	11	7	11	12	9	9	12	12	14	15	14	14	14	12	12	11	14	12	15	15	13	14	12	12	15	15	15	11	11	9	9	11	12	11	12	11	13
Mirandés	14	6	13	5	7	5	10	13	13	10	12	17	16	12	14	17	16	18	18	17	18	15	18	17	16	17	17	18	17	18	17	16	16	15	14	14	16	16	16	15	15	14
Ibiza	15	13	6	8	8	9	4	8	15	16	16	15	9	10	7	9	11	12	14	14	16	13	10	9	10	10	10	11	7	8	8	10	12	13	10	13	13	10	10	10	14	15
Lugo	8	12	18	20	14	18	17	18	14	14	11	13	13	15	16	15	15	17	16	16	17	18	13	13	11	12	12	13	13	12	12	11	14	16	15	15	14	15	15	16	16	16
Sporting Gijón	7	9	3	1	1	2	1	2	2	1	3	3	7	7	8	10	13	13	15	15	12	12	15	12	13	14	13	15	16	17	18	18	17	17	17	17	17	17	17	17	17	17
Málaga	13	11	7	14	6	10	16	10	11	13	13	9	11	8	11	7	7	7	11	11	13	10	11	14	14	15	16	17	18	16	16	17	18	18	18	18	18	18	18	18	18	18
Real Sociedad B	5	8	10	12	17	17	20	14	16	15	17	16	18	19	20	18	19	20	21	21	21	21	21	21	21	21	21	21	19	19	19	19	19	20	20	20	19	19	19	19	19	19
Amorebieta	22	22	16	19	19	21	21	21	21	21	21	21	21	20	21	21	21	21	20	20	20	19	19	20	19	19	19	19	20	20	20	21	21	19	19	19	20	20	20	20	20	20
Fuenlabrada	16	10	11	10	12	12	9	12	7	11	10	14	15	18	17	19	20	19	19	19	19	20	20	19	20	20	20	20	21	21	21	20	20	21	21	21	21	21	21	21	21	21
Alcorcón	17	19	22	22	21	22	22	22	22	22	22	22	22	22	22	22	22	22	22	22	22	22	22	22	22	22	22	22	22	22	22	22	22	22	22	22	22	22	22	22	22	22

Promotion to La Liga
Qualification to promotion play-offs
Relegation to Primera División RFEF

Source: BDFútbol

== Promotion play-offs ==
Semi–finals
3	Eibar	1	0	1
6	Girona (a.e.t.)	0	2	2
4	Las Palmas	0	1	1
5	Tenerife	1	2	3

Final
6	Girona	0	3	3
5	Tenerife	0	1	1

== Season statistics ==
=== Top goalscorers ===
Rank	Player	Club	Goals
1	(Spain) Borja Bastón	Oviedo	22
1	(Uruguay) Cristhian Stuani	Girona	22
3	(Spain) Stoichkov	Eibar	21
4	(Spain) Rubén Castro	Cartagena	20
4	(Israel) Shon Weissman	Valladolid	20
6	(Nigeria) Umar Sadiq	Almería	18
7	(Spain) Sergio Camello	Mirandés	15
8	(Montenegro) Uroš Đurđević	Sporting Gijón	14
8	(Spain) Jaime Seoane	Huesca	14
8	(Spain) Jonathan Viera	Las Palmas	14
8	(Brazil) Yuri	Ponferradina	14

=== Top assists ===
Rank	Player	Club	Assists
1	(Spain) Rodrigo Riquelme	Mirandés	12
2	(Spain) Borja Sánchez	Oviedo	10
3	(Nigeria) Umar Sadiq	Almería	9
4	(Argentina) Pablo de Blasis	Cartagena	8
4	(Spain) Rubén Pardo	Leganés	8
4	(Spain) Francisco Portillo	Almería	8
7	(Poland) Mateusz Bogusz	Ibiza	7
7	(Spain) Fran Gámez	Zaragoza	7
7	(Spain) Gaizka Larrazabal	Amorebieta	7
7	(Spain) José Antonio Ríos	Ponferradina	7

=== Zamora Trophy ===
The Zamora Trophy was awarded by newspaper Marca to the goalkeeper with the lowest goals-to-games ratio. A goalkeeper had to have played at least 28 games of 60 or more minutes to be eligible for the trophy.

Rank	Player	Club	Goals against	Matches	Average
1	(Spain) Fernando	Almería	33	41	0.80
2	(Spain) Juan Soriano	Tenerife	35	41	0.85
3	(Spain) Joan Femenías	Oviedo	41	42	0.98
4	(Spain) Juan Carlos	Girona	39	38	1.03
5	(Spain) Alfonso Herrero	Burgos	29	28	1.04

=== Hat-tricks ===
Player	For	Against	Result	Date	Round	Ref.
(Portugal) Dyego Sousa	Almería	Mirandés	4–1 (A)	24 October 2021	12	
(Uruguay) Cristhian Stuani	Girona	Alcorcón	3–1 (H)	4 November 2021	14	
(Spain) Juanma	Burgos	Leganés	4–0 (H)	23 January 2022	24	
(Spain) Sergio León	Valladolid	Amorebieta	5–1 (H)	27 February 2022	29	
(Spain) Rubén Castro	Cartagena	Amorebieta	5–0 (H)	21 May 2022	41	

Note

(H) – Home; (A) – Away

=== Discipline ===
==== Player ====
- Most yellow cards: 15
  - (Spain) Roque Mesa (Valladolid)
- Most red cards: 3
  - (Spain) Alberto Escassi (Málaga)

==== Team ====
- Most yellow cards: 124
  - Fuenlabrada
- Most red cards: 11
  - Fuenlabrada
- Fewest yellow cards: 77
  - Real Sociedad B
- Fewest red cards: 2
  - Burgos
  - Zaragoza

== Awards ==
=== Monthly ===
Month	Player of the Month		Reference
Month	Player	Club	Reference
October	(Spain) Stoichkov	Eibar	
November	(Spain) Fernando	Almería	
December	(Uruguay) Cristhian Stuani	Girona	
January	(Spain) Sergio Castel	Ibiza	
February	(Nigeria) Umar Sadiq	Almería	
March	(Argentina) Nahuel Bustos	Girona	
April	(Spain) Borja Bastón	Oviedo	
May	(Spain) Jonathan Viera	Las Palmas	

== Attendance to stadiums ==
=== Restrictions ===
Due to the COVID-19 pandemic, clubs were not allowed to use the total capacity of their stadiums. According to the progress of the pandemic, the capacity allowed each month was decided by the Government of Spain, in agreement with the Autonomous Communities.

- August (rounds 1 to 3): 40% of capacity allowed. Additionally, the Basque Country reduced it to 20%, Catalonia to 30% and the Valencian Community limited the attendance to a maximum of 15,000 spectators, always respecting the agreement.
- September (rounds 4 to 7): 60% of capacity allowed. The Basque Country raised its own limit to 30%, while Catalonia did to 40%.
- October (rounds 8 to 13): full capacity allowed, except for Catalonia and Basque Country, whose Governments limited the attendance to 60%.

=== Average attendances ===
Pos	Team	Total	High	Low	Average	Change
1	Zaragoza	122,068	25,307	6,745	15,259	n/a
2	Valladolid	91,162	14,408	10,080	13,023	n/a
3	Las Palmas	94,286	30,064	7,100	11,786	n/a
4	Málaga	80,153	15,901	6,519	11,450	n/a
5	Oviedo	128,287	21,056	5,969	10,690	n/a
6	Sporting Gijón	106,350	16,541	8,989	10,635	n/a
7	Tenerife	66,024	12,572	4,999	9,432	n/a
8	Almería	51,645	9,513	3,398	7,378	n/a
9	Burgos	46,058	9,584	4,373	6,580	n/a
10	Cartagena	42,176	7,591	4,770	6,025	n/a
11	Leganés	39,708	7,436	4,124	5,673	n/a
12	Huesca	41,490	6,826	2,944	5,186	n/a
13	Ponferradina	34,090	5,600	2,743	4,261	n/a
14	Girona	30,295	6,101	1,871	3,787	n/a
15	Ibiza	22,604	3,742	2,487	3,229	n/a
16	Real Sociedad B	23,649	6,266	845	2,956	n/a^{1}
17	Eibar	19,470	4,097	1,146	2,781	n/a
18	Lugo	20,249	5,069	1,657	2,531	n/a
19	Mirandés	19,120	2,953	2,054	2,390	n/a
20	Fuenlabrada	16,195	3,244	1,184	2,024	n/a
21	Alcorcón	12,089	1,953	1,044	1,511	n/a
22	Amorebieta	6,625	1,236	592	946	n/a
	League total	1,041,238	25,887	592	6,311	n/a

Updated to games played on 8 November 2021
Source: La Liga
Notes:
1: One match played at Ipurua stadium.

== Number of teams by region ==
Position	Region	Number	Teams
1	Castile and León	4	Burgos, Mirandés, Ponferradina, Valladolid
2	Basque Country	3	Amorebieta, Eibar, Real Sociedad B
2	Community of Madrid	3	Alcorcón, Fuenlabrada, Leganés
4	Andalusia	2	Almería, Málaga
4	Aragón	2	Huesca, Zaragoza
4	Asturias	2	Oviedo, Sporting Gijón
4	Canary Islands	2	Las Palmas, Tenerife
8	Balearic Islands	1	Ibiza
8	Catalonia	1	Girona
8	Galicia	1	Lugo
8	Region of Murcia	1	Cartagena

== See also ==
- 2021–22 La Liga
- 2021–22 Primera División RFEF (third tier)
- 2021–22 Segunda División RFEF (fourth tier)
- 2021–22 Tercera División RFEF (fifth tier)
