= Arnau Martínez =

Spanish footballer (born 2003)

Personal information
- Full name: Arnau Martínez López
- Date of birth: 25 April 2003 (age 23)
- Place of birth: Premià de Dalt, Spain
- Height: 1.82 m (6 ft 0 in)
- Position: Defender

Team information
- Current team: Valencia
- Number: 22

Youth career
- Premià Dalt
- 2010–2016: Barcelona
- 2016–2018: Hospitalet
- 2018–2021: Girona

Senior career*
Years	Team	Apps	(Gls)
2020–2021	Girona B	7	(0)
2021–2026	Girona	171	(9)
2026–	Valencia	0	(0)

International career^{‡}
2021–2022	Spain U19	6	(1)
2022–2023	Spain U21	12	(0)
2022–	Catalonia	2	(0)
Medal record
Representing Spain
UEFA European Under-21 Championship
Runner-up	2023 Georgia–Romania	Team
- * Club domestic league appearances and goals as of 21 August 2026 ‡ National team caps and goals as of 21 November 2023

Arnau Martínez López (born 25 April 2003) is a Spanish professional footballer who plays as a defender for La Liga club Valencia. Mainly a right-back, he can also play as a centre-back.

== Club career ==
=== Early career ===
Born in Premià de Dalt, Barcelona, Catalonia, Martínez joined FC Barcelona's La Masia in 2010, after playing for CE Premià de Dalt. He left the club in 2016, and represented CE L'Hospitalet before moving to Girona FC in September 2018.

=== Girona ===
On 29 November 2020, after renewing his contract until 2023, Martínez made his senior debut with the reserves, starting in a 2–2 Tercera División away draw against UE Sant Andreu. He made his first team debut on 17 December, coming on as a second-half substitute for Enric Franquesa in a 2–0 away win against Gimnástica Segoviana CF, for the season's Copa del Rey.

Martínez made his professional debut on 7 January 2021, again replacing Franquesa in a 2–1 home win against CD Lugo, also for the national cup. His Segunda División debut occurred on 28 March, as he started in a 2–1 home success over Albacete Balompié.

Martínez subsequently established himself as a starter, and scored his first professional goal on 9 May 2021 by netting the opener in a 4–1 away routing of UD Logroñés; aged 18 years and 14 days, he became the youngest goalscorer of the club's history. He finished the 2021–22 campaign with two goals in 42 appearances overall, as the club achieved promotion to La Liga.

Martínez made his debut in the main category of Spanish football on 14 August 2022, replacing Yan Couto late into a 1–0 away loss to Valencia CF. He scored his first goal in the top tier on 18 September, but in a 2–1 loss at Real Betis.

Martínez lost his starting spot to new signings Daley Blind and Eric Garcia during the 2023–24 season as the club qualified to the UEFA Champions League for the first time in their history, but still renewed his contract until 2027 on 13 August 2024.

=== Valencia ===
On 26 August 2026, after suffering relegation with Girona, Martínez was announced at Valencia in the top tier on a five-year deal.

== Career statistics ==
As of 26 August 2026

Appearances and goals by club, season and competition
Club	Season	League			Copa del Rey		Europe		Other		Total	
Club	Season	Division	Apps	Goals	Apps	Goals	Apps	Goals	Apps	Goals	Apps	Goals
Girona B	2020–21	Tercera División	7	0	—		—		—		7	0
Girona	2020–21	Segunda División	12	1	4	0	—		4 (Note: Appearances in Segunda División promotion play-offs)	0	20	1
Girona	2021–22	Segunda División	36	1	2	0	—		4	1	42	2
Girona	2022–23	La Liga	33	3	2	0	—		—		35	3
Girona	2023–24	La Liga	21	0	5	0	—		—		26	0
Girona	2024–25	La Liga	32	2	2	1	5 (Note: Appearances in UEFA Champions League)	0	—		39	3
Girona	2025–26	La Liga	35	2	1	0	—		—		36	2
Girona	2026–27	Segunda División	2	0	0	0	—		—		2	0
Girona	Total		171	9	16	1	5	0	8	1	200	11
Valencia	2026–27	La Liga	0	0	0	0	—		—		0	0
Career total			178	9	16	1	5	0	8	1	207	11
