= Bojan Miovski =

Macedonian footballer (born 1999)

Personal information
- Date of birth: 24 June 1999 (age 27)
- Place of birth: Štip, Macedonia
- Height: 1.89 m (6 ft 2 in)
- Position: Forward

Team information
- Current team: Rangers
- Number: 28

Youth career
- Bregalnica
- 2017: Rabotnichki
- 2017: → Qarabağ (loan)

Senior career*
Years	Team	Apps	(Gls)
2016–2017	Bregalnica	10	(6)
2017–2018	Rabotnichki	4	(1)
2018–2019	Makedonija GP	8	(4)
2019–2020	Renova	28	(11)
2020–2022	MTK	61	(26)
2022–2024	Aberdeen	79	(57)
2024–2025	Girona	22	(4)
2025–	Rangers	31	(8)

International career^{‡}
2017–2018	Macedonia U19	4	(2)
2020	North Macedonia U21	4	(3)
2021–	North Macedonia	45	(9)
- * Club domestic league appearances and goals as of 14:58, 9 September 2026 (UTC) ‡ National team caps and goals as of 16:10, 8 October 2026 (UTC)

Bojan Miovski (Macedonian: Бојан Миовски; born 24 June 1999) is a Macedonian professional footballer who plays as a forward for Scottish Premiership club Rangers and the North Macedonia national team.

== Club career ==
=== Early career ===
Miovski started his professional career at the age of 18 by making his Macedonian First League debut for Bregalnica in 2017. In July 2020, he made his first professional transfer abroad, by signing for Hungarian side MTK Budapest. Two months after joining his club, he also made his league debut in the fourth round of the Nemzeti Bajnokság I by playing 23 minutes in a 3–0 loss to Zalaegerszegi.

=== Aberdeen ===
On 23 June 2022, Miovski signed a four-year contract with Scottish Premiership side Aberdeen. The same year on 24 July, he debuted for Aberdeen against Raith Rovers during a group stage match of the 2022–23 Scottish League Cup. Miovski scored from a penalty shot after being brought down in the box as Aberdeen won 3–0.

=== Girona ===
On 15 August 2024, Miovski signed a four-year deal with La Liga club Girona for a fee or £6.8 million. On 2 October, during the 2024–25 UEFA Champions League, Miovski debuted for the club in a 3–2 loss against Feyenoord. On 30 October, he scored his first two goals for the club during a Copa Del Ray match against CD Extremadura. On 23 November, he scored a brace and registered an assist against Espanyol in a league match at the Estadi Montilivi. Having been used as a substitute, Miovski struggled for playing time during the season and only scored four goals in 22 appearances.

=== Rangers ===
Miovski returned to Scotland on 30 August 2025, signing for Premiership club Rangers on a four-year contract for an undisclosed fee, which was widely reported to be an initial fee of £2.6 million which could rise to £4.2 million with add-ons. He made his debut the next day, playing 72 minutes in a goalless Old Firm match against Rangers rivals Celtic at Ibrox. Miovski scored his first goal for Rangers in a 2–0 victory over Hibernian at Ibrox in a League Cup quarter-final match on 20 September 2025. On 5 October 2025, he scored his first Scottish Premiership goal for Rangers in a 1–1 draw with Falkirk at Falkirk Stadium. On 11 December 2025, he scored his first Europa League goal in a 2–1 loss away to Ferencváros at Ferencváros Stadion. On 16 January 2026, he scored his first career hatrick as Rangers defeated Annan Athletic 5–0 at Ibrox in the Scottish Cup fourth round.

== International career ==
Miovski debuted for North Macedonia U21 on 8 October 2020 in the 2021 UEFA European Under-21 Championship qualification, coming on as a substitute in the 62nd minute against Kazakhstan. The away match finished as a 1–4 victory for North Macedonia. Exactly one year later, on 8 October 2021, he debuted for the senior squad in a 2022 FIFA World Cup qualification against Liechtenstein. In 2023, Miovski scored the winning goal for North Macedonia during a 1–0 friendly victory against Faroe Islands.

== Career statistics ==
=== Club ===
As of match played 9 September 2026

Appearances and goals by club, season and competition
Club	Season	League			National cup (Note: Includes Macedonian Football Cup, Magyar Kupa, Scottish Cup, Copa del Rey)		League cup (Note: Includes Scottish League Cup)		Europe		Total	
Club	Season	Division	Apps	Goals	Apps	Goals	Apps	Goals	Apps	Goals	Apps	Goals
Bregalnica Štip	2016–17	Macedonian First League	7	2	2	0	—		—		9	2
Rabotnički	2017–18	Macedonian First League	2	0	0	0	—		—		2	0
Makedonija GP	2018–19	Macedonian First League	5	1	3	1	—		—		8	2
Renova	2018–19	Macedonian First League	7	3	0	0	—		—		7	3
Renova	2019–20	Macedonian First League	18	2	3	1	—		—		21	3
Renova	Total		25	5	3	1	—		—		28	6
MTK Budapest	2020–21	NB I	26	7	3	2	—		—		29	9
MTK Budapest	2021–22	NB I	30	8	1	2	—		—		31	10
MTK Budapest	Total		56	15	4	4	—		—		60	19
Aberdeen	2022–23	Scottish Premiership	37	16	1	0	4	2	—		42	18
Aberdeen	2023–24	Scottish Premiership	38	16	4	4	4	2	7 (Note: Two appearances and two goals in UEFA Europa League, five appearances and two goals in UEFA Europa Conference League)	4	53	26
Aberdeen	2024–25	Scottish Premiership	2	0	—		1	0	—		3	0
Aberdeen	Total		77	32	5	4	9	4	7	4	98	44
Girona	2024–25	La Liga	17	2	1	2	—		4 (Note: Appearances in UEFA Champions League)	0	22	4
Girona	2025–26	La Liga	1	0	—		—		—		1	0
Girona	Total		18	2	1	2	—		4	0	23	4
Rangers	2025–26	Scottish Premiership	29	7	2	4	2	1	8 (Note: Appearances in UEFA Europa League)	1	41	13
Rangers	2026–27	Scottish Premiership	2	1	0	0	0	0	2 (Note: One appearance in UEFA Europa League, one appearance in UEFA Conference League)	0	4	1
Rangers	Total		31	8	2	4	2	1	10	1	45	14
Career total			221	65	19	11	11	5	21	5	273	91

=== International ===
As of match played 6 October 2026

Appearances and goals by national team, year and competition
National team	Year	Competitive		Friendly		Total	
National team	Year	Apps	Goals	Apps	Goals	Apps	Goals
North Macedonia	2021	4	0	—		4	0
North Macedonia	2022	8	1	1	0	9	1
North Macedonia	2023	6	0	1	1	7	1
North Macedonia	2024	6	3	3	1	9	4
North Macedonia	2025	8	3	1	0	9	3
North Macedonia	2026	4	0	2	0	6	0
Total		37	7	8	2	45	9

Scores and results list North Macedonia's tally first.

List of international goals scored by Bojan Miovksi
No.	Date	Venue	Opponent	Score	Result	Competition
1.	12 June 2022	Toše Proeski Arena, Skopje, North Macedonia	Gibraltar	3–0	4–0	2022–23 UEFA Nations League C
2.	27 March 2023	Toše Proeski Arena, Skopje, North Macedonia	Faroe Islands	1–0	1–0	Friendly
3.	22 March 2024	Mardan Sports Complex, Antalya, Turkey	Moldova	1–0	1–1	Friendly
4.	10 September 2024	Toše Proeski Arena, Skopje, North Macedonia	Armenia	2–0	2–0	2024–25 UEFA Nations League C
5.	13 October 2024	Vazgen Sargsyan Republican Stadium, Yerevan, Armenia	Armenia	1–0	2–0	2024–25 UEFA Nations League C
6.	17 November 2024	Toše Proeski Arena, Skopje, North Macedonia	Faroe Islands	1–0	1–0	2024–25 UEFA Nations League C
7.	22 March 2025	Rheinpark Stadion, Vaduz, Liechtenstein	Liechtenstein	3–0	3–0	2026 FIFA World Cup qualification
8.	25 March 2025	Toše Proeski Arena, Skopje, North Macedonia	Wales	1–0	1–1	2026 FIFA World Cup qualification
9.	18 November 2025	Cardiff City Stadium, Cardiff, Wales	Wales	1–2	1–7	2026 FIFA World Cup qualification

== Honours ==
Individual

- PFA Scotland Team of the Year: 2023–24 Premiership
