= Jhon Solís (footballer, born 2004) =

Colombian footballer (born 2004)

Personal information
- Full name: Jhon Élmer Solís Romero
- Date of birth: 3 October 2004 (age 22)
- Place of birth: Guacarí, Valle del Cauca, Colombia
- Height: 1.88 m (6 ft 2 in)
- Position: Midfielder

Team information
- Current team: Birmingham City
- Number: 14

Youth career
- Racing de Guacarí
- 2019–2022: Atlético Nacional

Senior career*
Years	Team	Apps	(Gls)
2022–2023	Atlético Nacional	30	(0)
2023–2026	Girona	49	(1)
2026	→ Birmingham City (loan)	17	(1)
2026–	Birmingham City	13	(0)

International career^{‡}
2019	Colombia U15	7	(0)
2020	Colombia U16	10	(0)
2026–	Colombia	2	(0)
- * Club domestic league appearances and goals as of 19 September 2026 ‡ National team caps and goals as of 6 October 2026

Jhon Élmer Solís Romero (born 3 October 2004) is a Colombian professional footballer who plays as a midfielder for EFL Championship club Birmingham City and the Colombia national team.

== Early life ==
Born in Guacarí in the Valle del Cauca Department of Colombia, the youngest of three siblings, Solís was named after his father, Jhon Élmer Sr..

== Club career ==
=== Atlético Nacional ===
Solís developed a passion for football from his father, who would buy him footballs as gifts. He began his career with local side Racing de Guacarí, before being spotted by professional side Atlético Nacional. He also represented the Valle del Cauca Department at the National Championship, but did not feature much due to injury.

Having won the national under-17 tournament with Atlético Nacional in 2021, Solís was promoted to the first team the following year, featuring in a handful of games before rejecting loan offers in July from fellow Categoría Primera A clubs. Having finished the 2022 season with six appearances in the first division, Solís was named as a starter for the first game in 2023, and impressed as Atlético Nacional went on to defeat Once Caldas 1–0 on 27 January. His good start to the season continued, and he was noted for his performances in Atlético Nacional's first few games, also being linked with a move to Portuguese side Porto.

On 24 May 2023, with the score-line at 0–0 against Peruvian side Melgar in the Copa Libertadores, Solís was given a second yellow card just after half time for delaying the taking of a throw in. Despite Atlético Nacional winning the game 1–0, Solís received criticism from fans online, who did not believe his performances warranted a starting place in the side.

=== Girona ===
On 1 September 2023, La Liga side Girona announced the signing of Solís on a five-year contract.

==== Birmingham City (loan) ====
On 17 January 2026, Solís joined EFL Championship club Birmingham City on a loan deal until the end of the season.

== International career ==
Solís has represented Colombia at under-15 and under-16 level.

On 2 October 2026, Solís made his debut for the Colombia national team in a friendly against Paraguay.

== Career statistics ==
=== Club ===
As of 19 September 2026

Appearances and goals by club, season and competition
Club	Season	League			National cup		League Cup		Continental		Other		Total	
Club	Season	Division	Apps	Goals	Apps	Goals	Apps	Goals	Apps	Goals	Apps	Goals	Apps	Goals
Atlético Nacional	2022	Liga DIMAYOR	6	0	0	0	—		0	0	0	0	6	0
Atlético Nacional	2023	Liga DIMAYOR	24	0	2	0	—		4 (Note: Appearances in Copa Libertadores)	0	2 (Note: Appearances in Superliga Colombiana)	0	32	0
Atlético Nacional	Total		30	0	2	0	—		4	0	2	0	38	0
Girona	2023–24	La Liga	18	0	4	0	—		—		—		22	0
Girona	2024–25	La Liga	19	1	1	0	—		5 (Note: Appearances in UEFA Champions League)	0	—		25	1
Girona	2025–26	La Liga	12	0	2	0	—		—		—		14	0
Girona	Total		49	1	7	0	—		5	0	0	0	61	1
Birmingham City	2025–26	Championship	17	1	1	0	—		—		—		18	1
Birmingham City	2026–27	Championship	13	0	0	0	2	0	—		—		15	0
Birmingham City	Total		30	1	1	0	2	0	—		—		33	0
Career total			109	2	10	0	2	0	9	0	2	0	132	2

=== International ===
As of match played 6 October 2026

Appearances and goals by national team and year
National team	Year	Apps	Goals
Colombia	2026	2	0
Total		2	0
