= 2024–25 Girona FC season =

Girona FC
2024–25 season
- President: Delfí Geli
- Head coach: Míchel
- Stadium: Estadi Montilivi
- La Liga: 16th
- Copa del Rey: Second round
- UEFA Champions League: League phase
- Top goalscorer: League: Cristhian Stuani (11); All: Cristhian Stuani (11)
- Highest home attendance: 13,891
- Average home league attendance: 11,657
- Biggest win: Girona 4–0 Osasuna; Extremadura 0–4 Girona
- Biggest defeat: PSV Eindhoven 4–0 Girona; Girona 0–4 Atlético Madrid
Home colours	Away colours	Third colours

The 2024–25 season was the 95th season in the history of Girona Futbol Club, and the club's third consecutive season in La Liga. In addition to the domestic league, the club participated in the Copa del Rey and made a debut appearance in the UEFA Champions League, their first ever European competition participation.

== Players ==
=== First-team squad ===
As of 1 February 2025

Note: Flags indicate national team as defined under FIFA eligibility rules; some limited exceptions apply. Players may hold more than one non-FIFA nationality.

No.	Pos.	Nation	Player
1	GK	ESP	Juan Carlos
3	DF	ESP	Miguel Gutiérrez
4	DF	ESP	Arnau Martínez (3rd captain)
5	DF	ESP	David López
6	MF	NED	Donny van de Beek
7	FW	URU	Cristhian Stuani (captain)
8	FW	UKR	Viktor Tsyhankov
9	FW	ESP	Abel Ruiz
10	FW	COL	Yáser Asprilla
11	FW	NED	Arnaut Danjuma (on loan from Villarreal)
12	MF	BRA	Arthur (on loan from Juventus)
13	GK	ARG	Paulo Gazzaniga

No.	Pos.	Nation	Player
14	MF	ESP	Oriol Romeu (on loan from Barcelona)
15	DF	ESP	Juanpe
16	DF	ESP	Alejandro Francés
17	DF	NED	Daley Blind
18	DF	CZE	Ladislav Krejčí
19	FW	MKD	Bojan Miovski
20	FW	ESP	Bryan Gil (on loan from Tottenham Hotspur)
21	MF	VEN	Yangel Herrera
22	MF	COL	Jhon Solís
23	MF	ESP	Iván Martín (vice-captain)
24	FW	ESP	Portu
27	FW	NED	Gabriel Misehouy

=== Reserve team ===
Note: Flags indicate national team as defined under FIFA eligibility rules; some limited exceptions apply. Players may hold more than one non-FIFA nationality.

No.	Pos.	Nation	Player
26	DF	ESP	Oriol Comas
29	FW	KOR	Kim Min-su
30	MF	ESP	Enric García
31	FW	POR	Jastin García
33	DF	ESP	Marc Aznar
34	FW	VEN	Juan Arango
35	DF	HUN	Antal Yaakobishvili
36	MF	ESP	Ricard Artero

No.	Pos.	Nation	Player
37	MF	ESP	Raúl Martínez
40	GK	GAM	Jordi Danso
41	GK	ESP	Pau Funallet
42	GK	ESP	Lucas García
43	GK	BUL	Aleksandar Andreev
44	FW	SEN	Papa Ba
45	DF	ESP	Ferran Ruiz
46	FW	MTN	Dawda Camara

=== Out on loan ===
Note: Flags indicate national team as defined under FIFA eligibility rules; some limited exceptions apply. Players may hold more than one non-FIFA nationality.

No.	Pos.	Nation	Player
—	GK	ESP	Toni Fuidias (at Cartagena until 30 June 2025)
—	DF	ESP	Valery Fernández (at Mallorca until 30 June 2025)
—	MF	MLI	Ibrahima Kébé (at Lommel until 30 June 2025)

No.	Pos.	Nation	Player
—	FW	MAR	Ilyas Chaira (at Oviedo until 30 June 2025)
—	FW	ESP	Joel Roca (at Mirandés until 30 June 2025)

== Transfers ==
=== In ===
Pos.	Player	Transferred from	Fee	Date	Source
DF	(Morocco) Ilyas Chaira	(Spain) Mirandés	Loan return	30 June 2024	
MF	(Mali) Ibrahima Kébé	(Spain) Mirandés	Loan return	30 June 2024	
FW	(Spain) Manu Vallejo	(Spain) Zaragoza	Loan return	30 June 2024	
DF	(Czech Republic) Ladislav Krejčí	(Czech Republic) Sparta Prague	€12,000,000	1 July 2024	
FW	(Spain) Abel Ruiz	(Portugal) Braga	€8,500,000	1 July 2024	
MF	(Netherlands) Gabriel Misehouy	(Netherlands) Ajax	Free	10 July 2024	
MF	(Netherlands) Donny van de Beek	(England) Manchester United	€500,000	11 July 2024	
DF	(Spain) Alejandro Francés	(Spain) Zaragoza	€4,000,000	26 July 2024	
MF	(Spain) Bryan Gil	(England) Tottenham Hotspur	Loan	29 July 2024	
MF	(Spain) Oriol Romeu	(Spain) Barcelona	Loan	5 August 2024	
FW	(North Macedonia) Bojan Miovski	(Scotland) Aberdeen	€4,700,000	15 August 2024	
GK	(Spain) Pau López	(France) Marseille	Loan	16 August 2024	
MF	(Colombia) Yáser Asprilla	(England) Watford	€18,000,000	23 August 2024	
FW	(Netherlands) Arnaut Danjuma	(Spain) Villarreal	Loan	30 August 2024	
MF	(Brazil) Arthur	(Italy) Juventus	Loan	1 February 2025	

=== Out ===
Pos.	Player	Transferred to	Fee	Date	Source
DF	(Brazil) Yan Couto	(England) Manchester City	End of loan	30 June 2024	
DF	(Spain) Eric García	(Spain) Barcelona	End of loan	30 June 2024	
MF	(Spain) Pablo Torre	(Spain) Barcelona	End of loan	30 June 2024	
FW	(Brazil) Savinho	(France) Troyes	End of loan	30 June 2024	
MF	(Spain) Aleix García	(Germany) Bayer Leverkusen	€18,000,000	1 July 2024	
GK	(Spain) Toni Fuidias	(Spain) Cartagena	Loan	10 July 2024	
MF	(Mali) Ibrahima Kébé	(Belgium) Lommel	Loan	24 July 2024	
FW	(Ukraine) Artem Dovbyk	(Italy) Roma	€30,500,000	2 August 2024	
FW	(Dominican Republic) Oscar Ureña	(Spain) Barcelona B	Undisclosed	19 August 2024	
FW	(Spain) Manu Vallejo	(Spain) Racing Ferrol	Free	20 August 2024	
DF	(Morocco) Ilyas Chaira	(Spain) Oviedo	Loan	24 August 2024	
MF	(Spain) Toni Villa	(Spain) Eibar	Free	26 August 2024	
FW	(Spain) Iker Almena	(Saudi Arabia) Al Qadsiah	Undisclosed	30 August 2024	
DF	(Spain) Valery Fernández	(Spain) Mallorca	Loan	30 August 2024	
GK	(Spain) Pau López	(France) Marseille	End of loan	6 January 2025	
MF	(Spain) Selvi Clua	(Spain) Almería	Undisclosed	31 January 2025	

== Friendlies ==
=== Pre-season ===
A first friendly programme versus Olot, Espanyol and Toulouse was announced on 29 May.

17 July 2024 Friendly	Olot (Spain)	1–1	(Spain) Girona	Olot
19:00 CEST (UTC+2)	Torres 49'		Almena 51'	Stadium: Camp Municipal d'Olot

20 July 2024 Friendly	Montpellier (France)	3–3	(Spain) Girona	Les Preses
11:00 CEST (UTC+2)	Nordin 19'; Khazri 71' (pen.), 85'		Dovbyk 24', 38'; Vallejo 81'	Stadium: Instalaciones de Royalverd; Attendance: 0

27 July 2024 Friendly	Espanyol (Spain)	0–0	(Spain) Girona	Navata
11:00 CEST (UTC+2)				Stadium: Campo de Torremirona

31 July 2024 Friendly	Girona (Spain)	0–4	(France) Toulouse	Navata
11:00 CEST (UTC+2)	Gazzaniga (red card) 42'		Nicolaisen 45+4'; Babicka 50'; Aboukhlal 61'; Gelabert 69'	Stadium: Campo de Torremirona

3 August 2024 Friendly	Napoli (Italy)	0–2	(Spain) Girona	Castel di Sangro, Italy
18:30 CEST (UTC+2)	Di Lorenzo (yellow card) 80'		Van de Beek 23'; Valery (yellow card) 61'; Martínez (yellow card) 63'; Toni 83'	Stadium: Stadio Teofilo Patini; Referee: Gabriele Scatena (Italy)

9 August 2024 Sela Cup	Newcastle United (England)	4–0	(Spain) Girona	Newcastle upon Tyne, England
19:30 BST (UTC+1)	Longstaff 2', 38'; Murphy 13'; Isak (penalty missed) 21'; Gordon 25'			Stadium: St James' Park; Attendance: 31,958; Referee: Michael Oliver (England)

10 August 2024 Friendly	Bournemouth (England)	3–2	(Spain) Girona	Bournemouth, England
17:15 BST (UTC+1)	Kluivert 6' (pen.); Scott (yellow card) 57'; Sinisterra 72'; Jebbison 80'		Stuani 35', (yellow card) 82'; Roca 50', (yellow card) 66'	Stadium: Dean Court; Referee: Yusuke Araki (Japan)

=== Copa Catalunya ===
2 April 2025 Semi-finals	Andorra	2–3	Girona	Andorra la Vella
19:00	Peña 9'; De León 33'	Report	Camara 44'; Folgarolas 57' (o.g.); Arango 90+3'	Stadium: Estadi Nacional

== Competitions ==
=== Overall record ===
Competition	First match	Last match	Starting round	Final position	Record							
Competition	First match	Last match	Starting round	Final position	Pld	W	D	L	GF	GA	GD	Win %
La Liga	15 August 2024	25 May 2025	Matchday 1	16th	38	11	8	19	44	60	−16	28.95
Copa del Rey	30 October 2024	4 December 2024	First round	Second round	2	1	1	0	4	0	+4	50.00
UEFA Champions League	18 September 2024	29 January 2025	League phase	League phase	8	1	0	7	5	13	−8	12.50
Total					48	13	9	26	53	73	−20	27.08

Source: Soccerway

=== La Liga ===
==== League table ====
Pos	Team	Pld	W	D	L	GF	GA	GD	Pts	Qualification or relegation
14	Espanyol	38	11	9	18	40	51	−11	42 (Note: Head-to-head points: Getafe 9, Espanyol 9, Alavés 0.)	
15	Alavés	38	10	12	16	38	48	−10	42	
16	Girona	38	11	8	19	44	60	−16	41 (Note: Girona finished ahead of Sevilla on head-to-head goal difference: Sevilla 0–2 Girona, Girona 1–2 Sevilla.)	
17	Sevilla	38	10	11	17	42	55	−13	41	
18	Leganés (R)	38	9	13	16	39	56	−17	40	Relegation to Segunda División

Source: LaLiga EA Sports
Rules for classification: 1) Points; 2) Head-to-head points; 3) Head-to-head goal difference; 4) Goal difference; 5) Goals scored; 6) Fair-play points
(Note: Head-to-head record is used only after all the matches between the teams in question have been played)
(R) Relegated

==== Results summary ====
Overall								Home						Away					
Pld	W	D	L	GF	GA	GD	Pts	W	D	L	GF	GA	GD	W	D	L	GF	GA	GD
38	11	8	19	44	60	−16	41	7	3	9	27	30	−3	4	5	10	17	30	−13

Source: La Liga

==== Results by round ====
Round	1	2	3	4	5	6	7	8	9	10	11	12	13	14	15	16	17	18	19	20	21	22	23	24	25	26	27	28	29	30	31	32	33	34	35	36	37	38
Ground	A	A	H	A	H	A	H	A	H	H	A	H	A	H	A	H	A	H	A	H	A	H	A	H	A	H	A	H	A	H	A	H	A	H	H	A	A	H
Result	D	L	W	W	L	L	D	D	W	L	L	W	W	W	D	L	L	W	W	L	L	W	L	L	L	D	D	D	L	L	L	L	D	W	L	W	L	L
Position	15	18	7	5	8	12	12	12	11	12	13	12	10	7	8	9	10	8	8	8	8	7	8	10	13	13	13	13	13	14	16	16	16	15	15	13	15	16

Source: La Liga
A = Away; H = Home; W = Win; D = Draw; L = Loss

==== Matches ====
The league schedule was released on 18 June 2024.

15 August 2024 1	Real Betis	1–1	Girona	Seville
21:30 CEST (UTC+2)	Bartra 6'; Perraud (yellow card) 83'; Ruibal (yellow card) 87'	Report	Misehouy 72'	Stadium: Benito Villamarín; Attendance: 54,084; Referee: Miguel Ángel Ortiz Arias

25 August 2024 2	Atlético Madrid	3–0	Girona	Madrid
21:30 CEST (UTC+2)	De Paul (yellow card) 25'; Griezmann 39'; Llorente 48'; Koke 90+4'	Report	Ruiz (yellow card) 28'; Gazzaniga (yellow card) 37'; Romeu (yellow card) 55'	Stadium: Cívitas Metropolitano; Attendance: 60,414; Referee: Juan Martínez Munuera

29 August 2024 3	Girona	4–0	Osasuna	Girona
19:00 CEST (UTC+2)	Gil 34'; Tsyhankov 53'; Ruiz 56'; Stuani 90'	Report		Stadium: Montilivi; Attendance: 13,275; Referee: Francisco José Hernández Maeso

1 September 2024 4	Sevilla	0–2	Girona	Seville
19:00 CEST (UTC+2)	Sambi Lokonga (yellow card) 47'; Badé (yellow card) 67'; Romero (yellow card) 90+4'	Report	Martín 41'; Asprilla (yellow card) 63'; Ruiz 73' (pen.); Francés (yellow card) 76'	Stadium: Ramón Sánchez Pizjuán; Attendance: 35,735; Referee: José María Sánchez Martínez

15 September 2024 5	Girona	1–4	Barcelona	Girona
16:15 CEST (UTC+2)	Gil (yellow card) 36'; Stuani 80', (yellow card) 90+6'; Portu (yellow card) 90+1'	Report	Yamal 30', 37', (yellow card) 90+1'; Olmo 47'; Pedri 64'; Víctor (yellow card) 84'; Torres (red card) 86'	Stadium: Montilivi; Attendance: 13,891; Referee: Alejandro Muñiz Ruiz

21 September 2024 6	Valencia	2–0	Girona	Valencia
18:30 CEST (UTC+2)	Rioja 56'; Gómez 58'; Pepelu (yellow card) 60'; Guerra (yellow card) 82'; Canós (yellow card) 89'	Report	Juanpe (yellow card) 24'; Danjuma (yellow card) 45'	Stadium: Mestalla; Attendance: 40,896; Referee: Alejandro Hernández Hernández

25 September 2024 7	Girona	0–0	Rayo Vallecano	Girona
19:00 CEST (UTC+2)	Tsyhankov (yellow card) 20'; Ruiz (yellow card) 58'; Herrera (yellow card) 83'	Report	Díaz (yellow card) 45'; López (yellow card) 64'; Balliu (yellow card) 89'; Rațiu (yellow card) 90+3'	Stadium: Montilivi; Attendance: 12,272; Referee: Juan Martínez Munuera

29 September 2024 8	Celta Vigo	1–1	Girona	Vigo
14:00 CEST (UTC+2)	Álvarez (yellow card) 78'; Aspas 81'	Report	Herrera 38'	Stadium: Balaídos; Attendance: 21,347; Referee: Ricardo de Burgos Bengoetxea

6 October 2024 9	Girona	2–1	Athletic Bilbao	Girona
14:00 CEST (UTC+2)	Krejčí (yellow card) 31'; Asprilla 39'; Gazzaniga (yellow card) 56'; D. López (yellow card) 57'; Herrera (yellow card) 90+1'; Stuani 90+9' (pen.)	Report	Berenguer (penalty missed) 28'; Sancet 41'; Vivian (yellow card) 45+3'; Herrera (penalty missed) 58'; Paredes (yellow card) 90+7' (yellow-red card) 90+8'	Stadium: Montilivi; Attendance: 13,396; Referee: Juan Luis Pulido Santana

19 October 2024 10	Girona	0–1	Real Sociedad	Girona
18:30 CEST (UTC+2)	Martínez (yellow card) 30'; Herrera (yellow card) 74'	Report	Oyarzabal 44'; Méndez (yellow card) 55'	Stadium: Montilivi; Attendance: 12,602; Referee: César Soto Grado

26 October 2024 11	Las Palmas	1–0	Girona	Las Palmas
17:30 WEST (UTC+1)	Campaña (yellow card) 21'; Á. Muñoz 42'; Essugo (yellow card) 47'; Mata (yellow card) 90+5'; Sandro (yellow card) 90+7'	Report	Van de Beek (yellow card) 72'; Juan Carlos (red card) 78'; Blind (yellow card) 87'; Martínez (yellow card) 90+1'; D. López (yellow card) 90+2'; Krejčí (yellow card) 90+6'	Stadium: Estadio Gran Canaria; Attendance: 21,506; Referee: Alejandro Quintero González
Note: Juan Carlos received a red card for dissent as an unused substitute.

2 November 2024 12	Girona	4–3	Leganés	Girona
16:15 CET (UTC+1)	Gutiérrez 21'; Martínez 31'; Stuani 62' (pen.); González 73' (o.g.); Gazzaniga (yellow card) 88'; Krejčí (yellow card) 89'; Romeu (yellow card) 90+2'	Report	Tapia 25'; Neyou (yellow card) 33'; Cruz 41'; Munir 77', (yellow card) 87'; Nastasić (yellow card) 81'; Óscar (yellow card) 90+8'	Stadium: Montilivi; Attendance: 10,839; Referee: Mateo Busquets Ferrer

10 November 2024 13	Getafe	0–1	Girona	Getafe
18:30 CET (UTC+1)	Rico (yellow card) 38'; Sola (yellow card) 87'; Yıldırım (yellow card) 90+2'	Report	Van de Beek (yellow card) 34'; Romeu (yellow card) 39'; Herrera (yellow card) 40', (goal) 42'	Stadium: Coliseum; Attendance: 10,923; Referee: Juan Martínez Munuera

23 November 2024 14	Girona	4–1	Espanyol	Girona
18:30 CET (UTC+1)	Gil 4'; Miovski 16', 21'; Krejčí 27'	Report	Romero (yellow card) 36'; Puado 55', (yellow card) 71'; Carreras (yellow card) 72'	Stadium: Montilivi; Attendance: 12,461; Referee: Alejandro Hernández Hernández

1 December 2024 15	Villarreal	2–2	Girona	Villarreal
14:00 CET (UTC+1)	Barry 23'; Cardona (yellow card) 40'; Baena 46'; Albiol (yellow card) 85'	Report	Krejčí (yellow card) 18', (goal) 90+7'; Gil (yellow card) 31'; Van de Beek 66', (yellow card) 90+3'; Gutiérrez (yellow card) 85'; Blind (yellow card) 90+3'; Portu (yellow card) 90+8'	Stadium: Estadio de la Cerámica; Attendance: 17,732; Referee: Miguel Ángel Ortiz Arias

7 December 2024 16	Girona	0–3	Real Madrid	Girona
21:00 CET (UTC+1)	Krejčí (yellow card) 76'; Romeu (yellow card) 90'; Portu (yellow card) 90+4'	Report	Bellingham 36'; Mbappé (yellow card) 45+2', (goal) 62'; Güler 55'; Rüdiger (yellow card) 76'	Stadium: Montilivi; Attendance: 13,827; Referee: Jesús Gil Manzano

14 December 2024 17	Mallorca	2–1	Girona	Palma
16:15 CET (UTC+1)	Larin 20', 51'; Muriqi (red card) 32'; Morlanes (yellow card) 32'; Mascarell (yellow card) 42'; Copete (yellow card) 42'; Valjent (yellow card) 66'; Abdón (yellow card) 78'	Report	Van de Beek 7'; D. López (yellow card) 47'; Romeu (yellow card) 57'	Stadium: Estadi Mallorca Son Moix; Attendance: 15,866; Referee: Francisco José Hernández Maeso

20 December 2024 18	Girona	3–0	Valladolid	Girona
21:00 CET (UTC+1)	Ruiz (yellow card) 24', (goal) 39'; D. López 31'; Gutiérrez (yellow card) 54'; Martín (yellow card) 60'; Danjuma 81'	Report	Sánchez (yellow card) 30'	Stadium: Montilivi; Attendance: 9,534; Referee: Pablo González Fuertes

11 January 2025 19	Alavés	0–1	Girona	Vitoria-Gasteiz
14:00 CET (UTC+1)	Guridi (yellow card) 55'	Report	Danjuma (yellow card) 35'; Herrera (yellow card) 45+2'; Krejčí (yellow card) 49'; Stuani (yellow card) 81'; Solís 90+1'	Stadium: Mendizorrotza; Attendance: 16,454; Referee: Mateo Busquets Ferrer

18 January 2025 20	Girona	1–2	Sevilla	Girona
14:00 CET (UTC+1)	Martínez 36'	Report	Romero (penalty missed) 3', (yellow card) 65'; Pedrosa (yellow card) 55'; Saúl 59', (yellow card) 90+3'; Carmona (yellow card) 76'; Lukebakio 88'	Stadium: Montilivi; Attendance: 12,040; Referee: Juan Martínez Munuera

26 January 2025 21	Rayo Vallecano	2–1	Girona	Madrid
14:00 CET (UTC+1)	López (yellow card) 21'; Nteka 80', 83', (yellow card) 90+2'; Lejeune (yellow card) 90+7'	Report	Gil 58'; Herrera (yellow card) 70'	Stadium: Vallecas; Attendance: 12,405; Referee: Isidro Díaz de Mera Escuderos

3 February 2025 22	Girona	2–1	Las Palmas	Girona
21:00 CET (UTC+1)	Ruiz 8', (penalty missed) 45+1'; Van de Beek (yellow card) 42'; Asprilla 79'; Solís (yellow card) 81'	Report	McKenna (yellow card) 45'; Silva 82'	Stadium: Montilivi; Attendance: 10,088; Referee: Mario Melero López

8 February 2025 23	Athletic Bilbao	3–0	Girona	Bilbao
16:15 CET (UTC+1)	Sancet 42' (pen.), 45+1', 79'	Report	Gil (yellow card) 63'; Juanpe (yellow card) 71'; Herrera (yellow card) 74'; Krejčí (yellow card) 88'	Stadium: San Mamés; Attendance: 48,261; Referee: José María Sánchez Martínez

14 February 2025 24	Girona	1–2	Getafe	Girona
21:00 CET (UTC+1)	Herrera 54', (red card) 73'; Portu (yellow card) 79'; Asprilla (yellow card) 90+7'	Report	Uche 3', (yellow card) 88'; Mayoral 62'; Pérez (yellow card) 76'; Alderete (yellow card) 90'	Stadium: Montilivi; Attendance: 10,354; Referee: Alejandro Quintero González

23 February 2025 25	Real Madrid	2–0	Girona	Madrid
16:15 CET (UTC+1)	Modrić 41'; Vinícius 83'	Report	Krejčí (yellow card) 64'; Solís (yellow card) 70'	Stadium: Santiago Bernabéu; Attendance: 74,028; Referee: Guillermo Cuadra Fernández

1 March 2025 26	Girona	2–2	Celta Vigo	Girona
14:00 CET (UTC+1)	Tsyhankov 21'; Herrera 68'	Report	Losada 36'; Alonso 51' (pen.)	Stadium: Montilivi; Attendance: 11,449; Referee: Miguel Ángel Ortiz Arias

10 March 2025 27	Espanyol	1–1	Girona	Cornellà de Llobregat
21:00 CET (UTC+1)	Lozano (yellow card) 22'; Expósito (yellow card) 45+3'; Puado (yellow card) 45+3'; Carreras 49'	Report	Krejčí (yellow card) 12'; Gutiérrez (yellow card) 61'; Gil (yellow card) 75'; Stuani 88' (pen.)	Stadium: Stage Front Stadium; Attendance: 23,997; Referee: Adrián Cordero Vega

15 March 2025 28	Girona	1–1	Valencia	Girona
21:00 CET (UTC+1)	Herrera (yellow card) 18'; Stuani 64'; Van de Beek (yellow card) 90+3'	Report	López 58'; Gayà (yellow card) 67'	Stadium: Montilivi; Attendance: 10,262; Referee: José Luis Munuera Montero

30 March 2025 29	Barcelona	4–1	Girona	Barcelona
16:15 CEST (UTC+2)	Krejčí 43' (o.g.); Lewandowski 61', 77'; Torres 86'	Report	Herrera (yellow card) 42'; Danjuma 53'	Stadium: Estadi Olímpic Lluís Companys; Attendance: 48,258; Referee: Juan Luis Pulido Santana

5 April 2025 30	Girona	0–1	Alavés	Girona
14:00 CEST (UTC+2)	Gazzaniga (yellow card) 90+5'	Report	Guridi (yellow card) 58'; Vicente 61'; Abqar (yellow card) 65'; Conechny (yellow card) 83'; Sivera (yellow card) 87'; Blanco (yellow card) 89'	Stadium: Montilivi; Attendance: 11,384; Referee: Alejandro Muñiz Ruiz

13 April 2025 31	Osasuna	2–1	Girona	Pamplona
14:00 CEST (UTC+2)	Budimir 38'; Ibáñez 79'; Barja (yellow card) 86'; Cruz (yellow card) 89'	Report	Stuani (yellow card) 73'; Asprilla 90+6'	Stadium: El Sadar; Attendance: 20,260; Referee: Pablo González Fuertes

21 April 2025 32	Girona	1–3	Real Betis	Girona
21:00 CEST (UTC+2)	Arthur (yellow card) 52'; Francés (yellow card) 65'; Stuani 85'; D. López (yellow card) 90+3'	Report	Cardoso 6'; Ruibal (yellow card) 26'; Antony 39'; Isco 42'; Perraud (yellow card) 90+1'	Stadium: Montilivi; Attendance: 12,535; Referee: Alejandro Hernández Hernández

24 April 2025 33	Leganés	1–1	Girona	Leganés
19:00 CEST (UTC+2)	Altimira (yellow card) 14'; Cissé (red card) 19'; Brašanac (yellow card) 51'; Óscar (yellow card) 74'; García (yellow card) 87'; Munir 90+2'	Report	Stuani 54'; Gutiérrez (yellow card) 66'; Arthur (yellow card) 75'	Stadium: Butarque; Attendance: 11,595; Referee: José Luis Munuera Montero

5 May 2025 34	Girona	1–0	Mallorca	Girona
21:00 CEST (UTC+2)	Stuani 10'	Report	Raíllo (yellow card) 32'; Darder (yellow card) 83'	Stadium: Montilivi; Attendance: 7,721; Referee: Mario Melero López

10 May 2025 35	Girona	0–1	Villarreal	Girona
18:30 CEST (UTC+2)	Krejčí (yellow card) 1'; Herrera (yellow card) 69'	Report	Gueye (yellow card) 15'; Pérez (yellow card) 22'; Parejo (yellow card) 87'; Etta Eyong 89'	Stadium: Montilivi; Attendance: 12,011; Referee: Isidro Díaz de Mera Escuderos

13 May 2025 36	Valladolid	0–1	Girona	Valladolid
19:00 CEST (UTC+2)		Report	Stuani 80'	Stadium: José Zorrilla; Attendance: 12,664; Referee: Alejandro Quintero González

18 May 2025 37	Real Sociedad	3–2	Girona	San Sebastián
19:00 CEST (UTC+2)	Marín 5'; Oyarzabal 20' (pen.); Traoré (yellow card) 62'; Mariezkurrena 90+1'	Report	Stuani 10', (yellow card) 62'; Solís (yellow card) 49'; Portu 77'; Martínez (yellow card) 90+6'	Stadium: Reale Arena; Attendance: 28,315; Referee: Miguel Ángel Ortiz Arias

25 May 2025 38	Girona	0–4	Atlético Madrid	Girona
14:00 CEST (UTC+2)		Report	Sørloth 68', 90', 90+3'; Lenglet 87'	Stadium: Montilivi; Attendance: 11,546; Referee: Jesús Gil Manzano

=== Copa del Rey ===
30 October 2024 First round	Extremadura	0–4	Girona	Almendralejo
21:00 CET (UTC+1)	Rosales (yellow card) 85'	Report	Gil 12'; Misehouy (yellow card) 41'; Van de Beek (yellow card) 45'; Miovski 58', 62'; Martínez 76'	Stadium: Estadio Francisco de la Hera; Attendance: 6,865; Referee: José Luis Munuera Montero

4 December 2024 Second round	UD Logroñés	0–0 (a.e.t.) (4–3 p)	Girona	Logroño
21:00 CET (UTC+1)	Iribarren (yellow card) 90+6'; Moreno (yellow card) 96'; Garrido (yellow card) 113'; Caballero (yellow card) 119'	Report	Martín (yellow card) 67'; Juanpe (yellow card) 106'	Stadium: Las Gaunas; Attendance: 7,287; Referee: Ricardo de Burgos Bengoetxea
	Penalties
	Caballero (penalty scored); Madrazo (penalty missed); Agüero (penalty scored); Moreno (penalty scored); Iribarren (penalty scored)		(penalty scored) Van de Beek; (penalty missed) Ruiz; (penalty scored) Danjuma; (penalty scored) Juanpe; (penalty missed) Stuani

=== UEFA Champions League ===
==== League phase ====
The league phase draw was held on 29 August 2024.

Pos	Team	Pld	W	D	L	GF	GA	GD	Pts
31	(Football Association of the Czech Republic) Sparta Prague	8	1	1	6	7	21	−14	4
32	(German Football Association) RB Leipzig	8	1	0	7	8	15	−7	3
33	(Royal Spanish Football Federation) Girona	8	1	0	7	5	13	−8	3
34	(Austrian Football Association) Red Bull Salzburg	8	1	0	7	5	27	−22	3
35	(Slovak Football Association) Slovan Bratislava	8	0	0	8	7	27	−20	0

Source: UEFA
Rules for classification: League phase tiebreakers

Round	1	2	3	4	5	6	7	8
Ground	A	H	H	A	A	H	A	H
Result	L	L	W	L	L	L	L	L
Position	26	30	24	29	30	30	31	33
Points	0	0	3	3	3	3	3	3

Source: UEFA
A = Away; H = Home; W = Win; D = Draw; L = Loss

Win Draw Loss Fixtures

18 September 2024 1	Paris Saint-Germain (France)	1–0	(Spain) Girona	Paris, France
21:00 CEST (UTC+2)	Marquinhos (yellow card) 17'; Gazzaniga 90' (o.g.)	Report	Krejčí (yellow card) 20'; Romeu (yellow card) 43'; Gazzaniga (yellow card) 74'	Stadium: Parc des Princes; Attendance: 39,951; Referee: Daniel Siebert (Germany)

2 October 2024 2	Girona (Spain)	2–3	(Netherlands) Feyenoord	Girona, Spain
18:45 CEST (UTC+2)	Herrera (yellow card) 4'; Osman (yellow card) 14'; D. López 19', (yellow card) 45+1'; Martín (yellow card) 35'; Danjuma (yellow card) 49'; Miovski (penalty missed) 67'; Van de Beek 73', (yellow card) 75'; Stuani (yellow card) 88'	Report	Herrera 23' (o.g.); Milambo 33'; Ueda (penalty missed) 36'; Bueno (yellow card) 60'; Hwang (yellow card) 64'; Krejčí 79' (o.g.)	Stadium: Montilivi; Attendance: 8,752; Referee: Urs Schnyder (Switzerland)

22 October 2024 3	Girona (Spain)	2–0	(Slovakia) Slovan Bratislava	Girona, Spain
21:00 CEST (UTC+2)	Gutiérrez 42'; Francés (yellow card) 45'; Juanpe 73'; Stuani (penalty missed) 88'	Report	Tolić (yellow card) 16'; Ihnatenko (yellow card) 69'; Barseghyan (yellow card) 71'	Stadium: Montilivi; Attendance: 9,246; Referee: Horațiu Feșnic (Romania)

5 November 2024 4	PSV Eindhoven (Netherlands)	4–0	(Spain) Girona	Eindhoven, Netherlands
18:45 CET (UTC+1)	Flamingo 16'; Tillman 33'; De Jong (yellow card) 40'; Karsdorp (yellow card) 58'; Dams (yellow card) 60'; Bakayoko 83', (yellow card) 90+1'; Krejčí 88' (o.g.)	Report	Martínez (yellow card) 40' (yellow-red card) 55'; Gil (yellow card) 48'; Stuani (yellow card) 90+1'; Gazzaniga (yellow card) 90+1'	Stadium: Philips Stadion; Attendance: 34,400; Referee: Michael Oliver (England)

27 November 2024 5	Sturm Graz (Austria)	1–0	(Spain) Girona	Klagenfurt, Austria
18:45 CET (UTC+1)	Gazibegović (yellow card) 20'; Biereth 59'	Report	Gil (yellow card) 64'	Stadium: Wörthersee Stadion; Attendance: 21,502; Referee: Rohit Saggi (Norway)
Note: The match was played at Wörthersee Stadion in Klagenfurt, instead of Sturm Graz's regular stadium, Liebenauer Stadium in Graz, as it did not meet UEFA requirements.

10 December 2024 6	Girona (Spain)	0–1	(England) Liverpool	Girona, Spain
18:45 CET (UTC+1)	Romeu (yellow card) 55'; Francés (yellow card) 87'; Portu (yellow card) 90+3'	Report	Díaz (yellow card) 53'; Salah 63' (pen.); Gomez (yellow card) 79'	Stadium: Montilivi; Attendance: 9,241; Referee: Benoît Bastien (France)

22 January 2025 7	Milan (Italy)	1–0	(Spain) Girona	Milan, Italy
21:00 CET (UTC+1)	Leão 37'; Calabria (yellow card) 41'; Hernandez (yellow card) 80'	Report	Gil (yellow card) 59'; Martín (yellow card) 82'	Stadium: San Siro; Attendance: 66,030; Referee: Tobias Stieler (Germany)

29 January 2025 8	Girona (Spain)	1–2	(England) Arsenal	Girona, Spain
21:00 CET (UTC+1)	Danjuma 28'; Yaakobishvili (yellow card) 51'; Portu (yellow card) 79'; Martínez (yellow card) 85'; Stuani (yellow card) 90+3'	Report	Jorginho 38' (pen.); Nwaneri 42'; Sterling (yellow card) 70', (penalty missed) 90+3'; Rice (yellow card) 90+3'	Stadium: Montilivi; Attendance: 9,048; Referee: Maurizio Mariani (Italy)

== Statistics ==
=== Squad statistics ===
As of match played 1 August 2024.

No.	Pos	Nat	Player	Total		La Liga		Copa del Rey		Champions League	
No.	Pos	Nat	Player	Apps	Goals	Apps	Goals	Apps	Goals	Apps	Goals
Goalkeepers
1	GK	(Spain) ESP	Juan Carlos	0	0	0	0	0	0	0	0
13	GK	(Argentina) ARG	Paulo Gazzaniga	0	0	0	0	0	0	0	0
25	GK	(Spain) ESP	Pau López	0	0	0	0	0	0	0	0
Defenders
3	DF	(Spain) ESP	Miguel Gutiérrez	0	0	0	0	0	0	0	0
4	DF	(Spain) ESP	Arnau Martínez	0	0	0	0	0	0	0	0
5	DF	(Spain) ESP	David López	0	0	0	0	0	0	0	0
15	DF	(Spain) ESP	Juanpe	0	0	0	0	0	0	0	0
16	DF	(Spain) ESP	Alejandro Francés	0	0	0	0	0	0	0	0
17	DF	(Netherlands) NED	Daley Blind	0	0	0	0	0	0	0	0
18	DF	(Czech Republic) CZE	Ladislav Krejčí	0	0	0	0	0	0	0	0
Midfielders
6	MF	(Netherlands) NED	Donny van de Beek	0	0	0	0	0	0	0	0
10	MF	(Colombia) COL	Yáser Asprilla	0	0	0	0	0	0	0	0
14	MF	(Spain) ESP	Oriol Romeu	0	0	0	0	0	0	0	0
21	MF	(Venezuela) VEN	Yangel Herrera	0	0	0	0	0	0	0	0
22	MF	(Colombia) COL	Jhon Solís	0	0	0	0	0	0	0	0
23	MF	(Spain) ESP	Iván Martín	0	0	0	0	0	0	0	0
Forwards
7	FW	(Uruguay) URU	Cristhian Stuani	0	0	0	0	0	0	0	0
8	MF	(Ukraine) UKR	Viktor Tsyhankov	0	0	0	0	0	0	0	0
9	FW	(Spain) ESP	Abel Ruiz	0	0	0	0	0	0	0	0
11	FW	(Netherlands) NED	Arnaut Danjuma	0	0	0	0	0	0	0	0
19	FW	(North Macedonia) MKD	Bojan Miovski	0	0	0	0	0	0	0	0
20	FW	(Spain) ESP	Bryan Gil	0	0	0	0	0	0	0	0
24	FW	(Spain) ESP	Portu	0	0	0	0	0	0	0	0
27	FW	(Netherlands) NED	Gabriel Misehouy	0	0	0	0	0	0	0	0
Players transferred out during the season
