= Dawda Camara =

Mauritanian footballer

Personal information
- Full name: Dawda Camara Sankharé
- Date of birth: 4 November 2002 (age 24)
- Place of birth: Banyoles, Spain
- Height: 1.90 m (6 ft 3 in)
- Position: Forward

Team information
- Current team: Alverca

Youth career
- 2009–2014: Porqueres
- 2014–2021: Girona

Senior career*
Years	Team	Apps	(Gls)
2021–2025	Girona B	96	(24)
2021–2026	Girona	5	(0)
2025–2026	→ Cádiz (loan)	34	(4)
2026–	Alverca	0	(0)

International career^{‡}
2026–	Mauritania	1	(1)
- * Club domestic league appearances and goals as of 22 August 2026 ‡ National team caps and goals as of 24 September 2026

Dawda Camara Sankharé (born 4 November 2002) is a professional footballer who plays as a forward for Portuguese club F.C. Alverca. Born in Spain, he represents the Mauritania national team.

== Club career ==
Born in Banyoles, Girona, Catalonia, Camara joined Girona FC's youth setup in 2014, from UE Porqueres. He made his senior debut with the reserves on 10 January 2021, coming on as a late substitute for Adrián Turmo in a 0–0 Tercera División home draw against Cerdanyola del Vallès FC.

Camara scored his first senior goal on 5 September 2021, netting the B's second in a 2–1 away win over CE L'Hospitalet. He made his first team debut on 8 November, replacing Jordi Calavera late into a 1–2 away loss against CD Tenerife in the Segunda División championship.

On 4 April 2023, Camara suffered a serious knee injury, returning to action after ten months. He was a regular starter for the B-side during the 2024–25 season, scoring a career-best 11 goals as they achieved promotion to Segunda Federación.

On 23 August 2025, Camara renewed his contract until 2027 and was definitely promoted to the main squad. He made his La Liga debut the following day, starting in a 5–0 away loss to Villarreal CF.

On 1 September 2025, Camara was loaned to second division side Cádiz CF for the season. He scored his first professional goal on 7 December, netting the opener in a 3–2 home loss to Racing de Santander.

Back to Girona in July 2026, Camara still featured for the squad now also in division two, before moving to Primeira Liga side F.C. Alverca on 1 September.

== International career ==
Born in Spain, Camara is of Mauritanian descent. He was called up to the Mauritania national team for matches in June 2022.

== Personal life ==
Camara's older brother Sile was also a footballer. He mainly represented CD Banyoles, UE Figueres and UE Llagostera before becoming a manager; the duo also worked together at Porqueres.

== Career statistics ==
=== Club ===
As of match played 22 August 2026

Appearances and goals by club, season and competition
Club	Season	League			Copa del Rey		Other		Total	
Club	Season	Division	Apps	Goals	Apps	Goals	Apps	Goals	Apps	Goals
Girona B	2020–21	Tercera División	10	0	—		—		10	0
Girona B	2021–22	Tercera División RFEF	25	5	—		2 (Note: Appearance(s) in Tercera Federación promotion play-offs)	0	27	5
Girona B	2022–23	Tercera Federación	22	10	—		—		22	10
Girona B	2023–24	Tercera Federación	12	3	—		—		12	3
Girona B	2024–25	Tercera Federación	25	6	—		6	5	31	11
Girona B	Total		94	24	—		8	5	102	29
Girona	2021–22	Segunda División	1	0	1	1	—		2	1
Girona	2022–23	La Liga	0	0	0	0	—		0	0
Girona	2024–25	La Liga	0	0	0	0	1 (Note: Appearances in Copa Catalunya)	0	1	0
Girona	2025–26	La Liga	2	0	0	0	—		2	0
Girona	2026–27	Segunda División	2	0	0	0	—		2	0
Girona	Total		5	0	1	1	1	0	7	1
Cádiz (loan)	2025–26	Segunda División	34	4	2	1	—		36	5
Career total			133	28	3	2	9	5	145	35

=== International goals ===
List of international goals scored by Dawda Camara
No.	Date	Venue	Opponent	Score	Result	Competition
1.	24 September 2026	Larbi Zaouli Stadium, Casablanca, Morocco	Central African Republic	2–1	3–1	2027 Africa Cup of Nations qualification
