= Bryan Gil =

Spanish footballer (born 2001)

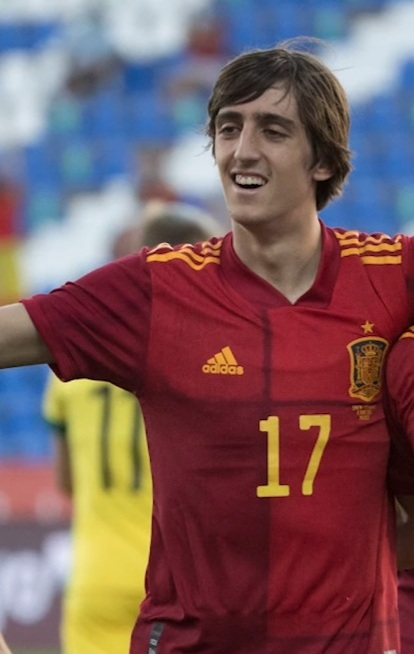
- Gil playing for Spain in 2021

Personal information
- Full name: Bryan Gil Salvatierra
- Date of birth: 11 February 2001 (age 25)
- Place of birth: L'Hospitalet de Llobregat, Spain
- Height: 1.75 m (5 ft 9 in)
- Positions: Winger; wide midfielder

Team information
- Current team: Girona
- Number: 21

Youth career
- Barbate
- 2012–2018: Sevilla

Senior career*
Years	Team	Apps	(Gls)
2018–2019	Sevilla B	23	(4)
2019–2021	Sevilla	14	(1)
2020	→ Leganés (loan)	12	(1)
2020–2021	→ Eibar (loan)	28	(4)
2021–2025	Tottenham Hotspur	24	(0)
2022	→ Valencia (loan)	13	(0)
2023	→ Sevilla (loan)	17	(2)
2024–2025	→ Girona (loan)	25	(3)
2025–	Girona	37	(1)

International career
2017	Spain U16	3	(1)
2017–2018	Spain U17	11	(0)
2018	Spain U18	4	(0)
2019–2020	Spain U19	14	(1)
2020–2022	Spain U21	14	(4)
2021	Spain U23	6	(0)
2021–2024	Spain	5	(1)
Medal record
Representing Spain
Men's Football
UEFA Nations League
Runner-up	2021 Italy
Olympic Games
Silver medal – second place	2020 Tokyo	Team
- * Club domestic league appearances and goals as of 19:53, 18 October 2026 (UTC)

Bryan Gil Salvatierra (born 11 February 2001) is a Spanish professional footballer who plays as a winger or wide midfielder for Segunda División club Girona and the Spain national team.

Gil began his professional career at Sevilla, and also had loan spells with Leganés, Eibar and Valencia in La Liga, totalling 67 games and six goals. In 2021, he joined Tottenham Hotspur for an initial £21.6 million fee. In September 2025 he signed for Girona FC.

Gil won a silver medal at the 2020 Olympics with Spain's under-23 team. He made his senior international debut in 2021.

== Club career ==
=== Sevilla ===
Born in L'Hospitalet de Llobregat, Barcelona, Catalonia, Gil and his family moved to Barbate, Andalusia when he was a young child and he was mainly raised there. In 2012, he joined Sevilla FC's youth academy setup, moving there from his hometown side Barbate CF. Promoted to the reserves ahead of the 2018–19 season, he made his senior debut on 26 August 2018, starting in a 0–1 Segunda División B home loss against UD Ibiza.

Gil scored his first senior goal on 8 September 2018, scoring the equaliser in a 2–1 home win against San Fernando CD. On 12 December, already a consistent starter for the B-side, he renewed his contract until 2022. On 23 February 2019, he was given a straight red card in a 2–1 win at Granada CF B, and two teammates were also sent off for arguing the dismissal.

Gil made his first team – and La Liga – debut on 6 January 2019, coming on as a late substitute for goalscorer Wissam Ben Yedder in a 1–1 home draw against Atlético Madrid. He made ten more appearances – all off the bench – in his first season for the team, and scored on 25 April to conclude a 5–0 win over Rayo Vallecano at the Ramón Sánchez Pizjuán Stadium; the strike made him the first child of the 21st century to net in Spain's top flight.

On 29 November 2019, Gil scored his first goal in European competition when he scored in a UEFA Europa League game against Qarabağ FK which ended 2–0 in favour of Sevilla. The following 31 January, he moved to fellow top-tier side CD Leganés on loan for the remainder of the season. On 19 July 2020, Gil scored against Real Madrid in a 2–2 home draw on the final day of the season.

Gil was loaned to fellow top-tier side SD Eibar for the 2020–21 campaign on 5 October 2020, along with teammate Alejandro Pozo. He scored four goals and assisted as many, as the team ended the season relegated.

=== Tottenham Hotspur ===
Gil signed for Tottenham Hotspur at the beginning of the 2021–22 season in a fee part-exchange deal with Argentine Erik Lamela heading to Sevilla. Sky Sports reported the initial fee of £21.6 million, and the contract length was for five years.

Gil made his debut for the club on 19 August 2021 by starting in the UEFA Europa Conference League first leg tie against Paços de Ferreira, which ended in a 1–0 defeat. Ten days later, he made his Premier League debut in a 1–0 home win over Watford as an 88th-minute replacement for goalscorer Son Heung-min. His progress was limited by a thigh injury against Burnley in October, followed by a COVID-19 diagnosis in December.

Having played just 85 minutes over nine league games, Gil was linked to a move back to La Liga in January 2022, to either Real Sociedad or Valencia. On the last day of the month, he was loaned to the latter for the remainder of the season. He made 17 total appearances for the club, including their penalty shootout defeat to Real Betis in the 2022 Copa del Rey Final on 23 April, in which he came on for goalscorer Hugo Duro with five minutes of regulation time remaining.

On 30 January 2023, having made 11 appearances for Tottenham mainly as a substitute in the first half of the season – including winning a penalty and praise from manager Antonio Conte in the Champions League against Eintracht Frankfurt – Gil was loaned back to Sevilla for its remainder. Twelve days later, in his second game back and first start, he scored to conclude a 2–0 home win over RCD Mallorca. In his time at Tottenham, Gil got one assist and zero goals in competitive games, with both goals scored occurring in pre-season games/ friendlies.

=== Girona ===
On 29 July 2024, Gil returned to Spain on another loan, but to Catalonia-based Girona instead. On 1 September 2025, he signed a permanent five-year deal with the club.

== International career ==
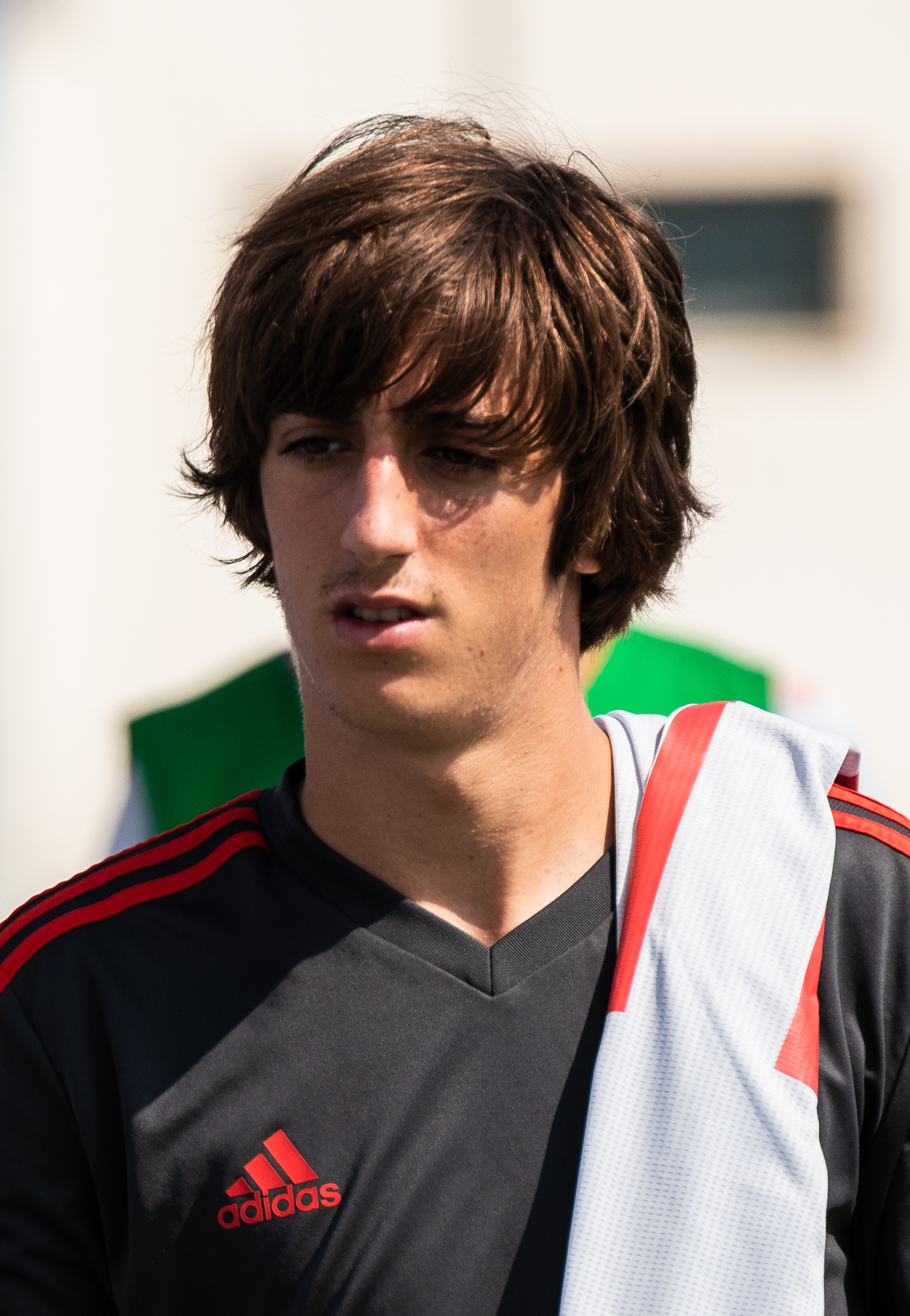
Gil with Spain U19 in 2019

Gil was a member of the Spain under-19 team that won the 2019 UEFA European Championship in Armenia, starting in the 2–0 final win over neighbours Portugal.

In March 2021, Gil received his first call-up to the Spain national team for the group stage of the 2022 FIFA World Cup qualification. He made his debut on 25 March 2021 against Greece, as a 65th-minute substitute for Sergio Canales in a 1–1 draw in Granada.

Gil won a silver medal at the 2020 Olympic tournament in Japan, delayed until the following year due to the COVID-19 pandemic.

In March 2023, Gil was recalled to the senior team by new manager Luis de la Fuente, despite only having 269 minutes of La Liga game time at Sevilla.

== Career statistics ==
=== Club ===
As of match played 18 October 2026

Appearances and goals by club, season and competition
Club	Season	League			National cup (Note: Includes Copa del Rey, FA Cup)		League cup (Note: Includes EFL Cup)		Europe		Other		Total	
Club	Season	Division	Apps	Goals	Apps	Goals	Apps	Goals	Apps	Goals	Apps	Goals	Apps	Goals
Sevilla B	2018–19	Segunda División B	23	4	—		—		—		—		23	4
Sevilla	2018–19	La Liga	11	1	2	0	—		0	0	0	0	13	1
Sevilla	2019–20	La Liga	2	0	1	0	—		4 (Note: Appearances in UEFA Europa League)	1	—		7	1
Sevilla	2020–21	La Liga	1	0	0	0	—		0	0	0	0	1	0
Sevilla	Total		14	1	3	0	—		4	1	0	0	21	2
Leganés (loan)	2019–20	La Liga	12	1	—		—		—		—		12	1
Eibar (loan)	2020–21	La Liga	28	4	1	0	—		—		—		29	4
Tottenham Hotspur	2021–22	Premier League	9	0	1	0	4	0	6 (Note: Appearances in UEFA Europa Conference League)	0	—		20	0
Tottenham Hotspur	2022–23	Premier League	4	0	2	0	1	0	4 (Note: Appearances in UEFA Champions League)	0	—		11	0
Tottenham Hotspur	2023–24	Premier League	11	0	1	0	0	0	—		—		12	0
Tottenham Hotspur	Total		24	0	4	0	5	0	10	0	—		43	0
Valencia (loan)	2021–22	La Liga	13	0	4	0	—		—		—		17	0
Sevilla (loan)	2022–23	La Liga	17	2	—		—		7	0	—		24	2
Girona (loan)	2024–25	La Liga	25	3	1	1	—		6	0	—		32	4
Girona	2025–26	La Liga	29	0	1	0	—		—		—		30	0
Girona	2026–27	Segunda División	8	1	0	0	—		—		—		8	1
Girona	Girona total		62	4	2	1	—		6	0	—		70	5
Career total			193	16	14	1	5	0	27	1	0	0	239	18

=== International ===
As of match played 18 November 2024

Appearances and goals by national team and year
National team	Year	Apps	Goals
Spain	2021	4	0
Spain	2022	0	0
Spain	2023	0	0
Spain	2024	1	1
Total		5	1

As of match played 18 November 2024
Scores and results list Spain's goal tally first, score column indicates score after each Bryan Gil goal

List of international goals scored by Bryan Gil
No.	Date	Venue	Cap	Opponent	Score	Result	Competition
1	18 November 2024	Estadio Heliodoro Rodríguez López, Santa Cruz de Tenerife, Spain	5	Switzerland	2–1	3–2	2024–25 UEFA Nations League A

== Honours ==
Sevilla

- UEFA Europa League: 2019–20, 2022–23

Spain U19

- UEFA European Under-19 Championship: 2019

Spain U23

- Summer Olympics silver medal: 2020

Spain

- UEFA Nations League runner-up: 2020–21
