= Portu =

Spanish footballer (born 1992)

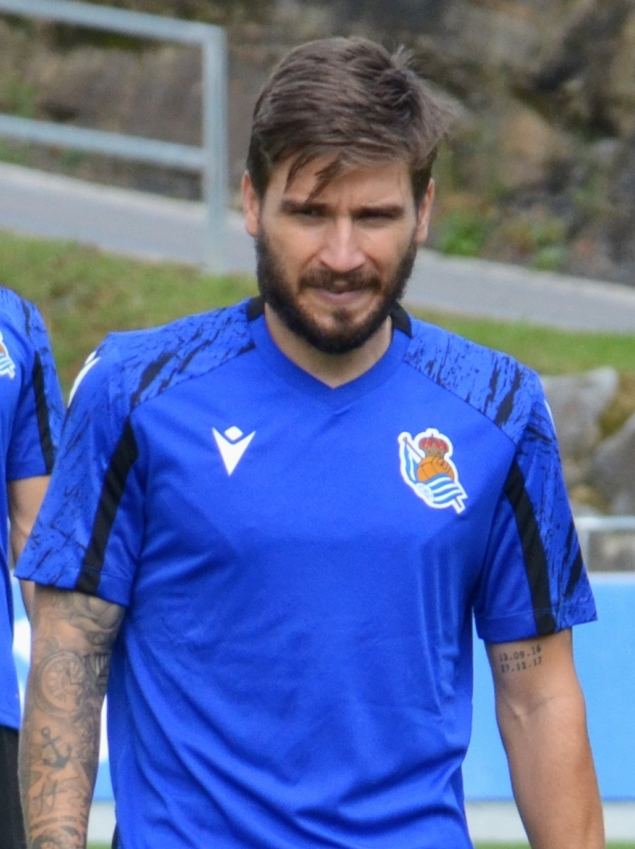
- Portu training with Real Sociedad in 2021

Personal information
- Full name: Cristian Portugués Manzanera
- Date of birth: 21 May 1992 (age 34)
- Place of birth: Beniel, Spain
- Height: 1.67 m (5 ft 6 in)
- Position: Winger

Team information
- Current team: Girona
- Number: 10

Youth career
- 1996–1999: Beniel
- 1999–2007: Murcia
- 2007–2009: Valencia

Senior career*
Years	Team	Apps	(Gls)
2009–2014	Valencia B	129	(5)
2014	Valencia	1	(0)
2014–2016	Albacete	75	(12)
2016–2019	Girona	112	(28)
2019–2023	Real Sociedad	109	(16)
2022–2023	→ Getafe (loan)	34	(0)
2023	Getafe	3	(0)
2023–	Girona	72	(8)

International career
2009	Spain U17	5	(0)
- * Club domestic league appearances and goals as of 18:26, 18 October 2026 (UTC)

Cristian Portugués Manzanera (Spanish pronunciation: [ˈkɾistjam poɾtuˈɣes manθaˈneɾa]; (Note: In isolation, Cristian is pronounced [ˈkɾistjan].) born 21 May 1992), commonly known as Portu ([ˈpoɾtu]), is a Spanish professional footballer who plays as a winger for Segunda División club Girona.

He played 288 La Liga games and scored 44 goals, in service of Valencia, Girona (two spells), Real Sociedad and Getafe, winning the Copa del Rey with the third of those clubs in 2019–20.

== Club career ==
=== Valencia ===
Born in Beniel, Region of Murcia, Portu played as a child at local Beniel and Real Murcia before moving to Valencia's youth system in 2009. He made his senior debut with the reserves at only 17, going on to spend several seasons with the side in the Segunda División B as well as one in the Tercera División; in January 2012, he was called up by first-team manager Unai Emery due to a string of injuries.

Portu played his first official game with the Che's main squad on 27 February 2014, coming on as a late substitute for fellow youth graduate Federico Cartabia in a 0–0 home draw against Dynamo Kyiv in the round of 32 of the UEFA Europa League. His maiden appearance in La Liga came three days later, as he started and was booked in a 1–0 away loss to Rayo Vallecano.

=== Albacete ===
On 11 July 2014, it was announced that Valencia had sold Portu to Segunda División club Albacete with a buy-back option. He scored his first professional goals on 18 October, netting a brace but in a 3–2 defeat at Mirandés.

=== Girona ===
On 21 June 2016, after Alba's relegation, Portu signed a three-year deal with Girona also in the second tier. He scored eight goals (also providing eight assists) in his first season, helping the Catalans to a first ever top-flight promotion.

Portu bettered that total to 11 the following campaign, as Girona easily retained their league status. Highlights included the winner in a 2–1 comeback victory against Real Madrid on 29 October 2017, and a brace to ensure a 2–2 draw at Real Betis on 25 November. The following 24 February, he took three minutes to give his side a lead away to neighbours Barcelona, albeit in a 6–1 loss.

In 2018–19, Portu contributed nine goals but suffered relegation.

=== Real Sociedad ===
On 18 June 2019, Real Sociedad announced via their Twitter account that they had reached a preliminary agreement for the transfer of Portu for a fee of €10 million; the five-year contract was confirmed the same day. He scored his first goal for his new team on 29 September, in a 3–2 away loss to Sevilla.

On 3 April 2021, the club from San Sebastián won their first major trophy since 1987, lifting the Copa del Rey in the delayed 2020 final against local rivals Athletic Bilbao. Portu was fouled by Iñigo Martínez, from which Mikel Oyarzabal scored the game's only goal from the penalty spot.

=== Getafe ===
On 21 June 2022, Portu joined Getafe on loan with an option to buy. Exactly one year later, he signed a permanent three-year contract.

=== Girona return ===
On 1 September 2023, Girona announced the return of Portu on a four-year deal. He scored in his first appearance two days later, the game's only goal at home against Las Palmas. On 4 May 2024, within a minute of coming on as a substitute when his team trailed Barcelona 2–1 at home, he scored an equaliser; he then netted a long-range volley to secure a 4–2 victory and the club's first qualification for the UEFA Champions League, while handing the league title to Real Madrid.

Portu suffered an anterior cruciate ligament injury in November 2025 during training, being lost for the remainder of the season.

== Career statistics ==
As of match played 27 October 2026

Appearances and goals by club, season and competition
Club	Season	League			Copa del Rey		Europe		Other		Total	
Club	Season	Division	Apps	Goals	Apps	Goals	Apps	Goals	Apps	Goals	Apps	Goals
Valencia B	2009–10	Segunda División B	3	0	—		—		—		3	0
Valencia B	2010–11	Tercera División	25	1	—		—		—		25	1
Valencia B	2011–12	Segunda División B	33	2	—		—		—		33	2
Valencia B	2012–13	Segunda División B	34	1	—		—		—		34	1
Valencia B	2013–14	Segunda División B	34	1	—		—		2 (Note: Appearances in Segunda División B relegation play-offs)	0	36	1
Valencia B	Total		129	5	0	0	—		2	0	131	5
Valencia	2013–14	La Liga	1	0	0	0	1 (Note: Appearances in UEFA Europa League)	0	—		2	0
Albacete	2014–15	Segunda División	36	6	3	0	—		—		39	6
Albacete	2015–16	Segunda División	39	6	1	0	—		—		40	6
Albacete	Total		75	12	4	0	—		0	0	79	12
Girona	2016–17	Segunda División	41	8	0	0	—		—		41	8
Girona	2017–18	La Liga	37	11	0	0	—		—		37	11
Girona	2018–19	La Liga	34	9	3	1	—		—		36	10
Girona	Total		112	28	3	1	—		0	0	115	29
Real Sociedad	2019–20	La Liga	35	7	6 (Note: Includes appearance in 2020 Copa del Rey final (played in 2021))	0	—		0	0	41	7
Real Sociedad	2020–21	La Liga	37	8	1	0	8	1	1 (Note: Appearance in Supercopa de España)	0	47	9
Real Sociedad	2021–22	La Liga	37	1	5	1	7	0	—		49	2
Real Sociedad	Total		109	16	12	1	15	1	1	0	137	18
Getafe (loan)	2022–23	La Liga	34	0	3	0	—		—		37	0
Girona	2023–24	La Liga	33	7	5	1	—		—		38	8
Girona	2024–25	La Liga	27	1	1	0	5 (Note: Appearances in UEFA Champions League)	0	—		33	1
Girona	2025–26	La Liga	10	0	1	0	—		—		11	0
Girona	2026–27	Segunda División	2	0	1	0	—		—		3	0
Girona	Total		72	8	8	1	5	0	—		85	9
Career total			532	69	30	3	21	1	3	0	586	73

== Honours ==
Real Sociedad

- Copa del Rey: 2019–20
