= Iván Martín (footballer, born 1999) =

Spanish footballer (born 1999)

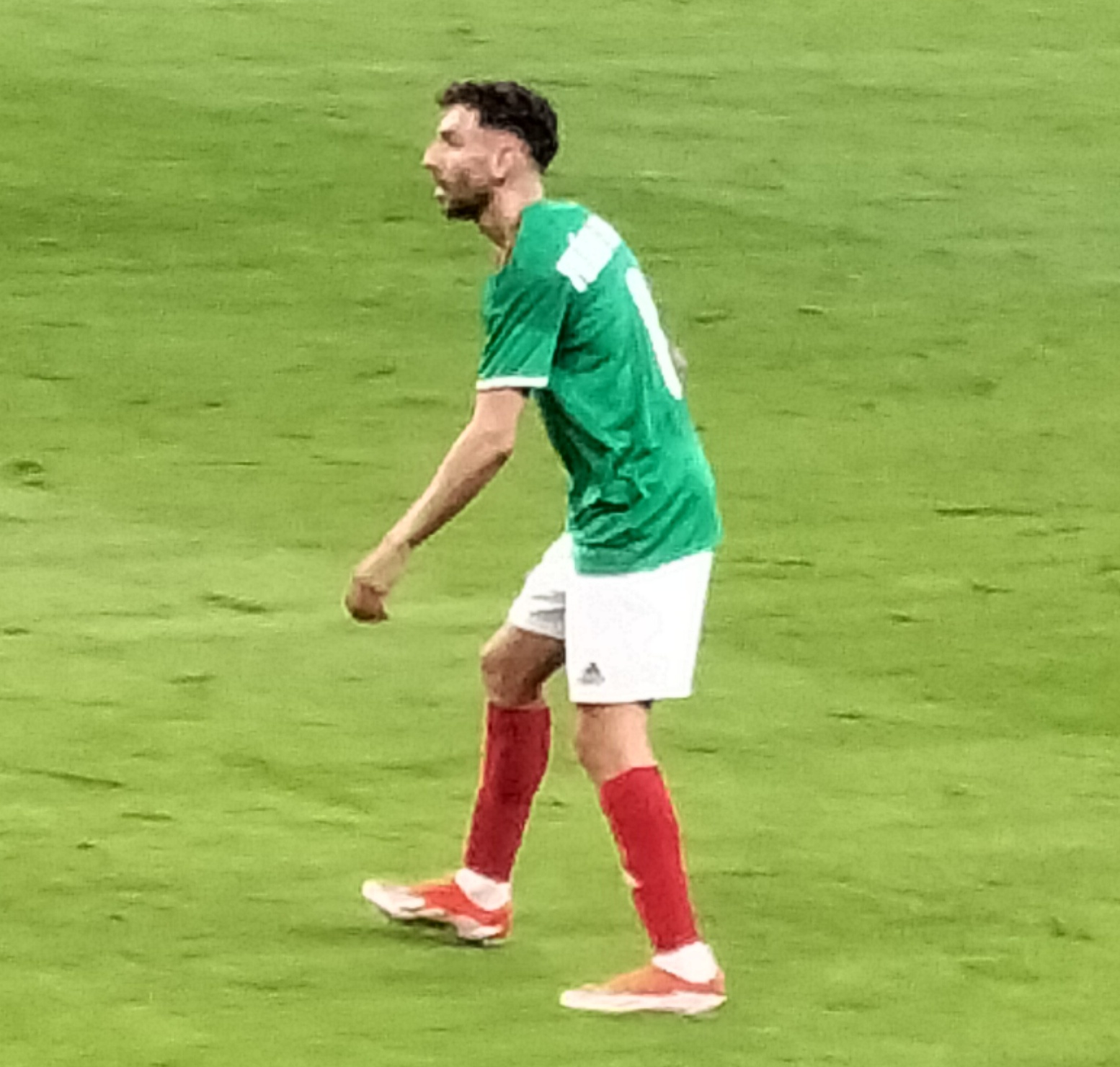

Personal information
- Full name: Iván Martín Núñez
- Date of birth: 14 February 1999 (age 27)
- Place of birth: Bilbao, Spain
- Height: 1.78 m (5 ft 10 in)
- Position: Midfielder

Team information
- Current team: Racing Santander
- Number: 23

Youth career
- Torre Pacheco
- 2012–2017: Villarreal

Senior career*
Years	Team	Apps	(Gls)
2017–2018	Villarreal C	33	(3)
2018–2020	Villarreal B	60	(0)
2019–2023	Villarreal	0	(0)
2020–2021	→ Mirandés (loan)	33	(4)
2021–2022	→ Alavés (loan)	6	(0)
2022–2023	→ Girona (loan)	39	(3)
2023–2026	Girona	103	(6)
2026–	Racing Santander	5	(0)

International career^{‡}
2014–2015	Spain U16	9	(2)
2015–2016	Spain U17	10	(0)
2017	Spain U18	2	(2)
2018	Spain U19	2	(1)
2024–	Basque Country	1	(0)
- * Club domestic league appearances and goals as of 20 September 2026 ‡ National team caps and goals as of 24 March 2024

Iván Martín Núñez (born 14 February 1999) is a Spanish professional footballer who plays as a midfielder for La Liga club Racing Santander.

== Club career ==
Martín was born in Bilbao, Biscay, Basque Country, but was raised in Torre Pacheco, Murcia. He moved to Villarreal CF in February 2012, from lowly locals EF Torre Pacheco, and was promoted to the C-team ahead of the 2017–18 campaign, in Tercera División.

Martín made his senior debut on 27 August 2017, starting in a 0–0 away draw against Crevillente Deportivo. He scored his first goal the following 21 January, netting the winner in a 2–1 away defeat of CD Roda.

Martín was promoted to the reserves in August 2018, also becoming a regular starter for the side. He made his first team debut the following 17 January, coming on as a late substitute for fellow youth graduate Alfonso Pedraza in a 1–3 loss at RCD Espanyol, for the season's Copa del Rey.

On 14 August 2020, Martín was loaned to Segunda División side CD Mirandés for the season. He scored his first professional goal on 19 September, netting the opener in a 1–1 home draw against Real Oviedo.

On 10 July 2021, Martín moved to La Liga side Deportivo Alavés, on a one-year loan deal. The following 27 January, after featuring rarely, he moved to Girona in the second level, also in a temporary deal.

In July 2022, after helping the Catalans to achieve promotion to the top tier, Martín's loan was extended for a further year; he would, however, spend the first months of the new campaign nursing a fibula injury. On 22 July 2023, he signed a permanent three-year contract with the club.

On 3 January 2024, Martín scored the winning goal for Girona in stoppage time in a 4–3 victory over Atlético Madrid, to be his club's first ever win against the latter. On 20 August 2026, after the club's relegation, he joined Racing de Santander in the top tier on a four-year deal.

== International career ==
Martín was called up to the Basque Country national team for a friendly match against Palestine on 15 November 2025.

== Career statistics ==
As of match played 16 August 2026

Appearances and goals by club, season and competition
Club	Season	League			National cup		Europe		Other		Total	
Club	Season	Division	Apps	Goals	Apps	Goals	Apps	Goals	Apps	Goals	Apps	Goals
Villarreal B	2018–19	Segunda División B	33	0	—		—		2 (Note: Appearances in Segunda División B promotion play-offs)	0	35	0
Villarreal B	2019–20	Segunda División B	27	0	—		—		—		27	0
Villarreal B	Total		60	0	—		—		2	0	62	0
Villarreal	2018–19	La Liga	0	0	1	0	—		—		1	0
Villarreal	2019–20	La Liga	0	0	0	0	—		—		0	0
Villarreal	Total		0	0	1	0	—		—		1	0
Mirandés (loan)	2020–21	Segunda División	33	4	0	0	—		—		33	4
Alavés (loan)	2021–22	La Liga	6	0	2	0	—		—		8	0
Girona (loan)	2021–22	Segunda División	15	0	0	0	—		4 (Note: Appearances in Segunda División promotion play-offs)	0	19	0
Girona (loan)	2022–23	La Liga	24	3	2	0	—		—		26	3
Girona (loan)	Total		39	3	2	0	—		4	0	45	3
Girona	2023–24	La Liga	36	5	4	0	—		—		40	5
Girona	2024–25	La Liga	32	1	1	0	6 (Note: Appearances in UEFA Champions League)	0	—		39	1
Girona	2025–26	La Liga	34	0	2	0	—		—		36	0
Girona	2026–27	Segunda División	1	0	—		—		—		1	0
Girona	Total		103	6	7	0	6	0	—		116	6
Career total			217	13	10	0	6	0	6	0	239	13
