= Yáser Asprilla =

Colombian footballer (born 2003)

Personal information
- Full name: Yáser Esnéider Asprilla Martínez
- Date of birth: 19 November 2003 (age 22)
- Place of birth: Bajo Baudó, Chocó, Colombia
- Height: 1.76 m (5 ft 9 in)
- Positions: Attacking midfielder; winger

Team information
- Current team: Girona
- Number: 22

Youth career
- –2020: Envigado

Senior career*
Years	Team	Apps	(Gls)
2020–2022	Envigado	40	(6)
2022–2024	Watford	81	(7)
2024–	Girona	52	(9)
2026	→ Galatasaray (loan)	7	(0)

International career^{‡}
2023	Colombia U20	4	(2)
2022–	Colombia	14	(2)
Medal record
Men's football
Representing Colombia
Copa América
Runner-up	2024 United States
- * Club domestic league appearances and goals as of 24 October 2026 (UTC) ‡ National team caps and goals as of 6 October 2026 (UTC)

Yáser Esnéider Asprilla Martínez (born 19 November 2003) is a Colombian professional footballer who plays as an attacking midfielder or winger for Segunda División club Girona and the Colombia national team.

A product of the Envigado academy, Asprilla made his professional debut in 2020 and agreed a move to English club Watford the following year. Unable to obtain a UK work permit immediately, he spent the first half of 2022 back on loan at Envigado before joining Watford, where he was named the club's Young Player of the Season for 2023–24. In August 2024 he joined La Liga club Girona for a reported club-record fee, and played in the UEFA Champions League in his first season in Spain. He spent the second half of the 2025–26 season on loan at Galatasaray, where he won the Süper Lig, before returning to a Girona side that had been relegated in his absence.

At youth level, Asprilla helped Colombia reach the quarter-finals of the 2023 FIFA U-20 World Cup. He made his senior international debut in January 2022, aged 18, and was a member of the squad that finished as runner-up at the 2024 Copa América.

== Early life ==
Originally from Bajo Baudó, in the Chocó Department on Colombia's Pacific coast, Asprilla moved as a young child with his parents and siblings to the Tienda Nueva area of Palmira, in the Valle del Cauca Department, where he began playing football at a local school. As a young child he moved with his parents and siblings to the Tienda Nueva area of Palmira, in the Valle del Cauca Department, where he began playing football at a local school. Envigado's scouts noticed him at a youth tournament, and at the age of 11 he joined the club's academy, living in its residence for young players while completing his development. He is not related to the former Colombia international Faustino Asprilla.

== Club career ==
=== Envigado ===
Asprilla made his professional debut for Envigado on 2 December 2020, as a substitute in a 3–0 Categoría Primera A defeat to Independiente Medellín. On 18 July 2021, in the opening round of the Torneo Finalización, he came off the bench against Atlético Nacional, set up Envigado's first goal and scored a 66th-minute equaliser in a 2–2 draw; it was his first professional goal, and he was named man of the match. He established himself in the side under coach Alberto Suárez during the second half of the 2021 season, and by January 2022 had scored five goals in 22 professional matches, against opponents including Atlético Nacional and Millonarios.

=== Watford ===
Asprilla agreed to join Watford in August 2021, and Envigado confirmed the transfer on 17 January 2022. According to Envigado's president, Watford paid a little over US$2.5 million for 80 per cent of his economic rights, with Envigado retaining the remainder. As he did not yet meet the points threshold for a UK work permit, he was loaned back to Envigado for the first half of 2022, and helped the club reach the semi-final group stage of the Apertura. He linked up with Watford at the club's pre-season training camp in Austria in July 2022.

Asprilla made his Watford debut as a substitute in a 1–0 Championship win over Burnley on 12 August 2022, early in the 2022–23 season, and made his first start four days later in a 1–1 draw at Birmingham City, after which head coach Rob Edwards described his display as "really promising". He scored his first goal for the club with a low 18-yard shot on 7 April 2023, in a 3–2 home defeat to Huddersfield Town. He made 39 appearances in a season in which Watford were managed successively by Edwards, Slaven Bilić and Chris Wilder.

Under Valérien Ismaël in 2023–24, Asprilla initially featured mainly from the bench, scoring a late winner against Sheffield Wednesday in October 2023; Ismaël said at the time that the player had the necessary quality but needed "consistency at a high level". On 28 November, he completed a comeback from two goals down against Norwich City by rounding the goalkeeper to score the winner in a 3–2 victory, and in the return fixture on 13 February 2024 he scored an equaliser from 30 yards in a 4–2 defeat at Carrow Road. He followed it with the winning goal against Rotherham United in his next match. He started all but one of Watford's final 14 matches of the season, and finished the campaign with six goals and a team-high seven Championship assists. He was named Watford's Young Player of the Season and finished second in the supporters' vote for the Graham Taylor Player of the Season award.

Asprilla was left out of Watford's squads at the start of the 2024–25 season, with head coach Tom Cleverley later saying that he had expected the player to leave and had planned without him. He left the club having scored seven goals in 86 appearances, almost half of them as a substitute.

=== Girona ===
On 23 August 2024, Asprilla joined La Liga club Girona on a contract running until 2030. The fee was undisclosed, but was reported as €18 million plus add-ons, making him the most expensive signing in Girona's history. Watford retained a 35 per cent sell-on clause. He made his debut six days later, replacing Abel Ruiz in the 73rd minute of a 4–0 home win over Osasuna, and on 18 September made his Champions League debut as a substitute in Girona's 1–0 defeat to Paris Saint-Germain in the league phase. He scored his first goal for Girona on 6 October 2024, opening the scoring in a 2–1 win over Athletic Bilbao in his eighth appearance for the club. In February 2025, he came off the bench to score a 79th-minute winner against Las Palmas that ended a run of four consecutive defeats. He made six Champions League appearances and scored three league goals during the 2024–25 season, though head coach Míchel later said that handing him the number 10 shirt on arrival had been a mistake.

Asprilla's playing time was limited in the first half of the 2025–26 season. His only goal came in the Copa del Rey on 3 December 2025, when he scored the rebound after his own penalty had been saved, in a 2–1 second-round defeat away to Ourense CF.

=== Loan to Galatasaray ===
On 25 January 2026, Asprilla joined Süper Lig club Galatasaray on loan until the end of the season, with an option to buy at Galatasaray's discretion; no loan fee was paid. He made his debut on 1 February, replacing Noa Lang in the 73rd minute of a 4–0 home win over Kayserispor, and started two Turkish Cup matches in February and March. He was registered in Galatasaray's squad for the Champions League knockout phase but did not play. A knee injury sustained against Göztepe in April interrupted his spell, and on 9 May Galatasaray won the 2025–26 Süper Lig, their fourth consecutive league title and Asprilla's first. Galatasaray did not exercise the purchase option, and he returned to Girona after nine appearances without a goal. In his absence, Girona had been relegated from La Liga on the final day of the season.

=== Return to Girona ===
Asprilla remained at Girona for the 2026–27 Segunda División season under Quique Álvarez. He scored an 85th-minute goal in a 2–1 defeat away to Córdoba on 21 August 2026, and eight days later came on as a substitute to score twice in a 5–2 home win over Las Palmas. He was named Girona's player of the month for August. On 5 September, he opened the scoring with a chip in a 2–0 win away to Sporting de Gijón, a goal that took him to the top of the division's scoring chart.

== International career ==
=== Youth ===
Asprilla was left out of Colombia's squad for the 2023 South American U-20 Championship, which the country hosted, after Watford declined to release him. He was selected for the 2023 FIFA U-20 World Cup in Argentina, where he scored a 53rd-minute equaliser in a 2–1 group-stage win over Japan that secured Colombia's place in the round of 16. He scored again with a long-range shot in the round-of-16 win over Slovakia, and started the quarter-final, which Colombia lost 3–1 to Italy in San Juan on 3 June. He finished the tournament with two goals in four appearances.

=== Senior ===
Asprilla was called up to the senior team by Reinaldo Rueda while still an Envigado player, and made his debut on 16 January 2022 in a friendly against Honduras at DRV PNK Stadium in Fort Lauderdale, replacing Juan Fernando Quintero in the 42nd minute of a 2–1 win. Aged 18 years and 58 days, he became the second-youngest player to represent Colombia. In his second international appearance, on 24 September 2022, he came on as a substitute against Guatemala at the Red Bull Arena in Harrison, New Jersey, and scored in the final minutes to make it 4–0, in Néstor Lorenzo's first match as head coach; Guatemala scored a stoppage-time consolation.

On 26 March 2024, Asprilla came off the bench against Romania at the Metropolitano Stadium in Madrid and scored Colombia's third goal in a 3–2 friendly win, the country's first victory over Romania. He was named in Lorenzo's 26-man squad for the 2024 Copa América in the United States, and made one appearance, as a second-half substitute in a 3–0 group-stage win over Costa Rica on 28 June, as Colombia went on to finish runners-up to Argentina.

Asprilla returned to the national team in November 2025, appearing as a substitute in a 2–1 friendly win over New Zealand and starting a 3–0 win over Australia in New York three days later. He was included in the 55-man preliminary list for the 2026 FIFA World Cup but was not selected for the final 26-man squad. In September 2026, he was recalled for friendlies against Mexico, Paraguay and Peru.

== Style of play ==
Asprilla is a left-footed attacking player who has most often been deployed on the right wing, from where he cuts inside onto his stronger foot, but he can also play on the left or as a playmaker behind the striker. He is known for his ability in one-on-one situations, his close control and his shooting from the edge of the penalty area; Míchel credited him with "spectacular" talent in one-on-one duels. Four of his goals for Watford were scored from outside the box, and in 2023–24 he created 75 chances, the most of any Watford player. His under-15 coach at Envigado, Wilberth Perea, said that Ronaldinho had been a model for him, and identified his tactical understanding and defensive work as the areas in which he still needed to develop.

== Career statistics ==
=== Club ===
As of match played 24 October 2026

Appearances and goals by club, season and competition
Club	Season	League			National cup		League cup		Continental		Total	
Club	Season	Division	Apps	Goals	Apps	Goals	Apps	Goals	Apps	Goals	Apps	Goals
Envigado	2020	Categoría Primera A	2	0	—		—		—		2	0
Envigado	2021	Categoría Primera A	20	5	—		—		—		20	5
Envigado	Total		22	5	—		—		—		22	5
Watford	2022–23	Championship	37	1	1	0	1	0	—		39	1
Watford	2023–24	Championship	44	6	3	0	0	0	—		47	6
Watford	Total		81	7	4	0	1	0	—		86	7
Envigado (loan)	2022	Categoría Primera A	18	1	—		—		—		18	1
Girona	2024–25	La Liga	27	3	0	0	—		6 (Note: Appearances in UEFA Champions League)	0	33	3
Girona	2025–26	La Liga	15	0	2	1	—		—		17	1
Girona	2026–27	Segunda División	10	6	0	0	—		—		10	6
Girona	Total		52	9	2	1	—		6	0	60	10
Galatasaray (loan)	2025–26	Süper Lig	7	0	2	0	0	0	—		9	0
Career total			180	22	8	1	1	0	6	0	195	23

=== International ===
As of match played 6 October 2026

Appearances and goals by national team and year
National team	Year	Apps	Goals
Colombia	2022	2	1
Colombia	2023	1	0
Colombia	2024	5	1
Colombia	2025	3	0
Colombia	2026	3	0
Total		14	2

Scores and results list Colombia's goal tally first, score column indicates score after each Asprilla goal.

List of international goals scored by Yáser Asprilla
No.	Date	Venue	Opponent	Score	Result	Competition
1	24 September 2022	Red Bull Arena, Harrison, United States	Guatemala	4–0	4–1	Friendly
2	26 March 2024	Metropolitano Stadium, Madrid, Spain	Romania	3–0	3–2	Friendly

== Honours ==
Galatasaray

- Süper Lig: 2025–26

Colombia

- Copa América runner-up: 2024

Individual

- Watford Young Player of the Season: 2023–24
