= 2025–26 Girona FC season =

Girona FC
2025–26 season
- President: Delfí Geli
- Head coach: Míchel
- Stadium: Estadi Montilivi
- La Liga: 19th (relegated)
- Copa del Rey: Second round
- Top goalscorer: League: Vladyslav Vanat (9); All: Vladyslav Vanat (10)
- Biggest win: Girona 3–0 Athletic Bilbao
- Biggest defeat: Villarreal 5–0 Girona
colours	Away colours	Third colours

The 2025–26 season was the 96th season in the history of Girona Futbol Club, and the club's fourth consecutive season in La Liga. In addition to the domestic league, the club participated in the Copa del Rey.

== Players ==
=== First team squad ===
As of 5 April 2026

Note: Flags indicate national team as defined under FIFA eligibility rules; some limited exceptions apply. Players may hold more than one non-FIFA nationality.

No.	Pos.	Nation	Player
1	GK	ESP	Rubén Blanco
2	DF	ESP	Hugo Rincón (on loan from Athletic Bilbao)
3	FW	ESP	Joel Roca
4	DF	ESP	Arnau Martínez (4th captain)
5	DF	ESP	David López
6	MF	NED	Donny van de Beek
7	FW	URU	Cristhian Stuani (captain)
8	MF	ESP	Fran Beltrán
9	FW	ESP	Abel Ruiz
10	FW	ESP	Portu (vice-captain)
11	MF	FRA	Thomas Lemar (on loan from Atlético Madrid)
12	DF	BRA	Vitor Reis (on loan from Manchester City)
13	GK	ARG	Paulo Gazzaniga

No.	Pos.	Nation	Player
14	MF	ARG	Claudio Echeverri (on loan from Manchester City)
15	MF	UKR	Viktor Tsyhankov
16	DF	ESP	Alejandro Francés
17	DF	NED	Daley Blind
18	MF	MAR	Azzedine Ounahi
19	FW	UKR	Vladyslav Vanat
20	MF	BEL	Axel Witsel
21	FW	ESP	Bryan Gil
22	GK	GER	Marc-André ter Stegen (on loan from Barcelona)
23	MF	ESP	Iván Martín (3rd captain)
24	DF	ESP	Àlex Moreno
25	GK	UKR	Vladyslav Krapyvtsov
—	GK	ESP	Juan Carlos

=== Reserve team ===
Note: Flags indicate national team as defined under FIFA eligibility rules; some limited exceptions apply. Players may hold more than one non-FIFA nationality.

No.	Pos.	Nation	Player
27	DF	ESP	Pol Arnau
28	DF	ESP	Gibert Jordana
29	MF	GUI	Lass Kourouma
30	MF	ESP	Javi Sarasa
31	DF	ESP	Antonio Salguero

No.	Pos.	Nation	Player
32	FW	VEN	Juan Arango
36	MF	ESP	Ricard Artero
43	GK	BUL	Aleksandar Andreev
44	MF	SEN	Papa Ba

=== Out on loan ===
Note: Flags indicate national team as defined under FIFA eligibility rules; some limited exceptions apply. Players may hold more than one non-FIFA nationality.

No.	Pos.	Nation	Player
—	GK	ESP	Toni Fuidias (at Gimnàstic until 30 June 2026)
—	DF	HUN	Antal Yaakobishvili (at Tenerife until 30 June 2026)
—	DF	CZE	Ladislav Krejčí (at Wolverhampton Wanderers until 30 June 2026)
—	MF	NED	Gabriel Misehouy (at Aris until 30 June 2026)
—	MF	COL	Jhon Solís (at Birmingham City until 30 June 2026)

No.	Pos.	Nation	Player
—	FW	POR	Jastin García (at Andorra until 30 June 2026)
—	FW	KOR	Kim Min-su (at Andorra until 30 June 2026)
—	FW	MTN	Dawda Camara (at Cádiz until 30 June 2026)
—	FW	COL	Yáser Asprilla (at Galatasaray until 30 June 2026)

== Transfers ==
=== In ===
Pos.	Player	Transferred from	Fee	Date	Source
MF	(Spain) Joel Roca	(Spain) Mirandés	Loan return	30 June 2025	
DF	(Spain) Hugo Rincón	(Spain) Athletic Bilbao	Loan	29 July 2025	
DF	(Brazil) Vitor Reis	(England) Manchester City	Loan	8 August 2025	
MF	(Morocco) Azzedine Ounahi	(France) Marseille	€6,000,000	30 August 2025	
MF	(Spain) Bryan Gil	(England) Tottenham Hotspur	€6,000,000	1 September 2025	
FW	(Ukraine) Vladyslav Vanat	(Ukraine) Dynamo Kyiv	€17,000,000	1 September 2025	
MF	(Argentina) Claudio Echeverri	(England) Manchester City	Loan	18 January 2026	
MF	(Spain) Fran Beltrán	(Spain) Celta Vigo	€150,000	20 January 2026	
GK	(Spain) Rubén Blanco	Unattached	Free	10 February 2026	

=== Out ===
Pos.	Player	Transferred to	Fee	Date	Source
MF	(Spain) Bryan Gil	(England) Tottenham Hotspur	Loan return	30 June 2025	
MF	(Colombia) Jhon Solís	(England) Birmingham City	Loan	17 January 2026	
MF	(Colombia) Yáser Asprilla	(Turkey) Galatasaray	Loan	25 January 2026	

== Pre-season and friendlies ==
26 July 2025 Friendly	Girona (Spain)	0–2	(France) Marseille
20:00

30 July 2025 Friendly	Alavés (Spain)	0–1	(Spain) Girona
18:15			Asprilla 43'

3 August 2025 Friendly	Girona (Spain)	2–1	(England) Wolverhampton Wanderers
20:00

9 August 2025 Friendly	Napoli (Italy)	3–2	(Spain) Girona
19:00

== Competitions ==
=== Overall record ===
Competition	First match	Last match	Starting round	Final position	Record							
Competition	First match	Last match	Starting round	Final position	Pld	W	D	L	GF	GA	GD	Win %
La Liga	15 August 2025	23 May 2026	Matchday 1	19th	38	9	14	15	39	55	−16	23.68
Copa del Rey	28 October 2025	3 December 2025	First round	Second round	2	1	0	1	4	4	+0	50.00
Copa Catalunya	23 July 2025		Final	Winners	1	0	1	0	0	0	+0	0.00
Total					41	10	15	16	43	59	−16	24.39

Source: Competitions

=== La Liga ===
==== League table ====
Pos	Team	Pld	W	D	L	GF	GA	GD	Pts	Qualification or relegation
16	Levante	38	11	9	18	47	61	−14	42 (Note: Head-to-head points: Levante 7, Osasuna 5, Mallorca 3.)	
17	Osasuna	38	11	9	18	44	50	−6	42	
18	Mallorca (R)	38	11	9	18	47	57	−10	42	Relegation to Segunda División
19	Girona (R)	38	9	14	15	39	55	−16	41	Relegation to Segunda División
20	Real Oviedo (R)	38	6	11	21	26	60	−34	29	Relegation to Segunda División

Source: LaLiga EA Sports
Rules for classification: 1) Points; 2) Head-to-head points; 3) Head-to-head goal difference; 4) Goal difference; 5) Goals scored; 6) Fair-play points
(Note: Head-to-head record is used only after all the matches between the teams in question have been played)
(R) Relegated

==== Results by round ====
Round	1	2	3	4	5	6	7	8	9	10	11	12	13	14	15	16	17	18	19	20	21	22	23	24	25	26	27	28	29	30	31	32	33	34	35	36	37	38
Ground	H	A	H	A	H	A	H	H	A	H	A	H	A	H	A	A	H	A	H	A	H	A	A	H	A	H	A	H	A	H	A	A	H	H	A	H	A	H
Result	L	L	L	D	L	D	D	W	L	D	L	W	D	D	L	W	L	W	W	W	D	L	D	W	D	L	D	W	L	W	D	L	L	L	D	D	L	D
Position	17	20	20	20	20	20	20	18	20	20	20	18	18	18	18	18	18	17	13	11	10	12	12	12	11	14	15	12	13	12	11	12	15	16	16	15	18	19

A = Away; H = Home; W = Win; D = Draw; L = Loss

==== Matches ====
15 August 2025 1	Girona	1–3	Rayo Vallecano	Girona
19:00				Stadium: Estadi Montilivi

24 August 2025 2	Villarreal	5–0	Girona	Villarreal
19:30

30 August 2025 3	Girona	0–2	Sevilla	Girona
19:30				Stadium: Estadi Montilivi

14 September 2025 4	Celta Vigo	1–1	Girona	Vigo
14:00

20 September 2025 5	Girona	0–4	Levante	Girona
14:00				Stadium: Estadi Montilivi

23 September 2025 6	Athletic Bilbao	1–1	Girona	Bilbao
19:00

26 September 2025 7	Girona	0–0	Espanyol	Girona
21:00				Stadium: Estadi Montilivi

4 October 2025 8	Girona	2–1	Valencia	Girona
16:15				Stadium: Estadi Montilivi

18 October 2025 9	Barcelona	2–1	Girona	Barcelona
16:15

25 October 2025 10	Girona	3–3	Oviedo	Girona
14:00				Stadium: Estadi Montilivi

31 October 2025 11	Getafe	2–1	Girona	Getafe
21:00

8 November 2025 12	Girona	1–0	Alavés	Girona
14:00				Stadium: Estadi Montilivi

23 November 2025 13	Real Betis	1–1	Girona	Seville
16:15

30 November 2025 14	Girona	1–1	Real Madrid	Girona
21:00				Stadium: Estadi Montilivi

7 December 2025 15	Elche	3–0	Girona	Elche
14:00

12 December 2025 16	Real Sociedad	1–2	Girona	San Sebastián
21:00

21 December 2025 17	Girona	0–3	Atlético Madrid	Girona
14:00				Stadium: Estadi Montilivi

4 January 2026 18	Mallorca	1–2	Girona	Palma
18:30

10 January 2026 19	Girona	1–0	Osasuna	Girona
18:30				Stadium: Estadi Montilivi

16 January 2026 20	Espanyol	0–2	Girona	Cornellà de Llobregat
21:00

26 January 2026 21	Girona	1–1	Getafe	Girona
21:00				Stadium: Estadi Montilivi

31 January 2026 22	Oviedo	1–0	Girona	Oviedo
14:00

8 February 2026 23	Sevilla	1–1	Girona	Seville
16:15

16 February 2026 24	Girona	2–1	Barcelona	Girona
21:00				Stadium: Estadi Montilivi

23 February 2026 25	Alavés	2–2	Girona	Vitoria-Gasteiz
21:00

1 March 2026 26	Girona	1–2	Celta Vigo	Girona
21:00				Stadium: Estadi Montilivi

7 March 2026 27	Levante	1–1	Girona	Valencia
16:15

14 March 2026 28	Girona	3–0	Athletic Bilbao	Girona
14:00				Stadium: Estadi Montilivi

21 March 2026 29	Osasuna	1–0	Girona	Pamplona
18:30

6 April 2026 30	Girona	1–0	Villarreal	Girona
21:00				Stadium: Estadi Montilivi

10 April 2026 31	Real Madrid	1–1	Girona	Madrid
21:00

21 April 2026 33	Girona	2–3	Real Betis	Girona
21:30				Stadium: Estadi Montilivi

25 April 2026 32	Valencia	2–1	Girona	Valencia
18:30

1 May 2026 34	Girona	0–1	Mallorca	Girona
21:00				Stadium: Estadi Montilivi

11 May 2026 35	Rayo Vallecano	1–1	Girona	Madrid
21:00

14 May 2026 36	Girona	1–1	Real Sociedad	Girona
20:00				Stadium: Estadi Montilivi

17 May 2026 37	Atlético Madrid	1–0	Girona	Madrid
19:00

23 May 2026 38	Girona	1–1	Elche	Girona
21:00				Stadium: Estadi Montilivi

=== Copa del Rey ===
28 October 2025 First round	Constància	2–3 (a.e.t.)	Girona
19:00

3 December 2025 Second round	Ourense CF	2–1	Girona	Ourense
21:00	Yuste 1'; Ouhdadi 64'	Report	Asprilla 25'	Stadium: Estadio de O Couto; Referee: Alejandro José Hernández Hernández

=== Copa Catalunya ===
23 July 2025 Final	Espanyol	0–0 (4–5 p)	Girona
19:00
