= Papa Dame Ba =

Senegalese footballer

Personal information
- Full name: Papa Dame Ba
- Date of birth: 19 April 2004 (age 22)
- Place of birth: Thiès, Senegal
- Height: 1.80 m (5 ft 11 in)
- Position: Winger

Team information
- Current team: Logroñés (on loan from Girona)

Youth career
- Keur Madior

Senior career*
Years	Team	Apps	(Gls)
2021–2024	Keur Madior		
2024–2026	Girona B	72	(13)
2024–	Girona	1	(0)
2026–	→ Logroñés (loan)	0	(0)
- * Club domestic league appearances and goals as of 15 May 2026

Pape Dame Ba (born 19 April 2004) is a Senegalese professional footballer who plays mainly as a right winger for Spanish club UD Logroñés, on loan from Girona FC.

== Club career ==
Born in Thiès, Ba made his senior debut with local side Keur Madior FC in the Ligue 2 in 2021. On 24 January 2024, he moved abroad and joined La Liga side Girona FC, being initially assigned to the reserves in Tercera Federación.

Ba made his professional – and La Liga – debut with the Catalans on 26 October 2024, coming on as a first-half substitute for injured Alejandro Francés in a 1–0 away loss to UD Las Palmas. He finished the season as a regular starter for the B's, scoring seven goals in 36 appearances overall as the side achieved promotion to Segunda Federación.

On 30 August 2026, Ba was loaned to Primera Federación side UD Logroñés, for one year.

== International career ==
In July 2022, Ba was called up to the Senegal national under-20 team.

== Career statistics ==
As of 31 August 2026

Appearances and goals by club, season and competition
Club	Season	League			National cup		Europe		Other		Total	
Club	Season	Division	Apps	Goals	Apps	Goals	Apps	Goals	Apps	Goals	Apps	Goals
Girona B	2023–24	Tercera Federación	17	2	—		—		—		17	2
Girona B	2024–25	Tercera Federación	30	7	—		—		6 (Note: Appearances in Tercera Federación play-offs)	0	36	7
Girona B	2025–26	Segunda Federación	25	4	—		—		—		25	4
Girona B	Total		72	13	—		—		6	0	78	13
Girona	2024–25	La Liga	1	0	1	0	0	0	—		2	0
Girona	2025–26	La Liga	0	0	2	0	—		—		2	0
Girona	Total		1	0	3	0	0	0	—		4	0
Career total			73	13	3	0	0	0	6	0	82	13
