= Daley Blind =

Dutch footballer (born 1990)

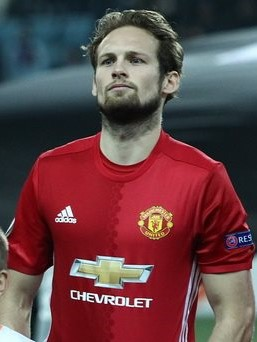
- Blind playing for Manchester United in 2016

Personal information
- Full name: Daley Blind
- Date of birth: 9 March 1990 (age 36)
- Place of birth: Amsterdam, Netherlands
- Height: 1.80 m (5 ft 11 in)
- Positions: Centre-back; left-back; defensive midfielder

Team information
- Current team: Ajax
- Number: 17

Youth career
- 1995–1998: Amsterdamsche FC
- 1998–2008: Ajax

Senior career*
Years	Team	Apps	(Gls)
2008–2014	Ajax	102	(3)
2010	→ Groningen (loan)	17	(0)
2014–2018	Manchester United	90	(4)
2018–2023	Ajax	124	(7)
2023	Bayern Munich	4	(0)
2023–2026	Girona	99	(1)
2026–	Ajax	1	(0)

International career
2004	Netherlands U15	1	(0)
2006	Netherlands U16	4	(0)
2006–2007	Netherlands U17	13	(3)
2007–2009	Netherlands U19	16	(0)
2009–2013	Netherlands U21	23	(0)
2013–2024	Netherlands	108	(3)
Medal record
Men's football
Representing Netherlands
FIFA World Cup
Third place	2014 Brazil	Team
UEFA European Championship
Bronze medal – third place	2024 Germany	Team
UEFA Nations League
Runner-up	2019 Portugal	Team
- * Club domestic league appearances and goals as of 25 October 2026

Daley Blind (Dutch pronunciation: [ˈdeːli ˈblɪnt]; born 9 March 1990) is a Dutch professional footballer who plays for Eredivisie club Ajax. A versatile player, he has been deployed as a left-back, centre-back, and defensive midfielder. He is the son of former Ajax defender and former Netherlands national team manager Danny Blind.

Blind rose through the youth ranks at Ajax, becoming a regular after a loan to Groningen, and won four consecutive Eredivisie titles with the club. In September 2014, he transferred to Manchester United for £13.8 million, where he was part of the team that won four trophies including the FA Cup, EFL Cup and UEFA Europa League. In the summer of 2018, Blind returned to Ajax, where he won his fifth Eredivisie title and a first-ever KNVB Cup in his first season back at the club. He won two more Eredivisie titles before moving to Bayern Munich, where he won the Bundesliga during a six-month spell. Blind signed for Spanish club Girona in 2023, before returning for a third stint with Ajax in 2026.

A full Netherlands international from 2013 to 2024, Blind earned over 100 caps, and was a member of the Dutch squad that finished third at the 2014 FIFA World Cup. He then went on to feature at UEFA Euro 2020, the 2022 World Cup and Euro 2024.

== Club career ==
=== Ajax ===
Blind began his career in the youth academy of his hometown club, Ajax; the same club where his father Danny made his name as a professional. Blind is a product of the Ajax youth system and, while officially still a B-junior, he became a mainstay in the A-juniors during the 2007–08 season before earning promotion to the Ajax first-team for the 2008–09 season. He showed good promise as a youngster and was made captain of Jong Ajax in 2007. He signed his first professional contract at the age of 17, tying him to the club until 1 July 2010.

On 7 December 2008, Blind made his debut in the Ajax first-team in the away match against FC Volendam. Blind made an immediate impact when he forced a corner kick through a Volendam defender, from which Jan Vertonghen scored the winning goal for Ajax. On 19 December 2008, he signed a contract extension keeping him with Ajax until 30 June 2013.

==== Loan to Groningen ====
On 5 January 2010, he joined Groningen on loan for the remainder of the 2009–10 season, during the winter transfer window. At Groningen, Blind was mainly used as a right back. He was almost sold to Groningen for €1.5 million by Ajax on a permanent basis but the move did not materialize.

==== Back from loan spell ====
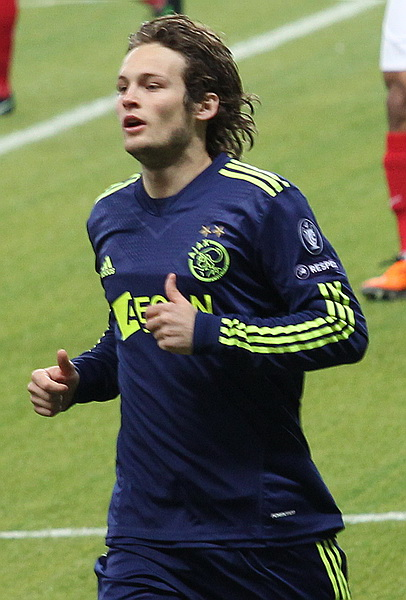
Blind playing for Ajax in 2011

The following two seasons saw Blind contribute to two Eredivisie national championships with Ajax, for the 2010–11 season, and the 2011–12 season, the first of which would be Ajax's 30th championship title. However, Blind's performances when given the chance were unconvincing and he was even booed off the field in an Eredivisie game. Under newly appointed manager Frank de Boer, Blind would be given more and more trust and playing time, earning him the place as the first-choice left-back with a permanent starting position during the 2012–13 season.

On 23 April 2013, it was announced by Marc Overmars that Ajax and Blind had reached an agreement to extend his contract for three years, binding him to the club until the summer of 2016. On 5 May, Blind contributed to Ajax's third Dutch title in a row, marking the club's 32nd national title, helping to defeat Willem II 5–0 at home, and securing the top position on the table just one match day from season's end. Later that day it was announced that Blind had been declared AFC Ajax Player of the Year for the 2012–13 season, after playing an outstanding fifth year for Ajax, from the starting left-back position.

During the 2013–14 season, De Boer moved Blind back to his natural defensive central midfielder position and was named Dutch Footballer of the Year as Ajax won a fourth consecutive league title.

=== Manchester United ===
On 30 August 2014, Manchester United reached an agreement to sign Blind, subject to a medical and agreement of personal terms. The transfer was completed on 1 September 2014, for a fee of £13.8 million.

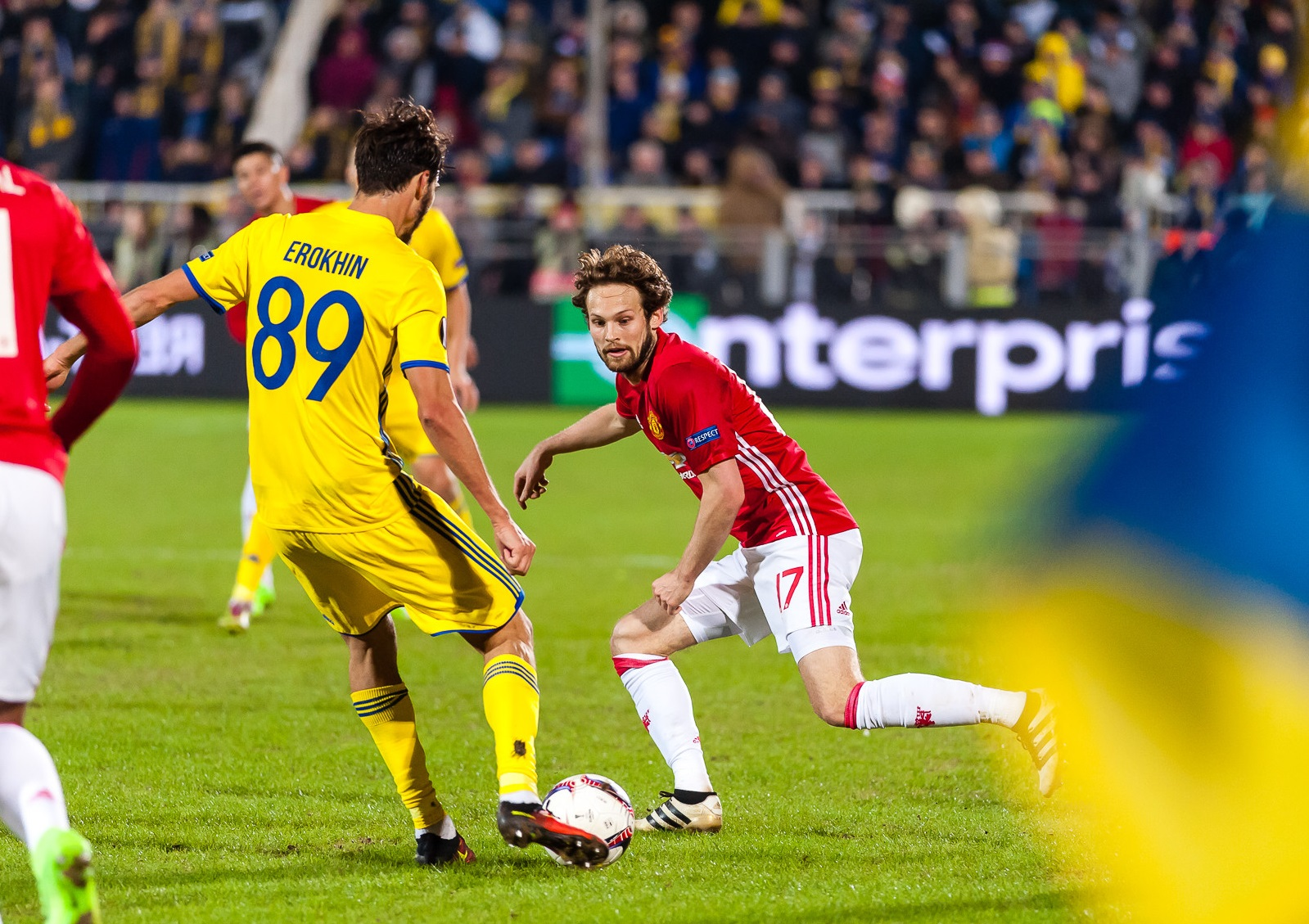
Blind playing for Manchester United in 2017

Blind made his debut 13 days after his signing, playing the full 90 minutes as United beat Queens Park Rangers 4–0 at Old Trafford for their first victory of the season. His first goal for the club came on 20 October, a 20-yard strike that earned United a 2–2 draw at West Bromwich Albion.

On 16 November, Blind sustained a knee ligament injury in the Netherlands' UEFA Euro 2016 qualifier against Latvia which kept him out of the Manchester United team for the remainder of 2014. On 11 January 2015, Blind returned to the United team, starting in defence in a 1–0 loss to Southampton at Old Trafford. On 8 February, he scored an injury-time equaliser for United in a 1–1 draw against West Ham.

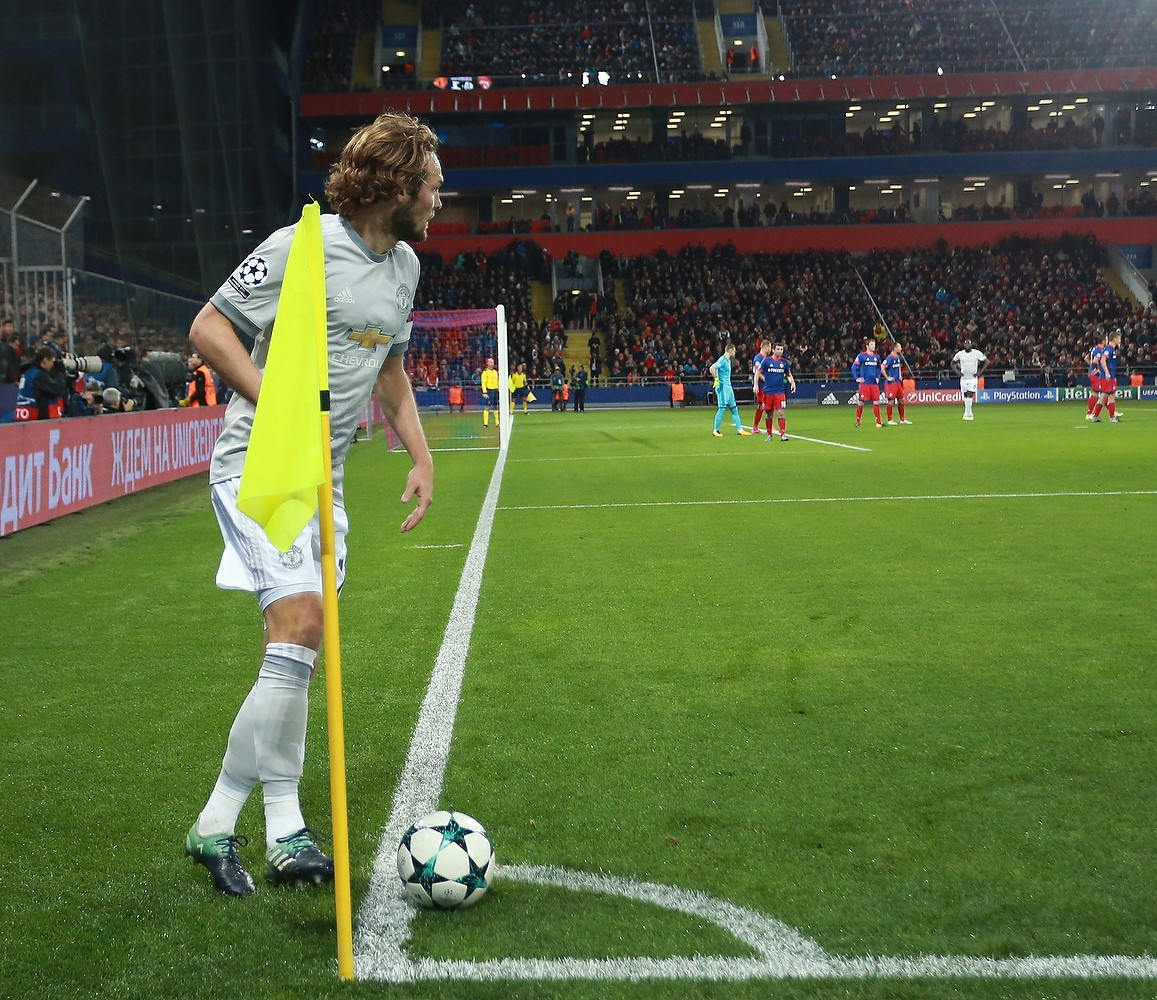
Blind taking a corner for Manchester United in the 2017–18 UEFA Champions League

Although throughout the previous season Blind was used as a defensive midfielder or left-back, Blind started the season as a centre-back, where he played for the majority of the season. On 12 September 2015, he scored his first goal of the season in a 3–1 win against Liverpool at Old Trafford, also being named man of the match for his performance.

He began the 2016–17 Premier League season as first-choice centre-back alongside Chris Smalling; however, he lost his place in the team following a return to form for Phil Jones and Marcos Rojo. He worked his way back to the first team, but featured mostly at left-back, replacing first-choice left-back Luke Shaw. He scored his first goal of the season against Sunderland on Boxing Day, charging into the box to connect with a pass from Zlatan Ibrahimović and finishing low into the bottom corner. He started the Europa League final against his former team Ajax, which Manchester United won 2–0.

=== Return to Ajax ===
On 17 July 2018, both Manchester United and Ajax announced they had agreed a transfer for Blind to return to Ajax for a four-year deal and a fee of €16 million with conditional add-ons. On 16 December 2018, Blind scored his first senior hat-trick, in an 8–0 league win over De Graafschap at home, whilst playing as a centre-back.

In August 2020, Blind collapsed during a pre-season friendly and was due for medical exams before returning to training.

On 27 December 2022, Blind and Ajax mutually terminated his contract and Blind left the club as a free agent.

=== Bayern Munich ===
On 5 January 2023, Blind joined Bundesliga club Bayern Munich on a contract until the end of the season.

=== Girona ===
On 7 July 2023, Blind joined La Liga club Girona on a two-year contract. On 12 August 2023, he made his debut for the club in a 1–1 draw against Real Sociedad. On 3 January 2024, Blind scored his first goal for Girona in a 4–3 win over Atlético Madrid. It was the club's first ever league victory over Atlético and the result ensured that Girona would be equal on points with Real Madrid at the top of the table at the halfway point of the La Liga season. On 15 May 2024, Girona announced that Blind had received a one-year contract extension, keeping him with the club until June 2026.

=== Third spell at Ajax ===
On 8 July 2026, Blind joined Ajax for a third time, signing a one-year contract.

== International career ==
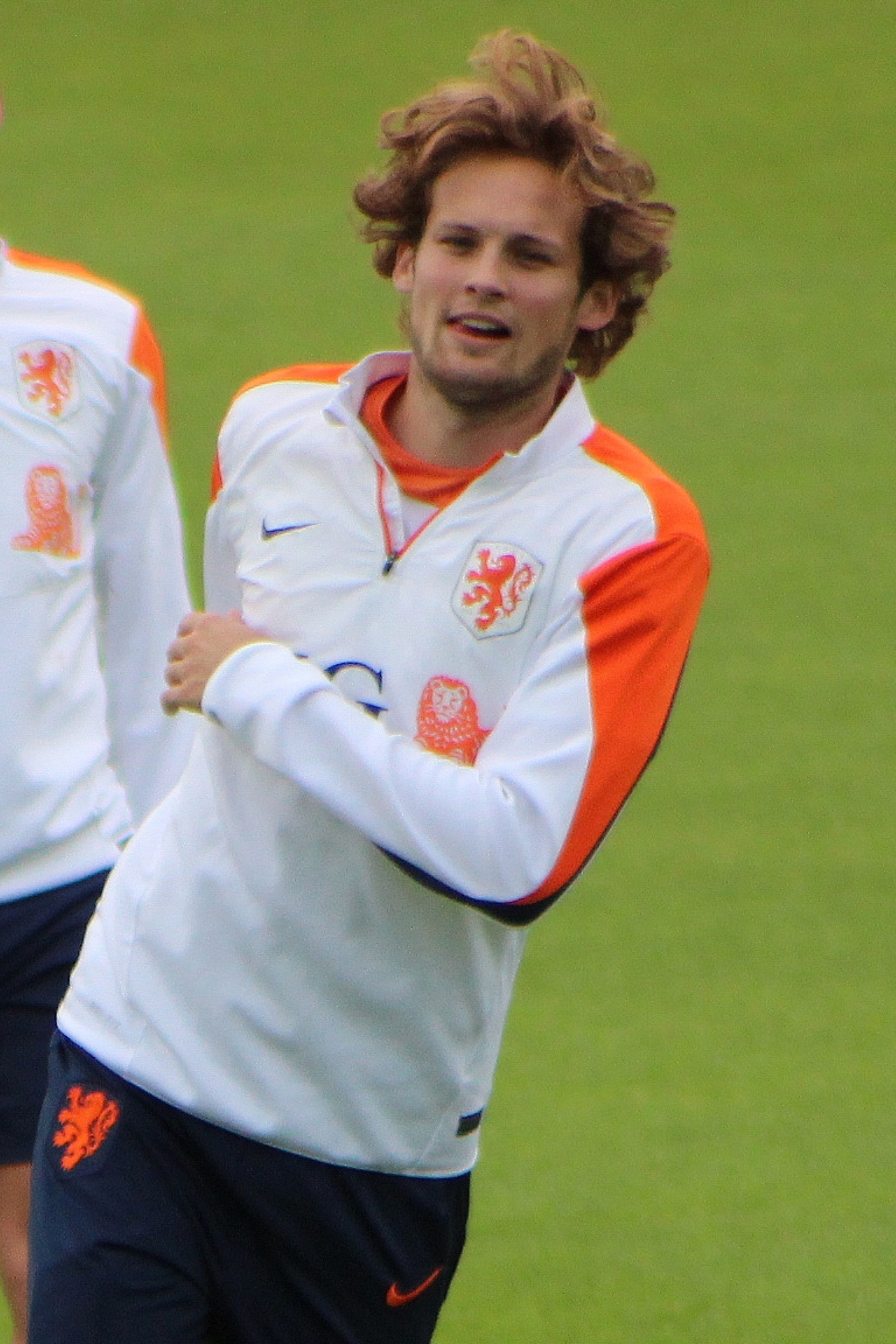
Blind training with the Netherlands national team in 2014

=== Youth ===
Blind was called up to the Netherlands under-17 squad for 2007 European Championships. After missing out the opening match through suspension, he scored a brace against Iceland in the second match but picked up an ankle injury in that match that ended his participation in the remainder of the tournament. He was called up to the under-21 team for several 2011 European Championship qualifiers but did not leave the bench. On 13 October, he made his first appearance in the campaign, coming on as a substitute for Ajax teammate Siem de Jong in a 4–0 win away at Poland.

=== Senior ===
Having had previous call-ups, Blind made his debut for the Netherlands senior team on 6 February 2013, in the starting left-back position, against Italy in a friendly at the Amsterdam Arena. The match ended in a 1–1 draw, with Blind playing the full 90 minutes. In June 2014, he was selected in the Netherlands squad for the 2014 FIFA World Cup. He was a starter at left wing back for the team's opening match against Spain, assisting goals for Robin van Persie and Arjen Robben, as Oranje won 5–1. He scored his first goal for the Netherlands in a 3–0 defeat of Brazil in the third-place play-off. He would later score in a friendly against Mexico later that year. After the team had failed to qualify for both UEFA Euro 2016 and the 2018 FIFA World Cup, Blind was included in the Netherlands squad for the 2019 UEFA Nations League Finals, where he started at left back in both the semi-final win against England and final loss to Portugal. He was selected for teams played in the UEFA Euro 2020 and 2022 FIFA World Cup. He scored his first goal for the Netherlands in eight years in the latter competition's round of 16 win over the United States. On 24 March 2023, Blind played his 100th match for the Netherlands in a 4–0 away defeat against France during the UEFA Euro 2024 qualifying.

After initially being cut from the Netherlands' squad for the 2023 UEFA Nations League Finals, Blind was recalled as a replacement for the injured Matthijs de Ligt on 12 June 2023. He was an unused substitute against both Croatia in the semi-final and Italy in the third place play-off.

On 29 May 2024, Blind was named in the Netherlands' squad for UEFA Euro 2024. On 14 August, it was announced that Blind retired from international football with 108 caps.

== Personal life ==
He is the son of former Ajax defender and former Netherlands national team manager Danny Blind. His wife gave birth to their son in March 2019.

On 21 December 2019, it was revealed Blind had been diagnosed with myocarditis, and had been fitted with an implantable cardioverter-defibrillator.

== Career statistics ==
=== Club ===
As of match played 25 October 2026

Appearances and goals by club, season and competition
Club	Season	League			National cup (Note: Includes KNVB Cup, FA Cup, DFB-Pokal, Copa del Rey)		League cup (Note: Includes Football League/EFL Cup)		Europe		Other		Total	
Club	Season	Division	Apps	Goals	Apps	Goals	Apps	Goals	Apps	Goals	Apps	Goals	Apps	Goals
Ajax	2008–09	Eredivisie	5	0	0	0	—		1 (Note: Appearance in UEFA Cup)	0	—		6	0
Ajax	2009–10	Eredivisie	0	0	0	0	—		0	0	—		0	0
Ajax	2010–11	Eredivisie	10	0	4	0	—		4 (Note: Appearances in UEFA Europa League)	0	0	0	18	0
Ajax	2011–12	Eredivisie	21	0	1	0	—		3 (Note: Two appearances in UEFA Champions League, one appearance in UEFA Europa League)	0	1 (Note: Appearance in Johan Cruyff Shield)	0	26	0
Ajax	2012–13	Eredivisie	34	2	3	0	—		8 (Note: Six appearances in UEFA Champions League, two appearances in UEFA Europa League)	0	1	0	46	2
Ajax	2013–14	Eredivisie	29	1	6	0	—		8	0	1	0	44	1
Ajax	2014–15	Eredivisie	3	0	0	0	—		0	0	0	0	3	0
Ajax	Total		102	3	14	0	—		24	0	3	0	143	3
Groningen (loan)	2009–10	Eredivisie	17	0	0	0	—		—		2 (Note: Appearances in Eredivisie European play-offs)	0	19	0
Jong Ajax	2009–10	Beloften Eredivisie	0	0	1	0	—		—		—		1	0
Jong Ajax	2013–14	Eerste Divisie	1	0	—		—		—		—		1	0
Jong Ajax	Total		1	0	1	0	—		—		—		2	0
Manchester United	2014–15	Premier League	25	2	4	0	0	0	—		—		29	2
Manchester United	2015–16	Premier League	35	1	7	1	2	0	12 (Note: Eight appearances in UEFA Champions League, four appearances in UEFA Europa League)	0	—		56	2
Manchester United	2016–17	Premier League	23	1	1	0	3	0	11	0	1 (Note: Appearance in FA Community Shield)	0	39	1
Manchester United	2017–18	Premier League	7	0	1	0	3	0	6 (Note: Appearances in UEFA Champions League)	1	0	0	17	1
Manchester United	Total		90	4	13	1	8	0	29	1	1	0	141	6
Ajax	2018–19	Eredivisie	34	5	5	1	—		18	0	—		57	6
Ajax	2019–20	Eredivisie	20	0	2	0	—		11 (Note: Nine appearances in UEFA Champions League, two appearances in UEFA Europa League)	0	1	1	34	1
Ajax	2020–21	Eredivisie	23	1	3	0	—		8 (Note: Five appearances in UEFA Champions League, three appearances in UEFA Europa League)	0	—		34	1
Ajax	2021–22	Eredivisie	34	1	3	0	—		8	1	1	0	46	2
Ajax	2022–23	Eredivisie	13	0	0	0	—		5	0	1	0	19	0
Ajax	Total		124	7	13	1	—		50	1	3	1	190	10
Bayern Munich	2022–23	Bundesliga	4	0	1	0	—		0	0	—		5	0
Girona	2023–24	La Liga	34	1	3	2	—		—		—		37	3
Girona	2024–25	La Liga	34	0	2	0	—		4	0	—		40	0
Girona	2025–26	La Liga	31	0	0	0	—		—		—		31	0
Girona	Total		99	1	5	2	—		4	0	—		108	3
Ajax	2026–27	Eredivisie	1	0	0	0	—		4 (Note: AppearanceS in UEFA Conference League)	0	—		5	0
Ajax	Ajax total		227	10	27	1	—		78	1	6	0	338	12
Career total			438	15	47	4	8	0	111	2	9	1	613	22

=== International ===
Appearances and goals by national team and year
National team	Year	Apps	Goals
Netherlands	2013	8	0
Netherlands	2014	17	2
Netherlands	2015	9	0
Netherlands	2016	8	0
Netherlands	2017	10	0
Netherlands	2018	8	0
Netherlands	2019	9	0
Netherlands	2020	5	0
Netherlands	2021	14	0
Netherlands	2022	11	1
Netherlands	2023	5	0
Netherlands	2024	4	0
Total		108	3

Scores and results list Netherlands goal tally first, score column indicates score after each Blind goal.

List of international goals scored by Daley Blind
No.	Cap	Date	Venue	Opponent	Score	Result	Competition	Ref.
1	19	12 July 2014	Estádio Nacional Mané Garrincha, Brasília, Brazil	Brazil	2–0	3–0	2014 FIFA World Cup	
2	24	12 November 2014	Amsterdam Arena, Amsterdam, Netherlands	Mexico	2–3	2–3	Friendly	
3	98	3 December 2022	Khalifa International Stadium, Al Rayyan, Qatar	United States	2–0	3–1	2022 FIFA World Cup	

== Honours ==
Ajax

- Eredivisie: 2010–11, 2011–12, 2012–13, 2013–14, 2018–19, 2020–21, 2021–22
- KNVB Cup: 2018–19, 2020–21
- Johan Cruyff Shield: 2013, 2019

Manchester United

- FA Cup: 2015–16
- EFL Cup: 2016–17
- FA Community Shield: 2016
- UEFA Europa League: 2016–17

Bayern Munich

- Bundesliga: 2022–23

Netherlands

- FIFA World Cup third place: 2014
- UEFA Nations League runner-up: 2018–19

Individual

- Ajax Talent of the Future (Sjaak Swart Award): 2007–08
- Ajax Player of the Year (Rinus Michels Award): 2012–13
- AFC Ajax Club of 100: 2013
- Dutch Footballer of the Year: 2014
- Eredivisie Team of the Year : 2012–13, 2013–14, 2018–19
- Amsterdam's Player of the Year (De Fanny): 2014
- UEFA Europa League Squad of the Season: 2016–17
- UEFA Nations League Finals Team of the Tournament: 2019

== See also ==
- List of men's footballers with 100 or more international caps
