= 2026–27 Segunda División =

95th season of the second-tier football league in Spain

La Liga 2
- Season: 2026–27
- Dates: 14 August 2026 – June 2027
- Matches: 156
- Goals: 421 (2.7 per match)
- Top goalscorer: Miguel de la Fuente (9 goals)
- Biggest home win: Castellón 5–0 Tenerife (19 September 2026); Valladolid 5–0 Albacete (12 October 2026)
- Biggest away win: Celta Fortuna 0–4 Eibar (14 September 2026)
- Highest scoring: Girona 5–2 Las Palmas (29 August 2026); Valladolid 4–3 Leganés (2 November 2026)
- Longest winning run: Almería; Eibar (7 matches)
- Longest unbeaten run: Almería (11 matches)
- Longest winless run: Albacete (10 matches)
- Longest losing run: Ceuta; Real Sociedad B (6 losses)

The 2026–27 La Liga 2, also known as La Liga Hypermotion due to sponsorship reasons, is the 96th season of the Segunda División since its establishment in Spain. It commenced on 14 August 2026 and is scheduled to end in June 2027.

== Summary ==
On 3 November 2026, Tenerife player Jesús de Miguel died while on Tenerife's match against FC Andorra previous day, following a collision with Andorra goalkeeper Jesús Owono.

== Teams ==
=== Team changes ===
Promoted from 2025–26 Primera Federación	Relegated from 2025–26 La Liga	Promoted to 2026–27 La Liga	Relegated to 2026–27 Primera Federación
Tenerife; Eldense; Sabadell; Celta Fortuna	Mallorca; Girona; Oviedo	Racing Santander; Deportivo A Coruña; Málaga	Mirandés; Huesca; Cultural Leonesa; Zaragoza

=== Promotion and relegation (pre-season) ===
A total of 22 teams will contest the league, comprising 15 sides from the 2025–26 season, three relegated from the 2025–26 La Liga, and four promoted from the 2025–26 Primera Federación.

Teams promoted to La Liga

On 16 May 2026, Racing Santander became the first side to mathematically be promoted, following a 3–2 win against Real Valladolid; they secured a return to the top flight after a 14-year absence. Deportivo La Coruña became the second team to be promoted, on the penultimate matchday after defeating Real Valladolid 2–0. The third and final team was Málaga, who secures the promotion spot by defeating Almería 2–1 on aggregate in the promotion play-offs. Both Deportivo and Málaga returned to La Liga after 8 years absence.

Teams relegated from La Liga

On 11 May 2026, Oviedo became the first team to be relegated to the second division, following a 1–1 draw between Rayo Vallecano and Girona. They returned after spending only one season in the Spanish top flight. The second and third teams to be relegated were Girona and Mallorca, both on 23 May 2026, ending their stints of four and five years in the top flight respectively.

Teams relegated to Primera Federación

The first, second, and third teams to be relegated were Zaragoza, Cultural Leonesa, and Huesca, after they failed to win their respective matches on 24 May 2026. This ended Zaragoza's 77-year streak in professional football, having spent 55 of those seasons in La Liga. Cultural Leonesa returned to the third tier after only one season, and Huesca was relegated after spending 11 years in professional football. On 31 May 2026, Mirandés became the fourth and last team to be relegated to the third tier, after a seven-year stint in the second division.

Teams promoted from Primera Federación

On 1 May 2026, Tenerife became the first team to achieve promotion to the second division, following a 2–0 win against Barakaldo. They return after a one-year absence. The second team to earn promotion was Eldense following a 2–1 win against Atlético Madrileño on 16 May 2026, also returning at their first attempt. On 19 June 2026, The third team to secure promotion was Sabadell who returned after a five-year absence after beating Zamora 4–1 on aggregate in the final promotion play-off. The last team to earn promotion was Celta Fortuna, the B team of Celta Vigo, entering the second tier for the first time in their club history after a victory against Ponferradina by 4–1 on aggregate to secure promotion.

=== Stadiums and locations ===
Location of teams in 2026–27 Segunda División

Team	Location	Stadium	Capacity
Albacete	Albacete	Estadio Carlos Belmonte	17,524
Almería	Almería	UD Almería Stadium	15,000
Andorra (Note: Andorra is an Andorran club playing in the Spanish football league system.)	Encamp	Nou Estadi Encamp	5,108
Burgos	Burgos	Estadio El Plantío	12,194
Cádiz	Cádiz	JP Financial Estadio	20,724
Castellón	Castellón de la Plana	Estadio SkyFi Castàlia	15,500
Celta Fortuna	Vigo	Estadio ABANCA Balaídos	24,870
Ceuta	Ceuta	Estadio Alfonso Murube	6,500
Córdoba	Córdoba	Estadio Bahrain Victorious Nuevo Arcángel de Córdoba	20,989
Eibar	Eibar	Estadio Municipal de Ipurua	8,164
Eldense	Elda	Estadio Pepico Amat	5,776
Girona	Girona	Estadio Municipal de Montilivi	14,624
Granada	Granada	Estadio Nuevo Los Cármenes	19,189
Las Palmas	Las Palmas	Estadio Gran Canaria	32,392
Leganés	Leganés	Estadio Ontime Butarque	14,422
Mallorca	Palma	Estadi Mallorca Son Moix	23,142
Oviedo	Oviedo	Estadio Carlos Tartiere	30,500
Real Sociedad B	San Sebastián	Estadio Zubieta	4,000
Sabadell	Sabadell	Nova Creu Alta	11,908
Sporting Gijón	Gijón	Estadio El Molinón-Enrique Castro "Quini"	29,371
Tenerife	Santa Cruz de Tenerife	Estadio Heliodoro Rodríguez López	22,824
Valladolid	Valladolid	Estadio Municipal José Zorrilla	27,618

=== Personnel and sponsors ===
Team	Manager	Captain	Kit maker	Kit sponsors	
Team	Manager	Captain	Kit maker	Main	Other(s)
Albacete	(Spain) Joseba Etxeberria	(Spain) Higinio Marín	Adidas	Globalcaja	List: Side: Digi; Back: Rodacal Beyem, Iner Energía; Sleeves: MGS Seguros; Shorts: Aqua Deus
Almería	(Spain) García Pimienta	(Spain) Fernando Martínez	Macron	SMC Group	List: Side: None; Back: None; Sleeves: Kudu; Shorts: None
Andorra	(Spain) Carles Manso	(Argentina) Nico Ratti	Nike	Mora Banc	List: Side: None; Back: Andorra; Sleeves: None; Shorts: Andorra
Burgos	(Spain) Sergio Francisco	(Spain) Curro Sánchez	Macron	Digi	List: Side: None; Back: Fundación Caja Rural Burgos; Sleeves: Beroil; Shorts: Ayuntamiento de Burgos, VTBatteries Exide
Cádiz	(Spain) Borja Jiménez	(Spain) David Gil	Kappa	Digi	List: Side: None; Back: Hospitales Pascual; Sleeves: Ayuda T Pymes; Shorts: None
Castellón	(Spain) Pablo Hernández	(Spain) Alberto Jiménez	Errea	DoYouSpain	List: Side: Repcar Still; Back: Globeenergy; Sleeves: MGS Seguros; Shorts: CCD
Celta Fortuna	(Spain) Fredi Álvarez	(Spain) Pablo Meixús	Hummel	Estrella Galicia	List: Side: None; Back: Recalvi; Sleeves: JP Financial; Shorts: Siweb
Ceuta	(Spain) Sergio Lobera	(Spain) Albert Caparrós	Macron	Ceuta	List: Side: Punta Almina Promociones y Costrucciones; Back: None; Sleeves: Baleària; Shorts: Hélity Copter Airlines
Córdoba	(Spain) Iván Ania	(Spain) Carlos Albarrán	Joma	Bahrain Victorious	List: Side: Córdoba; Back: Globalzia, Silbon; Sleeves: Province of Córdoba; Shorts: iFertility
Eibar	(Spain) Jokin Aranbarri	(Spain) Anaitz Arbilla	Hummel	Smartlog Group	List: Side: None; Back: Software logístico Galys; Sleeves: None; Shorts: None
Eldense	(Spain) Javier Calleja	(Spain) Jesús Clemente	Hummel	MiM Hotels	List: Side: Castillo del Elda; Back: TBA; Sleeves: Next Energía; Shorts: Caja Rural Central
Girona	(Spain) Quique Álvarez	(Uruguay) Cristhian Stuani	Puma	Etihad Airways	List: Side: None; Back: Marlex; Sleeves: HYLO; Shorts: None
Granada	(Spain) Pacheta	(Spain) Rubén Alcaraz	Adidas	Cámara Granada	List: Side: None; Back: Lowi; Sleeves: Caja Rural Granada; Shorts: Grupo Eigra
Las Palmas	(Spain) Albert Sánchez	(Spain) Kirian Rodríguez	Hummel	Gran Canaria	List: Side: Cerveza PÍO PÍO; Back: Grupo DISA, Digi; Sleeves: Kalise; Shorts: Cordial Hotels, Binter
Leganés	(Spain) Luis Carrión	(Spain) Rubén Peña	Puma	OnTime	List: Side: SportyTV Africa; Back: Nara Seguros; Sleeves: None; Shorts: Ebury
Mallorca	(Spain) Luis García	(Spain) Antonio Raíllo	Nike	αGEL by Taica	List: Side: None; Back: Juaneda Hospitales, Alua Hotels & Resorts; Sleeves: Digi; Shorts: Air Europa
Oviedo	(Spain) Raúl González	(Spain) David Costas	Adidas	Digi	List: Side: Oviedo, origen del Camino; Back: Central Lechera Asturiana, Hyundai Asturdai; Sleeves: Integra Energía; Shorts: Guanajuato Vive Grandes Historias, DEXTools
Real Sociedad B	(Spain) Ion Ansotegi	(Spain) Luken Beitia	Joma	Grupo Amenabar	List: Side: None; Back: Kutxabank; Sleeves: None; Shorts: Kutxabank
Sabadell	(Spain) Ferran Costa	(Brazil) Arthur Bonaldo	Kappa	None	List: Side: None; Back: None; Sleeves: Visit Sabadell; Shorts: None
Sporting Gijón	(Argentina) Nicolás Larcamón	(Spain) Rubén Yáñez	Siroko	Siroko	List: Side: None; Back: Central Lechera Asturiana; Sleeves: Marea Rojiblanca; Shorts: Esfer, Nissan
Tenerife	(Spain) Álvaro Cervera	(Spain) Enric Gallego	Macron	Tenerife	List: Side: Santa Cruz; Back: Islas Canarias; Sleeves: Egatesa; Shorts: Volkswagen, EAVE
Valladolid	(Spain) Fran Escribá	(Croatia) Stanko Jurić	Reebok	Estrella Galicia 0,0	List: Side: Caja Rural Zamora; Back: Digi; Sleeves: None; Shorts: INEXO, Grupo Ahorra

=== Managerial changes ===
Team	Outgoing manager	Manner of departure	Date of vacancy	Position in the table	Incoming manager	Date of appointment
Oviedo	(Uruguay) Guillermo Almada	End of contract	24 May 2026	Pre-season	(Spain) Julián Calero	11 June 2026
Girona	(Spain) Míchel	Mutual consent	28 May 2026	Pre-season	(Spain) Quique Álvarez	22 June 2026
Sporting Gijón	(Spain) Borja Jiménez	Mutual consent	31 May 2026	Pre-season	(Argentina) Nicolás Larcamón	1 July 2026
Leganés	(Spain) Carlos Martínez	End of contract	31 May 2026	Pre-season	(Spain) Rubén Albés	15 June 2026
Burgos	(Spain) Luis Miguel Ramis	End of contract	2 June 2026	Pre-season	(Spain) Sergio Francisco	16 June 2026
Eibar	(Spain) Beñat San José	Signed by Rayo Vallecano	18 June 2026	Pre-season	(Spain) Jokin Aranbarri	20 June 2026
Las Palmas	(Spain) Luis García	End of contract	22 June 2026	Pre-season	(Spain) Rubén de la Barrera	22 June 2026
Mallorca	(Argentina) Martín Demichelis	Signed by RB Leipzig	22 June 2026	Pre-season	(Spain) Luis García	22 June 2026
Almería	(Spain) Rubi	Sacked	30 June 2026	Pre-season	(Spain) García Pimienta	30 June 2026
Cádiz	(Spain) Imanol Idiakez	Mutual consent	11 August 2026	Pre-season	(Spain) Albert Celades	11 August 2026
Eldense	(Spain) Claudio Barragán	Sacked	6 September 2026	16th	(Spain) Josep Ferrando (caretaker)	6 September 2026
Eldense	(Spain) Josep Ferrando (caretaker)	End of caretaker spell	16 September 2026	20th	(Spain) Javier Calleja	16 September 2026
Albacete	(Spain) Alberto González	Sacked	3 October 2026	22nd	(Spain) Joseba Etxeberria	4 October 2026
Las Palmas	(Spain) Rubén de la Barrera	Sacked	12 October 2026	15th	(Spain) Juan Manuel Rodríguez (caretaker)	12 October 2026
Leganés	(Spain) Rubén Albés	Sacked	18 October 2026	17th	(Spain) Luis Carrión	18 October 2026
Cádiz	(Spain) Albert Celades	Sacked	19 October 2026	20th	(Spain) Borja Jiménez	22 October 2026
Las Palmas	(Spain) Juan Manuel Rodríguez	End of caretaker spell	29 October 2026	14th	(Spain) Albert Sánchez	29 October 2026
Ceuta	(Spain) José Juan Romero	Sacked	7 November 2026	22nd	(Spain) Sergio Lobera	8 November 2026
Oviedo	(Spain) Julián Calero	Sacked	9 November 2026	9th	(Spain) Raúl González	9 November 2026

== League table ==
Pos	Team	Pld	W	D	L	GF	GA	GD	Pts	Qualification or relegation
1	Castellón	14	10	3	1	26	5	+21	33	Promotion to La Liga
2	Almería	14	10	2	2	26	11	+15	32	Promotion to La Liga
3	Girona	15	8	3	4	26	14	+12	27	Qualification for promotion play-offs
4	Granada	14	8	3	3	22	15	+7	27	Qualification for promotion play-offs
5	Burgos	15	8	3	4	21	17	+4	27	Qualification for promotion play-offs
6	Mallorca	14	6	6	2	18	10	+8	24	Qualification for promotion play-offs
7	Eibar	14	7	3	4	23	17	+6	24	
8	Córdoba	15	7	2	6	28	25	+3	23	
9	Las Palmas	15	7	2	6	21	22	−1	23	
10	Sporting Gijón	15	7	2	6	16	19	−3	23	
11	Oviedo	15	6	3	6	20	21	−1	21	
12	Valladolid	15	5	4	6	23	22	+1	19	
13	Tenerife	14	4	7	3	17	17	0	19	
14	Sabadell	15	4	7	4	13	14	−1	19	
15	Leganés	15	5	3	7	17	25	−8	18	
16	Eldense	15	5	2	8	15	21	−6	17	
17	Cádiz	15	3	5	7	20	19	+1	14	
18	Celta Fortuna	15	3	5	7	20	27	−7	14	Not eligible for promotion
19	Real Sociedad B	15	3	4	8	17	27	−10	13	Relegation to Primera Federación
20	Albacete	15	4	1	10	14	25	−11	13	Relegation to Primera Federación
21	Andorra	14	3	2	9	19	26	−7	11	Relegation to Primera Federación
22	Ceuta	14	1	2	11	10	32	−22	5	Relegation to Primera Federación

Updated to match(es) played on 22 November 2026. Source: LaLiga Hypermotion
Rules for classification: 1) Points; 2) Head-to-head points; 3) Head-to-head goal difference; 4) Goal difference; 5) Goals scored; 6) Fair-play points
(Note: Head-to-head record is used only after all the matches between the teams in question have been played)

Notes

1. Reserve teams are not eligible for promotion to the same league as the first team.

== Results ==
Home \ Away	ALB	ALM	AND	BUR	CAD	CAS	CEL	CEU	COR	EIB	ELD	GIR	GRA	LPA	LEG	MLL	OVI	RSO	SAB	SPO	TEN	VAL
Albacete	—						1–0		1–2	1–3	2–0						0–1	1–2	2–1			
Almería		—	2–1	2–1	3–2		2–0				3–0				3–0		2–2					
Andorra			—	2–3		1–0		5–1		0–1					1–3			1–3		1–3		
Burgos	1–0			—		1–1	2–1	3–1	3–2		1–0		0–1					2–2	1–0			
Cádiz					—		0–0	3–1				1–2		0–1	4–0		1–2			0–1		1–1
Castellón	2–0					—		1–1			2–0								0–0	4–0	5–0	
Celta Fortuna			4–2			1–2	—		2–2	0–4								4–1	1–1		1–1	1–1
Ceuta							0–2	—						0–2			1–2	3–1	1–2	0–2		1–1
Córdoba		0–2						3–0	—	2–0		2–1	1–3				3–0				3–2	
Eibar		1–1			1–1					—			3–0	3–2		1–1					1–3	1–0
Eldense					2–2				2–1	1–2	—					0–0	4–1		2–0			
Girona	2–0	0–1	2–0			1–2	5–1			2–1		—		5–2	1–1	0–0					1–1	
Granada	1–1		2–3		2–0								—	1–0		2–0						2–1
Las Palmas	2–1			1–2		0–3					2–0			—	0–0			1–0			a	2–2
Leganés	1–3			3–1		0–2			0–1		1–0		3–2		—	1–1						
Mallorca		0–1			2–1			3–0	3–3					3–1		—			2–0			2–0
Oviedo				0–0						3–1		1–2	0–0	2–3	0–1		—			2–0		
Real Sociedad B		2–4			0–3	0–1						1–0	2–3			0–1		—		2–2	1–1	
Sabadell		1–0	0–0						3–2				1–1				3–1	0–0	—		1–1	
Sporting Gijón	2–1			1–0			3–2				0–1	0–2		0–2			a		0–0	—		
Tenerife		1–0	2–2		1–1			2–0						a	2–0	0–0				0–1	—	
Valladolid	5–0		1–0			0–1			3–1		2–3				4–3		0–3			1–2		—

Updated to match(es) played on 22 November 2026. Source: LaLiga Hypermotion
Legend: Blue = home team win; Yellow = draw; Red = away team win.

=== Positions by round ===
The table lists the positions of teams after each week of matches. In order to preserve chronological evolvements, any postponed matches are not included to the round at which they were originally scheduled, but added to the full round they were played immediately afterwards.

Team ╲ Round	1	2	3	4	5	6	7	8	9	10	11	12	13	14	15	16	17	18	19	20	21	22	23	24	25	26	27	28	29	30	31	32	33	34	35	36	37	38	39	40	41	42
Almería	2	9	16	12	6	4	3	3	1	1	2	2	1	1																												
Castellón	7	6	2	1	1	1	1	2	3	2	1	1	2	2																												
Granada	12	4	1	9	10	14	13	9	10	7	5	4	5	3																												
Girona	8	17	10	5	13	8	5	4	7	5	4	7	8	4																												
Eibar	19	14	8	2	2	2	2	1	2	3	3	3	4	5																												
Burgos	5	11	12	13	8	5	4	6	8	8	6	8	3	6																												
Mallorca	4	12	5	7	3	3	6	5	4	6	7	5	6	7																												
Sporting	15	7	4	11	15	9	12	8	6	4	8	6	7	8																												
Oviedo	13	18	14	15	7	13	8	10	9	9	9	9	9	9																												
Córdoba	16	10	18	19	20	16	18	15	18	15	11	12	11	10																												
Las Palmas	6	1	7	10	5	10	11	11	15	16	14	11	10	11																												
Valladolid	20	21	19	16	17	18	16	14	11	13	15	13	12	12																												
Sabadell	14	16	9	3	11	6	7	7	5	10	10	10	13	13																												
Tenerife	3	2	6	8	4	11	9	12	12	12	13	14	14	14																												
Eldense	21	19	20	20	16	17	19	17	14	11	12	15	15	15																												
Leganés	9	5	3	4	12	7	10	13	16	17	17	17	18	16																												
Celta B	11	3	11	6	14	15	15	18	13	14	16	16	16	17																												
R. Sociedad B	18	13	13	14	9	12	14	16	19	19	20	19	17	18																												
Albacete	17	20	21	21	21	21	22	22	22	22	22	21	21	19																												
Cádiz	10	15	17	18	19	19	20	19	20	20	18	20	20	20																												
Andorra	1	8	15	17	18	20	17	20	17	18	19	18	19	21																												
Ceuta	22	22	22	22	22	22	21	21	21	21	21	22	22	22	22																											

Promotion to La Liga
Qualification to promotion play-offs
Relegation to Primera Federación

Source: BDFútbol

== Season statistics ==
=== Scoring ===
- First goal of the season:
  (Guinea) Ousmane Camara for Castellón against Real Sociedad B (14 August 2026)

=== Top goalscorers ===
As of 21 November 2026

Rank	Player	Club	Goals
1	(Spain) Miguel de la Fuente	Almería	9
2	(Spain) Enric Gallego	Tenerife	8
2	(Spain) Álvaro Marín	Celta Fortuna	8
4	(Spain) Adrián Fuentes	Mallorca	7
5	(Spain) Antoñito	Cádiz	6
5	(Spain) Diego Percan	Córdoba	6
5	(Spain) Israel Suero	Castellón	6
8	(Spain) Adrián Arnuncio	Valladolid	5
8	(Colombia) Yáser Asprilla	Girona	5
8	(Spain) Jordi Cano	Andorra	5
8	(Spain) Carlos Domínguez	Oviedo	5
8	(Spain) Jorge Pascual	Granada	5
8	(Ukraine) Vladyslav Vanat	Girona	5

=== Hat-tricks ===
Player	For	Against	Result	Date	Round	Ref.
(Ukraine) Vladyslav Vanat	Girona	Celta Fortuna	5–1 (H)	24 October 2026	11	

Note

(H) – Home; (A) – Away

=== Zamora Trophy ===
As of 21 November 2026

The Zamora Trophy is awarded by newspaper Marca to the goalkeeper with the lowest goals-to-games ratio. A goalkeeper has to have played at least 28 games of 60 or more minutes to be eligible for the trophy.

Rank	Player	Club	Goals against	Matches	Average
1	(Belgium) Romain Matthys	Castellón	5	14	0.36
2	(Spain) Arnau Tenas	Mallorca	10	14	0.71
3	(Spain) Andrés Fernández	Almería	11	14	0.79
4	(Spain) Diego Fuoli	Sabadell	14	15	0.93
5	(Argentina) Paulo Gazzaniga	Girona	13	13	1.00

== Awards ==
=== Monthly ===
Month	Player of the Month		Reference
Month	Player	Club	Reference
August	(Japan) Taisei Miyashiro	Las Palmas	
September	(Spain) Jon Guruzeta	Eibar	
October	(Spain) Israel Suero	Castellón	

== See also ==
- 2026–27 La Liga
- 2026–27 Primera Federación
- 2026–27 Segunda Federación
- 2026–27 Tercera Federación
