= 2003–04 UD Las Palmas season =

Las Palmas
2003–04 season
- Head coach: Juan Manuel Rodríguez (until 14 December); David Vidal
- Stadium: Estadio Gran Canaria
- Segunda División: 20th (relegated)
- Copa del Rey: Round of 64
- Top goalscorer: League: Rubén Castro (22); All: Rubén Castro (22)
- Average home league attendance: 14,300 (League only)

The 2003–04 season was the 55th season in the history of UD Las Palmas and the club's second consecutive season in the second division of Spanish football. In addition to the domestic league, Las Palmas participated in this season's edition of the Copa del Rey.

== Competitions ==
=== Overall record ===
Competition	First match	Last match	Starting round	Final position	Record							
Competition	First match	Last match	Starting round	Final position	Pld	W	D	L	GF	GA	GD	Win %
Segunda División	6 September 2003	19 June 2004	Matchday 1	20th	42	10	14	18	46	68	−22	23.81
Copa del Rey	8 October 2003		Round of 64	Round of 64	1	0	0	1	1	2	−1	0.00
Total					43	10	14	19	47	70	−23	23.26

Source: Competitions

=== Segunda División ===
==== League table ====
Pos	Team	Pld	W	D	L	GF	GA	GD	Pts	Promotion or relegation
18	Poli Ejido	42	12	13	17	29	40	−11	49 (Note: MálB: 11 pts; CÓR: 9 pts; CMU: 8 pts; EJI: 3 pts)	
19	Leganés (R)	42	9	19	14	36	47	−11	46	Relegation to Segunda División B
20	Las Palmas (R)	42	10	14	18	46	68	−22	44	Relegation to Segunda División B
21	Rayo Vallecano (R)	42	11	10	21	45	63	−18	43	Relegation to Segunda División B
22	Algeciras (R)	42	6	15	21	39	57	−18	33	Relegation to Segunda División B

Source: LFP - Liga Adelante
Rules for classification: 1st points; 2nd head-to-head points; 3rd head-to-head goal difference; 4th head-to-head goals scored; 5th goal difference; 6th number of goals scored; 7th Fair-play points
(R) Relegated

==== Results summary ====
Overall								Home						Away					
Pld	W	D	L	GF	GA	GD	Pts	W	D	L	GF	GA	GD	W	D	L	GF	GA	GD
42	10	14	18	46	68	−22	44	5	9	7	25	30	−5	5	5	11	21	38	−17

Source: BDFutbol

==== Results by round ====
Round	1	2	3	4	5	6	7	8	9	10	11	12	13	14	15	16	17	18	19	20	21	22	23	24	25	26	27	28	29	30	31	32	33	34	35	36	37	38	39	40	41	42
Ground	A	H	A	H	A	H	A	H	A	H	A	H	A	H	A	H	H	A	H	A	H	H	A	H	A	H	A	H	A	H	A	H	A	H	A	H	A	A	H	A	H	A
Result	W	D	L	L	D	D	D	D	W	D	L	D	D	W	L	L	L	D	D	D	W	L	W	W	L	W	L	L	L	D	L	L	L	L	W	D	L	L	D	L	W	W
Position																																										

Source: BDFutbol
A = Away; H = Home; W = Win; D = Draw; L = Loss

==== Matches ====
6 September 2003 2	Las Palmas	2–2	Leganés	Las Palmas
				Stadium: Estadio Gran Canaria

14 September 2003 3	Numancia	2–0	Las Palmas	Soria
				Stadium: Nuevo Estadio Los Pajaritos

17 September 2003 1	Elche	1–2	Las Palmas	Elche
				Stadium: Martínez Valero

21 September 2003 4	Las Palmas	2–3	Ciudad de Murcia	Las Palmas
				Stadium: Estadio Gran Canaria

27 September 2003 5	Eibar	1–1	Las Palmas	Eibar
				Stadium: Ipurua Municipal Stadium

4 October 2003 6	Las Palmas	1–1	Tenerife	Las Palmas
				Stadium: Estadio Gran Canaria

12 October 2003 7	Sporting Gijón	1–1	Las Palmas	Gijón
				Stadium: El Molinón

18 October 2003 8	Las Palmas	1–1	Almería	Las Palmas
				Stadium: Estadio Gran Canaria

26 October 2003 9	Málaga B	0–1	Las Palmas	Málaga
				Stadium: La Rosaleda Stadium

1 November 2003 10	Las Palmas	1–1	Getafe	Las Palmas
				Stadium: Estadio Gran Canaria

8 November 2003 11	Alavés	1–0	Las Palmas	Vitoria-Gasteiz
				Stadium: Mendizorrotza

15 November 2003 12	Las Palmas	2–2	Algeciras	Las Palmas
				Stadium: Estadio Gran Canaria

23 November 2003 13	Recreativo	2–2	Las Palmas	Huelva
				Stadium: Estadio Nuevo Colombino

29 November 2003 14	Las Palmas	3–1	Córdoba	Las Palmas
				Stadium: Estadio Gran Canaria

6 December 2003 15	Salamanca	2–0	Las Palmas	Villares de la Reina
				Stadium: Helmántico Stadium

13 December 2003 16	Las Palmas	0–2	Cádiz	Las Palmas
				Stadium: Estadio Gran Canaria

20 December 2003 17	Las Palmas	1–2	Levante	Las Palmas
				Stadium: Estadio Gran Canaria

4 January 2004 18	Xerez	4–4	Las Palmas	Jerez de la Frontera
				Stadium: Estadio Municipal de Chapín

10 January 2004 19	Las Palmas	0–0	Poli Ejido	Las Palmas
				Stadium: Estadio Gran Canaria

17 January 2004 20	Terrassa	2–2	Las Palmas	Terrassa
				Stadium: Estadi Olímpic de Terrassa

24 January 2004 21	Las Palmas	1–0	Rayo Vallecano	Las Palmas
				Stadium: Estadio Gran Canaria

31 January 2004 22	Las Palmas	1–2	Elche	Las Palmas
				Stadium: Estadio Gran Canaria

7 February 2004 23	Leganés	0–2	Las Palmas	Leganés
				Stadium: Estadio Municipal de Butarque

14 February 2004 24	Las Palmas	2–1	Numancia	Las Palmas
				Stadium: Estadio Gran Canaria

21 February 2004 25	Ciudad de Murcia	3–1	Las Palmas	Murcia
				Stadium: Estadio de La Condomina

28 February 2004 26	Las Palmas	1–0	Eibar	Las Palmas
				Stadium: Estadio Gran Canaria

7 March 2004 27	Tenerife	2–0	Las Palmas	Santa Cruz de Tenerife
				Stadium: Heliodoro Rodríguez López

14 March 2004 28	Las Palmas	1–2	Sporting Gijón	Las Palmas
				Stadium: Estadio Gran Canaria

20 March 2004 29	Almería	3–0	Las Palmas	Almería
				Stadium: Estadio Municipal Juan Rojas

27 March 2004 30	Las Palmas	1–1	Málaga B	Las Palmas
				Stadium: Estadio Gran Canaria

3 April 2004 31	Getafe	3–0	Las Palmas	Getafe
				Stadium: Coliseum Alfonso Pérez

11 April 2004 32	Las Palmas	1–2	Alavés	Las Palmas
				Stadium: Estadio Gran Canaria

18 April 2004 33	Algeciras	2–0	Las Palmas	Algeciras
				Stadium: Estadio Nuevo Mirador

24 April 2004 34	Las Palmas	0–4	Recreativo	Las Palmas
				Stadium: Estadio Gran Canaria

1 May 2004 35	Córdoba	1–2	Las Palmas	Córdoba
				Stadium: Estadio Nuevo Arcángel

8 May 2004 36	Las Palmas	1–1	Salamanca	Las Palmas
				Stadium: Estadio Gran Canaria

15 May 2004 37	Cádiz	4–1	Las Palmas	Cádiz
				Stadium: Ramón de Carranza

23 May 2004 38	Levante	2–0	Las Palmas	Valencia
				Stadium: Estadi Ciutat de València

30 May 2004 39	Las Palmas	1–1	Xerez	Las Palmas
				Stadium: Estadio Gran Canaria

5 June 2004 40	Poli Ejido	1–0	Las Palmas	El Ejido
				Stadium: Santo Domingo

13 June 2004 41	Las Palmas	2–1	Terrassa	Las Palmas
				Stadium: Estadio Gran Canaria

19 June 2004 42	Rayo Vallecano	1–2	Las Palmas	Madrid
				Stadium: Estadio Teresa Rivero

=== Copa del Rey ===
8 October 2003 Round of 64	Las Palmas	1–2 (a.e.t.)	Córdoba	Las Palmas
				Stadium: Estadio Gran Canaria
