= 2002–03 UD Las Palmas season =

Las Palmas
2002–03 season
- Head coach: Josu Uribe
- Stadium: Estadio Insular
- Segunda División: 5th
- Copa del Rey: Round of 64
- Top goalscorer: League: Gustavo Reggi (11); All: Gustavo Reggi (11)
- Average home league attendance: 10,629 (League only)

The 2002–03 season was the 54th season in the history of UD Las Palmas and the club's first season back in the second division of Spanish football. In addition to the domestic league, Las Palmas participated in this season's edition of the Copa del Rey.

== Transfers ==
=== In ===
No.	Pos.	Player	Transferred from	Fee	Date	Source
	FW	(Argentina) Gustavo Reggi	(Argentina) Unión de Santa Fe	Free		
	MF	(Portugal) Diogo Matos	(Portugal) Sporting CP	Loan		
	GK	(Denmark) Bo Braastrup Andersen	(Norway) Viking FK			
	MF	(Spain) Tomás Hervás	(Spain) Sevilla			

=== Out ===
No.	Pos.	Player	Transferred to	Fee	Date	Source
	DF	(Spain) Gabriel Schürrer	(Spain) Real Sociedad	Free		
	DF	(Spain) Edu Alonso	(Spain) Alavés	Free		
	MF	(Spain) Josico	(Spain) Villarreal	Free		
	DF	(Spain) Ángel López	(Spain) Celta Vigo	Free	January 2003	

== Competitions ==
=== Overall record ===
Competition	First match	Last match	Starting round	Final position	Record							
Competition	First match	Last match	Starting round	Final position	Pld	W	D	L	GF	GA	GD	Win %
Segunda División	31 August 2002	29 June 2003	Matchday 1	5th	42	16	16	10	53	43	+10	38.10
Copa del Rey	11 September 2002		Round of 64	Round of 64	1	0	0	1	1	2	−1	0.00
Total					43	16	16	11	54	45	+9	37.21

Source: Competitions

=== Segunda División ===
==== League table ====
Pos	Team	Pld	W	D	L	GF	GA	GD	Pts	Promotion or relegation
3	Albacete (P)	42	17	20	5	51	30	+21	71	Promotion to La Liga
4	Levante	42	16	17	9	59	44	+15	65	
5	Las Palmas	42	16	16	10	53	43	+10	64 (Note: XER 2–2 LPA; LPA 4–0 XER)	
6	Xerez	42	17	13	12	55	53	+2	64	
7	Salamanca	42	14	18	10	44	32	+12	60	

Source: LFP - Liga Adelante
Rules for classification: 1st points; 2nd head-to-head points; 3rd head-to-head goal difference; 4th head-to-head goals scored; 5th goal difference; 6th number of goals scored; 7th Fair-play points
(P) Promoted

==== Results summary ====
Overall								Home						Away					
Pld	W	D	L	GF	GA	GD	Pts	W	D	L	GF	GA	GD	W	D	L	GF	GA	GD
42	16	16	10	53	43	+10	64	10	6	5	32	21	+11	6	10	5	21	22	−1

Source: BDFutbol

==== Results by round ====
Round	1	2	3	4	5	6	7	8	9	10	11	12	13	14	15	16	17	18	19	20	21	22	23	24	25	26	27	28	29	30	31	32	33	34	35	36	37	38	39	40	41	42
Ground	H	A	H	A	H	A	H	A	H	A	H	A	H	A	H	A	H	A	H	H	A	A	H	A	H	A	H	A	H	A	H	A	H	A	H	A	H	A	H	A	A	H
Result	W	D	D	D	W	D	W	L	L	D	D	L	L	D	W	D	W	L	D	W	L	W	W	W	D	D	L	D	D	W	W	L	W	D	L	W	D	W	L	W	D	W
Position	1	3	5	8	4	6	2	7	9	8	9	10	15	16	12	12	9	11	12	7	10	9	5	5	6	6	7	8	8	7	6	6	6	6	6	6	6	5	6	5	5	5

Source: BDFutbol
A = Away; H = Home; W = Win; D = Draw; L = Loss

==== Matches ====
31 August 2002 1	Las Palmas	2–0	Racing Ferrol	Las Palmas
				Stadium: Estadio Insular

15 September 2002 2	Xerez	2–2	Las Palmas	Jerez de la Frontera

21 September 2002 3	Las Palmas	1–1	Compostela	Las Palmas
				Stadium: Estadio Insular

29 September 2002 4	Sporting Gijón	0–0	Las Palmas	Gijón

5 October 2002 5	Las Palmas	2–0	Oviedo	Las Palmas
				Stadium: Estadio Insular

12 October 2002 6	Leganés	1–1	Las Palmas	Leganés

19 October 2002 7	Las Palmas	2–1	Getafe	Las Palmas
				Stadium: Estadio Insular

27 October 2002 8	Albacete	2–1	Las Palmas	Albacete

2 November 2002 9	Las Palmas	0–1	Zaragoza	Las Palmas
				Stadium: Estadio Insular

10 November 2002 10	Poli Ejido	0–0	Las Palmas	El Ejido

17 November 2002 11	Las Palmas	2–2	Almería	Las Palmas
				Stadium: Estadio Insular

24 November 2002 12	Salamanca	2–1	Las Palmas	Salamanca

30 November 2002 13	Las Palmas	0–1	Eibar	Las Palmas
				Stadium: Estadio Insular

8 December 2002 14	Córdoba	2–2	Las Palmas	Córdoba

14 December 2002 15	Las Palmas	2–0	Terrassa	Las Palmas
				Stadium: Estadio Insular

22 December 2002 16	Levante	1–1	Las Palmas	Valencia

4 January 2003 17	Las Palmas	2–0	Badajoz	Las Palmas
				Stadium: Estadio Insular

11 January 2003 18	Murcia	6–1	Las Palmas	Murcia

18 January 2003 19	Las Palmas	0–0	Numancia	Las Palmas
				Stadium: Estadio Insular

25 January 2003 20	Las Palmas	1–0	Tenerife	Las Palmas
				Stadium: Estadio Insular

2 February 2003 21	Elche	3–2	Las Palmas	Elche

8 February 2003 22	Racing Ferrol	1–2	Las Palmas	Ferrol

15 February 2003 23	Las Palmas	4–0	Xerez	Las Palmas
				Stadium: Estadio Insular

23 February 2003 24	Compostela	0–3	Las Palmas	Santiago de Compostela

2 March 2003 25	Las Palmas	2–2	Sporting Gijón	Las Palmas
				Stadium: Estadio Insular

9 March 2003 26	Oviedo	0–0	Las Palmas	Oviedo

15 March 2003 27	Las Palmas	1–4	Leganés	Las Palmas
				Stadium: Estadio Insular

22 March 2003 28	Getafe	0–0	Las Palmas	Getafe

29 March 2003 29	Las Palmas	1–1	Albacete	Las Palmas
				Stadium: Estadio Insular

6 April 2003 30	Zaragoza	1–2	Las Palmas	Zaragoza

12 April 2003 31	Las Palmas	2–0	Poli Ejido	Las Palmas
				Stadium: Estadio Insular

19 April 2003 32	Almería	1–0	Las Palmas	Almería

26 April 2003 33	Las Palmas	2–1	Salamanca	Las Palmas
				Stadium: Estadio Insular

3 May 2003 34	Eibar	0–0	Las Palmas	Eibar

10 May 2003 35	Las Palmas	0–1	Córdoba	Las Palmas
				Stadium: Estadio Insular

18 May 2003 36	Terrassa	0–1	Las Palmas	Terrassa

24 May 2003 37	Las Palmas	1–1	Levante	Las Palmas
				Stadium: Estadio Insular

31 May 2003 38	Badajoz	0–1	Las Palmas	Badajoz

7 June 2003 39	Las Palmas	1–4	Murcia	Las Palmas
				Stadium: Estadio Insular

14 June 2003 40	Numancia	0–1	Las Palmas	Soria

21 June 2003 41	Tenerife	0–0	Las Palmas	Santa Cruz de Tenerife

29 June 2003 42	Las Palmas	4–1	Elche	Las Palmas
				Stadium: Estadio Insular

=== Copa del Rey ===
11 September 2002 Round of 64	Getafe	2–1 (a.e.t.)	Las Palmas	Getafe
				Stadium: Coliseum Alfonso Pérez

== Statistics ==
=== Appearances and goals ===
No.	Pos	Nat	Player	Total		La Liga		Copa del Rey	
No.	Pos	Nat	Player	Apps	Goals	Apps	Goals	Apps	Goals
Goalkeepers
25	GK	(Serbia and Montenegro) SCG	Željko Cicović	1	0	1	0	0	0
1	GK	(Spain) ESP	Orlando Quintana	15	0	15	0	0	0
13	GK	(Denmark) DEN	Bo Braastrup Andersen	23	0	23	0	0	0
31	GK	(Spain) ESP	Nauzet	4	0	3	0	1	0
Defenders
23	DF	(Sweden) SWE	Edier Frejd	5	0	5	0	0	0
12	DF	(Argentina) ARG	Diego Trotta	18	1	18	1	0	0
20	DF	(Andorra) AND	Ildefons Lima	23	2	22	2	1	0
3	DF	(Andorra) AND	Marc Bernaus	27	0	27	0	0	0
15	DF	(Spain) ESP	José Antonio	31	0	31	0	0	0
17	DF	(Spain) ESP	Javi Martel	37	0	36	0	1	0
4	DF	(Brazil) BRA	Álvaro	32	2	31	2	1	0
Midfielders
8	MF	(Brazil) BRA	Baiano	36	5	35	5	1	0
29	MF	(Spain) ESP	David González	2	0	2	0	0	0
28	MF	(Spain) ESP	Momo	4	0	4	0	0	0
26	MF	(Spain) ESP	José Silvano	1	0	1	0	0	0
6	MF	(Spain) ESP	Alberto	18	0	18	0	0	0
10	MF	(Spain) ESP	Tomás Hervás	13	1	13	1	0	0
2	MF	(Spain) ESP	Álex	15	0	14	0	1	0
18	MF	(Spain) ESP	Mario Cotelo	18	1	18	1	0	0
11	MF	(Spain) ESP	Pedro Vega	36	5	35	5	1	0
7	MF	(Spain) ESP	Carmelo González	32	3	31	3	1	0
22	MF	(Spain) ESP	Alberto Monteagudo	38	2	37	2	1	0
18	MF	(Cameroon) CMR	Alain N'Kong	11	1	11	1	0	0
14	MF	(Spain) ESP	Ángel Sánchez Armas	12	1	12	1	0	0
Forwards
	FW	(Peru) PER	Miguel Ángel Molina	2	0	2	0	0	0
16	FW	(Argentina) ARG	Rafael Maceratesi	9	1	9	1	0	0
21	FW	(Spain) ESP	Orlando Suárez	30	7	29	7	1	0
9	FW	(Spain) ESP	Rubén Castro	41	10	40	9	1	1
19	FW	(Argentina) ARG	Gustavo Reggi	38	11	37	11	1	0
Players transferred out during the season
5	DF	(Spain) ESP	Ángel López	18	1	17	1	1	0
10	MF	(Venezuela) VEN	Juan Carlos Socorro	4	0	3	0	1	0

Source: Competitions
