= 1999–2000 UD Las Palmas season =

UD Las Palmas
1999–2000 season
- President: Manuel García Navarro
- Head coach: Sergije Krešić
- Stadium: Estadio Gran Canaria
- Segunda División: 1st (promoted)
- Copa del Rey: Second round
- Top goalscorer: League: Eloy Jiménez (13); All: Eloy Jiménez (14)
- Biggest win: Las Palmas 7–1 Leganés
- Biggest defeat: Lleida 4–1 Las Palmas; Mérida 3–0 Las Palmas; Eibar 4–1 Las Palmas

The 1999–2000 season was the 51st season in the existence of UD Las Palmas and the club's fourth consecutive season in the second division of Spanish football. The season covered the period from 1 July 1999 to 30 June 2000.

== Transfers ==
=== In ===
No.	Pos	Player	Transferred from	Fee	Date	Source
	GK	(Spain) Francisco Rodríguez Amador	(Spain) Extremadura		1 July 1999	
	DF	(Spain) Jaime Molina	(Spain) Mérida		1 July 1999	

=== Out ===
No.	Pos	Player	Transferred to	Fee	Date	Source
	MF	(Croatia) Nenad Bjelica	(Croatia) Osijek		1 July 1999	
	GK	(Spain) Juan Canales	(Spain) Universidad de Las Palmas		1 July 1999	
	MF	(Argentina) Hernán Franco	(Argentina) Talleres		1 July 1999	
	MF	(Germany) Marco Haber	(Germany) SpVgg Unterhaching		1 July 1999	
	DF	(Spain) Sebastián Herrera	(Spain) Logroñés		1 July 1999	

== Pre-season and friendlies ==
Win Draw Loss

31 May 2000 Friendly	Las Palmas (Spain)	2–0	(Spain) Real Madrid	Las Palmas, Spain
WEST (UTC+01:00)	Olías; Renaldo			Stadium: Gran Canaria; Referee: Alexis Pérez

== Competitions ==
=== Overall record ===
Competition	First match	Last match	Starting round	Final position	Record							
Competition	First match	Last match	Starting round	Final position	Pld	W	D	L	GF	GA	GD	Win %
Segunda División	21 August 1999	4 June 2000	Matchday 1	Winners	42	20	12	10	60	41	+19	47.62
Copa del Rey	10 November 1999	11 January 2000	First round	Second round	4	1	2	1	4	4	+0	25.00
Total					46	21	14	11	64	45	+19	45.65

Source: BDFutbol

=== Segunda División ===
==== League table ====
Pos	Team	Pld	W	D	L	GF	GA	GD	Pts	Promotion or relegation
1	Las Palmas (C, P)	42	20	12	10	60	41	+19	72	Promotion to La Liga
2	Osasuna (P)	42	20	7	15	50	36	+14	67	Promotion to La Liga
3	Villarreal (P)	42	18	12	12	61	46	+15	66	Promotion to La Liga
4	Salamanca	42	18	12	12	54	43	+11	66	
5	Lleida	42	18	9	15	66	52	+14	63	

Rules for classification: 1st points; 2nd head-to-head points; 3rd head-to-head goal difference; 4th head-to-head goals scored; 5th goal difference; 6th number of goals scored; 7th Fair-play points
(C) Champions; (P) Promoted

==== Results summary ====
Overall								Home						Away					
Pld	W	D	L	GF	GA	GD	Pts	W	D	L	GF	GA	GD	W	D	L	GF	GA	GD
42	20	12	10	60	41	+19	72	11	6	4	32	17	+15	9	6	6	28	24	+4

Source: BDFutbol

==== Results by round ====
Round	1	2	3	4	5	6	7	8	9	10	11	12	13	14	15	16	17	18	19	20	21	22	23	24	25	26	27	28	29	30	31	32	33	34	35	36	37	38	39	40	41	42
Ground	H	A	H	A	H	A	H	A	H	A	A	H	A	H	A	H	A	H	A	H	A	A	H	A	H	A	H	A	H	A	H	H	A	H	A	H	A	H	A	H	A	H
Result	W	W	L	W	W	D	W	L	W	W	L	W	L	L	D	D	L	D	W	W	D	W	D	W	D	L	D	D	L	W	D	L	D	W	W	W	W	W	L	W	D	W
Position	4	2	5	3	2	3	2	3	2	1	3	1	3	3	4	4	4	6	5	4	4	3	3	2	2	2	2	2	5	3	3	5	5	2	1	1	1	1	1	1	1	1

Source: BDFutbol
A = Away; H = Home; W = Win; D = Draw; L = Loss

==== Matches ====
21 August 1999 1	Las Palmas	2–0	Tenerife	Las Palmas
				Stadium: Estadio Insular

29 August 1999 2	Sporting Gijón	1–2	Las Palmas	Gijón
				Stadium: El Molinón

5 September 1999 3	Las Palmas	1–2	Recreativo	Las Palmas
				Stadium: Estadio Insular

11 September 1999 4	Toledo	1–3	Las Palmas	Toledo

18 September 1999 5	Las Palmas	2–0	Mérida	Las Palmas
				Stadium: Estadio Insular

25 September 1999 6	Atlético Madrid B	0–0	Las Palmas	Madrid

2 October 1999 7	Las Palmas	7–1	Leganés	Las Palmas
				Stadium: Estadio Insular

9 October 1999 8	Osasuna	1–0	Las Palmas	Pamplona

13 October 1999 9	Las Palmas	2–1	Compostela	Las Palmas
				Stadium: Estadio Insular

17 October 1999 10	Córdoba	1–2	Las Palmas	Córdoba
				Stadium: Estadio Nuevo Arcángel

23 October 1999 11	Extremadura	2–1	Las Palmas	Almendralejo
				Stadium: Estadio Francisco de la Hera

30 October 1999 12	Las Palmas	1–0	Logroñés	Las Palmas
				Stadium: Estadio Insular

7 November 1999 13	Lleida	4–1	Las Palmas	Lleida

14 November 1999 14	Las Palmas	0–2	Salamanca	Las Palmas
				Stadium: Estadio Insular

20 November 1999 15	Albacete	1–1	Las Palmas	Albacete
				Stadium: Estadio Carlos Belmonte

27 November 1999 16	Las Palmas	0–0	Badajoz	Las Palmas
				Stadium: Estadio Insular

5 December 1999 17	Getafe	2–1	Las Palmas	Getafe
				Stadium: Coliseum Alfonso Pérez

11 December 1999 18	Las Palmas	1–1	Eibar	Las Palmas
				Stadium: Estadio Insular

19 December 1999 19	Elche	0–3	Las Palmas	Elche
				Stadium: Estadio Manuel Martínez Valero

4 January 2000 20	Las Palmas	2–1	Villarreal	Las Palmas
				Stadium: Estadio Insular

9 January 2000 21	Levante	1–1	Las Palmas	Valencia

16 January 2000 22	Tenerife	1–2	Las Palmas	Santa Cruz de Tenerife
				Stadium: Estadio Heliodoro Rodríguez López

22 January 2000 23	Las Palmas	1–1	Sporting Gijón	Las Palmas
				Stadium: Estadio Insular

29 January 2000 24	Recreativo	0–2	Las Palmas	Huelva

5 February 2000 25	Las Palmas	0–0	Toledo	Las Palmas
				Stadium: Estadio Insular

13 February 2000 26	Mérida	3–0	Las Palmas	Mérida

19 February 2000 27	Las Palmas	1–1	Atlético Madrid B	Las Palmas
				Stadium: Estadio Insular

27 February 2000 28	Leganés	0–0	Las Palmas	Leganés

5 March 2000 29	Las Palmas	0–2	Osasuna	Las Palmas
				Stadium: Estadio Insular

11 March 2000 30	Compostela	0–2	Las Palmas	Santiago de Compostela
				Stadium: Estadio Multiusos de San Lázaro

18 March 2000 31	Las Palmas	1–1	Córdoba	Las Palmas
				Stadium: Estadio Insular

26 March 2000 32	Las Palmas	0–1	Extremadura	Las Palmas
				Stadium: Estadio Insular

1 April 2000 33	Logroñés	1–1	Las Palmas	Logroño
				Stadium: Estadio Las Gaunas

8 April 2000 34	Las Palmas	1–0	Lleida	Las Palmas
				Stadium: Estadio Insular

16 April 2000 35	Salamanca	0–2	Las Palmas	Salamanca

22 April 2000 36	Las Palmas	2–1	Albacete	Las Palmas
				Stadium: Estadio Insular

29 April 2000 37	Badajoz	0–2	Las Palmas	Badajoz
				Stadium: Estadio Nuevo Vivero

6 May 2000 38	Las Palmas	2–0	Getafe	Las Palmas
				Stadium: Estadio Insular

13 May 2000 39	Eibar	4–1	Las Palmas	Eibar

21 May 2000 40	Las Palmas	4–1	Elche	Las Palmas
				Stadium: Estadio Insular

28 May 2000 41	Villarreal	1–1	Las Palmas	Villarreal

4 June 2000 42	Las Palmas	2–1	Levante	Las Palmas
				Stadium: Estadio Insular

=== Copa del Rey ===
==== First round ====
10 November 1999 First leg	Badajoz	1–1	Las Palmas	Badajoz
				Stadium: Estadio Nuevo Vivero

1 December 1999 Second leg	Las Palmas	1–0 (2–1 agg.)	Badajoz	Las Palmas
				Stadium: Estadio Insular

==== Second round ====
15 December 1999 First leg	Las Palmas	2–2	Atlético Madrid	Las Palmas
				Stadium: Estadio Insular

11 January 2000 Second leg	Atlético Madrid	1–0 (3–2 agg.)	Las Palmas	Madrid
				Stadium: Vicente Calderón Stadium
