= Álex Castro =

Spanish footballer

Personal information
- Full name: Alejandro Castro Martín
- Date of birth: 20 December 1974 (age 51)
- Place of birth: Las Palmas, Spain
- Height: 1.73 m (5 ft 8 in)
- Position: Midfielder

Team information
- Current team: Las Palmas (youth assistant)

Senior career*
Years	Team	Apps	(Gls)
1995–1997	Las Palmas B		
1997–2004	Las Palmas	85	(0)
2001	→ Tenerife (loan)	9	(0)
2001–2002	→ Numancia (loan)	23	(0)
2004–2007	Castillo	53+	(3+)
2007–2008	San Isidro	34	(1)
2008–2009	Villa Santa Brígida	27	(1)
2009–2011	Acodetti		
2011–2012	Teror		
2012–2013	Ferreras		
2013–2014	Arucas		
Total		231+	(5+)

Managerial career
- 2014–2016: San Antonio (assistant)
- 2016–2019: Las Palmas C (assistant)
- * Club domestic league appearances and goals

Alejandro "Álex" Castro Martín (born 20 December 1974) is a Spanish former footballer. Mainly a midfielder, he could also play as a left-back. He is the current assistant manager of UD Las Palmas' Juvenil squad.

== Club career ==
Born in Las Palmas, Castro spent the vast majority of his professional career in his native Canary Islands. He made his professional debut with UD Las Palmas, coming on as a second-half substitute in a 4–2 home win against Levante UD on 17 May 1997 in the Segunda División. His only other appearance of the season was on 15 June, as he played the entirety of the 3–0 away victory over CD Toledo.

From 1998 to 2000 Castro contributed 56 league appearances, including 31 in the latter campaign to help his team to promote to La Liga as champions. His first and only game in the top flight occurred on 1 October 2000, 27 minutes into a 5–1 away loss to Valencia CF. In January of the following year, he was loaned to neighbouring CD Tenerife of the second division, joining in the same situation fellow league club CD Numancia roughly one year later.

Castro subsequently returned to Las Palmas, being relegated from the second tier in 2004. He retired in 2014 at the age of 40, after spells in the Segunda División B with Castillo CF, CD San Isidro and UD Villa de Santa Brígida, and in the regional leagues with Acodetti CF, UD Teror Balompié, Ferreras CF and Arucas CF.

== Personal life ==
Castro was one of five brothers, of which Guillermo and Rubén were also footballers. All three came through at their hometown club, with the youngest enjoying his greatest success at Real Betis.
