= Guillermo Castro =

Guillermo Castro may refer to:

- Guillermo Castro (soldier) (1810-?), Mexican soldier and magistrate
- Guillermo Castro (Salvadoran footballer) (born 1940), Salvadoran footballer
- Guillermo Castro (Spanish footballer) (born 1973), Spanish footballer
