= Canary Islands derby =

Rivalry between two Spanish football teams

Canary Islands Derby
- Location: Canary Islands
- Teams: CD Tenerife; UD Las Palmas
- First meeting: Tenerife 1–2 Las Palmas; 1949–50 Tercera División (30 April 1950)
- Latest meeting: Tenerife 2–0 Las Palmas; 2023–24 Copa del Rey (7 January 2024)
- Stadiums: Estadio Heliodoro Rodríguez López (Tenerife); Estadio Gran Canaria (Las Palmas)

Statistics
- Total meetings: 75
- All-time series: Draw: 26; Las Palmas: 28; Tenerife: 21
- Largest victory: Tenerife 3–0 Las Palmas; 2013–14 Segunda División (4 December 2013); Tenerife 4–1 Las Palmas; 2022–23 Segunda División (18 March 2023)

The Canary Islands derby is any football match contested between Spanish sides UD Las Palmas and CD Tenerife, who are regarded as the top two sides in the Canary Islands. World Soccer Magazine rated it as one of the 50 greatest rivalries in the world, and it is considered one of the most important derbies in Spain.

== History ==
The two teams, based on different islands, have been the Canary Islands' top two sides virtually since their establishment. Both sides have experienced spells in Spain's top division, La Liga. UD Las Palmas' greatest successes came in the 1960s and 70s, in a period when they came runners-up in La Liga just behind Real Madrid and in the Spanish Cup (losing to FC Barcelona in the final), competing in the Inter-Cities Fairs Cup (now UEFA Europa League) in 1969, and UEFA cup two times in 1972 and 1977. Tenerife's greatest successes came in the 1990s; they recorded their best ever league finish in 1992–93 and in 1995–96, in which they finished 5th. In 1996–97, they reached the semi-finals of the UEFA Cup, losing to eventual winners Schalke 04.

The first contested match between the two took place under peculiar circumstances in the wake of Las Palmas's formation from its five constituent clubs. For only the 1949–50 season of the third division, the regional champions of Gran Canaria and Tenerife were placed alongside 4 top teams from the Tercera División in the "Final Phase", and the top two teams from this group would advance to the second tier. Las Palmas performed well enough in the group to win promotion, but Tenerife fell far short, only winning a single match and losing both games against Las Palmas. This promotion system was abolished the next year, and the two would not meet again until 1953.

== Stadia ==
=== UD Las Palmas ===
Since 2003, UD Las Palmas play their home games at the Estadio Gran Canaria which has a capacity of 31,250. Located in the island's capital city of Las Palmas, the stadium is the biggest in the Canary Islands. In 2007 it hosted a Spain international friendly against Northern Ireland, which Spain won 1-0 with a goal from Xavi.

=== CD Tenerife ===
CD Tenerife play their home games at the Estadio Heliodoro Rodríguez López which holds 23,000. Located in the island's capital city of Santa Cruz, it has hosted four Spain internationals, against Germany, Switzerland, Poland and Slovakia respectively.

== Head to head ==
As of 7 January 2024, there have been 75 official Canary Island derbies. 26 were drawn, UD Las Palmas won 28, and CD Tenerife won 21.

=== Las Palmas stats ===
- Wins: 28
- Draws: 26
- Defeats: 21
- Goals scored: 85
- Goals conceded: 74

=== Tenerife stats ===
- Wins: 21
- Draws: 26
- Defeats: 28
- Goals scored: 74
- Goals conceded: 85

== All-time results ==
League

		UD Las Palmas vs CD Tenerife				CD Tenerife vs UD Las Palmas			
Season	Division	Date	Venue	Score	Attendance	Date	Venue	Score	Attendance
1949-50	Tercera División (Fase Final)	4 June 1950	Estadio Insular	1 – 0		30 April 1950	Estadio Heliodoro Rodríguez López	1 – 2	
1953–54	Segunda División	27 December 1953	Estadio Insular	1 – 1		25 April 1953	Estadio Heliodoro Rodríguez López	0 – 0	
1960–61	Segunda División	13 November 1960	Estadio Insular	0 – 0		5 March 1961	Estadio Heliodoro Rodríguez López	1 – 0	
1962–63	Segunda División	11 November 1962	Estadio Insular	0 – 1		10 March 1963	Estadio Heliodoro Rodríguez López	0 – 1	
1963–64	Segunda División	15 March 1964	Estadio Insular	1 – 0		17 November 1963	Estadio Heliodoro Rodríguez López	1 – 1	
1983–84	Segunda División	20 May 1984	Estadio Insular	0 – 2		8 January 1984	Estadio Heliodoro Rodríguez López	0 – 0	
1984–85	Segunda División	12 May 1985	Estadio Insular	1 – 0		29 December 1984	Estadio Heliodoro Rodríguez López	0 – 0	
1988–89	Segunda División	21 February 1989	Estadio Insular	2 – 2		18 September 1988	Estadio Heliodoro Rodríguez López	3 – 1	
1999–2000	Segunda División	21 August 1999	Estadio Insular	2 – 0		16 January 2000	Estadio Heliodoro Rodríguez López	1 – 2	
2001–02	Primera División	5 May 2002	Estadio Insular	0 – 1		22 December 2001	Estadio Heliodoro Rodríguez López	1 – 3	
2002–03	Segunda División	25 January 2003	Estadio Insular	1 – 0		21 June 2003	Estadio Heliodoro Rodríguez López	0 – 0	
2003–04	Segunda División	4 October 2003	Estadio Gran Canaria	1 – 1	21,925	7 March 2004	Estadio Heliodoro Rodríguez López	2 – 0	22,325
2006–07	Segunda División	21 October 2006	Estadio Gran Canaria	0 – 0	20,264	24 March 2007	Estadio Heliodoro Rodríguez López	3 – 1	18,302
2007–08	Segunda División	5 April 2008	Estadio Gran Canaria	1 – 1	29,132	3 November 2007	Estadio Heliodoro Rodríguez López	2 – 2	17,693
2008–09	Segunda División	22 November 2008	Estadio Gran Canaria	0 – 1	26,161	25 April 2009	Estadio Heliodoro Rodríguez López	2 – 0	21,647
2010–11	Segunda División	4 June 2011	Estadio Gran Canaria	1 – 0	22,032	23 January 2011	Estadio Heliodoro Rodríguez López	1 – 1	20,275
2013–14	Segunda División	10 May 2014	Estadio Gran Canaria	1 – 0	31,123	4 December 2013	Estadio Heliodoro Rodríguez López	3 – 0	18,040
2014–15	Segunda División	1 March 2015	Estadio Gran Canaria	1 – 1	28,032	28 September 2014	Estadio Heliodoro Rodríguez López	2 – 1	17,064
2018–19	Segunda División	16 December 2018	Estadio Gran Canaria	1 – 1	19,190	4 May 2019	Estadio Heliodoro Rodríguez López	2 – 1	18,717
2019–20	Segunda División	25 January 2020	Estadio Gran Canaria	0 – 0	21,248	7 September 2019	Estadio Heliodoro Rodríguez López	0 – 0	18,000
2020–21	Segunda División	15 November 2020	Estadio Gran Canaria	1 – 0	0	27 March 2021	Estadio Heliodoro Rodríguez López	1 – 1	0
2021–22	Segunda División (including play-offs)	16 October 2021	Estadio Gran Canaria	2 – 1	0	2 February 2022	Estadio Heliodoro Rodríguez López	0 – 1	10,751
2021–22	Segunda División (including play-offs)	4 June 2022	Estadio Gran Canaria	1 – 2	31,502	1 June 2022	Estadio Heliodoro Rodríguez López	1 – 0	19,702
2022–23	Segunda División	27 November 2022	Estadio Gran Canaria	3 – 1	31,047	18 March 2023	Estadio Heliodoro Rodríguez López	4 – 1	17,959

== Copa de Canarias ==
The Copa de Canarias is a friendly tournament played between Las Palmas and Tenerife since 2011 in a double-leg format. Since 2012, the tournament is sponsored by the Spanish brewery Mahou and is thus titledCopa Mahou Canarias.

In 2018 the competition was reduced to a single game.

Year	Winner	Runner-up	1st leg			2nd leg		
Year	Winner	Runner-up	Score	Att.	V	Score	Att.	V
2011	UD Las Palmas	CD Tenerife	3 – 0	7,332	LP	0 – 1	5,952	TF
2012	UD Las Palmas	CD Tenerife	0 – 0	2,382	TF	1 – 0	5,832	LP
2013	CD Tenerife	UD Las Palmas	2 – 0	4,630	TF	0 – 0	9,540	LP
2014	UD Las Palmas	CD Tenerife	0 – 2	5,990	TF	2 – 0	12,291	LP
2015	CD Tenerife	UD Las Palmas	1 – 0	4,325	TF	0 – 1	12,023	LP
2016	CD Tenerife	UD Las Palmas	0 – 1	7,000 (Note: Game played in Maspalomas.)	LP	0 – 1	6,557	TF
2017	UD Las Palmas	CD Tenerife	2 – 2	600 (Note: Game played in Los Cristianos.)	TF	2 – 0	7,000	LP
2018	CD Tenerife	UD Las Palmas	0 – 0 (5–4 p)	6,000	Single game			

== Kits ==
UD Las Palmas play in yellow shirts with blue shorts and blue socks.

C.D. Tenerife play in blue and white shirts with blue shorts and white socks.
