= Rubén Castro =

Spanish footballer

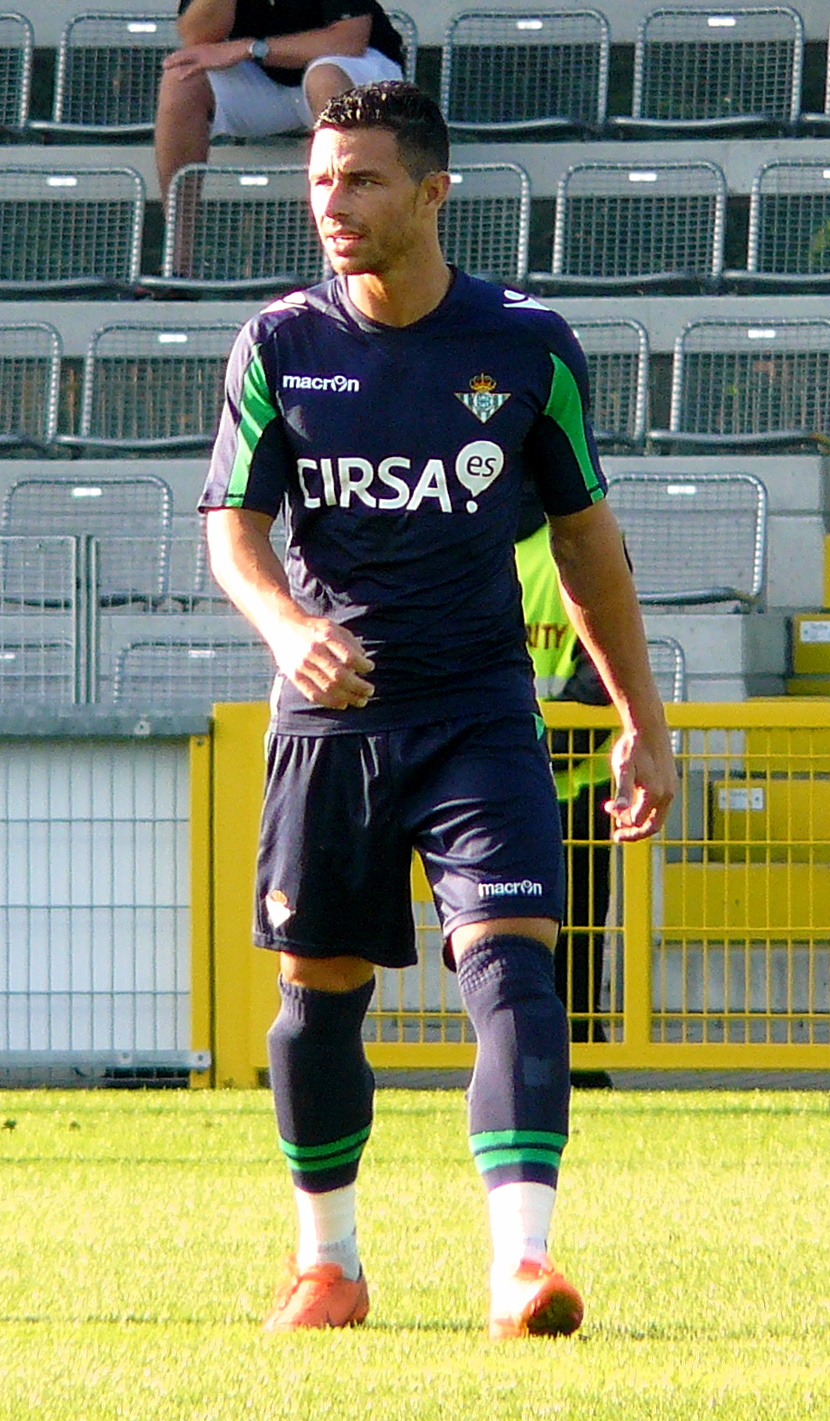
- Castro with Betis in 2012

Personal information
- Full name: Rubén Castro Martín
- Date of birth: 27 June 1981 (age 45)
- Place of birth: Las Palmas, Spain
- Height: 1.69 m (5 ft 7 in)
- Position: Striker

Youth career
- Artesano
- Las Palmas

Senior career*
Years	Team	Apps	(Gls)
2000–2001	Las Palmas B	34	(13)
2001–2004	Las Palmas	112	(36)
2004–2010	Deportivo La Coruña	31	(4)
2004–2005	→ Albacete (loan)	22	(3)
2006	→ Racing Santander (loan)	1	(0)
2007	→ Gimnàstic (loan)	20	(4)
2008–2009	→ Huesca (loan)	41	(13)
2009–2010	→ Rayo Vallecano (loan)	42	(14)
2010–2018	Betis	260	(135)
2017	→ Guizhou Zhicheng (loan)	12	(7)
2018–2020	Las Palmas	65	(30)
2020–2022	Cartagena	82	(39)
2022–2023	Málaga	41	(10)
Total		763	(308)

International career
2002–2003	Spain U21	6	(4)
- * Club domestic league appearances and goals

Rubén Castro Martín (Spanish pronunciation: [ruˈβeŋ ˈkastɾo maɾˈtin]; (Note: In isolation, Rubén is pronounced [ruˈβen].) born 27 June 1981) is a Spanish former professional footballer who played mainly as a striker.

He represented mainly Las Palmas and Betis during his career, appearing in 282 matches in La Liga and 435 in Segunda División (scoring an all-time best 195 goals in the latter competition). He also competed in China.

== Club career ==
=== Las Palmas and Deportivo ===
Born in Las Palmas, Canary Islands, Castro was signed by Deportivo de La Coruña from local UD Las Palmas in 2004, in a deal which also saw Momo moving in the opposite direction. The deal was agreed in order to wipe out the debt that Las Palmas still had after signing Gabriel Schürrer from Deportivo for €3.6 million.

Castro scored his first goals for Las Palmas in La Liga in the 2001–02 season, when he came on as a substitute in the 64th minute of a home fixture against Real Madrid, with the score at 2–2; the match ended 4–2 for the hosts, courtesy of him. In the 2003–04 campaign he was crowned Pichichi Trophy of the Segunda División for his hometown club, netting 22 times – with the team being nonetheless relegated – and being subsequently purchased by Depor.

At the beginning of 2006–07, Castro was on loan at Racing de Santander, but he left Cantabria due to a lack of playing opportunities. During the January transfer window another loan happened, this time to Catalonia's Gimnàstic de Tarragona where he started very well with three goals in his first three matches, although the side would be eventually relegated and the player returned to Deportivo.

After appearing scarcely during the 2007–08 season, Castro was loaned again in July 2008, to newly-promoted second division club SD Huesca. There, his goals proved crucial for the Aragonese as they retained their recently obtained status.

In late August 2009, Castro was again loaned by Deportivo and also in division two, now to Rayo Vallecano. For the second year in a row he repeated team position (11th) and goals scored (14), returning in June to the Galicians.

=== Betis ===
In August 2010, Castro was sold to Real Betis for a fee of €1.7 million. The attacking trio of himself, Jorge Molina and midfielder Achille Emaná combined for more than 50 league goals in 2010–11, as the Andalusians returned to the top tier after two years of absence.

Castro scored his first goal in the competition in nearly four years on 27 August 2011, in a local derby at Granada CF (1–0 win, netting five minutes from time). He repeated exactly the same feat the following matchday, against RCD Mallorca.

On 10 December 2011, Castro put a stop to a streak of 11 games without one win for the Pepe Mel-led side with only one point managed, netting twice in stoppage time of the 2–1 home victory over Valencia CF. He finished the campaign with 16 goals – third-best national scorer, eighth overall – as the Verdiblancos finally finished in 13th position.

Castro scored 66 goals in all competitions from 2012 to 2015, including 31 in league in the latter season to help Betis return to the top flight as champions. He celebrated his 200th appearance in the competition with a goal, helping to a 1–1 home draw with Villarreal CF.

In July 2017, aged 36, Castro moved abroad for the first time in his career, being loaned to Chinese Super League club Guizhou Hengfeng Zhicheng F.C. for five months. In his first match upon his return to the Estadio Benito Villamarín, on 15 January 2018, he replaced Sergio León late into the home fixture against CD Leganés and scored the 3–2 winner through a penalty.

=== Las Palmas return ===
On 13 July 2018, after cutting ties with Betis, the 37-year-old Castro returned to Las Palmas on a two-year contract. He scored 15 times in the second division in each of his seasons.

=== Cartagena ===
Castro agreed to a one-year deal at second-division newcomers FC Cartagena on 12 September 2020. He scored 19 goals during the season, as they avoided relegation.

The following campaign, as the team again managed to stay afloat, Castro scored 20 times.

=== Málaga ===
On 7 July 2022, aged 41, Castro signed for one year with Málaga CF. In June 2023, following the club's second-tier relegation in spite of his ten goals, he left after his contract expired.

Castro retired on 7 June 2024.

== International career ==
Castro earned six caps for Spain at under-21 level. On 19 November 2002, he scored two of his four goals in a 7–1 friendly rout of Bulgaria held in Guadix.

== Personal life ==
Castro's two older brothers – Rubén was the youngest of five siblings – Guillermo and Alejandro, were also footballers. At one point in their careers, they also represented Las Palmas.

In 2013, his fiancée pressed charges against him for domestic violence. He was released on bail and, two years later, Betis fans offered chants of support to the footballer.

== Career statistics ==
Appearances and goals by club, season and competition
Club	Season	League			Cup		Continental		Other		Total	
Club	Season	Division	Apps	Goals	Apps	Goals	Apps	Goals	Apps	Goals	Apps	Goals
Las Palmas	2000–01	La Liga	3	0	0	0	—		—		3	0
Las Palmas	2001–02	La Liga	29	5	2	1	—		—		31	6
Las Palmas	2002–03	Segunda División	40	9	1	1	—		—		41	10
Las Palmas	2003–04	Segunda División	40	22	0	0	—		—		40	22
Las Palmas	Total		112	36	3	2	—		—		115	38
Albacete	2004–05	La Liga	22	3	0	0	—		—		22	3
Deportivo	2005–06	La Liga	24	3	1	1	8 (Note: Appearances in UEFA Intertoto Cup)	4	—		33	8
Racing Santander	2006–07	La Liga	1	0	0	0	—		—		1	0
Gimnàstic	2006–07	La Liga	20	4	0	0	—		—		20	4
Deportivo	2007–08	La Liga	7	1	2	0	—		—		9	1
Huesca	2008–09	Segunda División	41	13	1	1	—		—		42	14
Rayo Vallecano	2009–10	Segunda División	42	14	2	1	—		—		44	15
Betis	2010–11	Segunda División	42	27	7	5	—		—		49	32
Betis	2011–12	La Liga	34	16	1	0	—		—		35	16
Betis	2012–13	La Liga	34	18	6	3	—		—		40	21
Betis	2013–14	La Liga	25	10	3	1	6 (Note: Appearances in UEFA Europa League)	2	—		34	13
Betis	2014–15	Segunda División	42	31	4	1	—		—		46	32
Betis	2015–16	La Liga	38	19	2	0	—		—		40	19
Betis	2016–17	La Liga	35	13	1	0	—		—		36	13
Betis	2017–18	La Liga	10	1	0	0	—		—		10	1
Betis	Total		260	135	24	10	6	2	—		290	147
Guizhou Zhicheng	2017	Chinese Super League	12	7	0	0	—		—		12	7
Las Palmas	2018–19	Segunda División	41	15	1	0	—		—		42	15
Las Palmas	2019–20	Segunda División	24	15	0	0	—		—		24	15
Las Palmas	Total		65	30	1	0	—		—		66	30
Cartagena	2020–21	Segunda División	41	19	1	0	—		—		42	19
Cartagena	2021–22	Segunda División	41	20	1	0	—		—		42	20
Cartagena	Total		82	39	2	0	—		—		84	39
Málaga	2022–23	Segunda División	41	10	2	0	—		—		43	10
Career total			729	295	38	15	14	6	0	0	781	316

== Honours ==
Betis

- Segunda División: 2010–11, 2014–15

Individual

- Pichichi Trophy (Segunda División): 2003–04, 2014–15
- Segunda División Player of the Month: June 2020

Records

- Betis all-time top scorer: 147 goals
