= Orlando Quintana =

Spanish footballer

Personal information
- Full name: Orlando Quintana García
- Date of birth: 25 March 1978 (age 48)
- Place of birth: Las Palmas, Spain
- Height: 1.86 m (6 ft 1 in)
- Position: Goalkeeper

Youth career
- Huracán
- Real Artesano

Senior career*
| Years | Team | Apps | (Gls) |
| 1995–1996 | San Antonio | | |
| 1996–1997 | La Angostura | | |
| 1997–1998 | Villa Santa Brígida | | |
| 1998–2001 | Las Palmas B | | |
| 2001–2004 | Las Palmas | 43 | (0) |
| 2001–2002 | → Universidad LP (loan) | 21 | (0) |
| 2004–2005 | Celta | 3 | (0) |
| 2005–2007 | Lorca Deportiva | 9 | (0) |
| 2007–2008 | Mérida | 40 | (0) |
| 2008–2009 | Lorca Deportiva | 38 | (0) |
| 2009–2011 | Pontevedra | 77 | (0) |
| 2011–2013 | Ponferradina | 47 | (0) |
| 2013–2014 | Oviedo | 36 | (0) |
| 2014–2015 | Villa Santa Brígida | | |
| Total | | 314+ | (0) |
- * Club domestic league appearances and goals

Orlando Quintana García (born 25 March 1978 in Las Palmas, Canary Islands) is a Spanish former professional footballer who played as a goalkeeper.
