= Guillermo Castro (Spanish footballer) =

Spanish footballer

Guillermo Castro Martín (born 11 November 1973) is a Spanish retired footballer who played as a defender.

== Club career ==
Born in Las Palmas, Canary Islands, Castro spent the vast majority of his ten-year professional career with hometown clubs UD Las Palmas and Universidad de Las Palmas CF. He helped the former promote to Segunda División in 1996, making his debut in the competition on 31 August of that year by playing 45 minutes in a 0–0 away draw against UD Almería. On 2 November, he was sent off in the 2–1 home win over FC Barcelona B.

At the end of 1999–2000, Castro also won promotion with Universidad – a first ever – appearing in 35 games the following season in an immediate relegation. He split the 2001–02 campaign between Elche CF (second division) and AD Ceuta (Segunda División B).

Castro retired in 2004 at the age of 30, after a second spell with both Universidad and Las Palmas and following relegation from the second tier with the latter.

== Personal life ==
Castro was one of five brothers, of which Alejandro and Rubén were also footballers. All three came through at their hometown club, with the latter enjoying his greatest success at Real Betis.
