= Diego Percan =

Spanish footballer (born 2001)

Personal information
- Full name: Diego Pertejo Canseco
- Date of birth: 13 November 2001 (age 24)
- Place of birth: León, Spain
- Height: 1.79 m (5 ft 10 in)
- Position: Striker

Team information
- Current team: Córdoba
- Number: 6

Youth career
- 2007–2016: CD San Lorenzo
- 2016–2019: Cultural Leonesa

Senior career*
Years	Team	Apps	(Gls)
2019–2022	Júpiter Leonés	47	(15)
2021–2023	Cultural Leonesa	57	(9)
2023–2025	Barcelona B	32	(5)
2025–2026	Arka Gdynia	9	(0)
2026–	Córdoba	18	(2)
- * Club domestic league appearances and goals as of 6 June 2026

Diego Pertejo Canseco (born 13 November 2001), better known as Diego Percan, is a Spanish professional footballer who plays as a striker for Segunda División club Córdoba.

== Club career ==
He started his playing career at Cultural Leonesa's academy, graduating to its reserve team before making his senior debut against Athletic Bilbao's reserves on 12 September 2021.

In June 2025, aged 23, Percan left Spain to join the Polish Ekstraklasa club Arka Gdynia. He left the club on 1 January 2026 after making 10 appearances. Later that day, Percan signed with Segunda División side Córdoba until mid-2027.

== Style of play ==
Percan mainly operates as a winger or striker.

== Personal life ==
Percan is a native of León, Spain. He has regarded France international Karim Benzema as his football idol.

== Career statistics ==
As of match played 6 December 2025

Appearances and goals by club, season and competition
Club	Season	League			National cup (Note: Includes Copa del Rey, Polish Cup)		Other		Total	
Club	Season	Division	Apps	Goals	Apps	Goals	Apps	Goals	Apps	Goals
Júpiter Leonés	2018–19	Tercera División	2	1	—		—		2	1
Júpiter Leonés	2019–20	Tercera División	8	1	—		—		8	1
Júpiter Leonés	2020–21	Tercera División	22	4	—		2 (Note: Appearances in 2021 Tercera División play-offs)	1	24	5
Júpiter Leonés	2021–22	Tercera División RFEF	15	9	—		—		15	9
Júpiter Leonés	Total		47	15	0	0	2	1	49	16
Cultural Leonesa	2020-21	Segunda División B	2	0	0	0	—		2	0
Cultural Leonesa	2021-22	Primera División RFEF	18	1	2	0	—		20	1
Cultural Leonesa	2022-23	Primera Federación	37	8	—		—		37	8
Cultural Leonesa	Total		57	9	2	0	0	0	59	9
Barcelona B	2023–24	Primera Federación	30	5	—		—		30	5
Barcelona B	2024–25	Primera Federación	2	1	—		—		2	1
Barcelona B	Total		32	6	0	0	0	0	32	6
Arka Gdynia	2025–26	Ekstraklasa	9	0	1	0	—		10	0
Career total			145	31	3	0	2	1	150	31
