= Rafael Maceratesi =

Argentine footballer

Rafa Maceratesi
Personal information
- Full name: Rafael Nazareno Maceratesi
- Date of birth: April 2, 1975 (age 51)
- Place of birth: Elortondo, Argentina
- Height: 1.77 m (5 ft 10 in)
- Position: Striker

Senior career*
Years	Team	Apps	(Gls)
1995–2001	Rosario Central	102	(44)
2001–2002	Racing Club	23	(8)
2002–2003	Las Palmas	23	(9)
2003	Colón de Santa Fe	7	(0)
2004–2005	Estudiantes de La Plata	15	(3)
2006	Universitario	10	(1)
2006–2007	Niki Volos	33	(16)
2008	Deportivo Azogues	15	(11)
2009–2014	Atlético Elortondo	129	(81)
- * Club domestic league appearances and goals

Rafael Nazareno Maceratesi (April 2, 1976 in Elortondo, Santa Fe Province) is a former Argentine footballer who played as a striker. He debuted with Rosario Central in 1995, and retired from Athletic Elortondo on December 13, 2014. Maceratesi was most successful at Racing Club, where he won the 2001 Primera División Apertura, played in 15 games and scored five goals. With Atletico Elortondo, he played 129 matches and scored 81 goals.

== Biography ==
With Rosario Central Maceratesi excelled in the 2001 Copa Libertadores, reaching the semi-finals (where they lost to Cruz Azul). He played a total of 102 games and scored 44 goals. That year, he signed with Racing Club.

In the second half of 2002 Maceratesi went to Spain to play for Las Palmas, where he remained until mid-2003. He scored nine goals in 23 games. Maceratesi returned to Argentina and played seven games in six months with Columbus. In 2004 and 2005, he went to Estudiantes.

Maceratesi went to Peru in 2006, signing with Universitario. Due to injury, he scored only one goal (against Velez Sarsfield in the Libertadores Cup). Maceratesi left halfway through the season to play in Greece for Niki Volos, where he remained until 2007. He played for a few weeks with Deportivo Azogues in the Ecuadorian Serie B during the 2008–09 season before being sidelined for two months by a leg injury.

He played for Athletic Elortondo from 2009 to his retirement on December 13, 2014. In 129 games, Maceratesi scored 81 goals and is one of the club's top scorers. That season the team reached the semi-finals, losing to Club Sportivo Rivadavia and finishing third in the Liga Venadense de fútbol.
