= Josep Ferrando =

Spanish football manager

Personal information
- Full name: Josep Ferrando Sancho
- Date of birth: 5 October 1994 (age 32)
- Place of birth: Amposta, Spain
- Position: Midfielder

Team information
- Current team: Eldense (assistant)

Youth career
- Rapitenca

Senior career*
| Years | Team | Apps | (Gls) |
| 2013–2014 | Ampolla | | |
| 2014–2015 | Amposta | 3 | (0) |
| 2015–2018 | Ampolla | | |

Managerial career
- 2018–2025: Espanyol (youth)
- 2025–: Eldense (assistant)
- 2026: Eldense (caretaker)
- * Club domestic league appearances and goals

Josep Ferrando Sancho (born 5 October 1994) is a Spanish retired footballer who played as a midfielder, and the assistant manager of CD Eldense.

== Career ==
Born in Amposta, Tarragona, Catalonia, Ferrando played for UE Rapitenca, CF Ampolla and CF Amposta as a senior before retiring in 2018, aged 23. Upon retiring, he started working in the youth categories of RCD Espanyol, being initially an assistant of the Cadete squad.

In July 2023, Ferrando was named manager of the Infantil A team of the Pericos, before becoming Joan Suriol's assistant in the Juvenil A squad the following March. In July 2025, he joined the staff of Javier Cabello at CD Eldense, as an analyst.

Ferrando became an assistant when Claudio Barragán became manager of the Azulgranas in October 2025, and helped the club to achieve promotion to Segunda División. On 6 September 2026, he was appointed caretaker manager of the side, after Barragán was sacked.

On his professional debut on 13 September 2026, Ferrando led Eldense to a 1–0 away win over Sporting de Gijón.
