= Real Artesano FC =

Spanish football club

Real Artesano
- Full name: Real Artesano Fútbol Club
- Founded: 1909
- Dissolved: 2002
- Ground: El Hornillo, Telde, Gran Canaria, Canary Islands, Spain
- Capacity: 3,500
- 2001–02: Primera Regional de Las Palmas – Group 1, 9th of 18
Home colours

Real Artesano Fútbol Club was a Spanish football team based in Las Palmas de Gran Canaria, in the Canary Islands. Founded in 1909, the club was dissolved in 2002.

== History ==
Founded in 1909 as Artesano Football Club, the club was renamed to Artesano Club de Fútbol in 1912. In 1980, they achieved a first-ever promotion to Tercera División.

In 1983, Artesano CF was renamed to Artesano Fútbol Club, but suffered relegation in that season. Back to the fourth division in 1987, the club suffered another relegation in 1990, and after winning the Interinsular Preferente in the following year, they again changed name to Real Artesano Fútbol Club.

Relegated from Tercera in 1997, Real Artesano suffered another drop in 2001, and ceased activities in the following year.

== Season to season ==
| Season | Tier | Division | Place | Copa del Rey |
|---|---|---|---|---|
| 1929–1939 | — | Regional | — | |
| 1939–40 | 6 | 3ª Reg. | 6th | |
| 1940–41 | 6 | 3ª Reg. | | |
| 1941–42 | 5 | 3ª Reg. | 2nd | |
| 1942–43 | 5 | 3ª Reg. | 1st | |
| 1943–44 | 6 | 3ª Reg. | 4th | |
| 1944–45 | 6 | 3ª Reg. | 2nd | |
| 1945–46 | 5 | 2ª Reg. | 2nd | |
| 1946–47 | 5 | 2ª Reg. | 2nd | |
| 1947–48 | 5 | 2ª Reg. | 1st | |
| 1948–49 | 5 | 2ª Reg. | 1st | |
| 1949–50 | 5 | 2ª Reg. | 3rd | |
| 1950–51 | 4 | 1ª Reg. | 7th | |
| 1951–52 | 4 | 1ª Reg. | 4th | |
| 1952–53 | 4 | 1ª Reg. | 4th | |
| 1953–54 | 4 | 1ª Reg. | 4th | |
| 1954–55 | 4 | 1ª Reg. | 5th | |
| 1955–56 | 4 | 1ª Reg. | 5th | |
| 1956–57 | 5 | 2ª Reg. | | |
| 1957–58 | 5 | 2ª Reg. | | |

| Season | Tier | Division | Place | Copa del Rey |
|---|---|---|---|---|
| 1958–59 | 5 | 2ª Reg. | 2nd | |
| 1959–60 | 4 | 1ª Reg. | 3rd | |
| 1960–61 | 4 | 1ª Reg. | 5th | |
| 1961–62 | 4 | 1ª Reg. | 3rd | |
| 1962–63 | 4 | 1ª Reg. | 4th | |
| 1963–64 | 4 | 1ª Reg. | 6th | |
| 1964–65 | 4 | 1ª Reg. | 3rd | |
| 1965–66 | 4 | 1ª Reg. | 2nd | |
| 1966–67 | 4 | 1ª Reg. | 8th | |
| 1967–68 | 5 | 2ª Reg. | 2nd | |
| 1968–69 | 5 | 2ª Reg. | 4th | |
| 1969–70 | 5 | 2ª Reg. | 1st | |
| 1970–71 | 4 | 1ª Reg. | 5th | |
| 1971–72 | 4 | 1ª Reg. | 1st | |
| 1972–73 | 4 | 1ª Reg. | 7th | |
| 1973–74 | 4 | 1ª Reg. | 4th | |
| 1974–75 | 4 | 1ª Reg. | 5th | |
| 1975–76 | 4 | 1ª Reg. | 1st | |
| 1976–77 | 4 | 1ª Reg. | 2nd | |
| 1977–78 | 5 | Reg. Pref. | 5th | |

| Season | Tier | Division | Place | Copa del Rey |
|---|---|---|---|---|
| 1978–79 | 5 | Reg. Pref. | 4th | |
| 1979–80 | 5 | Reg. Pref. | 8th | |
| 1980–81 | 4 | 3ª | 13th | |
| 1981–82 | 4 | 3ª | 8th | |
| 1982–83 | 4 | 3ª | 10th | |
| 1983–84 | 4 | 3ª | 20th | |
| 1984–85 | 5 | Reg. Pref. | 5th | |
| 1985–86 | 5 | Reg. Pref. | 10th | |
| 1986–87 | 5 | Reg. Pref. | 2nd | |
| 1987–88 | 4 | 3ª | 17th | |
| 1988–89 | 4 | 3ª | 10th | |
| 1989–90 | 4 | 3ª | 20th | |

| Season | Tier | Division | Place | Copa del Rey |
|---|---|---|---|---|
| 1990–91 | 5 | Int. Pref. | 1st | |
| 1991–92 | 4 | 3ª | 10th | |
| 1992–93 | 4 | 3ª | 17th | |
| 1993–94 | 4 | 3ª | 16th | |
| 1994–95 | 4 | 3ª | 13th | |
| 1995–96 | 4 | 3ª | 17th | |
| 1996–97 | 4 | 3ª | 20th | |
| 1997–98 | 5 | Int. Pref. | 12th | |
| 1998–99 | 5 | Int. Pref. | 5th | |
| 1999–2000 | 5 | Int. Pref. | 6th | |
| 2000–01 | 5 | Int. Pref. | 18th | |
| 2001–02 | 6 | 1ª Reg. | 9th | |

- 13 seasons in Tercera División
