= 2003–04 Segunda División =

73rd season of the second-tier football league in Spain

Segunda División
- Season: 2003-04
- Champions: Levante UD
- Promoted: Levante; Getafe CF; CD Numancia
- Relegated: CD Leganés; UD Las Palmas; Rayo Vallecano; Algeciras CF
- Matches: 462
- Goals: 1,024 (2.22 per match)
- Top goalscorer: (Spain) Rubén Castro

The 2003–04 Segunda División season saw 22 teams participate in the second flight Spanish league. The teams that were promoted to La Liga were Levante UD, Getafe CF, and CD Numancia. The teams that were relegated to Segunda División B were CD Leganés, UD Las Palmas, Rayo Vallecano, and Algeciras CF.

== Teams ==
Location of teams in Segunda División 2003–04
Canary Islands

Team	Home city	Stadium	Capacity
Alavés*	Vitoria-Gasteiz	Mendizorrotza	19,840
Algeciras**	Algeciras	Nuevo Mirador	7,200
Almería	Almería	Juan Rojas	13,468
Cádiz**	Cádiz	Ramón de Carranza	23,000
Ciudad de Murcia**	Murcia	La Condomina	17,000
Córdoba	Córdoba	Nuevo Arcángel	21,822
Eibar	Eibar	Ipurua	5,000
Elche	Elche	Martínez Valero	36,017
Getafe	Getafe	Coliseum Alfonso Pérez	17,393
Las Palmas	Las Palmas	Gran Canaria	32,400
Leganés	Leganés	Butarque	8,138
Levante	Valencia	Ciutat de València	26,354
Málaga B**	Málaga	La Rosaleda	28,963
Numancia	Soria	Los Pajaritos	8,261
Polideportivo Ejido	El Ejido	Santo Domingo	7,870
Rayo Vallecano*	Madrid	Teresa Rivero	14,708
Recreativo de Huelva*	Huelva	Nuevo Colombino	21,670
Salamanca	Villares de la Reina	Helmántico	17,341
Sporting de Gijón	Gijón	El Molinón	25,885
Tenerife	Santa Cruz de Tenerife	Heliodoro Rodríguez López	22,824
Terrassa	Terrassa	Olímpic de Terrassa	11,500
Xerez	Jerez de la Frontera	Chapín	20,523

(*) Relegated from La Liga.

(**) Promoted from Segunda División B.

=== Teams by Autonomous Community ===
	Autonomous community	Number of teams	Teams
1	Andalusia	8	Algeciras, Almería, Cádiz, Córdoba, Málaga B, Poli Ejido, Recreativo, Xerez
2	Madrid	3	Getafe, Leganés, Rayo Vallecano
3	Basque Country	2	Alavés, Eibar
3	Canary Islands	2	Las Palmas, Tenerife
3	Castile and León	2	Numancia, Salamanca
3	Valencia	2	Elche, Levante
7	Asturias	1	Sporting
7	Catalonia	1	Terrassa
7	Murcia	1	Ciudad de Murcia

== Final table ==
Pos	Team	Pld	W	D	L	GF	GA	GD	Pts	Promotion or relegation
1	Levante (C, P)	42	22	13	7	59	33	+26	79	Promotion to La Liga
2	Getafe (P)	42	20	16	6	55	38	+17	76 (Note: NUM 0-0 GET; GET 2-1 NUM)	Promotion to La Liga
3	Numancia (P)	42	22	10	10	60	30	+30	76	Promotion to La Liga
4	Alavés	42	20	14	8	48	32	+16	74	
5	Sporting Gijón	42	20	10	12	58	40	+18	70	
6	Recreativo	42	14	20	8	45	34	+11	62	
7	Cádiz	42	17	10	15	52	47	+5	61	
8	Tenerife	42	11	21	10	40	40	0	54 (Note: XER 0-0 TEN; TEN 2-1 XER)	
9	Xerez	42	12	18	12	47	49	−2	54	
10	Eibar	42	12	16	14	44	39	+5	52	
11	Salamanca	42	10	21	11	47	44	+3	51	
12	Terrassa	42	12	14	16	45	50	−5	50 (Note: TER: 8 pts; ALM: 5 pts; ELC: 2 pts)	
13	Almería	42	11	17	14	45	49	−4	50	
14	Elche	42	13	11	18	50	63	−13	50	
15	Málaga B	42	11	16	15	46	56	−10	49 (Note: MálB: 11 pts; CÓR: 9 pts; CMU: 8 pts; EJI: 3 pts)	
16	Córdoba	42	11	16	15	37	42	−5	49	
17	Ciudad de Murcia	42	11	16	15	51	63	−12	49	
18	Poli Ejido	42	12	13	17	29	40	−11	49	
19	Leganés (R)	42	9	19	14	36	47	−11	46	Relegation to Segunda División B
20	Las Palmas (R)	42	10	14	18	46	68	−22	44	Relegation to Segunda División B
21	Rayo Vallecano (R)	42	11	10	21	45	63	−18	43	Relegation to Segunda División B
22	Algeciras (R)	42	6	15	21	39	57	−18	33	Relegation to Segunda División B

Source: LFP - Liga Adelante
Rules for classification: 1st points; 2nd head-to-head points; 3rd head-to-head goal difference; 4th head-to-head goals scored; 5th goal difference; 6th number of goals scored; 7th Fair-play points
(C) Champions; (P) Promoted; (R) Relegated

== Results ==
Home \ Away	ALA	ALG	ALM	CÁD	CMU	CÓR	EIB	ELC	GET	LPA	LEG	LEV	MÁB	NUM	EJI	RAY	REC	SAL	SPO	TEN	TER	XER
Alavés	—	1–1	2–0	2–0	1–0	1–0	0–2	2–1	3–0	1–0	1–1	3–2	1–0	1–1	0–0	3–0	1–1	1–0	2–1	0–0	0–1	1–1
Algeciras	1–2	—	0–0	0–1	2–0	0–1	2–2	2–2	3–0	2–0	1–2	0–1	0–0	0–1	0–1	1–1	2–2	0–1	0–3	1–1	2–1	2–1
Almería	2–1	2–2	—	1–2	2–3	1–1	1–0	3–1	0–1	3–0	1–3	1–0	3–2	1–1	3–1	1–2	2–2	0–0	2–1	0–0	0–2	1–2
Cádiz	1–1	2–1	2–1	—	2–1	0–0	0–0	1–1	2–1	4–1	1–2	0–3	0–1	2–0	2–1	1–0	3–1	3–3	0–1	4–1	2–0	2–2
Ciudad Murcia	0–1	2–0	1–1	2–2	—	1–2	1–3	2–0	1–2	3–1	1–1	0–0	3–1	0–2	2–2	2–1	1–1	1–1	3–2	2–3	2–2	0–1
Córdoba	0–0	2–0	0–1	1–0	1–1	—	1–0	1–0	0–0	1–2	1–3	1–1	0–1	0–0	1–0	2–3	1–2	1–0	4–1	1–1	2–2	1–2
Eibar	1–2	2–1	1–0	0–1	0–2	0–0	—	0–1	2–0	1–1	1–1	2–0	3–3	1–1	0–0	5–0	1–1	0–0	2–2	0–0	3–1	0–0
Elche	0–2	3–2	3–3	1–0	2–2	1–1	2–0	—	1–1	1–2	1–0	1–0	2–3	1–1	1–2	2–1	2–0	1–2	2–1	2–0	2–3	1–1
Getafe	0–0	3–0	1–1	3–2	2–2	1–0	2–1	3–1	—	3–0	3–1	0–0	2–1	2–1	1–1	3–1	0–0	1–1	0–2	1–0	2–0	0–0
Las Palmas	1–2	2–2	1–1	0–2	2–3	3–1	1–0	1–2	1–1	—	2–2	1–2	1–1	2–1	0–0	1–0	0–4	1–1	1–2	1–1	2–1	1–1
Leganés	0–0	3–2	0–0	0–1	0–0	0–1	1–2	2–0	0–0	0–2	—	0–0	2–1	0–2	0–0	1–1	0–2	0–0	1–3	0–0	1–0	3–3
Levante	0–0	3–1	2–1	2–1	0–0	2–2	1–0	1–1	1–1	2–0	1–0	—	1–0	4–0	2–0	3–1	0–0	2–1	2–1	1–0	2–1	0–1
Málaga B	2–1	0–0	2–2	1–3	2–0	2–2	1–0	1–1	1–1	0–1	0–0	1–5	—	0–2	0–0	2–1	0–0	2–2	0–0	2–2	1–3	5–2
Numancia	3–1	0–1	0–0	2–0	7–0	1–0	2–3	2–0	0–0	2–0	3–0	3–1	3–0	—	1–0	1–0	2–0	0–0	1–1	2–1	2–0	0–0
Poli Ejido	1–3	0–0	1–2	1–0	0–1	1–1	0–0	1–2	0–0	1–0	2–1	1–0	1–2	1–3	—	1–0	2–0	1–3	0–0	1–0	2–1	1–0
Rayo	1–2	2–2	1–1	2–0	2–0	2–0	0–1	1–2	1–2	1–2	0–0	0–2	2–1	2–5	3–1	—	1–2	1–1	2–1	1–1	1–0	2–1
Recreativo	0–0	1–0	1–0	1–0	1–1	0–2	1–0	3–0	2–0	2–2	3–1	0–0	0–0	2–0	1–0	0–0	—	3–1	1–1	0–0	1–2	0–0
Salamanca	3–1	1–0	0–0	0–0	1–2	3–0	1–2	3–0	0–1	2–0	3–1	0–1	1–1	1–0	0–0	1–1	1–1	—	0–2	2–2	2–3	2–2
Sporting	2–0	3–2	2–0	2–0	4–1	1–1	1–0	2–0	0–2	1–1	1–1	1–2	1–0	1–0	1–0	3–1	0–0	1–1	—	0–2	1–0	3–0
Tenerife	1–0	0–0	2–0	2–2	1–1	1–0	1–1	2–1	3–5	2–0	0–0	1–1	0–1	1–0	0–1	2–1	2–1	1–1	0–1	—	0–0	2–1
Terrassa	0–0	0–0	0–0	1–0	0–0	1–0	2–1	1–1	1–2	2–2	0–1	4–4	0–1	0–1	2–0	1–2	2–2	1–1	1–0	1–1	—	1–1
Xerez	1–2	2–1	0–1	1–1	2–1	0–0	1–1	2–1	1–2	4–4	1–1	1–2	2–1	0–1	1–0	0–0	1–0	3–0	2–1	0–0	0–1	—

Source: BDFutbol
Legend: Blue = home team win; Yellow = draw; Red = away team win.
