= Estadio Insular =

Multi-use stadium in Las Palmas, Canary Islands, Spain

Coordinates: 28°07′44.32″N 15°26′01.73″W

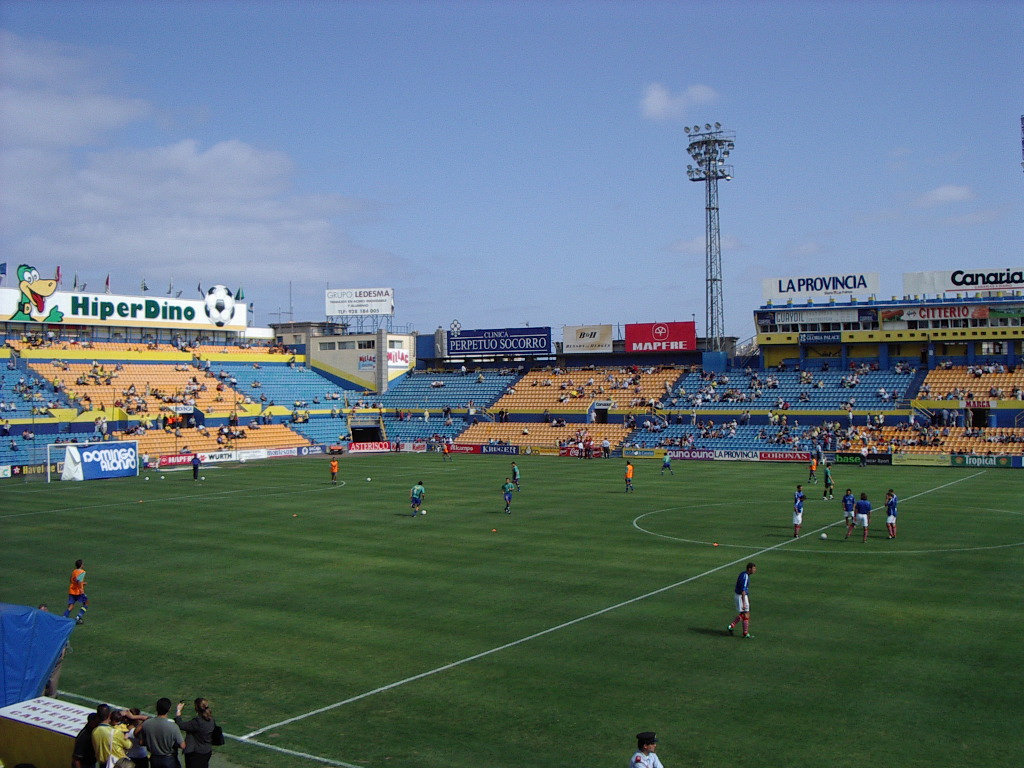
- Interactive map of Estadio Insular
- Full name: Estadio Insular
- Location: Las Palmas, Spain
- Owner: Cabildo de Gran Canaria
- Operator: UD Las Palmas
- Capacity: 21,000

Construction
- Opened: 25 December 1944
- Closed: 2003
- Demolished: 2014

Tenant
- UD Las Palmas

Estadio Insular was a multi-use public stadium in Las Palmas, Gran Canaria, Spain. It was opened in 1944 as the home of Marino and became the home UD Las Palmas upon the club's formation in 1949. The stadium hosted the Spain national football team four times between 1972 and 1996.

In 2003, the stadium closed after Las Palmas moved into the newly constructed Estadio Gran Canaria. It was partially demolished in 2014 and opened to the public in 2016.

== History ==
The stadium was designed by architect Fernando Delgado and built for Marino in 1944. It became home to UD Las Palmas when Marino merged with CD Gran Canaria, Atlético Club Las Palmas, Real Club Victoria and Arenas Club to form the new team. In 1951, it was bought and expanded by the Cabildo de Gran Canaria (the island council).

In 2003, the Gran Canaria Stadium opened, replacing Estadio Insular as the home of Las Palmas.

For 11 years, the stadium sat empty and fell into a state of disrepair. In 2014, it was partially demolished before it was redeveloped and opened to the public in 2016.

== International matches ==
The Spain national football team played four matches at Estadio Insular. The first was a qualifier for the 1974 FIFA World Cup against Yugoslavia on 19 October 1972. The match finished as a 2–2 draw and was the only competitive match played by Spain at the stadium. Three further friendly matches were played by Spain at the stadium – a 2–0 win against the Soviet Union in 1986, a 1–1 draw against Mexico in 1993 and a 1–0 win against Norway in 1996.
