= Gran Canaria Stadium =

Football stadium in Las Palmas, Canary Islands, Spain

Estadio de Gran Canaria
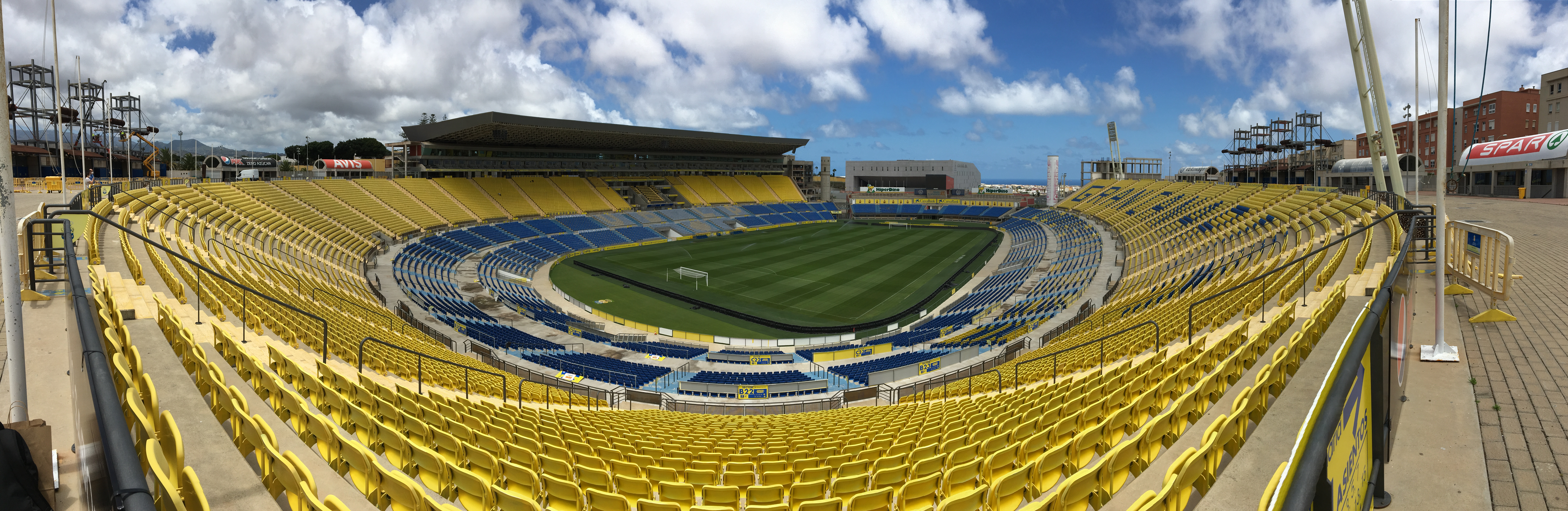
- Panoramic view of the stadium
- Interactive map of Estadio de Gran Canaria
- Location: Las Palmas, Spain
- Coordinates: 28°06′01″N 15°27′24″W
- Owner: Cabildo de Gran Canaria
- Operator: Cabildo de Gran Canaria
- Capacity: 32,392
- Record attendance: 32,037 (Las Palmas vs Real Madrid, 27 January 2024)
- Field size: 105 metres (115 yd) x 68 metres (74 yd)

Construction
- Opened: 8 May 2003
- Expanded: 2014–2016
- Architects: Pedro Medina; Guillermo Ortego Carretero

Tenants
- UD Las Palmas (2003–present); Spain national football team (selected matches)

Estadio de Gran Canaria is a football stadium in Las Palmas, Canary Islands, Spain. It is currently used for football matches and is home to UD Las Palmas. It was opened in 2003 as a multi-purpose stadium to become the successor of the old Estadio Insular.

It was confirmed in July 2024 that the stadium will host matches in the 2030 FIFA World Cup.

== History ==
The stadium was inaugurated on 8 May 2003 with a friendly between UD Las Palmas and Anderlecht which was played in front of a full-capacity seats. The match ended 2–1 in favour of Las Palmas. The first scorer in the stadium was Rubén Castro.

With a capacity of 32,400 seats, it is the 14th-largest stadium in Spain and the largest in the Canary Islands by terms of capacity (Although not the largest in terms of surface area of the pitch is concerned).

From 11 November 2014, the stadium went under restructuring works which lasted for 16 months. After the remodelization, the running track was removed to turn the venue into a football-specific stadium, with the seats closer to the playing ground.

The Island Government has approved funds to upgrade the stadium as it prepares to host matches for the FIFA World Cup in 2030 to over 40,000. The upgrades would cost €174.71m and take 36 months to complete, with the goal to finish by July 2029. The new features would include a new wraparound grandstand and a lightweight roof that would control humidity, collect rainwater, and power the stadium with solar energy.

== International matches ==
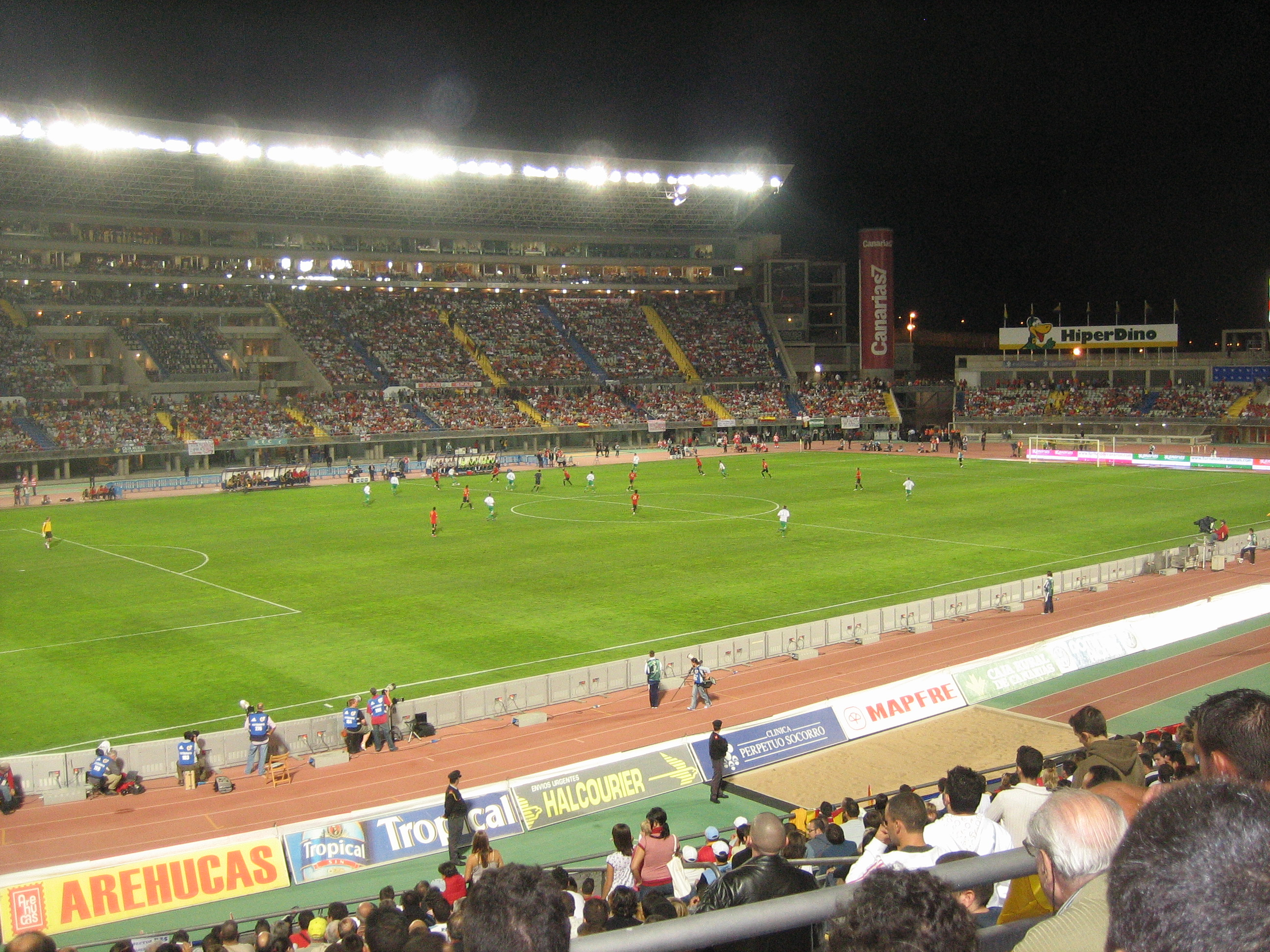
Spain v Northern Ireland, 2007

=== Spain national team matches ===
Date	Opponent	Score	Competition
18 August 2004	Venezuela	3–2	Friendly match
21 November 2007	Northern Ireland	1–0	UEFA Euro 2008 qualifying
18 November 2018	Bosnia and Herzegovina	1–0	Friendly match

== Average attendances ==
Tenants	League season	Tier	Home games	Average attendance
UD Las Palmas	2023-24	1st	19	25,041
UD Las Palmas	2022-23	2nd	21	20,643
UD Las Palmas	2018-19	2nd	21	12,203
UD Las Palmas	2017-18	1st	19	16,156
UD Las Palmas	2016-17	1st	19	20,429
UD Las Palmas	2015-16	1st	19	21,304
UD Las Palmas	2014-15	2nd	21	15,149
UD Las Palmas	2013-14	2nd	21	11,147
UD Las Palmas	2012-13	2nd	21	12,026

== See also ==
- Estadio Insular
