= List of Deportivo de A Coruña managers =

Football manager list

This is a list of managers of Deportivo de A Coruña, a Spanish professional football club based in the city of A Coruña, Galicia.

== Managers ==
Name	Nationality	Seasons
Unknown		1906–27
Félix Gila	Spain	1927–28
Ferenc Woggenhuber	Hungary	1928–29
Félix Gila	Spain	1929–33
José Planas	Spain	1933–34
Fernando Fariña	Spain	1933–34
José Torres	Spain	1933–36
Hilario	Spain	1939–41
Celso Mariño	Spain	1941–42
Chacho	Spain	1941–43
Ramón de la Fuente	Spain	1943–45
Hilario	Spain	1945–46
Juan Aurre Pérez	Spain	1946–47
Luis Urquiri	Spain	1947–48
Sabino Anfonegui	Spain	1948–49
José Torres	Spain	1948–49
Alejandro Scopelli	Argentina	1949–50
Jerónimo "Oso" Díaz	Spain	1950–51
Chacho	Spain	1951–52
Fernando Fariña	Spain	1952–53
Francisco Casal	Spain	1952–53
Helenio Herrera	Argentina-France	1952–53
Eduardo Toba	Spain	1952–53
Carlos Iturraspe	Spain	1953–54
Eduardo Toba	Spain	1954–55
Rodrigo García Vizoso	Spain	1955–56
Ángel Zubieta	Spain	1955–57
Diego Villalonga	Spain	1956–57
Roberto Rodríguez	Spain	1957–58
Carlos Iturraspe	Spain	1957–58
Ernesto Pons	Spain	1958–59
Hilario	Spain	1958–59
Jesús Barrio	Spain	1959–61
Juan Otxoantezana	Spain	1961–62
Enrique Rabassa	Spain	1962–63
Rogelio Santiago	Spain	1962–63
Roque Olsen	Argentina-Spain	1963–64
Luis Carniglia	Argentina	1964–65
Juan Otxoantezana	Spain	1964–65
Rodrigo García Vizoso	Spain	1964–65
Enrique Orizaola	Spain	1965–67
Dagoberto Moll	Uruguay	1966–67
Pedro Eguiluz	Spain	1967–68
Cheché Martín	Spain	1968–69
Roque Olsen	Argentina-Spain	1970–71
Arsenio Iglesias	Spain	1970–73
Fernando Riera	Chile	1973–74
Carlos Torres Barallobre	Spain	1973–74
Enrique Orizaola	Spain	1973–74
José Antonio Irulegui	Spain	1974–75
José Antonio Naya	Spain	1975–76
Cheché Martín	Spain	1975–76
Héctor Rial	Argentina-Spain	1976–77
Cheché Martín	Spain	1976–77
José Mª Sertucha	Spain	1976–77
José López	Spain	1976–77
Juan Arza	Spain	1977–78
Enrique Mateos	Spain	1978–79
Luis Suárez	Spain	1978–79
Francisco García-Verdugo	Spain	1979–80
Joseíto	Spain	1979–80
Pepe Martínez	Spain	1980–82
Luis Rodríguez Vaz	Spain	1981–82
Arsenio Iglesias	Spain	1982–85
Jesús Aranguren	Spain	1985–86
Eusebio Ríos	Spain	1986–88
Arsenio Iglesias	Spain	1988–89
Marco Antonio Boronat	Spain	1989–90
Arsenio Iglesias	Spain	1990–91
Marco Antonio Boronat	Spain	1991–92
Arsenio Iglesias	Spain	1991–95
John Toshack	Wales	July 1995 – June 97
Carlos Alberto Silva	Brazil	1996–98
José Manuel Corral	Spain	1997–98
Javier Irureta	Spain	July 1998 – June 5
Joaquín Caparrós	Spain	July 2005 – June 7
Miguel Ángel Lotina	Spain	July 2007 – June 2011
José Luis Oltra	Spain	July 2011 – 30 Dec 2012
Domingos Paciência	Portugal	30 Dec 2012 – 10 Feb 2013
Fernando Vázquez	Spain	11 Feb 2013 – 8 Jul 2014
Víctor Fernández	Spain	10 Jul 2014 – 8 Apr 2015
Víctor Sánchez	Spain	9 Apr 2015 – 30 May 2016
Gaizka Garitano	Spain	1 Jul 2016 – 26 Feb 2017
Pepe Mel	Spain	28 Feb 2017 – 23 Oct 2017
Cristóbal Parralo	Spain	24 Oct 2017 – 3 Feb 2018
Clarence Seedorf	Netherlands	5 Feb 2018 – 30 Jun 2018
Natxo González	Spain	1 Jul 2018 – 7 Apr 2019
José Luis Martí	Spain	8 Apr 2019 – 30 Jun 2019
Juan Antonio Anquela	Spain	2 July 2019 – 6 Oct 2019
Luis César Sampedro	Spain	7 Oct 2019 – 27 Dec 2019
Fernando Vázquez	Spain	29 Dec 2019 – 11 Jan 2021
Rubén de la Barrera	Spain	12 Jan 2021 – 30 Jun 2021
Borja Jiménez	Spain	30 Jun 2021 - 11 Oct 2022
Óscar Cano	Spain	11 Oct 2022 - 15 May 2023
Rubén de la Barrera	Spain	16 May 2023 - 14 June 2023
Imanol Idiakez	Spain	1 July 2023 - 28 October 2024
Óscar Gilsanz	Spain	5 November 2024 - 9 June 2025
Antonio Hidalgo	Spain	10 June 2025 - Present
