= Roberto Ríos =

Spanish footballer and coach

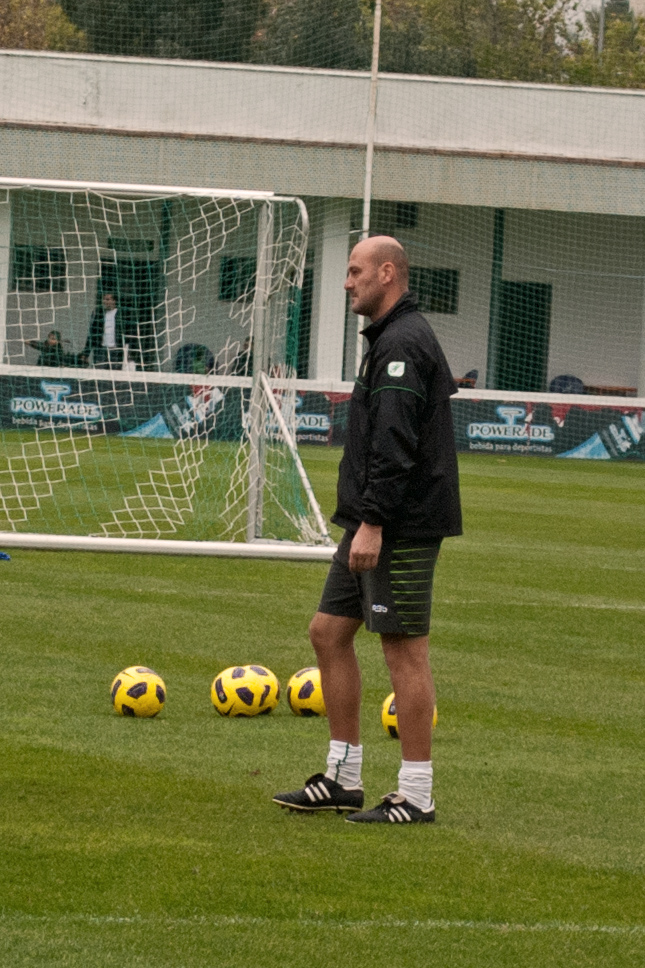
- Ríos training with Betis in 2010

Personal information
- Full name: Roberto Ríos Patus
- Date of birth: 8 October 1971 (age 55)
- Place of birth: Bilbao, Spain
- Height: 1.93 m (6 ft 4 in)
- Position: Centre-back

Youth career
- 1986–1990: Betis

Senior career*
Years	Team	Apps	(Gls)
1990–1992	Betis B	24	(3)
1992–1997	Betis	114	(11)
1997–2002	Athletic Bilbao	78	(4)
Total		216	(18)

International career
1991	Spain U19	2	(0)
1993–1994	Spain U21	2	(0)
1996–1998	Spain	11	(0)
1996–1997	Basque Country	4	(0)

Managerial career
- 2010–2013: Betis (assistant)
- 2014: West Bromwich Albion (assistant)
- 2014–2016: Betis (assistant)
- 2017: Deportivo La Coruña (assistant)
- 2019–2020: Las Palmas (assistant)
Medal record
Men's football
Representing Spain
UEFA European Under-21 Championship
Bronze medal – third place	1994 France
- * Club domestic league appearances and goals

Roberto Ríos Patus (born 8 October 1971) is a Spanish former professional footballer who played as a central defender.

== Club career ==
Although Basque-born (in Bilbao), Ríos emerged through the youth system of Real Betis, making his professional debut in the Segunda División in the 1992–93 season. He went on to contribute importantly in the Andalusians' promotion the following year – although appearing in only 19 matches, he scored four times – and become a regular first-team member onwards.

In summer 1997, following rumours of a transfer to Manchester United earlier in February, Ríos was signed by Athletic Bilbao for 2 billion pesetas, a then-record for a national player. In his first season, he netted twice in 32 games (including once in a 5–1 home win over CP Mérida, on 21 December 1997) as the Basque side finished runners-up in La Liga.

After spending the first months of the 2002–03 campaign without a club and having totalled only 27 appearances in his last three years at Athletic, Ríos trained with West Bromwich Albion. However, in January 2003 he rejected a contract offer from the Gary Megson-led team, stating "I don't want to fool anyone" about his chances of regaining full fitness.

Ríos retired aged 30, due to persistent injury problems. He returned to Betis in 2010, as part of newly appointed manager Pepe Mel's coaching staff.

== International career ==
Ríos was capped 11 times by Spain, with his debut coming on 9 October 1996 in a 0–0 away draw against the Czech Republic in the 1998 FIFA World Cup qualifiers. In spite of having appeared significantly during the campaign and coming from a solid club season with Athletic, he was overlooked for the final stages in France.

== Personal life ==
Ríos' father, Eusebio, was also a footballer and a defender. He too played mostly for Betis, and later managed the club.

== Honours ==
Spain U21

- UEFA European Championship third place: 1994
