= 1998–99 CD Ourense season =

CD Ourense
1998–99 season
- Head coach: Emilio Cruz (until 28 November); Perfecto Rodríguez Pérez (interim, 5 December); Luis Rodríguez Vaz (until 21 February); Juan Luis Hernández (from 28 February)
- Stadium: Estadio de O Couto
- Segunda División: 22nd (relegated)
- Copa del Rey: Second round
- Top goalscorer: League: Jon Kortina (6); All: Jon Kortina (7)
- Biggest win: 4–1 against Las Palmas
- Biggest defeat: 6–0 against Las Palmas

The 1998–99 season was the 47th season in the history of CD Ourense and their third consecutive season in the second division. The club participated in the Segunda División and the Copa del Rey. The season covered the period from 1 July 1998 to 30 June 1999.

== Competitions ==
=== Overall record ===
Competition	First match	Last match	Starting round	Final position	Record							
Competition	First match	Last match	Starting round	Final position	Pld	W	D	L	GF	GA	GD	Win %
Segunda División	30 August 1998	19 June 1999	Matchday 1	22nd	42	7	6	29	35	82	−47	16.67
Copa del Rey	2 September 1998	7 October 1998	First round	Second round	4	1	3	0	3	1	+2	25.00
Total					46	8	9	29	38	83	−45	17.39

Source: Competitions

==== League table ====
Pos	Team	Pld	W	D	L	GF	GA	GD	Pts	Promotion, qualification or relegation
18	Eibar	42	13	8	21	42	56	−14	47	
19	Mallorca B (R)	42	12	10	20	52	64	−12	46	Relegation to Segunda División B
20	Barcelona B (R)	42	13	5	24	51	68	−17	44	Relegation to Segunda División B
21	Hércules (R)	42	10	10	22	38	66	−28	40	Relegation to Segunda División B
22	Ourense (R)	42	7	6	29	35	82	−47	27	Relegation to Segunda División B

Rules for classification: 1st points; 2nd head-to-head points; 3rd head-to-head goal difference; 4th head-to-head goals scored; 5th goal difference; 6th number of goals scored; 7th Fair-play points
(R) Relegated

==== Results summary ====
Overall								Home						Away					
Pld	W	D	L	GF	GA	GD	Pts	W	D	L	GF	GA	GD	W	D	L	GF	GA	GD
42	7	6	29	35	82	−47	27	6	3	12	24	33	−9	1	3	17	11	49	−38

Source: Segunda División

==== Results by round ====
Round	1	2	3	4	5	6	7	8	9	10	11	12	13	14	15	16	17	18	19	20	21	22	23	24	25	26	27	28	29	30	31	32	33	34	35	36	37	38	39	40	41	42
Ground	A	H	H	A	H	A	H	A	H	A	H	A	H	A	H	A	H	A	H	A	H	H	A	A	H	A	H	A	H	A	H	A	H	A	H	A	H	A	H	A	H	A
Result	L	L	W	D	W	L	L	W	W	L	L	L	L	L	L	L	L	D	D	L	L	L	D	L	L	L	D	L	L	L	D	L	W	L	W	L	L	L	W	L	L	L
Position	22	22	13	12	10	14	14	13	10	14	15	15	18	19	20	21	21	20	20	21	21	21	21	22	22	22	22	22	22	22	22	22	22	22	22	22	22	22	22	22	22	22

Source: Segunda División
A = Away; H = Home; W = Win; D = Draw; L = Loss

==== Matches ====
30 August 1998 1	Sevilla	3–0	Ourense	Seville
--:-- CEST (UTC+2)				Stadium: Ramón Sánchez Pizjuán

5 September 1998 2	Ourense	0–1	Málaga	Ourense
--:-- CEST (UTC+2)				Stadium: Estadio de O Couto

13 September 1998 3	Ourense	1–0	Recreativo	Ourense
--:-- CEST (UTC+2)				Stadium: Estadio de O Couto

20 September 1998 4	Mérida	1–1	Ourense	Mérida
--:-- CEST (UTC+2)				Stadium: Romano

27 September 1998 5	Ourense	1–0	Leganés	Ourense
--:-- CEST (UTC+2)				Stadium: Estadio de O Couto

4 October 1998 6	Badajoz	2–0	Ourense	Badajoz
--:-- CEST (UTC+2)				Stadium: Nuevo Vivero

11 October 1998 7	Ourense	1–4	Osasuna	Ourense
--:-- CEST (UTC+2)				Stadium: Estadio de O Couto

18 October 1998 8	Hércules	0–2	Ourense	Alicante
--:-- CEST (UTC+2)				Stadium: José Rico Pérez

24 October 1998 9	Ourense	2–0	Barcelona B	Ourense
--:-- CEST (UTC+2)				Stadium: Estadio de O Couto

31 October 1998 10	Albacete	2–1	Ourense	Albacete
--:-- CEST (UTC+2)				Stadium: Carlos Belmonte

8 November 1998 11	Ourense	0–1	Toledo	Ourense
--:-- CET (UTC+1)				Stadium: Estadio de O Couto

14 November 1998 12	Eibar	2–1	Ourense	Eibar
--:-- CET (UTC+1)				Stadium: Ipurua

22 November 1998 13	Ourense	1–2	Sporting Gijón	Ourense
--:-- CET (UTC+1)				Stadium: Estadio de O Couto

28 November 1998 14	Las Palmas	6–0	Ourense	Las Palmas
--:-- CET (UTC+1)				Stadium: Insular

5 December 1998 15	Ourense	1–2	Mallorca B	Ourense
--:-- CET (UTC+1)				Stadium: Estadio de O Couto

13 December 1998 16	Atlético Madrid B	2–1	Ourense	Madrid
--:-- CET (UTC+1)				Stadium: Cerro del Espino

20 December 1998 17	Ourense	1–2	Rayo Vallecano	Ourense
--:-- CET (UTC+1)				Stadium: Estadio de O Couto

3 January 1999 18	Logroñés	2–2	Ourense	Logroño
--:-- CET (UTC+1)				Stadium: Las Gaunas

9 January 1999 19	Ourense	1–1	Lleida	Ourense
--:-- CET (UTC+1)				Stadium: Estadio de O Couto

17 January 1999 20	Numancia	4–0	Ourense	Soria
--:-- CET (UTC+1)				Stadium: Municipal Los Pajaritos

23 January 1999 21	Ourense	0–2	Compostela	Ourense
--:-- CET (UTC+1)				Stadium: Estadio de O Couto

31 January 1999 22	Ourense	2–3	Sevilla	Ourense
--:-- CET (UTC+1)				Stadium: Estadio de O Couto

7 February 1999 23	Málaga	1–1	Ourense	Málaga
--:-- CET (UTC+1)				Stadium: La Rosaleda

14 February 1999 24	Recreativo	2–0	Ourense	Huelva
--:-- CET (UTC+1)				Stadium: Nuevo Colombino

21 February 1999 25	Ourense	0–1	Mérida	Ourense
--:-- CET (UTC+1)				Stadium: Estadio de O Couto

28 February 1999 26	Leganés	3–0	Ourense	Leganés
--:-- CET (UTC+1)				Stadium: Butarque

7 March 1999 27	Ourense	1–1	Badajoz	Ourense
--:-- CET (UTC+1)				Stadium: Estadio de O Couto

14 March 1999 28	Osasuna	2–1	Ourense	Pamplona
--:-- CET (UTC+1)				Stadium: El Sadar

27 March 1999 30	Barcelona B	5–0	Ourense	Mini Estadi
--:-- CET (UTC+1)				Stadium: Barcelona

4 April 1999 31	Ourense	2–2	Albacete	Ourense
--:-- CEST (UTC+2)				Stadium: Estadio de O Couto

11 April 1999 32	Toledo	2–0	Ourense	Toledo
--:-- CEST (UTC+2)				Stadium: Salto del Caballo

18 April 1999 33	Ourense	4–2	Eibar	Ourense
--:-- CEST (UTC+2)				Stadium: Estadio de O Couto

25 April 1999 34	Sporting Gijón	1–0	Ourense	Gijón
--:-- CEST (UTC+2)				Stadium: El Molinón

1 May 1999 35	Ourense	4–1	Las Palmas	Ourense
--:-- CEST (UTC+2)				Stadium: Estadio de O Couto

10 May 1999 36	Mallorca B	2–0	Ourense	Palma
--:-- CEST (UTC+2)				Stadium: Lluís Sitjar

16 May 1999 37	Ourense	0–4	Atlético Madrid B	Ourense
--:-- CEST (UTC+2)				Stadium: Estadio de O Couto

23 May 1999 38	Rayo Vallecano	2–0	Ourense	Madrid
--:-- CEST (UTC+2)				Stadium: Vallecas

30 May 1999 39	Ourense	1–0	Logroñés	Ourense
--:-- CEST (UTC+2)				Stadium: Estadio de O Couto

6 June 1999 40	Lleida	2–1	Ourense	Lleida
--:-- CEST (UTC+2)				Stadium: Camp d'Esports

12 June 1999 41	Ourense	0–2	Numancia	Ourense
--:-- CEST (UTC+2)				Stadium: Estadio de O Couto

19 June 1999 42	Compostela	3–0	Ourense	Santiago de Compostela
--:-- CEST (UTC+2)				Stadium: San Lázaro

=== Copa del Rey ===
==== First round ====
2 September 1998 First leg	Calahorra	1–1	Ourense	Calahorra
--:-- CEST (UTC+2)				Stadium: La Planilla

9 September 1998 Second leg	Ourense	2–0 (3–1 agg.)	Calahorra	Ourense
--:-- CEST (UTC+2)				Stadium: Estadio de O Couto

==== Second round ====
24 September 1998 First leg	Ourense	0–0	Sporting Gijón	Ourense
--:-- CEST (UTC+2)				Stadium: Estadio de O Couto

7 October 1998 Second leg	Sporting Gijón	0–0 (a.e.t.) (4–3 p)	Ourense	Gijón
--:-- CEST (UTC+2)				Stadium: El Molinón; Referee: Navas Lasa
