= 1991–92 Deportivo de La Coruña season =

1991–92 sports season

Deportivo de La Coruña
- President: Augusto César Lendoiro
- Head coach: Marco Antonio Boronat; Arsenio Iglesias
- Stadium: Riazor
- La Liga: 17th
- Copa del Rey: Semi-finals

During the 1991–92 season, Deportivo de La Coruña competed in La Liga and the Copa del Rey. The club finished 17th and won the play-off to remain in the top division next season.

== Competitions ==
Win Draw Loss

=== Overall record ===
Competition	First match	Last match	Starting round	Final position	Record							
Competition	First match	Last match	Starting round	Final position	Pld	W	D	L	GF	GA	GD	Win %
La Liga	31 August 1991	7 June 1992	Matchday 1	17th	39	9	15	15	37	48	−11	23.08
Copa del Rey	30 October 1991		Round of 64	Semi-finals	10	6	2	2	16	10	+6	60.00
Total					49	15	17	17	53	58	−5	30.61

Source: Competitions

=== La Liga ===
==== League table ====
Pos	Team	Pld	W	D	L	GF	GA	GD	Pts	Qualification or relegation
15	Osasuna	38	10	13	15	30	40	−10	33	
16	Español	38	12	8	18	43	60	−17	32	
17	Deportivo La Coruña (O)	38	8	15	15	37	48	−11	31	Qualification for the relegation playoffs
18	Cádiz (O)	38	7	14	17	32	55	−23	28	Qualification for the relegation playoffs
19	Valladolid (R)	38	7	13	18	31	53	−22	27	Relegation to the Segunda División

Source: BDFútbol
Rules for classification: 1) Points; 2) Head-to-head results; 3) Goal difference; 4) Number of goals scored
(O) Play-off winners; (R) Relegated

==== Results summary ====
Overall								Home						Away					
Pld	W	D	L	GF	GA	GD	Pts	W	D	L	GF	GA	GD	W	D	L	GF	GA	GD
38	8	15	15	37	48	−11	39	5	11	3	24	22	+2	3	4	12	13	26	−13

Source: La Liga

==== Results by round ====
Round	1	2	3	4	5	6	7	8	9	10	11	12	13	14	15	16	17	18	19	20	21	22	23	24	25	26	27	28	29	30	31	32	33	34	35	36	37	38
Ground	A	H	A	H	A	H	A	H	A	H	H	A	H	A	H	A	H	A	H	A	A	H	A	H	A	H	A	H	A	A	H	A	H	A	H	A	H	A
Result	L	D	L	W	D	W	L	L	L	L	D	D	W	W	D	L	D	W	D	L	L	D	L	D	D	W	L	D	L	L	D	L	D	D	W	L	D	W
Position	13	14	15	15	11	9	12	14	17	18	19	18	16	13	12	14	13	12	12	13	14	14	15	15	16	13	15	15	16	17	16	17	17	17	17	17	17	17

Source: La Liga
A = Away; H = Home; W = Win; D = Draw; L = Loss

==== Matches ====
31 August 1991 1	Valencia	2–1	Deportivo La Coruña	Valencia
				Stadium: Mestalla

8 September 1991 2	Deportivo La Coruña	1–1	Tenerife	A Coruña
				Stadium: Riazor

15 September 1991 3	Cádiz	1–0	Deportivo La Coruña	Cádiz
				Stadium: Ramón de Carranza

29 September 1991 4	Deportivo La Coruña	1–0	Valladolid	A Coruña
				Stadium: Riazor

6 October 1991 5	Athletic Bilbao	0–0	Deportivo La Coruña	Bilbao
				Stadium: San Mamés

20 October 1991 6	Deportivo La Coruña	3–1	Sevilla	A Coruña
				Stadium: Riazor

27 October 1991 7	Sporting Gijón	1–0	Deportivo La Coruña	Gijón
				Stadium: El Molinón

2 November 1991 8	Deportivo La Coruña	0–3	Real Madrid	A Coruña
				Stadium: Riazor

10 November 1991 9	Logroñés	2–1	Deportivo La Coruña	Logroño
				Stadium: Estadio Las Gaunas

17 November 1991 10	Deportivo La Coruña	0–4	Barcelona	A Coruña
				Stadium: Riazor

24 November 1991 11	Deportivo La Coruña	2–2	Albacete	A Coruña
				Stadium: Riazor

1 December 1991 12	Real Burgos	0–0	Deportivo La Coruña	Burgos
				Stadium: Estadio El Plantío

8 December 1991 13	Deportivo La Coruña	1–0	Mallorca	A Coruña
				Stadium: Riazor

15 December 1991 14	Español	0–3	Deportivo La Coruña	Barcelona

22 December 1991 15	Deportivo La Coruña	0–0	Real Sociedad	A Coruña
				Stadium: Riazor

5 January 1992 16	Zaragoza	1–0	Deportivo La Coruña	Zaragoza
				Stadium: La Romareda

12 January 1992 17	Deportivo La Coruña	0–0	Oviedo	A Coruña
				Stadium: Riazor
