= 1982–83 Segunda División =

52nd season of the second-tier football league in Spain

Segunda División
- Season: 1982–83
- Dates: 4 September 1982 - 22 May 1983
- Champions: Murcia (6th title)
- Promoted: Murcia; Cádiz; Mallorca
- Relegated: Alavés; Sabadell; Xerez; Córdoba
- Matches: 380
- Goals: 904 (2.38 per match)
- Top goalscorer: (Spain) José Luis Vara

The 1982–83 Segunda División season saw 20 teams participate in the second flight Spanish league. Real Murcia won the league.

Murcia, Cádiz CF and RCD Mallorca were promoted to Primera División. Deportivo Alavés, CE Sabadell FC, Xerez CD and Córdoba CF were relegated to Segunda División B.

Location of teams in Segunda División 1982-83

== Team locations and managers ==
Club	Town	Stadium	Manager
Alavés	Vitoria	Mendizorrotza	(Spain) Luis María Astorga
Atlético Madrileño	Madrid	Vicente Calderón	(Spain) Joaquín Peiró
Barcelona Atlètic	Barcelona	Mini Estadi	(Spain) Antoni Torres
Cádiz	Cádiz	Ramón de Carranza	(Socialist Federal Republic of Yugoslavia) Dragoljub Milošević
Cartagena	Cartagena	El Almarjal	(Spain) José Víctor Rodríguez
Castellón	Castellón de la Plana	Castàlia	(Spain) José Antonio Naya Mella
Castilla	Madrid	Ciudad Deportiva	(Spain) Amancio Amaro
Córdoba	Córdoba	El Arcángel	(Spain) Gonzalo Uceda
Deportivo La Coruña	A Coruña	Riazor	(Spain) Arsenio Iglesias
Elche	Elche	Nuevo Estadio	(Paraguay) Cayetano Ré
Hércules	Alicante	José Rico Pérez	(Spain) Pachín
Linares	Linares	Linarejos	(Spain) Nando Yosu
Mallorca	Palma de Mallorca	Lluís Sitjar	(France) Lucien Muller
Murcia	Murcia	La Condomina	(Spain) Eusebio Ríos
Oviedo	Oviedo	Carlos Tartiere	(Spain) José María
Palencia	Palencia	La Balastera	(Spain) Luis Costa
Rayo Vallecano	Madrid	Nuevo Estadio	(Spain) Juan José García Santos
Recreativo Huelva	Huelva	Colombino	(Spain) Jesús Aranguren
Sabadell	Sabadell	Nova Creu Alta	(Spain) Julià García Jané
Xerez	Jerez de la Frontera	Domecq	(Spain) Enrique Alés

== League table ==
Pos	Team	Pld	W	D	L	GF	GA	GD	Pts	Promotion or relegation
1	Real Murcia	38	22	10	6	68	30	+38	54	Promoted to Primera División
2	Cádiz CF	38	18	11	9	56	37	+19	47	Promoted to Primera División
3	RCD Mallorca	38	17	12	9	54	37	+17	46	Promoted to Primera División
4	Deportivo de La Coruña	38	19	8	11	58	36	+22	46	
5	Palencia CF	38	17	9	12	42	34	+8	43	
6	Castilla CF	38	15	11	12	45	43	+2	41	
7	Elche CF	38	14	13	11	51	38	+13	41	
8	Hércules CF	38	13	14	11	44	41	+3	40	
9	Rayo Vallecano	38	15	9	14	53	50	+3	39	
10	Recreativo de Huelva	38	12	15	11	46	50	−4	39	
11	Barcelona Atlètic	38	12	14	12	46	40	+6	38	
12	Real Oviedo	38	12	12	14	35	45	−10	36	
13	Atlético Madrileño	38	13	10	15	44	44	0	36	
14	Linares CF	38	11	14	13	28	41	−13	36	
15	CD Castellón	38	11	13	14	45	60	−15	35	
16	Cartagena FC	38	10	14	14	40	46	−6	34	
17	Deportivo Alavés	38	8	16	14	40	54	−14	32	Relegated to Segunda División B
18	CE Sabadell FC	38	10	10	18	43	51	−8	30	Relegated to Segunda División B
19	Xerez CD	38	9	7	22	36	56	−20	25	Relegated to Segunda División B
20	Córdoba CF	38	6	10	22	30	71	−41	22	Relegated to Segunda División B

Source: BDFutbol

== Results ==
Home \ Away	ALV	ATM	BAR	CÁD	CAR	CAS	CST	CÓR	DEP	ELC	HÉR	LIN	MLL	MUR	OVI	PAL	RAY	REC	SAB	XER
Alavés	—	0–2	1–3	1–0	2–0	1–1	2–2	3–0	2–1	2–0	1–1	0–0	0–1	1–2	3–0	1–4	1–1	2–1	1–3	2–2
At. Madrileño	1–1	—	0–1	0–1	1–0	1–2	1–1	0–2	2–0	0–0	2–3	0–1	1–2	3–3	1–1	1–0	0–0	1–2	3–0	2–0
Barcelona At.	1–1	0–1	—	2–1	1–1	3–0	2–0	0–0	0–0	1–1	1–2	1–1	2–0	1–4	0–0	2–0	1–0	4–1	4–1	1–1
Cádiz	4–0	2–1	2–1	—	3–0	1–2	0–0	3–1	1–0	3–1	0–0	1–1	1–1	1–1	1–2	1–0	2–0	2–1	1–0	2–1
Cartagena	0–0	3–1	0–1	4–3	—	2–0	3–0	1–0	1–1	5–3	0–0	3–0	1–2	2–2	1–1	0–0	1–1	1–1	0–0	1–0
Castellón	0–0	1–2	1–0	1–5	2–2	—	0–1	3–3	1–1	2–2	2–2	2–1	2–1	2–1	1–0	2–0	0–0	0–0	2–0	2–0
Castilla	1–1	2–1	1–1	0–0	2–1	1–1	—	2–1	1–1	0–0	0–1	2–0	1–0	3–3	2–0	3–1	4–1	2–0	1–0	2–0
Córdoba	3–0	3–1	2–2	2–2	0–1	0–0	1–2	—	0–4	1–1	0–2	1–1	0–3	0–2	1–0	1–3	1–3	1–2	2–1	1–0
Deportivo	1–0	3–1	1–0	2–0	5–0	5–1	2–1	4–0	—	1–0	2–1	2–0	3–1	0–1	3–1	0–2	1–2	3–1	3–1	2–0
Elche	1–0	1–3	0–0	0–0	2–1	4–1	0–2	7–0	3–0	—	2–1	2–0	1–1	2–0	4–0	2–2	2–1	2–1	2–0	1–0
Hércules	2–2	0–0	1–1	1–2	2–1	0–0	0–2	1–1	2–0	1–0	—	2–0	1–0	1–0	3–0	1–1	3–2	1–2	2–1	1–1
Linares	2–2	1–2	0–0	1–1	1–1	2–0	1–0	1–0	0–0	1–0	2–1	—	0–0	1–3	2–1	2–0	0–0	1–2	0–0	2–0
Mallorca	2–2	1–2	2–1	1–2	2–0	3–2	3–0	2–0	3–0	1–1	0–0	2–0	—	0–0	3–0	1–0	2–1	2–2	1–1	3–0
Murcia	4–0	2–1	3–0	0–1	2–0	2–1	4–1	1–0	2–2	2–0	2–0	1–1	2–0	—	4–2	1–0	1–1	7–0	1–0	1–0
Oviedo	1–1	0–0	2–1	1–1	0–0	1–0	2–0	1–1	1–0	1–1	1–0	3–0	0–0	1–0	—	0–0	2–0	1–1	3–1	4–0
Palencia	1–1	1–1	2–1	0–2	1–0	1–1	1–0	4–0	1–0	1–0	2–0	0–1	0–0	1–0	4–0	—	1–0	0–0	2–0	4–2
Rayo	1–2	1–2	1–4	3–1	2–1	1–0	3–1	2–1	1–2	1–0	4–3	4–0	3–1	1–1	1–0	2–0	—	1–0	2–2	3–2
Recreativo	1–0	0–2	1–1	2–1	1–1	5–3	0–0	5–0	1–1	0–0	1–1	2–0	2–2	0–0	1–0	0–1	1–0	—	2–2	3–1
Sabadell	1–0	3–1	3–0	1–0	0–1	2–1	5–2	1–0	1–2	1–1	1–1	0–0	1–2	0–2	1–2	5–0	1–1	1–1	—	0–1
Xerez	3–1	0–0	2–1	2–2	1–0	1–2	3–1	0–0	0–0	1–2	2–0	0–1	2–3	0–1	2–0	0–1	3–2	2–0	1–2	—

Source: BDFutbol
Legend: Blue = home team win; Yellow = draw; Red = away team win.

== Top goalscorers ==
Rank	Player	Club	Goals
1	(Spain) José Luis	Deportivo La Coruña	16
2	(El Salvador) Mágico González	Cádiz	15
2	(Spain) José Mejías	Cádiz	15
2	(Paraguay) Felipe Nery	Elche	15
5	(Honduras) Roberto Figueroa	Murcia	14
5	(Spain) Jesús Crespo	Recreativo de Huelva	14
5	(Spain) Víctor	Atlético Madrileño	14
8	(Argentina) Rolando Barrera	Mallorca	13
8	(Spain) Emilio Butragueño	Castilla	13
10	(Spain) José Manuel Traba	Deportivo La Coruña	12
10	(Spain) Emiliano	Rayo Vallecano	12
10	(Spain) Paco Clos	Barcelona Atlètic	12
