= 1947–48 Segunda División =

17th season of the second-tier football league in Spain

Segunda División
- Season: 1947–48
- Champions: Valladolid
- Promoted: Valladolid; Deportivo La Coruña
- Relegated: Mallorca; Real Córdoba
- Matches: 182
- Goals: 789 (4.34 per match)
- Top goalscorer: José Serratusell (31 goals)
- Best goalkeeper: Juan Acuña (1.17 goals/match)
- Biggest home win: Ferrol 9–0 Murcia (22 February 1948)
- Biggest away win: Baracaldo 0–3 Valladolid (26 October 1947); Murcia 1–4 Ferrol (16 November 1947); Mestalla 1–4 Castellón (21 February 1948)
- Highest scoring: Málaga 8–3 Badalona (5 October 1947); Mestalla 6–5 Ferrol (1 November 1947); Málaga 9–2 Hércules (4 January 1948); Mestalla 8–3 Valladolid (6 March 1948)

The 1947–48 Segunda División season was the 17th since its establishment and was played between 21 September 1947 and 11 April 1948.

== Overview before the season ==
14 teams joined the league, including three relegated from the 1946–47 La Liga and three promoted from the 1946–47 Tercera División.

Relegated from La Liga

- Murcia
- Deportivo La Coruña
- Castellón

Promoted from Tercera División

- Mestalla
- Badalona
- Valladolid

== Teams ==
Location of teams in Segunda División 1947-48

Club	City	Stadium
CF Badalona	Badalona	Avenida de Navarra
Club Baracaldo	Baracaldo	Lasesarre
CD Castellón	Castellón de la Plana	Castalia
RCD Córdoba	Córdoba	El Arcángel
RC Deportivo La Coruña	La Coruña	Riazor
Club Ferrol	Ferrol	Inferniño
Granada CF	Granada	Los Cármenes
Hércules CF	Alicante	La Viña
Levante UD	Valencia	Vallejo
CD Málaga	Málaga	La Rosaleda
RCD Mallorca	Palma de Mallorca	Es Fortí
CD Mestalla	Valencia	Mestalla
Real Murcia	Murcia	Estadio de La Condomina
Real Valladolid Deportivo	Valladolid	José Zorrilla (1940)

== League table ==
Pos	Team	Pld	W	D	L	GF	GA	GD	Pts	Promotion or relegation
1	Valladolid (C, P)	26	15	6	5	60	43	+17	36	Promotion to La Liga
2	Deportivo La Coruña (P)	26	15	3	8	67	29	+38	33	Promotion to La Liga
3	Ferrol	26	13	2	11	66	44	+22	28 (Note: Ferrol finished ahead of Málaga on head-to-head points: Málaga–Ferrol 1–1, Ferrol–Málaga 3–1)	
4	Málaga	26	13	2	11	65	52	+13	28	
5	Levante	26	11	5	10	64	53	+11	27	
6	Hércules	26	12	2	12	68	63	+5	26	
7	Granada	26	10	4	12	48	58	−10	24 (Note: Granada finished ahead of Mestalla, Baracaldo and Badalona on head-to-head points: Granada 7 pts, Mestalla 6 pts, Baracaldo 6 pts, Badalona 5 pts. Mestalla finished ahead of Baracaldo on head-to-head goal difference: Baracaldo–Mestalla 3–2, Mestalla–Baracaldo 2–0)	
8	Mestalla	26	10	4	12	59	65	−6	24	
9	Baracaldo	26	12	0	14	52	67	−15	24	
10	Badalona	26	10	4	12	63	76	−13	24	
11	Murcia	26	9	5	12	43	59	−16	23 (Note: Murcia finished ahead of Castellón on head-to-head goal difference: Murcia–Castellón 4–1, Castellón–Murcia 2–1)	
12	Castellón	26	10	3	13	48	60	−12	23	
13	Mallorca (R)	26	9	4	13	44	65	−21	22 (Note: Mallorca finished ahead of Real Córdoba on head-to-head goal difference: Real Córdoba–Mallorca 2–0, Mallorca–Real Córdoba 5–1)	Relegation to Tercera División
14	Real Córdoba (R)	26	9	4	13	42	55	−13	22	Relegation to Tercera División

Source: BDFútbol
Rules for classification: 1) points; 2) head-to-head points; 3) head-to-head goal difference; 4) goal difference; 5) number of goals scored
(C) Champions; (P) Promoted; (R) Relegated

== Results ==
Home \ Away	BAD	BAR	CAS	DEP	GRA	HER	LEV	CDM	MAL	MES	MUR	COR	RFE	VLL
Badalona	—	2–0	4–1	6–1	3–3	1–3	2–2	3–2	3–1	7–3	3–2	5–2	4–0	2–2
Baracaldo	6–1	—	5–2	1–0	3–2	4–0	3–2	2–1	4–1	3–2	4–0	3–0	4–1	0–3
Castellón	3–0	5–0	—	0–1	4–0	5–2	4–2	0–2	2–0	2–2	2–1	2–1	2–0	1–1
Deportivo La Coruña	3–1	7–1	7–0	—	3–0	2–0	4–0	2–0	5–0	6–0	7–1	6–0	2–0	0–0
Granada	2–0	3–0	2–2	1–3	—	2–1	3–2	1–3	5–1	2–0	4–3	3–2	4–2	1–0
Hércules	3–0	6–2	5–2	2–1	5–2	—	2–2	3–0	5–2	4–0	5–0	0–2	3–2	6–2
Levante	3–3	5–1	2–0	3–0	5–2	4–1	—	4–1	8–0	1–0	3–3	4–2	5–3	3–0
Málaga	8–3	2–1	5–1	4–1	2–2	9–2	4–2	—	5–1	3–2	3–2	2–0	1–1	2–0
Mallorca	5–3	3–2	3–0	1–3	2–1	3–1	0–0	2–1	—	1–1	2–1	5–1	2–0	2–3
Mestalla	6–3	2–0	1–4	2–0	5–0	7–3	2–0	3–2	3–3	—	1–1	2–0	6–5	8–3
Murcia	0–1	4–1	4–1	1–1	2–1	2–1	3–0	3–0	2–1	2–0	—	2–0	1–4	0–0
Real Córdoba	5–0	5–1	3–1	1–1	1–1	3–2	2–1	3–2	2–0	3–1	0–0	—	1–3	1–3
Ferrol	3–1	4–0	3–0	2–0	3–1	2–1	5–0	3–1	1–1	6–0	9–0	3–0	—	1–2
Valladolid	7–2	4–1	4–2	2–1	1–0	2–2	3–1	5–0	3–2	1–0	5–3	2–2	2–0	—

Source: BDFútbol
Legend: Blue = home team win; Yellow = draw; Red = away team win.

== Top goalscorers ==
Goalscorers	Goals	Team
(Spain) José Serratusell	31	Badalona
(Spain) Pedro Bazán	29	Málaga
(Spain) Julián Vaquero	26	Valladolid
(Spain) José Caeiro	26	Ferrol
(Spain) Calsita	20	Hércules

== Top goalkeepers ==
Goalkeeper	Goals	Matches	Average	Team
(Spain) Juan Acuña	27	23	1.17	Deportivo La Coruña
(Spain) Juan Alonso	30	21	1.43	Ferrol
(Spain) Antonio Tapia	37	21	1.76	Valladolid
(Spain) Francisco Gómez	23	13	1.77	Murcia
(Spain) José Valero	21	11	1.91	Granada
