= Concurso España =

- Founded: 1912
- Abolished: 1913
- Region: Spain
- Most championships: Deportivo La Coruña (1 title)

The Concurso España (Note: Spanish pronunciation: [koŋˈkuɾso esˈpaɲa]; "Spain Competition") was a knockout football competition in Spanish football, organized by the Federación Española de Clubs de Foot-ball (FECF), a forerunner of the Royal Spanish Football Federation (RFEF). It was created as a competition where foreign players were allowed to play, after they had been banned from the Copa del Rey due to disputes that arose between the clubs during the 1911 tournament. Only a single edition was completed in 1912, which was won by Deportivo La Coruña. It was officially recognised by the board of directors of the RFEF on 25 March 2023.

In 1913, the Real Unión Española de Clubs de Foot-ball (RUECF), a split of the FECF, organized a similar tournament called Copa España (Note: Spanish pronunciation: [ˈkopa esˈpaɲa]; "Spain Cup") but the final round was not played.

== History ==
=== Ban of foreign players from Copa del Rey ===
During the course of the 1911 Copa del Rey a great controversy broke out concerning the alignment of foreign players. Deportivo La Coruña and Academia de Ingenieros withdrew before the draw to protest fielding foreign players in the tournament. During the tournament, there were more protests and withdrawal threats from some teams. After the first round match between Athletic Bilbao and Fortuna Vigo, Real Sociedad protested the match, claiming the illegal selection of two English players in Athletic's side: the FECF rejected the protest and Real Sociedad withdrew in protest. After the remaining teams supported Real Sociedad and most of them threatened to also withdraw, Athletic decided not to use these players in their matches, but declined Fortuna Vigo's request to replay their match. This dispute was a major factor in Athletic Bilbao's decision to select only local Basque players from then on, a club policy which survived into the 21st century.

For the 1912 Copa del Rey the FECF did not allow the alignment of foreign players. Specifically, in its 7th point of the tournament rules, it established that: "the players who make up the teams for this championship and their substitutes must be Spanish, considering as such those who are according to the Constitution of the Spanish State”.

=== FECF Concurso España (1912–13) ===
In May 1912, the FECF assembly decided to create a new tournament in which foreign players could participate. The idea was agreed six months earlier, as a compensation for not allowing them in the Copa del Rey. The competition was called Concurso España and it was projected to be played every year. Any club affiliated to the FECF could register, but finally teams from outside Galicia did not attend and only Deportivo La Coruña, Vigo FC and Pontevedra Sporting Club registered, the latter withdrawing before the tournament was held, thus leaving the competition in a head-to-head between Deportivo and Vigo. The final match started in A Coruña on 7 September 1912. When the result was 4–3 in favor of Deportivo and left a few minutes to the final whistle, the match was suspended due to lack of light. The remaining minutes were played the following day. The match ended without modifications to the score, making Deportivo La Coruña win the tournament. This was followed by a friendly match between the two clubs won by Vigo 3–2. This tournament was officially recognised by the board of directors of the RFEF on 25 March 2023.

Also, during the aforementioned FECF assembly of May 1912, there was a federative split. Some clubs, including Real Sociedad and FC Barcelona, left the FECF after various disagreements, founding at the end of the same year the Real Unión Española de Clubs de Foot-ball (RUECF) in San Sebastián. The FECF published the rules for the dispute of the second edition of the Concurso España, whose finals would begin on 6 September 1913. However, it did not take place because on that date the two aforementioned federations were in the process of dissolution and formation of the new Royal Spanish Football Federation (RFEF).

=== RUECF Copa España (1913) ===
The new RUECF immediately began to organize its own tournaments in parallel, firstly with the dispute of its own 1913 Copa del Rey, and after that with its tournament called Copa España in which foreign players were allowed. The participating clubs were FC Barcelona, Català FC, Pontevedra Auténtico, Real Club Coruña, Irún Sporting, Club Deportivo Bilbao and Real Sociedad. FC Barcelona, Pontevedra Auténtico and Real Sociedad qualified for the final round, which had been scheduled for July 25, 26 and 27. However, later it was postponed to the end of August, but it did not take place because at that time the RUECF and the FECF were in the process of dissolution and formation of the new RFEF.

== Champions ==
Season	Winners	Runners-up	Result (agg.)
1912	Deportivo La Coruña	Vigo FC	4–3
