= Dagoberto Moll =

Uruguayan footballer and manager (born 1927)

Personal information
- Full name: Dagoberto Moll Sequeira
- Date of birth: 22 July 1927 (age 99)
- Place of birth: Montevideo, Uruguay
- Position: Forward

Senior career*
| Years | Team | Apps | (Gls) |
| 1945–1949 | Miramar Misiones | | |
| 1949–1954 | Deportivo La Coruña | 121 | (33) |
| 1954–1955 | Barcelona | 16 | (4) |
| 1955–1957 | Condal | 23 | (2) |
| 1957 | Espanyol | 0 | (0) |
| 1957–1958 | Celta | 22 | (5) |
| 1959–1960 | Elche | 21 | (2) |
| 1961–1962 | Albacete | 28 | (3) |

International career
| 1949 | Uruguay | 6 | (2) |

Managerial career
- 1960–1961: Albacete
- 1962–1963: Compostela
- 1963–1964: Atlético Baleares
- 1964–1965: CE L'Hospitalet
- 1965–1966: Girona
- 1966–1967: Deportivo La Coruña
- 1966–1968: Gimnástica
- 1968–1970: Atlante
- 1971–1972: Atlante
- 1972–1973: Atlético Español
- 1973–1974: Tenerife
- 1975–1976: Levante
- 1976: Atlético Español
- 1976: Atlante
- 1978–1979: Atlético Español
- 1980–1981: Tampico
- 1985–1986: Compostela
- * Club domestic league appearances and goals

Dagoberto Moll Sequeira (born 22 July 1927) is a Uruguayan former professional football player and manager.

== Career ==
Moll is remembered for his part in the "Orquesta Canaro", an attacking line of Deportivo de La Coruña in the 1950s formed by Rafael Franco, Tino, Corcuera and Osvaldo. Moll was born in Montevideo. A forward, he played for Deportivo, Barcelona, Celta de Vigo and Elche in La Liga.

Moll coached Albacete Balompié, SD Compostela, Deportivo de La Coruña, CD Tenerife

== Career statistics ==
=== International ===
Appearances and goals by national team and year
| National team | Year | Apps | Goals |
|---|---|---|---|
| Uruguay | 1949 | 6 | 2 |
| Total | | 6 | 2 |

Scores and results list Uruguay's goal tally first, score column indicates score after each Moll goal.

List of international goals scored by Dagoberto Moll
| No. | Date | Venue | Opponent | Score | Result | Competition |
|---|---|---|---|---|---|---|
| 1 | 17 April 1949 | São Januário, Rio de Janeiro, Brazil | Bolivia | 1–1 | 2–3 | 1949 South American Championship |
| 2 | 4 May 1949 | Estádio General Severiano, Rio de Janeiro, Brazil | Peru | 1–3 | 3–4 | 1949 South American Championship |
