= Rodrigo García Vizoso =

Spanish footballer and manager

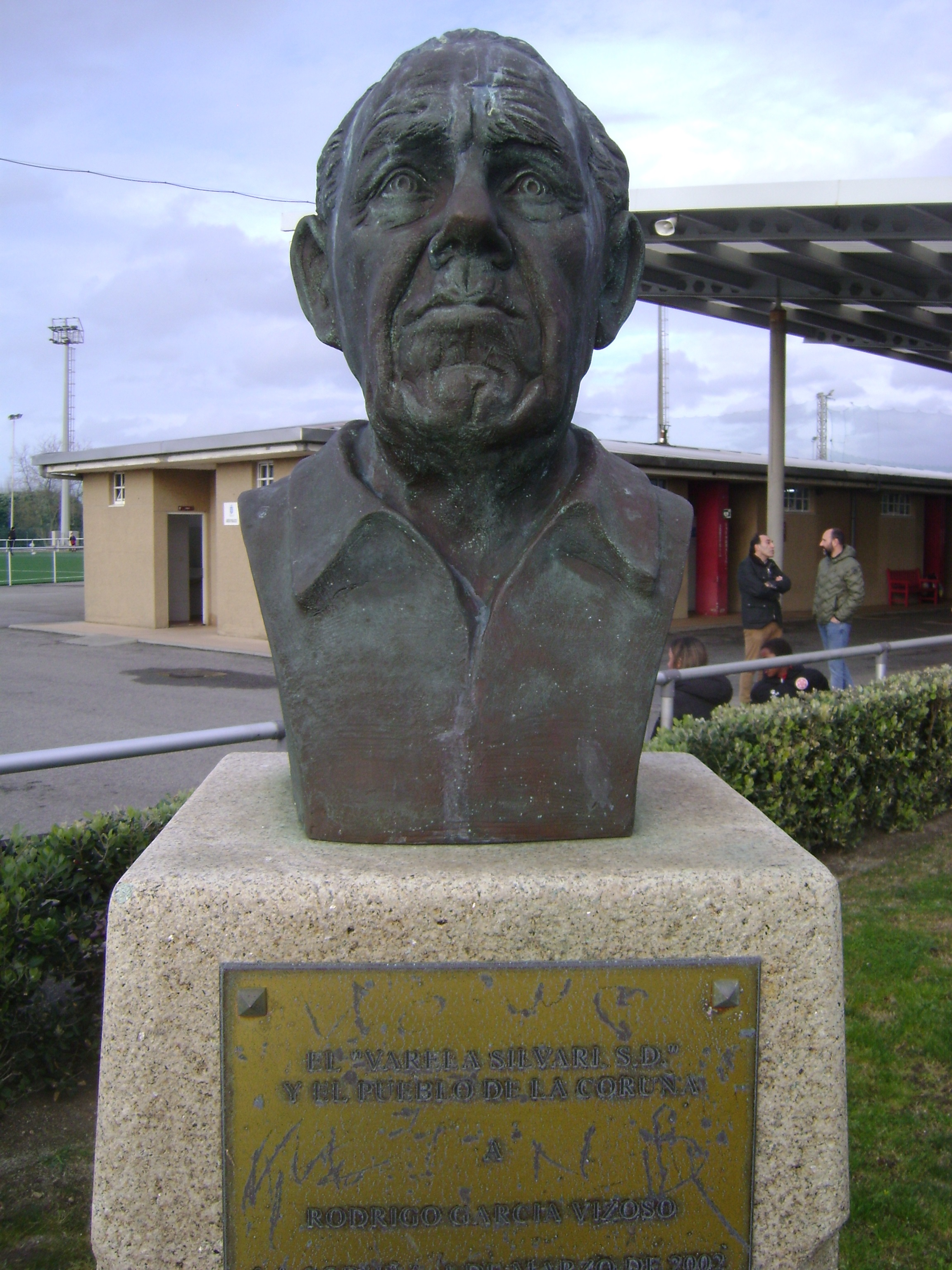
- Bust of Rodrigo García Vizoso near the Estadio Riazor, A Coruña

Personal information
- Date of birth: 26 February 1909
- Place of birth: A Coruña, Spain
- Date of death: 2 June 2009 (aged 100)
- Place of death: A Coruña, Spain
- Position: Goalkeeper

Senior career*
Years	Team	Apps	(Gls)
1927–1934	Deportivo de La Coruña		
1934–1935	Real Madrid C.F.		
1935–1936	Granada CF		
- * Club domestic league appearances and goals

Rodrigo García Vizoso (26 February 1909 – 2 June 2009) was a Spanish football goalkeeper. He was born in A Coruña, the son of a carpenter, and took up football at a young age. He joined his hometown team Deportivo de La Coruña in 1927 and remained with them until 1934, when his performance against Real Madrid C.F. impressed the owners enough that they signed him as a substitute for Ricardo Zamora. He spent only one season with Real Madrid, however, before leaving to play for Granada CF. When the Spanish Civil War Civil War broke out in 1936, he retired from football and spent nearly three years in the army.

In 1940 García Vizoso began working at the Fábrica de Armas and organized a team at the factory called Club Deportivo Aprendices de la Fábrica de Armas. In 1945 it changed its name to Club Deportivo Juvenil and won the Serie A Regional de Galicia. This led to the team being promoted to the Tercera División, where it remained until 1954, when it was promoted to the Segunda División for one year. García Vizoso then became coach of his old club, Deportivo de La Coruña, for part of the 1955-1956 season; he also took on this role for a period in the mid-1960s. He died on 2 June 2009 in A Coruña at the age of 100.
