= Eduardo Toba =

Spanish football manager (1923–2001)

Personal information
- Full name: Eduardo Toba Muíño
- Date of birth: 14 May 1923
- Place of birth: Muxia, Spain
- Date of death: 3 August 2001 (aged 78)
- Place of death: A Coruña, Spain

Managerial career
- Years: Team
- 1954–1955: Deportivo La Coruña
- 1956–1957: Real Oviedo
- 1958–1959: Deportivo La Coruña
- 1960–1961: Costa Rica
- 1961: Herediano
- 1962–1963: Tenerife
- 1964: Real Oviedo
- 1965–1966: Córdoba
- 1967: Hércules
- 1968–1969: Spain
- 1971–1973: Real Oviedo

Eduardo Toba Muíño (14 May 1923 – 3 August 2001) was a Spanish football manager. He coached Deportivo de La Coruña, Real Oviedo, Costa Rica, CS Herediano, Tenerife, Córdoba, Hércules and the Spain national team.
