= Eusebio Ríos =

Spanish footballer and manager

Personal information
- Full name: Eusebio Ríos Fernández
- Date of birth: 30 March 1935
- Place of birth: Portugalete, Spain
- Date of death: 10 May 2008 (aged 73)
- Place of death: Portugalete, Spain
- Position: Defender

Youth career
- Galindo Sestao
- Ortuella

Senior career*
Years	Team	Apps	(Gls)
1955–1956	Arenas Getxo		
1956–1958	Indautxu	52	(0)
1958–1968	Betis	218	(1)
Total		270	(1)

International career
1964	Spain	1	(0)

Managerial career
- 1970–1972: Jaén
- 1972–1975: Barakaldo
- 1976–1979: Recreativo
- 1979–1980: Valladolid
- 1981–1985: Murcia
- 1986–1987: Deportivo La Coruña
- 1988: Betis
- 1990–1992: Rayo Vallecano
- * Club domestic league appearances and goals

Eusebio Ríos Fernández (30 March 1935 – 10 May 2008) was a Spanish football defender and manager.

== Playing career ==
Born in Portugalete, Biscay, Ríos started his career in his native Basque Country, representing two teams. In 1958 he moved to Andalusia after signing with Real Betis, going on to play ten seasons with the club (nine in La Liga) before retiring in 1968 at 33; his debut in the top flight occurred on 21 September 1958 in a 4–2 win against Sevilla FC, in what was the first official match held at the Ramón Sánchez Pizjuán Stadium.

Ríos earned one cap for Spain, featuring the second half of the 2–1 friendly loss to Portugal in Porto, on 15 November 1964.

== Coaching career ==
Ríos began coaching in 1970, shortly after retiring. After two years with Real Jaén in the Tercera División and three with Barakaldo CF in the Segunda División, he signed with Recreativo de Huelva in the latter level, achieving the oldest club in Spain's first-ever top flight promotion, followed by immediate relegation.

In the following years, Ríos helped another two teams promote to the top division, Real Valladolid and Real Murcia CF, spending three seasons with the latter. After one and a half campaigns with Deportivo de La Coruña in the second tier he was appointed at his former side Betis, being sacked on 30 November 1988 following a 6–2 away loss against Atlético Madrid, in a relegation-ending season; he later worked with the club as director of football.

Ríos' last job was with Rayo Vallecano (two seasons), being one of two managers in 1991–92 – the other was a young José Antonio Camacho – as the Madrid outskirts team returned to the top flight. He was part of Athletic Bilbao's coaching staff in two separate seasons (1997–98 and 2001–02).

== Personal life ==
Ríos' son, Roberto, was also a footballer and a defender. He played his entire career with Betis and Athletic Bilbao, also going on to represent the national team.

== Death ==
Ríos died in his hometown of Portugalete on 10 May 2008, at the age of 73.

== Honours ==
Murcia

- Segunda División: 1982–83
