= Carlos Iturraspe =

Spanish footballer and manager

Personal information
- Full name: Carlos Iturraspe Cuevas
- Date of birth: 10 June 1910
- Place of birth: San Sebastián, Spain
- Date of death: 10 August 1981 (aged 71)
- Place of death: Valencia, Spain
- Position: Midfielder

Youth career
- Arandotarra
- Gure Choko

Senior career*
| Years | Team | Apps | (Gls) |
| ?–? | Sporting Madrid | | |
| ?–1933 | Nacional Madrid | | |
| 1933–1946 | Valencia | 168 | (5) |
| 1946–1948 | Levante | 29 | (1) |
| 1948 | Castellón | 0 | (0) |

Managerial career
- 1948–1953: Mestalla
- 1953: Atlético Tetuán
- 1953–1954: Deportivo La Coruña
- 1954–1956: Valencia
- 1956–1957: Betis
- 1957–1958: Deportivo La Coruña
- 1958: Málaga
- 1959–1961: Mestalla
- 1961–1962: Hércules
- 1964–1965: Mestalla
- * Club domestic league appearances and goals

Carlos Iturraspe Cuevas (10 June 1910 – 10 August 1981) was a Spanish football midfielder and manager.

== Football career ==
Born in San Sebastián, Gipuzkoa, Cuevas played solely with Valencia CF during his professional career, helping the Che to three major titles including the 1942 and 1944 conquests of La Liga, to which he contributed a total of 40 games.

He worked as a coach in the 1950s/60s, competing in the top division from 1953 to 1956: after leading Deportivo de La Coruña to the seventh place he was in charge of former club Valencia as it ranked fifth and sixth respectively, even though he did not finish the latter campaign, being fired in May 1956 after losing in the Copa del Rey to Real Jaén.
