= José Antonio Naya =

Spanish football manager (1934–2024)

Personal information
- Full name: José Antonio Naya Mella
- Date of birth: 30 April 1934
- Place of birth: A Coruña, Spain
- Date of death: December 2024 (aged 90)

Youth career
- Years: Team
- Deportivo La Coruña

Managerial career
- Júpiter Leonés
- Cultural Leonesa
- 1965–1966: Hullera
- 1967–1968: Alcalá
- 1969–1970: Toledo
- 1970–1971: Real Madrid Aficionados
- 1972: Cádiz
- 1972–1973: Getafe
- 1973–1974: Ourense
- 1974–1975: Burgos
- 1975–1976: Deportivo La Coruña
- 1976–1977: Murcia
- 1977–1979: Levante
- 1979–1980: Recreativo
- 1981–1982: Linares
- 1982–1983: Castellón
- 1984: Alavés
- 1984–1985: Granada
- 1987: Xerez
- 1989–1990: Real Burgos
- 1990–1991: Sabadell
- 1991–1992: Murcia
- 1993–1994: Cádiz
- 1995: Ourense

José Antonio Naya Mella (30 April 1934 – December 2024) was a Spanish football manager.

== Career ==
Naya was born in A Coruña, Galicia, and played youth football for Deportivo de La Coruña before joining the military service. After obtaining the coaching qualifications he became a manager, taking over lowly sides Júpiter Leonés, Cultural y Deportiva Leonesa, SD Hullera Vasco-Leonesa, RSD Alcalá and CD Toledo.

In 1972, after winning the amateur championship with Real Madrid Aficionados, Naya was appointed manager of Cádiz CF in Segunda División. After narrowly avoiding relegation, he was named in charge of Tercera División side Getafe Deportivo in November of that year, as the side only won one point in their first ten matches; he took the club to a mid-table finish before moving to CD Ourense in the second division in December 1973.

Naya subsequently worked at Burgos CF, Deportivo, Real Murcia (two stints), Levante UD, Recreativo de Huelva, Linares CF, CD Castellón, Deportivo Alavés, Granada CF, Xerez CD, Real Burgos CF, CE Sabadell FC, Cádiz and Ourense. With Real Burgos he won the second division in 1989–90, but was subsequently replaced by Novoa.

== Death ==
Naya died in December 2024, at the age of 90. His funeral was held on 10 December.

== Honours ==
Levante

- Segunda División B: 1978–79

Real Burgos

- Segunda División: 1989–90
