= Juan Acuña =

Spanish footballer (1923–2001)

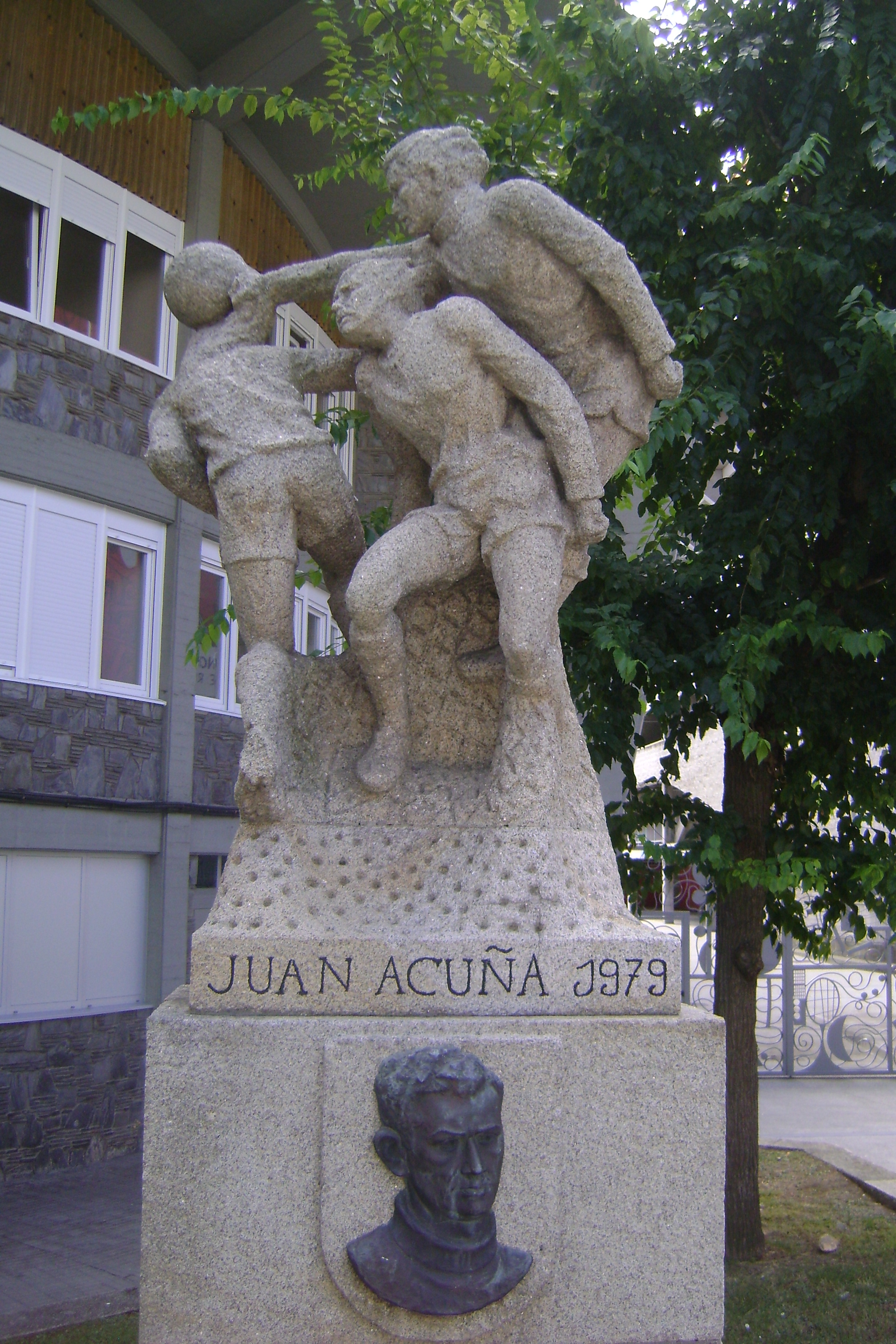
- Sculpture dedicated to Juan Acuña near the Estadio Riazor, A Coruña

Personal information
- Full name: Juan Acuña Naya
- Date of birth: 14 February 1923
- Place of birth: A Coruña, Spain
- Date of death: 30 August 2001 (aged 78)
- Place of death: A Coruña, Spain
- Position: Goalkeeper

Senior career*
Years	Team	Apps	(Gls)
- Sporting Coruñés
- Eureka
1938–1955	Deportivo de A Coruña	278	(0)

International career
1941	Spain	1	(0)
- * Club domestic league appearances and goals

Juan Acuña Naya (14 February 1923 – 30 August 2001) was a Spanish football goalkeeper who spent most of his playing career with Deportivo de La Coruña.

== Biography ==
Born in A Coruña, he started his career with Sporting Coruñés. Naya then went on to play for Eureka before joining Deportivo de la Coruña in 1938 with whom he would play until 1955. He played his first game with Deportivo in Ferrol in 1938. The following year, he signed a new contract with Deportivo with a salary of 300 pesetas per month.

He suffered many problems because of injuries and being overweight. He is the goalkeeper with second-most Zamora Trophies with four, behind Antoni Ramallets with five wins.

In 1961, he was offered a tribute match between Deportivo and CD Ourense. In 1990 Deportivo created a Trophy with his name.

== Honours ==
Individual

- Zamora Trophy: 1941–42, 1942–43, 1949–50, 1950–51
