= Chacho (footballer) =

Spanish footballer

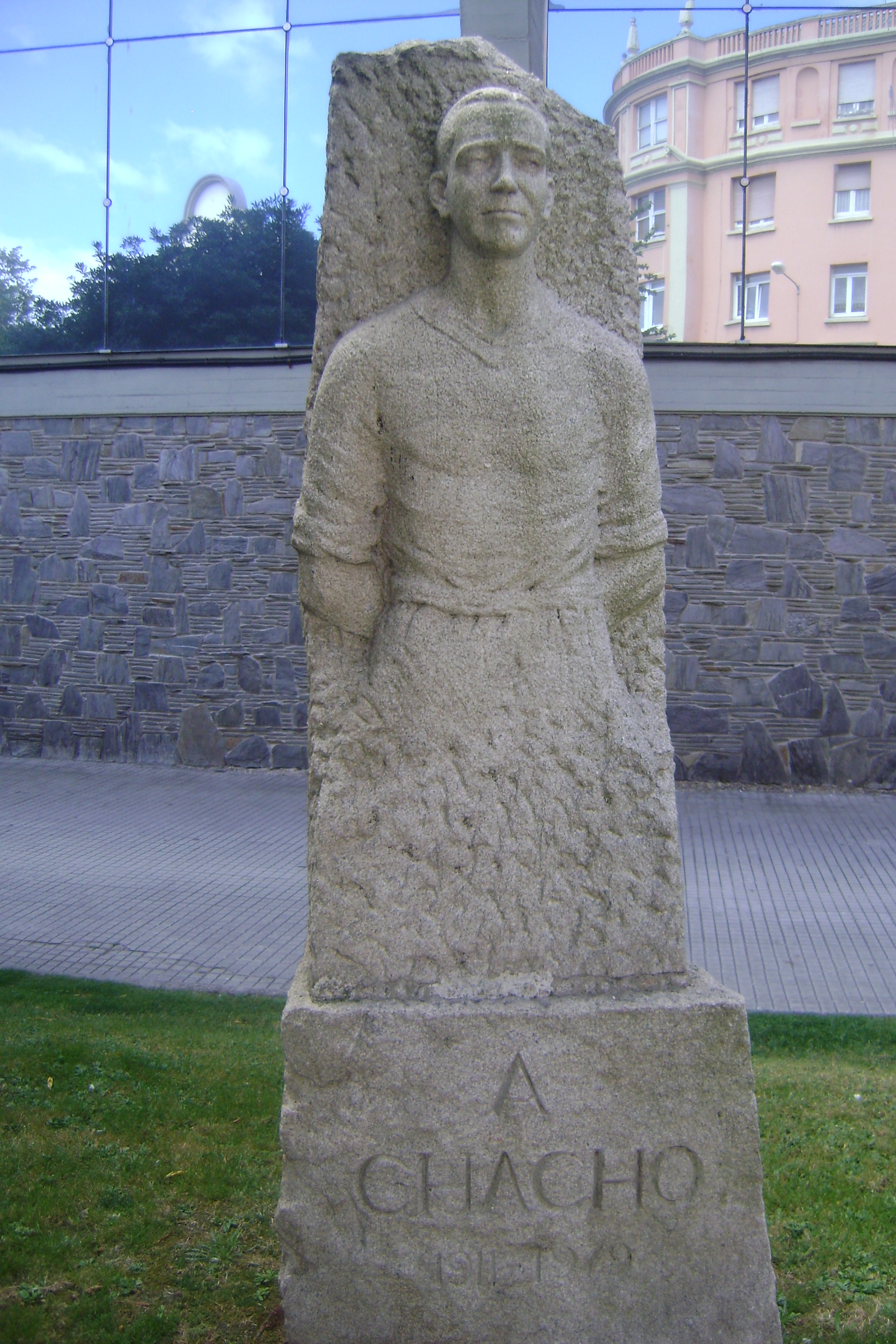
- Sculpture dedicated to Chacho near the Estadio Riazor, A Coruña

Personal information
- Full name: Eduardo González Valiño
- Date of birth: 14 April 1911
- Place of birth: A Coruña, Spain
- Date of death: 21 October 1979 (aged 68)
- Place of death: A Coruña, Spain
- Position: Striker

Senior career*
Years	Team	Apps	(Gls)
1927–1934	Deportivo de La Coruña	50	(23)
1934–1936	Atlético de Madrid	39	(13)
1936–1946	Deportivo de La Coruña	63	(22)
Total		152	(58)

International career
1933–1934	Spain	3	(7)

Managerial career
- 1942: Deportivo de La Coruña
- 1951–1952: Deportivo de La Coruña
- * Club domestic league appearances and goals

Eduardo González Valiño, nicknamed Chacho (14 April 1911 – 21 October 1979) was a Spanish association footballer. Chacho was born and died in A Coruña. During his career he played for Atlético de Madrid (1934–1936) and Deportivo de La Coruña (1927–1934, 1936–1946).

He later coached Deportivo, and a statue erected in his name can be found by the Riazor stadium.

== International career ==
He managed to score 7 goals for the Spain national football team in only 3 caps, in part thanks to a 6-goal haul against Bulgaria on 21 May 1933, in a 13–0 win. His other international goal came in the Iberian Derby on 11 March 1934, scoring his side's first of an eventual 9–0 win. He also participated in the 1934 FIFA World Cup.

== International goals ==
Scores and results list Spain's goal tally first.

List of international goals scored by Chacho
No.	Date	Venue	Opponent	Score	Result	Competition
1	21 May 1933	Chamartín, Madrid, Spain	Bulgaria	1–0	13–0	Friendly
3	21 May 1933	Chamartín, Madrid, Spain	Bulgaria	2–0	13–0	Friendly
3	21 May 1933	Chamartín, Madrid, Spain	Bulgaria	3–0	13–0	Friendly
4	21 May 1933	Chamartín, Madrid, Spain	Bulgaria	9–0	13–0	Friendly
5	21 May 1933	Chamartín, Madrid, Spain	Bulgaria	11–0	13–0	Friendly
6	21 May 1933	Chamartín, Madrid, Spain	Bulgaria	13–0	13–0	Friendly
7	11 March 1934	Chamartín, Madrid, Spain	Portugal	1–0	9–0	1934 FIFA World Cup qualification
