= García Verdugo =

Spanish footballer and manager

Personal information
- Full name: Francisco Javier García Verdugo Garrido
- Date of birth: 6 July 1934
- Place of birth: Madrid, Spain
- Date of death: 9 June 2017 (aged 82)
- Place of death: Talavera de la Reina, Spain
- Height: 1.85 m (6 ft 1 in)
- Position: Defender

Youth career
- Talavera

Senior career*
Years	Team	Apps	(Gls)
1950–1952	Talavera		
1952–1953	Toledo		
1953–1954	Logroñés	21	(0)
1954–1955	Atlético Madrid	0	(0)
1955	Zaragoza	0	(0)
1955–1958	Xerez	80	(7)
1958–1960	Cádiz	56	(1)
1960–1963	Valladolid	78	(0)
1963–1966	Valencia	27	(0)
1964–1965	→ Sabadell (loan)	25	(0)
1966–1967	Deportivo La Coruña	9	(0)
Total		301	(8)

Managerial career
- 1969–1972: Tenerife
- 1972: Salamanca
- 1973: Córdoba
- 1974–1975: Gimnàstic
- 1976–1977: Rayo Vallecano
- 1977–1979: Osasuna
- 1979–1980: Deportivo La Coruña
- 1981–1982: Deportivo Aragón
- 1984–1985: Real Burgos
- * Club domestic league appearances and goals

Francisco Javier García Verdugo Garrido (6 July 1934 – 9 June 2017), known as García Verdugo, was a Spanish footballer who played as a defender, and manager.
