= Deportivo de A Coruña =

Spanish professional football club

Deportivo A Coruña
- Full name: Real Club Deportivo de A Coruña, S.A.D.
- Nicknames: Os Branquiazuis (The Blue and Whites); Os Hercúleos / Los Herculinos (The Herculeans)
- Short name: Deportivo; Dépor
- Founded: 8 December 1906; 119 years ago as Club Deportivo de la Sala Calvet
- Stadium: Riazor
- Capacity: 32,490
- Owner: Abanca Corporación Bancaria (99%)
- President: Juan Carlos Escotet
- Head coach: Antonio Hidalgo
- League: La Liga
- 2025–26: Segunda División, 2nd of 22 (promoted)
- Website: rcdeportivo.es
Home colours	Away colours	Third colours

Real Club Deportivo de A Coruña (lit. 'Royal Sporting Club of A Coruña'; spelled as Deportivo da Coruña in Galician) or simply Deportivo A Coruña is a Spanish professional football club based in the city of A Coruña, Galicia that competes in La Liga, the top tier of Spanish football league system.

Founded in 1906 as Club Deportivo de la Sala Calvet by Federico Fernández-Amor Calvet, Deportivo have won the La Liga title once, in the 1999–2000 season, and finished as runners-up on five occasions. The club have also won the Spanish Cup twice (1994–95 and 2001–02), three Spanish Super Cups (1995, 2000 and 2002), and the now defunct Concurso España (1912). The Blue and Whites were a regular fixture in the top positions of La Liga for the best part of 20 years, from 1992 to 2010, finishing in the top half of the table in 16 out of 19 seasons, and are ranked 12th in the all-time La Liga table. As a result, the club was a regular participant in European competitions, playing in the UEFA Champions League for five consecutive seasons between 2000–01 and 2004–05, reaching the quarter-finals twice and reaching the semi-finals in the 2003–04 season.

Deportivo have played their home games at the 32,490-capacity Riazor since 1944, when the stadium was built. Their traditional home kit consists of blue and white striped shirts with blue shorts and socks. The club has a long-standing rivalry with Celta Vigo, and matches between the two sides are known as the Galician derby.

== History ==
=== Foundation and first steps ===
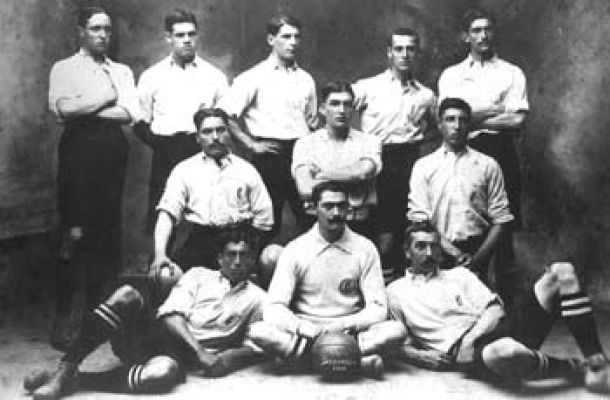
Deportivo Sala Calvet in 1908

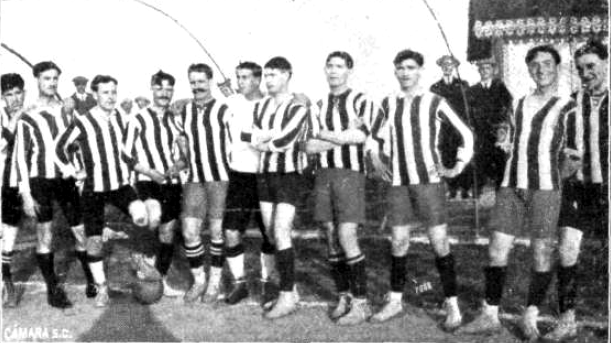
Real Club Deportivo's first team in the 1912 Concurso España

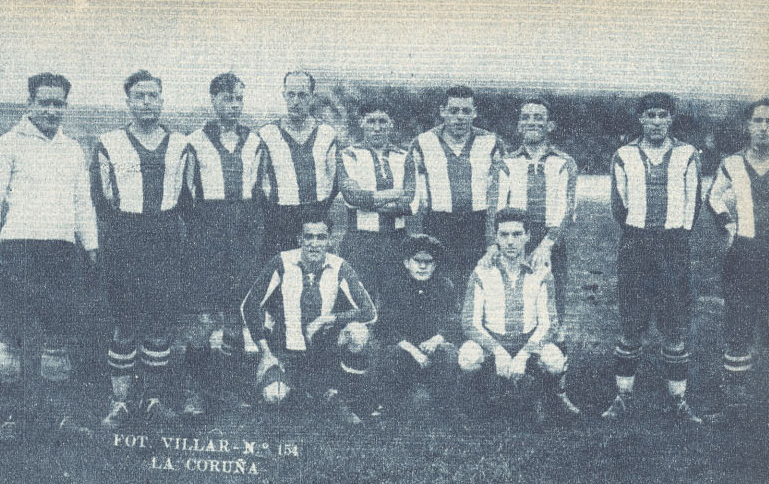
Real Club Deportivo de La Coruña in 1927

Unlike what happened in most of the Iberian Peninsula, football did not reach the city of A Coruña through the English, instead, it was introduced by José María Ábalo, a youngster who had returned to his hometown after studying in England. The game gained rapid popularity and several teams were formed on an informal basis.

In December 1906, members of Sala Calvet gymnasium formed Deportivo de La Coruña, naming Luis Cornide as the first president. In May 1907, Alfonso XIII of Spain granted the club the "Real" ("royal") denomination. Dépor started playing at Corral de la Gaiteira ("Piper's Yard"), but soon moved to Old Riazor, a new ground near the Riazor beach.

The team played friendly matches regularly and competed in local leagues, but failed to achieve success in the Copa del Rey in its early years. However, in 1912 Deportivo won their first official title, the short-lived Concurso España.

In 1920, the Spanish national team made its debut at the Summer Olympics in Antwerp. A good run for Spain increased the popularity of football, and as a result, many teams gained professional status, and a league competition was established and scheduled for the 1928–29 season.

=== 1928–1947: Segunda División and the top flight ===
In 1928, Dépor failed to qualify for the first ever Primera División, instead competing in the Segunda División, where it finished eighth out of ten. The team kept battling over the next few years in a division that was soon to undergo many structural and geographical changes. In 1932, in the Cup, Dépor defeated Real Madrid, which had gone unbeaten through the entire season in the league.

In 1936, the Spanish Civil War broke out, forcing the abandonment of all official competitions until the 1939–40 season. That year, The Herculeans qualified for the promotion stage. The final game was against archrivals Celta de Vigo, who were fighting to avoid relegation. Celta won 1–0 and remained in the top flight as Depor's hopes of promotion were denied. The following season, however, the club reached the promotion play-offs again, this time beating Murcia 2–1 to earn promotion to La Liga for the first time in the team's history.

The first season in the top flight saw the club finish fourth. However, the club declined in the next few seasons, finishing ninth, 12th and, in 1944–45, 14th, resulting in relegation. Instant promotion was achieved the following year, but Dépor were relegated again at the end of the 1946–47 season. Nonetheless, the team gained instant promotion in 1947–48.

This decade saw Depor's entrance to the top flight, so the club decided to build a new ground, Riazor, which remains their home today. It was opened on 28 October 1944 with a league game against Valencia. In this era, the key player of the team was Juan Acuña, the club's goalkeeper. "Xanetas", as he was known by locals, earned four Zamora Trophies between 1942 and 1951, making him the second-most decorated keeper in the Spanish league.

=== 1948–1957: The "Golden Decade" ===
The club ended the 1948–49 season in tenth place. The next season would see their first major achievement in the league; Dépor finished as runners-up, just one point behind Atlético Madrid under the management of Argentinian Alejandro Scopelli, who brought to the club a group of South American players such as Julio Corcuera, Oswaldo García, Rafael Franco and Dagoberto Moll, a group that made the team more competitive and able to remain top flight status for nine consecutive seasons until 1957. During that period, managers like Helenio Herrera and renowned players like Pahiño and Luis Suárez played at the Riazor.

=== 1958–1973: "Elevator Team" ===
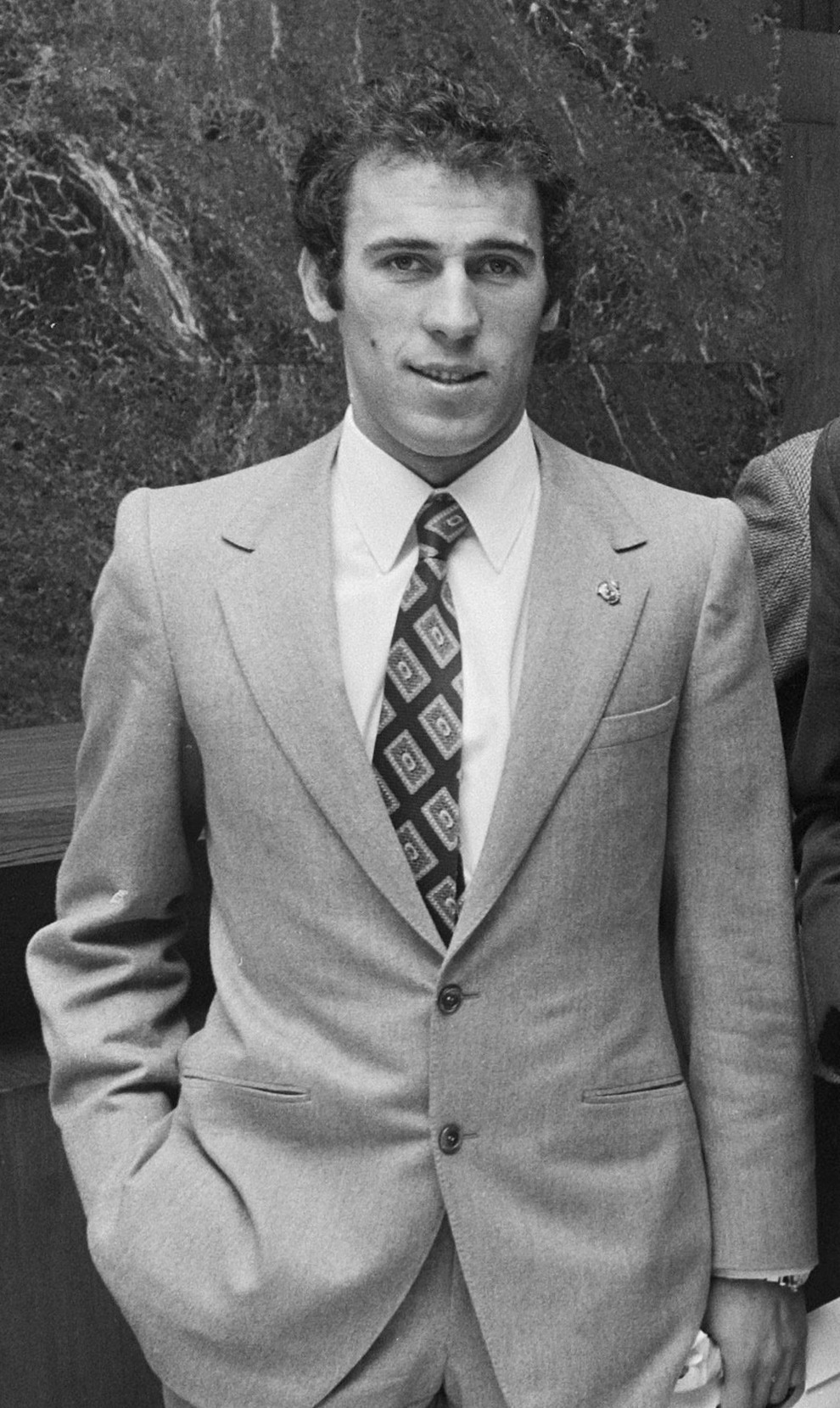
Amancio Amaro played for Deportivo between 1958 and 1962.

After nine seasons of first-tier football in Spain, the team was relegated to the Segunda División in 1957 and stayed there for five seasons until 1962, when they were promoted into the top flight. This started a yo-yo era that led the club to be known as the "elevator team"; promotions were achieved in 1962, 1964, 1966, 1968 and 1971, yet subsequent relegations occurred during 1963, 1965, 1967, 1970 and 1973.

Dépor had one of the best youth systems at the time in Spain, as youngsters including Amancio Amaro, Severino Reija, José Luis Veloso and Jaime Blanco began their careers at the Riazor, in the future to become regular fixtures on the Spanish national team. Still more, including Luis Suárez, went on to play for larger clubs in Spain and Europe. However, the difficult financial situation of the club led to the forced sales of these players, and the team could not consolidate themselves in the top flight. This "yo-yo era" ended with relegation from the Primera División in 1973.

=== 1974–1988: Dark times ===
After being relegated in 1973, the team struggled in the Second Division, failing to avoid another relegation and falling to the third tier (Tercera División) for the first time in their history. However, Dépor gained instant promotion and established themselves in the second tier for the rest of the decade. In 1980, Dépor were again relegated to the newly created Segunda División B, the third tier, again for the second time in their history. Again, however, the drop was short-lived as the team gained promotion the following season. Notably, Dépor were relegated and promoted along with arch-rivals Celta de Vigo, who played during the 1980–81 season the most attended games ever in Spain's third tier.

The club continued to play in the Second Division, showing little chance of being promoted back to the top flight. In the 1987–88 season, Dépor struggled and only avoided relegation after Vicente Celeiro scored a goal during added time against Racing Santander in the last game of the season. This is often regarded as the end of the club's dark times and the beginning of a new era.

During this period, the club was heavily affected by financial difficulties and internal troubles with managers being sacked almost every year. In the summer of 1988, an open and popular club assembly chose a new board of directors headed by Augusto César Lendoiro. Deportivo had a debt estimated at 600 million pesetas, had been out of the top flight for 15 years and lacked established structures at economic and sporting level.

=== 1989–1998: Resurgence and "Súper Dépor" ===
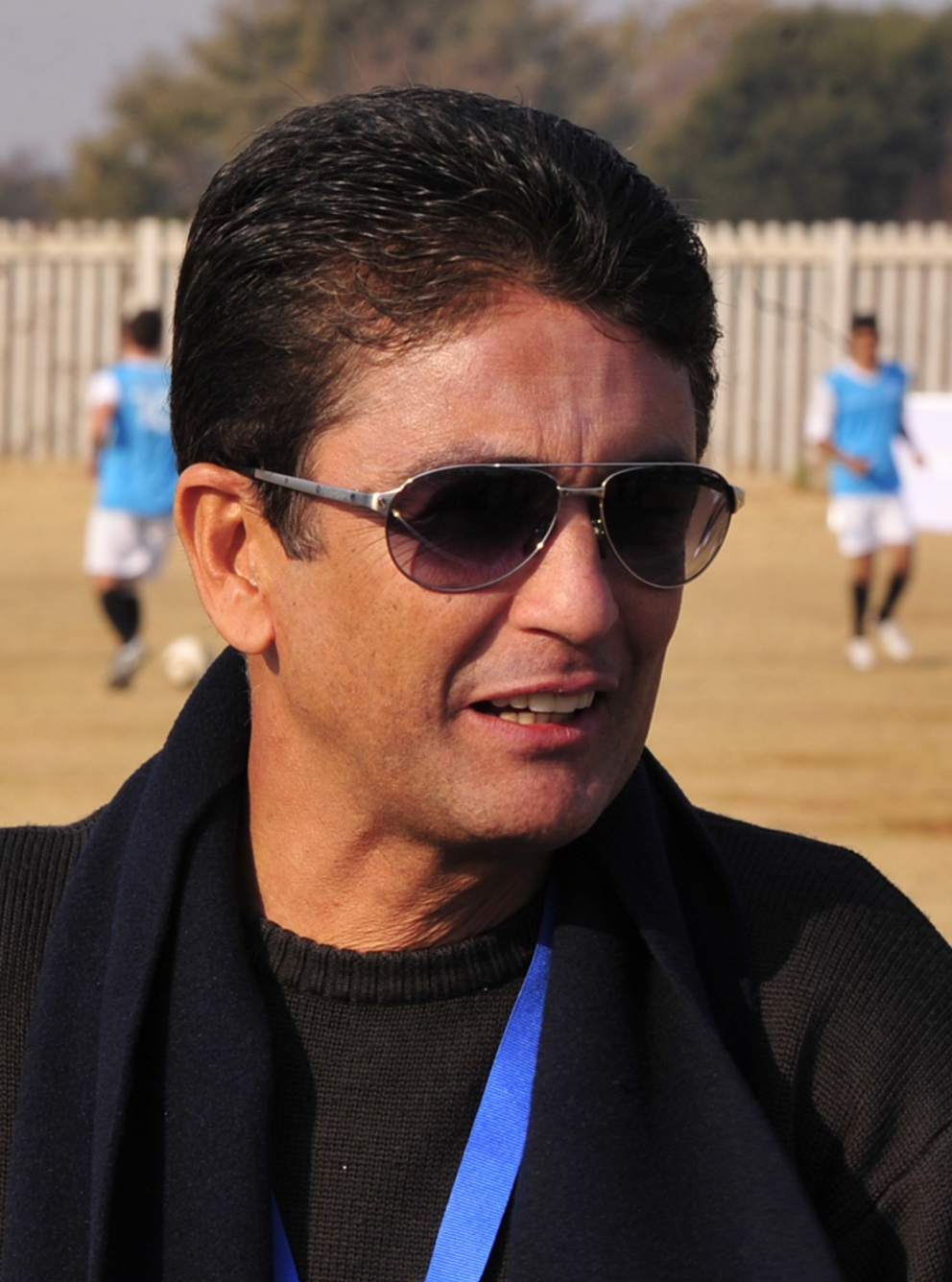
Bebeto was the symbol of Súper Dépor

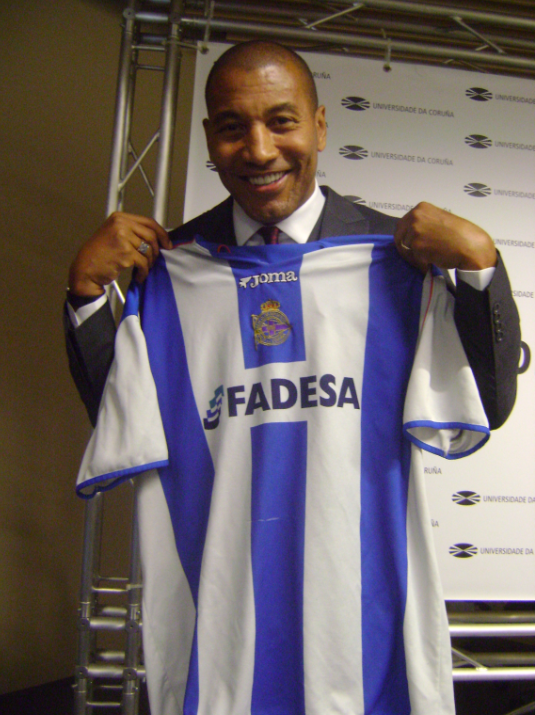
Mauro Silva

Arsenio Iglesias, a former Deportivo player and manager, was again appointed as manager in the 1988–89 season. Dépor had a lengthy run in the Copa del Rey, though ultimately falling in the semi-finals to Real Valladolid. The next year, the team competed well in the league and qualified for the promotion play-offs, but expectations were denied again, this time by Tenerife. The 1990–91 season saw Dépor finishing as runners-up, finally achieving promotion to La Liga after an 18-year absence. Additionally, the club's finances began to improve and social support increased, especially amongst youth groups.

The 1991–92 season, the team's first back in the top flight, saw Dépor struggle, and they were forced to take part in the relegation play-off, beating Real Betis in a two-legged round. In 1992, Arsenio Iglesias began his fourth spell as Dépor manager; experienced players were also added to the team during that period, including López Rekarte, Paco Liaño, Claudio Barragán, José Luis Ribera, Adolfo Aldana and Donato, along with promising youngsters such as local player Fran and Brazilians Bebeto and Mauro Silva.

The 1992–93 Deportivo squad experienced a resurgent season, placing in top positions all season and ultimately finishing third after champions Barcelona and runners-up Real Madrid, respectively, thus qualifying for European competition for the first time in their history. That year, the club also provided La Liga's Pichichi Trophy winner, Bebeto, and its Zamora Trophy winner, Paco Liaño. Additionally, Dépor made a historic comeback against Real Madrid at Riazor, trailing 2–0 at half-time but winning the game 3–2 and starting a run of 18 seasons to Los Blancos without a win at A Coruña.

In 1993–94, Dépor had another fantastic season, leading the table for the majority of the year and coming to the last matchday in first to face mid-table Valencia, knowing a win would ensure the first league title in club history. The game was very close, but near its end, Valencia's Serer conceded a penalty on Nando. Regular penalty-taker Donato had been substituted, so Serbian defender Miroslav Đukić took it, but Valencia keeper González caught the ball; Deportivo saw their possible league title denied. After the frustration passed, the fans nonetheless recognised the impressive season the club had: Paco Liaño earned his second Zamora Trophy after conceding just 18 goals in 38 games, and Dépor made its debut in European competitions with the UEFA Cup, beating Aalborg and Aston Villa but losing to Eintracht Frankfurt in the round of 16.

The 1994–95 season began with manager Arsenio Iglesias stating he would leave the club after the end of the year, though Dépor made another great campaign finishing again as runners-up, this time to Real Madrid. In that season's UEFA Cup, Deportivo were beaten again in the round of 16 by a German club, this time by Borussia Dortmund 3–2 on aggregate. Depor had won the first leg at home 1–0, and Dortmund equalized in the second leg to send the match into extra time. Now in extra time, Depor scored a second goal to put the match at 2–1, but with five minutes remaining, Dortmund scored two goals in two minutes to win the series. Despite this tough defeat, the season still hid a great surprise for the club, as Dépor made a fantastic run in Copa del Rey and reached the final for the first time in club history, against Valencia. On 24 June 1995, at the Santiago Bernabéu, the final was levelled at 1–1 when referee García-Aranda suspended the game in the 80th minute due to heavy rain and a hailstorm. It was decided that the game would resume three days later. Two minutes after the match resumed, Alfredo Santaelena scored a header, which proved to be the winning goal that handed Depor their first major title (notwithstanding the 1912 Concurso España).

The 1995–96 season was an average one for Depor; they finished ninth in the league table, but reached the semi-finals of the Cup Winners' Cup, losing to eventual champions PSG. The 1997–98 season was very disappointing; the team only finished twelfth in the league table, failed to qualify for European competitions, were eliminated in the first round of the UEFA Cup by French club Auxerre, and were eliminated by second-tier side Deportivo Alaves in the Copa del Rey. José Manuel Corral was replaced in the offseason by Javier Irureta. Under Irureta, the 1998–99 season was better and Deportivo finished sixth in the league, qualifying for the following season's UEFA Cup first round.

=== 1999–2006: La Liga title, "El Centenariazo", and European Glory days ===
In 1999–2000, Deportivo, managed by Irureta and with players like Noureddine Naybet, Djalminha, Fran, Roy Makaay and Mauro Silva, finally won their first La Liga title, five points ahead of Barcelona and Valencia. With this title, La Coruña became the second-smallest Spanish city—with a population of approximately 250,000, behind San Sebastián (home of Real Sociedad)—to have ever won La Liga. In the UEFA Cup, the club reached the quarter-finals, being eliminated by eventual finalists Arsenal.

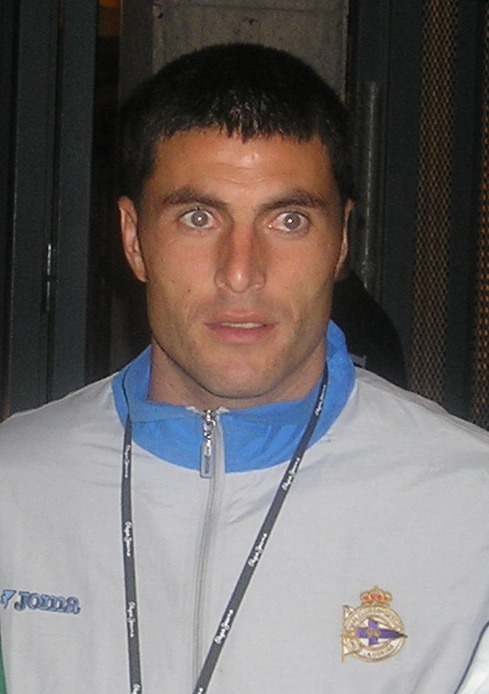
Diego Tristán

As league champions, Deportivo qualified for the UEFA Champions League for the first time in its history. Their first match was a 1–1 draw against Panathinaikos in Athens. They went on to top their group unbeaten with two wins and four draws. In the second group stage, they also topped their group, and Deportivo were now looking to be one of the strongest teams in the competition. However, in the quarter finals, they lost the first leg 3–0 to Leeds United, and although Depor won the second leg at Riazor 2–0, it was not enough and they were eliminated. The following campaign, they were unbeaten in the first group stage again, including two wins against Manchester United. They progressed out of the second group stage into the quarter-finals, where they were eliminated by the team they beat twice in the group stage, Manchester United.

Chart of Deportivo league performance since 1929

In the 2001–02 season, Depor finished league runner-up to Valencia and won the Copa del Rey for a second time with a 2–1 win against Real Madrid on 6 March 2002. This match is commonly known in Spain as the Centenariazo. Deportivo's opponents were expected to win the final comfortably as they were nicknamed the Galácticos and were among the strongest teams in Europe at the time. Additionally, the final was being played at their home ground, the Santiago Bernabéu. Everything was prepared so that after the expected victory, Real Madrid could celebrate their 100th anniversary by lifting the trophy in front of their own fans. However, Deportivo spoiled the party with a 2–1 win with goals from Sergio and Diego Tristán.

Depor's best Champions League campaign was in the 2003–04 season, where they lost to eventual winners Porto by a narrow 1–0 aggregate scoreline in the semi-finals. Although this was their best Champions League campaign, the club also had its biggest defeat in European competitions, losing 8–3 to Monaco in the group stage. However, this campaign is also remembered for their stunning comeback against Milan in the quarter-finals. Milan won the first leg 4–1 at San Siro, but in the second leg at Riazor, Deportivo won 4–0 and eliminated the defending champions 5–4 on aggregate.

Deportivo had a mediocre 2004–05 season. The team finished eighth in La Liga, only good enough to qualify for the Intertoto Cup. In the Champions League, the club had their worst campaign ever, finishing bottom of their group without winning a single match, and without scoring a single goal. This season ended the club's spell of five consecutive years playing Champions League football.

In the summer of 2005, manager Javier Irureta was replaced by Joaquín Caparrós, ending his seven-year spell at the club.

=== 2007–2015: Transition and decline ===
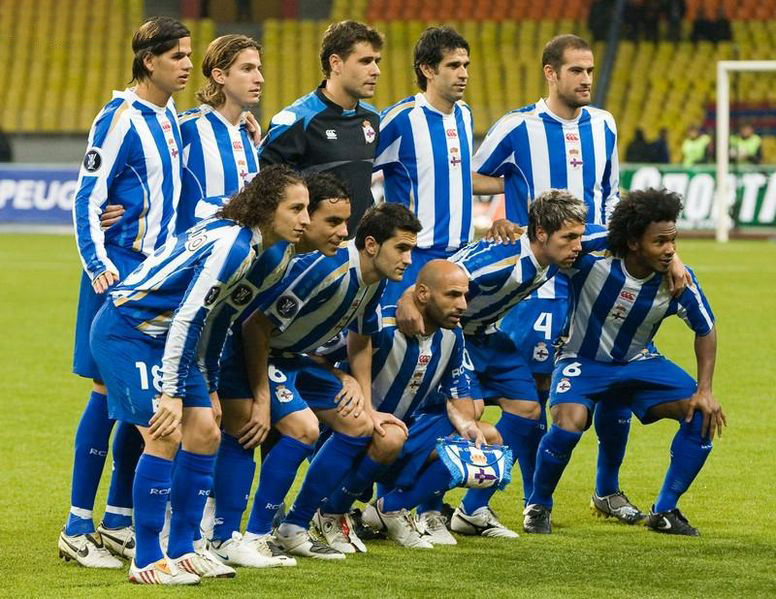
Deportivo played in UEFA Cup in the 2008–09 season.

In the 2006–07 season, Deportivo finished 13th in the league, their worst finish since 1992, and Caparros resigned at the end of the season. The 2007–08 season was a slight improvement, with the club finishing in 9th under new manager Miguel Ángel Lotina, but were eliminated in the Copa del Rey by Espanyol at the first hurdle. Deportivo's 2008–09 season was better, with the club beating Bnei Sakhnin in the 2008 Intertoto Cup to progress to the UEFA Cup, where the club was eliminated 6–1 by Danish club AaB in the round of 32. Deportivo's period in the top flight came to an end as they were relegated after finishing 18th in 2010–11. In July 2015, however, it was suspected that in the final round of matches for that season, Levante and Real Zaragoza were involved in a match-fixing scandal which ensured that the latter won 2–1 at the Estadi Ciutat de València and remained in the division at the expense of Deportivo, who lost 2–0 at home to Valencia. The case was in Courts until December 2020, when the match fixing was discarded by the Provincial Court.

In the 2011–12 season, Deportivo made an immediate return to the top flight, winning the title with a Segunda Division record of 91 points. Lassad Nouioui was the top scorer with 14 goals, Andrés Guardado the top assistant and Álex Bergantiños the only player to participate in all league matches.

In the 2012–13 season, Deportivo finished 19th after a turbulent campaign under three managers, and once again were relegated to the Segunda División. Deportivo, however, finished second in the 2013–14 season, guaranteeing promotion to the top-flight for the second time in three years. A 2014–15 campaign back in the top division with a disjointed squad featured some poor performances on the pitch under new manager Víctor Fernández, including an 8–2 defeat at home to Real Madrid. This was especially disappointing considering the 18-match unbeaten home run between 1992–93 and 2010–11 at the Riazor against Real Madrid, a feat which no other team has managed to achieve in the history of Spanish football. Deportivo ultimately finished the season in 16th place and avoided relegation after appointing former player Víctor Sánchez as manager on 9 April 2015, for the remaining eight matches of the season.

=== 2015–present: "New Dépor", relegation to third division and return ===
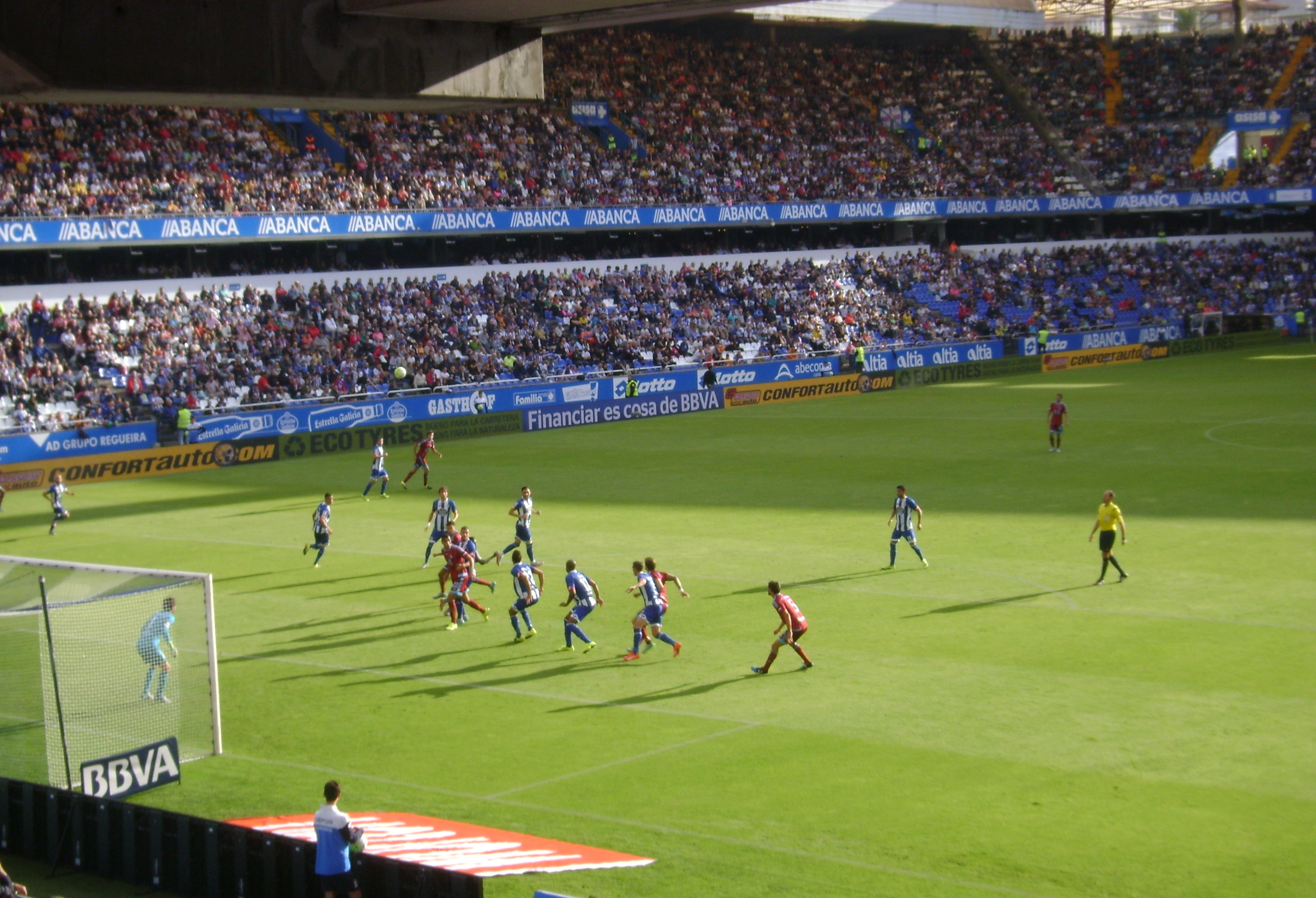
Match at Riazor in 2015

With Víctor Sánchez as their new manager, Deportivo made changes for the new season. With the addition of new players Alejandro Arribas, Fernando Navarro, Pedro Mosquera and Fayçal Fajr, Deportivo began the season with a 0–0 draw against Real Sociedad. On 28 November 2015, with a 2–0 victory against Las Palmas, Deportivo were in fifth place after an impressive start. However, after a disastrous second half of the season, which was precipitated by a 3–0 home defeat to Mirandés in the Copa del Rey, Deportivo won only two matches out of the next 22, including an 8–0 humiliation at the hands of Barcelona, and only secured their safety in La Liga in the penultimate game of the season with a victory over Villarreal. Sánchez was sacked on 29 May 2016 after several incidents of player unrest within the squad.

The team continued in a negative spiral in the following seasons. At the end of the 2017–18 season, Deportivo was relegated following a 4–2 home defeat to Barcelona, which also secured Barcelona the La Liga title. The following season, the club played in Segunda División and finished sixth. In the promotion play-offs, Deportivo lost to Mallorca 3–2 on aggregate and remained in Segunda División. In the following campaign Deportivo was relegated once again, falling down into Segunda División B for the first time in 39 years. In 2020–21, the league system in Spain was reorganized and Deportivo was almost relegated to the newly formed fourth division, Segunda Federación, escaping relegation by just one point. Thus, they remained in the third division, in the newly formed Primera División RFEF, for the 2021–22 season.

After spending four seasons in the third tier, Deportivo finally won promotion back to the second division and thus professional football by finishing in first place in Group 1 of the 2023–24 Primera Federación. The deciding match against Barcelona Atlètic in the 36th round was attended by 31,833 spectators, a new Primera Federación attendance record, as Deportivo won 1–0 thanks to a goal from Lucas Pérez.

In the 2025–26 season, Deportivo achieved promotion back to La Liga after a 2–0 win against Real Valladolid on the penultimate day, returning to the top flight after an eight-year absence. After the promotion, the club adopted a new name and logo, dropping the Spanish term of the city (La Coruña) and adopting the Galician one (A Coruña).

== Identity ==
=== Crest ===
A sky blue diagonal strip on Deportivo crest is based on the Galician flag.

Deportivo's crest contains cues to predecessor Sala Calvet's crest, with a gentlemen's belt encircling the purple and white banner of the gymnasium. The banner itself features a sky blue diagonal strip which represents the maritime flag of A Coruña and the Galician flag. In addition, it features a crown which represents its royal patronage (granted in 1909 by Alfonso XIII). During the Spanish Republic, the honorific real (royal) and the crown were removed from the club crest, but the name and the crown returned after the Spanish Civil War and the start of the Franco regime.

=== Kit ===
Deportivo have always played in blue and white striped kits, but the club only officially adopted these colours for matches in 1912. Deportivo continues to wear blue and white striped shirts with blue shorts and socks, while their second and third kits change periodically according to commercial interests. Their current shirt sponsors are local brewery Hijos de Rivera (through the Estrella Galicia brand), with Nike manufacturing the kits.

Years	Kit manufacturer	Sponsor	
Years	Kit manufacturer	Brand	Company
1990–92	Rox	Leyma	Leite Rio, S.L.
1992–97	Umbro	Feiraco	Feiraco Sociedad Cooperativa Galega
1997–00	Adidas	Feiraco	Feiraco Sociedad Cooperativa Galega
2000–01	Adidas	Dreamcast	Sega Europe Ltd
2001–07	Joma	Fadesa	Fadesa Inmobiliaria, S.A.
2007–08	Canterbury	Fadesa	Fadesa Inmobiliaria, S.A.
2008–09	Canterbury	Estrella Galicia	Hijos de Rivera, S.A.U.
2009–17	Lotto	Estrella Galicia 0,0	Hijos de Rivera, S.A.U.
2017–21	Macron	Estrella Galicia 0,0	Hijos de Rivera, S.A.U.
2021–26	Kappa	Estrella Galicia 0,0	Hijos de Rivera, S.A.U.
2026–	Nike	Estrella Galicia 0,0	Hijos de Rivera, S.A.U.

=== Supporters ===
Deportivo's supporters are known as deportivistas. According to a 2007 survey by the Centro de Investigaciones Sociológicas, Deportivo was the ninth team in Spain in terms of number of fans, with a total of 2.2%. Fans organise themselves into around 200 fan groups known as peñas, with the most well-known being the "Riazor Blues". The interests of the supporters are represented by the Federación de Peñas RC Deportivo.

In the 2022–23 season, despite playing in the third tier, the club had 25,001 season ticket holders. In March 2023, a match against Real Madrid Castilla attracted a total of 26,745 fans, the fifth largest attendance of any football match played in Spain that weekend, bettered by only four teams from the top flight. However, in the promotion play-offs, Deportivo fans broke the record again, reaching a total of 28,828 for the match against Castellón. That match was the fourth most attended match in Spain that weekend.

== Stadium ==
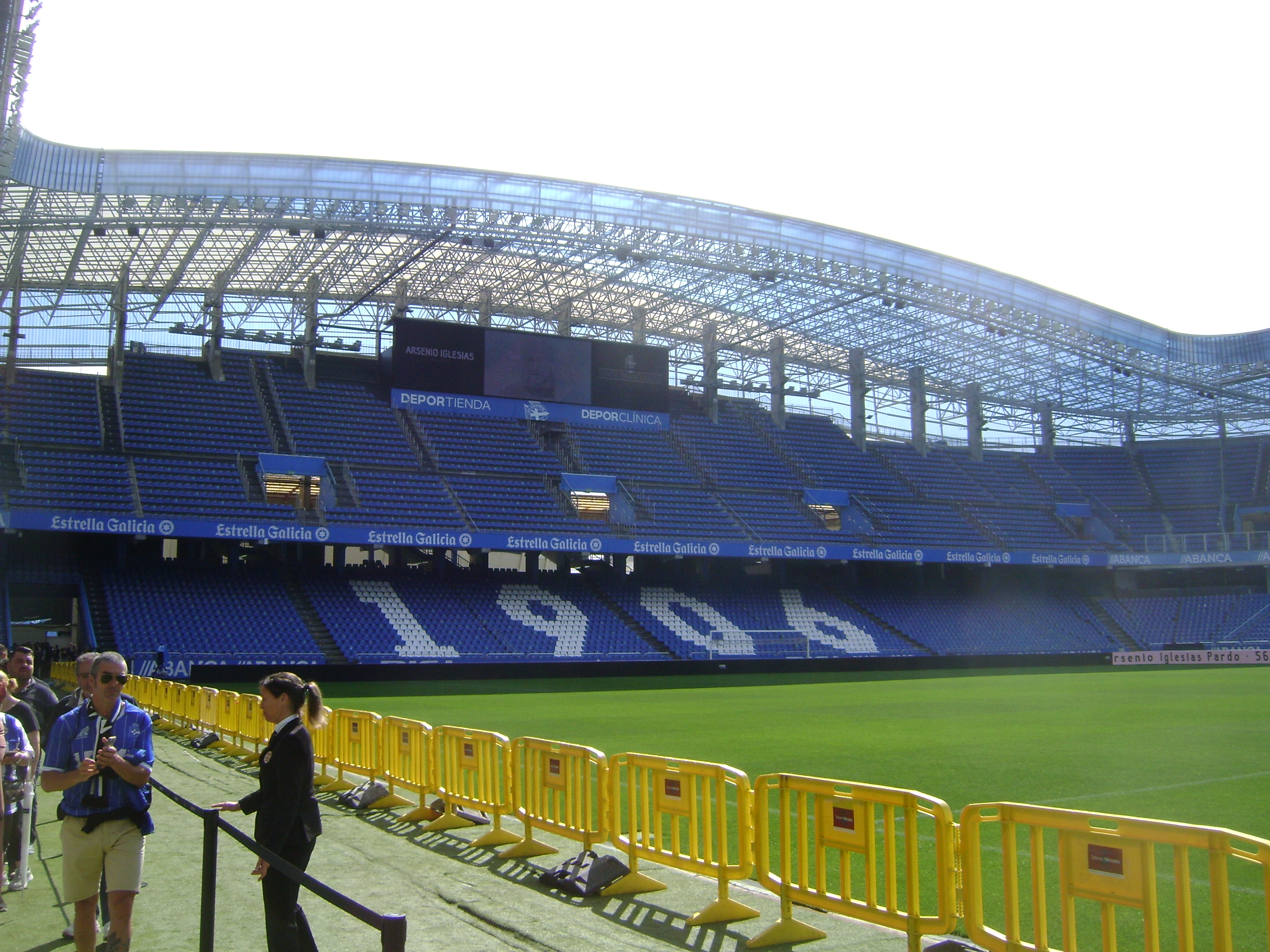
Estadio Riazor in 2023

- Name – Abanca-Riazor
- City – A Coruña
- Capacity – 32,490
- Inauguration – 1944
- Pitch size – 105 x 68 m

== Players ==
=== First-team squad ===
As of 16 September 2026

Note: Flags indicate national team as defined under FIFA eligibility rules; some limited exceptions apply. Players may hold more than one non-FIFA nationality.

No.	Pos.	Nation	Player
1	GK	ESP	Germán Parreño
2	DF	ESP	Adrià Altimira
3	DF	ESP	Arnau Comas
4	DF	BEL	Lucas Noubi
5	DF	ESP	Dani Barcia
6	MF	ESP	Marc Casadó (on loan from Barcelona)
7	FW	GAB	Pierre-Emerick Aubameyang
8	MF	ESP	Diego Villares (captain)
9	FW	NED	Zakaria Eddahchouri
10	FW	ESP	Yeremay Hernández
11	FW	ESP	David Mella
12	DF	ITA	Giacomo Quagliata
13	GK	ESP	Leo Román

No.	Pos.	Nation	Player
14	MF	ESP	Riki Rodríguez
15	DF	ESP	Miguel Loureiro
16	MF	ITA	Lorenzo Amatucci
17	DF	ESP	Angeliño (on loan from Roma)
18	MF	DEN	Jonathan Asp Jensen
19	FW	ESP	Luismi Cruz
20	DF	URU	José María Giménez (on loan from Atlético Madrid)
21	MF	ESP	Mario Soriano
22	DF	POL	Bright Ede
23	DF	ESP	Ximo Navarro
24	FW	ESP	Adama Traoré
25	GK	ESP	Álvaro Fernández
32	FW	CMR	Bil Nsongo

=== Reserve team ===
Note: Flags indicate national team as defined under FIFA eligibility rules; some limited exceptions apply. Players may hold more than one non-FIFA nationality.

No.	Pos.	Nation	Player
31	FW	ESP	Martín Ochoa
33	FW	ESP	Kevin Sánchez
35	MF	ESP	Rubén López

No.	Pos.	Nation	Player
36	MF	ESP	Yayo González
37	MF	ESP	Noé Carrillo

=== Out on loan ===
Note: Flags indicate national team as defined under FIFA eligibility rules; some limited exceptions apply. Players may hold more than one non-FIFA nationality.

No.	Pos.	Nation	Player
—	GK	ESP	Eric Puerto (at Penafiel until 30 June 2027)
—	MF	NED	Teun Gijselhart (at Al Ain until 30 June 2027)

No.	Pos.	Nation	Player
—	MF	ESP	Diego Gómez (at Huesca until 30 June 2027)
—	MF	ENG	Charlie Patino (at VfL Bochum until 30 June 2027)

== Technical staff ==
Position	Staff
Head coach	(Spain) Antonio Hidalgo
Assistant coach	(Spain) Ignasi Salafranca
Technical assistant	(Spain) Óscar Hernández
Goalkeeping coach	(Spain) Alberto Casal
Fitness coaches	(Spain) Sergio Roca (Spain) Roberto Cabellud
Analysts	(Spain) Asier Marote (Spain) Alejandro Antón
Delegate	(Spain) Pablo Barros
Equipment managers	(Spain) Diego Díaz (Spain) Arnau Domínguez
Doctor	(Spain) Alejandro Mejuto
Physiotherapists	(Spain) Daniel Varela (Spain) Rúben Barreiro (Spain) Emilio Pena
Nutritionist	(Spain) Daniel Pedrosa
Podiatrist	(Spain) Manuel Mosqueira
Rehab fitness coach	(Spain) Fernando Rodríguez
Psychologist	(Spain) Joaquín Sorribas

Last updated: 5 September 2025
Source: RC Deportivo (in Spanish)

== List of head coaches ==
Years	Name
1906–27	Unknown
1927–28	(Spain) Félix Gila
1928–29	(Hungary) Ferenc Woggenhuber
1929–33	(Spain) Félix Gila
1933	(Spain) José Planas
1933	(Spain) Fernando Fariña
1933–36	(Spain) José Torres
1939–41	(Spain) Hilario Marrero
1941	(Spain) Celso Mariño
1941–1942	(Spain) Chacho
1942–1943	(Spain) Celso Mariño
1943–1945	(Spain) Ramón de la Fuente
1945–1947	(Spain) Hilario Marrero
1947	(Spain) Juan Aurre
1947–1948	(Spain) Luis Urquiri
1948–1949	(Spain) Gabriel Andonegui
1949	(Spain) Cuqui Bienzobas
1949–1950	(Argentina) Alejandro Scopelli
1950–1951	(Argentina) Jerónimo Díaz
1951–1952	(Spain) Chacho
1952–1953	(Spain) Francisco Casal
1953	(Argentina) Helenio Herrera

Years	Name
1953–1954	(Spain) Carlos Iturraspe
1954–1955	(Spain) Eduardo Toba
1955–1956	(Spain) R.G. Vizoso
1956	(Spain) Pahiño
1956–1957	(Spain) Ángel Zubieta
1957	(Spain) Diego Villalonga
1957–1958	(Spain) Roberto Ozores
1958	(Spain) Carlos Iturraspe
1958	(Spain) Eduardo Toba
1958–1959	(Spain) Ernesto Pons
1959	(Spain) Hilario Marrero
1959–1961	(Spain) Jesús Barrio
1961–1962	(Spain) Juan Otxoantezana
1962	(Spain) Enric Rabassa
1962–1963	(Spain) R.G. Vizoso
1963	(Spain) Lelé
1963–1964	(Argentina) Roque Olsen
1964	(Spain) Juan Otxoantezana
1964–1965	(Argentina) Luis Carniglia
1965–1967	(Spain) Enrique Orizaola
1967	(Uruguay) Dagoberto Moll
1967–1968	(Spain) Pedro Eguiluz

Years	Name
1968–1970	(Spain) Cheché Martín
1970	(Argentina) Roque Olsen
1970–1973	(Spain) Arsenio Iglesias
1973	(Chile) Fernando Riera
1973–1974	(Spain) Carlos Torres
1974	(Spain) Enrique Orizaola
1974–1975	(Spain) José Antonio Irulegui
1975–1976	(Spain) José Antonio Naya
1976	(Spain) Cheché Martín
1976	(Spain) Héctor Rial
1976–1977	(Spain) Cheché Martín
1977	(Spain) José López
1977–1978	(Spain) Juan Arza
1978	(Spain) Enrique Mateos
1978–1979	(Spain) Luis Suárez
1979–1980	(Spain) Francisco García Verdugo
1980	(Spain) Joseíto
1980–1981	(Spain) Pepe Martínez
1981–1982	(Spain) Luis Rodríguez Vaz
1982–1985	(Spain) Arsenio Iglesias
1985–1986	(Spain) Jesús Aranguren
1986–1987	(Spain) Eusebio Ríos

Years	Name
1987–1988	(Spain) Luis Rodríguez Vaz
1988–1991	(Spain) Arsenio Iglesias
1991–1992	(Spain) Marco Antonio Boronat
1992–1995	(Spain) Arsenio Iglesias
1995–1997	(Wales) John Toshack
1997	(Spain) José Manuel Corral
1997	(Brazil) Carlos Alberto Silva
1997–1998	(Spain) José Manuel Corral
1998–2005	(Spain) Javier Irureta
2005–2007	(Spain) Joaquín Caparrós
2007–2011	(Spain) Miguel Ángel Lotina
2011–2012	(Spain) José Luis Oltra
2012–2013	(Portugal) Domingos Paciência
2013–2014	(Spain) Fernando Vázquez
2014–2015	(Spain) Víctor Fernández
2015–2016	(Spain) Víctor Sánchez
2016–2017	(Spain) Gaizka Garitano
2017	(Spain) Pepe Mel
2017–2018	(Spain) Cristóbal Parralo
2018	(Netherlands) Clarence Seedorf
2018–2019	(Spain) Natxo González
2019	(Spain) José Luis Martí

Years	Name
2019	(Spain) Juan Antonio Anquela
2019	(Spain) Luis César Sampedro
2019–2021	(Spain) Fernando Vázquez
2021	(Spain) Rubén de la Barrera
2021–2022	(Spain) Borja Jiménez
2022–2023	(Spain) Óscar Cano
2023	(Spain) Rubén de la Barrera
2023–2024	(Spain) Imanol Idiakez
2024–2025	(Spain) Óscar Gilsanz
2025–present	(Spain) Antonio Hidalgo

== Honours ==
=== Domestic league ===
- La Liga
  - Winners (1): 1999–2000
- Segunda División
  - Winners (5): 1961–62, 1963–64, 1965–66, 1967–68, 2011–12
- Tercera División
  - Winners (1): 1974–75
- Primera Federación
  - Winners (1): 2023–24

=== Domestic cups ===
- Copa del Rey
  - Winners (2): 1994–95, 2001–02
- Supercopa de España
  - Winners (3): 1995, 2000, 2002
- Concurso España
  - Winners (1): 1912

=== Regional tournaments ===
- Galician Championship
  - Winners (6): 1926–27, 1927–28, 1930–31, 1932–33, 1936–37, 1939–40
- Copa Galicia
  - Winners (1): 1945–46

=== International tournaments ===
- UEFA Intertoto Cup
  - Winners (1): 2008 (joint winners)

=== Friendly tournaments ===
- Teresa Herrera Trophy
  - Winners (26): 1955, 1962, 1964, 1969, 1995, 1997, 1998, 2000, 2001, 2002, 2003, 2004, 2005, 2006, 2007, 2008, 2012, 2014, 2015, 2016, 2017, 2019, 2020, 2022, 2023, 2025
  - Runners-up (13): 1966, 1971, 1987, 1991, 1994, 2009, 2010, 2011, 2013, 2018, 2021, 2024, 2026
- Teide Trophy
  - Winners (2): 1971, 2017

=== Individual trophies ===
- Pichichi (3):

1992–93 – Bebeto (29 goals)
2001–02 – Diego Tristán (21 goals)
2002–03 – Roy Makaay (29 goals) (European Golden Shoe)

- Zamora (8):

1941–42 – Juan Acuña
1942–43 – Juan Acuña
1949–50 – Juan Acuña
1950–51 – Juan Acuña
1953–54 – Juan Otero
1992–93 – Francisco Liaño (tied with Santiago Cañizares)
1993–94 – Francisco Liaño
1996–97 – Jacques Songo'o

== Statistics ==
=== Season-by-season ===
Season	Tier	Division	Place	Copa del Rey
1929	2	2ª	8th	
1929–30	2	2ª	7th	
1930–31	2	2ª	9th	Round of 32
1931–32	2	2ª	4th	Quarter-finals
1932–33	2	2ª	5th	Quarter-finals
1933–34	2	2ª	7th	Round of 16
1934–35	2	2ª	7th	Second round
1935–36	2	2ª	7th	Second round
1939–40	2	2ª	1st	Round of 16
1940–41	2	2ª	2nd	Third round
1941–42	1	1ª	4th	Round of 16
1942–43	1	1ª	9th	Quarter-finals
1943–44	1	1ª	12th	Round of 16
1944–45	1	1ª	14th	First round
1945–46	2	2ª	2nd	First round
1946–47	1	1ª	13th	First round
1947–48	2	2ª	2nd	Sixth round
1948–49	1	1ª	10th	Round of 16
1949–50	1	1ª	2nd	Round of 16
1950–51	1	1ª	12th	First round

Season	Tier	Division	Place	Copa del Rey
1951–52	1	1ª	11th	First round
1952–53	1	1ª	14th	
1953–54	1	1ª	7th	Round of 16
1954–55	1	1ª	7th	Quarter-finals
1955–56	1	1ª	12th	Round of 16
1956–57	1	1ª	15th	Quarter-finals
1957–58	2	2ª	13th	
1958–59	2	2ª	7th	Round of 16
1959–60	2	2ª	4th	Round of 32
1960–61	2	2ª	3rd	Round of 32
1961–62	2	2ª	1st	Round of 32
1962–63	1	1ª	14th	Round of 32
1963–64	2	2ª	1st	Round of 16
1964–65	1	1ª	16th	Round of 16
1965–66	2	2ª	1st	Round of 16
1966–67	1	1ª	16th	Round of 16
1967–68	2	2ª	1st	First round
1968–69	1	1ª	10th	Quarter-finals
1969–70	1	1ª	14th	Round of 32
1970–71	2	2ª	3rd	Quarter-finals

Season	Tier	Division	Place	Copa del Rey
1971–72	1	1ª	14th	Fourth round
1972–73	1	1ª	17th	Quarter-finals
1973–74	2	2ª	18th	Fourth round
1974–75	3	3ª	1st	Third round
1975–76	2	2ª	5th	First round
1976–77	2	2ª	11th	Third round
1977–78	2	2ª	8th	Third round
1978–79	2	2ª	15th	Third round
1979–80	2	2ª	18th	Second round
1980–81	3	2ª B	2nd	First round
1981–82	2	2ª	12th	Quarter-finals
1982–83	2	2ª	4th	Round of 16
1983–84	2	2ª	9th	Quarter-finals
1984–85	2	2ª	13th	Round of 16
1985–86	2	2ª	6th	Third round
1986–87	2	2ª	2nd	Third round
1987–88	2	2ª	16th	Third round
1988–89	2	2ª	10th	Semi-finals
1989–90	2	2ª	4th	First round
1990–91	2	2ª	2nd	Round of 16

Season	Tier	Division	Place	Copa del Rey
1991–92	1	1ª	17th	Semi-finals
1992–93	1	1ª	3rd	Fourth round
1993–94	1	1ª	2nd	Round of 16
1994–95	1	1ª	2nd	Winner
1995–96	1	1ª	9th	Round of 16
1996–97	1	1ª	3rd	Round of 16
1997–98	1	1ª	12th	Quarter-finals
1998–99	1	1ª	6th	Semi-finals
1999–2000	1	1ª	1st	Round of 16
2000–01	1	1ª	2nd	Round of 32
2001–02	1	1ª	2nd	Winner
2002–03	1	1ª	3rd	Semi-finals
2003–04	1	1ª	3rd	Round of 16
2004–05	1	1ª	8th	Round of 32
2005–06	1	1ª	8th	Semi-finals
2006–07	1	1ª	13th	Semi-finals
2007–08	1	1ª	9th	Round of 32
2008–09	1	1ª	7th	Round of 16
2009–10	1	1ª	10th	Quarter-finals
2010–11	1	1ª	18th	Quarter-finals

Season	Tier	Division	Place	Copa del Rey
2011–12	2	2ª	1st	Round of 32
2012–13	1	1ª	19th	Round of 32
2013–14	2	2ª	2nd	Third round
2014–15	1	1ª	16th	Round of 32
2015–16	1	1ª	15th	Round of 16
2016–17	1	1ª	16th	Round of 16
2017–18	1	1ª	18th	Round of 32
2018–19	2	2ª	6th	Second round
2019–20	2	2ª	19th	Second round
2020–21	3	2ª B	4th / 2nd	Second round
2021–22	3	1ª RFEF	2nd	Second round
2022–23	3	1ª Fed.	4th	First round
2023–24	3	1ª Fed.	1st	Second round
2024–25	2	2ª	15th	Second round
2025–26	2	2ª	2nd	Round of 16
2026–27	1	1ª		

- 47 seasons in Primera División
- 43 seasons in Segunda División
- 3 seasons in Primera Federación/Primera División RFEF
- 2 seasons in Segunda División B
- 1 season in Tercera División

=== List of seasons ===
Season	Div.	Pos.	Pld	W	D	L	GS	GA	P	Cup	Europe		Supercup	Notes	Manager(s)
1985–86	2	6	38	17	11	10	54	37	45	Third round					Jesús Aranguren
1986–87	2	2	34	16	11	7	46	33	43	Third round					Eusebio Ríos
1987–88	2	16	38	8	15	15	35	47	31	Third round					Eusebio Ríos, Arsenio Iglesias
1988–89	2	10	38	16	8	14	43	35	40	Semi-final					Arsenio Iglesias
1989–90	2	4	38	19	6	13	45	38	44	First round					Arsenio Iglesias
1990–91	2	2	38	8	15	15	60	32	48	Round of 16				Promoted	Arsenio Iglesias
1991–92	1	17	38	8	15	15	37	48	31	Semi-final					Marco Antonio Boronat, Arsenio Iglesias
1992–93	1	3	38	22	10	6	67	33	54	Fourth round					Arsenio Iglesias
1993–94	1	2	38	22	12	4	54	18	56	Round of 16	UC	Third round			Arsenio Iglesias
1994–95	1	2	38	20	11	7	68	42	51	Winners	UC	Third round			Arsenio Iglesias
1995–96	1	9	42	16	13	13	63	44	61	Round of 16	CWC	Semi-final	Winners		John Toshack
1996–97	1	3	42	21	14	7	57	30	77	Round of 16					John Toshack, Carlos Alberto Silva
1997–98	1	12	38	12	13	13	44	46	49	Quarter-final	UC	First round			Carlos Alberto Silva, José Manuel Corral
1998–99	1	6	38	17	12	9	55	43	63	Semi-final					Javier Irureta
1999–00	1	1	38	21	6	11	66	44	69	Round of 16	UC	Fourth round			Javier Irureta
2000–01	1	2	38	22	7	9	73	44	73	Round of 32	UCL	Quarter-final	Winners		Javier Irureta
2001–02	1	2	38	20	8	10	65	41	68	Winners	UCL	Quarter-final			Javier Irureta
2002–03	1	3	38	22	6	10	67	47	72	Semi-final	UCL	Second group stage	Winners		Javier Irureta
2003–04	1	3	38	21	8	9	60	34	71	Round of 16	UCL	Semi-final			Javier Irureta
2004–05	1	8	38	12	15	11	46	50	51	Round of 32	UCL	Group stage			Javier Irureta
2005–06	1	8	38	15	10	13	47	45	55	Semi-final	IT	Final			Joaquín Caparrós
2006–07	1	13	38	12	11	15	32	45	47	Semi-final					Joaquín Caparrós
2007–08	1	9	38	15	7	16	46	47	52	Round of 32					Miguel Ángel Lotina
2008–09	1	6	38	16	10	12	48	47	58	Round of 16	UC	Round of 32			Miguel Ángel Lotina
2009–10	1	10	38	13	8	17	35	49	47	Quarter-final					Miguel Ángel Lotina
2010–11	1	18	38	10	13	15	31	47	43	Quarter-final				Relegated	Miguel Ángel Lotina
2011–12	2	1	42	29	4	9	76	45	91	Round of 32				Promoted	José Luis Oltra
2012–13	1	19	38	8	11	19	47	70	35	Round of 32				Relegated	José Luis Oltra, Domingos, Fernando Vázquez
2013–14	2	2	42	19	12	11	48	36	69	Third round				Promoted	Fernando Vázquez
2014–15	1	16	38	7	14	17	35	60	35	Round of 32					Victor Fernández, Víctor Sánchez
2015–16	1	15	38	8	18	12	45	61	42	Round of 16					Víctor Sánchez
2016–17	1	16	38	8	12	18	43	61	36	Round of 16					Gaizka Garitano, Pepe Mel
2017–18	1	18	38	6	11	21	38	76	29	Round of 32				Relegated	Pepe Mel, Cristóbal Parralo, Clarence Seedorf
2018–19	2	6	42	17	17	8	49	31	68	Second round				Lost in play-offs	Natxo González, José Luis Martí
2019–20	2	19	42	12	15	15	43	60	51	Second round				Relegated	Juan Antonio Anquela, Luis César Sampedro, Fernando Vázquez
2020–21	3	4 / 2 (Note: Deportivo finished 4th in Group 1 (subgroup A) in the first phase, and then 2nd in the Primera División RFEF promotion Group 1 (subgroup D) in the second phase, determining which teams would go to Primera División RFEF and which to Segunda División RFEF.)	24	11	6	7	22	13	39	Second round					Fernando Vázquez, Rubén de la Barrera
2021–22	3	2	38	22	8	8	59	29	74	Second round				Lost in play-offs	Borja Jiménez
2022–23	3	4	38	18	13	7	53	29	67	First round				Lost in play-offs	Borja Jiménez, Óscar Cano, Rubén de la Barrera
2023–24	3	1	38	22	12	4	64	27	78	Second round				Promoted	Imanol Idiakez
2024–25	2	15	42	13	14	15	56	54	53	Second round					Imanol Idiakez, Óscar Gilsanz
2025–26	2	2	42	22	11	9	65	44	77	Round of 16				Promoted	Antonio Hidalgo

Key

1	Winners
2	Runners-up
	Relegated

- Div. = Division
- Pos. = Position
- PL = Games played
- W = Games won
- D = Games drawn
- L = Games lost
- GS = Goals scored
- GA = Goals against
- P = Points

== European record ==
Competition	Played	Won	Drew	Lost	GF	GA	GD	Win%
UEFA Champions League	62	25	17	20	78	79	−1	40.32
UEFA Cup Winners' Cup	8	4	2	2	14	3	+11	50.00
UEFA Cup / UEFA Europa League	32	14	5	13	43	36	+7	43.75
UEFA Intertoto Cup	10	8	0	2	18	10	+8	80.00
Total	112	51	24	37	153	128	+25	45.54

Source: UEFA.com
Pld = Matches played; W = Matches won; D = Matches drawn; L = Matches lost; GF = Goals for; GA = Goals against; GD = Goal Difference.

== Player records ==
=== Most appearances ===
No.	Name	Matches
1	(Spain) Fran	700
2	(Spain) Manuel Pablo	482
3	(Brazil) Mauro Silva	459
4	(Spain) Juan Carlos Valerón	422
5	(Spain) Donato	393
6	(Spain) Sergio	383
7	(Spain) Juan Acuña	363
8	(Spain) Álex Bergantiños	336
9	(Spain) Francisco García Fernández	331
10	(Spain) José Domínguez Rial	327

=== Most goals ===
No.	Name	Goals
1	(Spain) Diego Tristán	110
2	(Spain) José Manuel Traba	107
3	(Spain) José Luis Veloso	106
4	(Brazil) Bebeto	102
5	(Netherlands) Roy Makaay	97
6	(Spain) Manuel Guimeráns	90
7	(Spain) Vicente Celeiro	82
8	(Spain) José Luis Vara	80
9	(Spain) Alfonso Castro	75
10	(Spain) Amancio	69

== Former international players ==
- (Argentina) Fabricio Coloccini
- (Argentina) Aldo Duscher
- (Argentina) Jonás Gutiérrez
- (Argentina) Germán Lux
- (Argentina) Lionel Scaloni
- (Bosnia and Herzegovina) Haris Medunjanin
- (Brazil) Bebeto
- (Brazil) Djalminha
- (Brazil) Flávio Conceição
- (Brazil) Filipe Luís
- (Brazil) Mauro Silva
- (Brazil) Rivaldo
- (Bulgaria) Ilian Kiriakov
- (Bulgaria) Emil Kostadinov
- (Cameroon) Jacques Songo'o
- (Canada) Julian de Guzman
- (Croatia) Stipe Pletikosa
- (Chile) Bryan Rabello
- (Colombia) Abel Aguilar
- (Colombia) Marlos Moreno
- (Costa Rica) Celso Borges
- (Czech Republic) Petr Kouba
- (Equatorial Guinea) Rodolfo Bodipo
- (Honduras) Héctor Zelaya
- (Israel) Dudu Aouate
- (Japan) Gaku Shibasaki
- (Mexico) Omar Bravo
- (Mexico) Andrés Guardado
- (Morocco) Salaheddine Bassir
- (Morocco) Fayçal Fajr
- (Morocco) Mustapha Hadji
- (Morocco) Noureddine Naybet
- (Netherlands) Ryan Babel
- (Netherlands) Ola John
- (Netherlands) Roy Makaay
- (Nigeria) Peter Rufai
- (Norway) Knut Olav Rindarøy
- (Paraguay) Roberto Acuña
- (Paraguay) Claudio Morel Rodríguez
- (Portugal) Jorge Andrade
- (Portugal) Ivan Cavaleiro
- (Portugal) Zé Castro
- (Portugal) Hélder Cristóvão
- (Portugal) Hélder Postiga
- (Portugal) Nélson Oliveira
- (Portugal) Pizzi
- (Portugal) Pauleta
- (Portugal) Sílvio
- (Poland) Cezary Wilk
- (Poland) Przemysław Tytoń
- (Romania) Florin Andone
- (Russia) Dmitri Radchenko
- (Spain) Amancio Amaro
- (Spain) Juan Acuña
- (Spain) Adolfo Aldana
- (Spain) Álvaro Arbeloa
- (Spain) Ángel Arizmendi
- (Spain) Armando Álvarez
- (Spain) Daniel Aranzubia
- (Spain) Joan Capdevila
- (Spain) Pahiño
- (Spain) Chacho
- (Spain) Claudio Barragán
- (Spain) Donato
- (Spain) Fran
- (Spain) Alberto Lopo
- (Spain) Albert Luque
- (Spain) Javier Manjarín
- (Spain) Pedro Munitis
- (Spain) Fernando Navarro
- (Spain) Álex Bergantiños
- (Spain) Juanfran Moreno
- (Spain) Manolete
- (Spain) Manuel Pablo
- (Spain) José Francisco Molina
- (Spain) Nando
- (Spain) Luis Otero
- (Spain) Pahiño
- (Spain) Pedrito
- (Spain) Enrique Romero
- (Spain) Sergio
- (Spain) Diego Tristán
- (Spain) Juan Carlos Valerón
- (Spain) José Luis Veloso
- (Spain) Víctor Sánchez
- (Spain) Voro
- (Sweden) Christian Wilhelmsson
- (Tunisia) Lassad Nouioui
- (Turkey) Emre Çolak
- (Uruguay) Fabián Estoyanoff
- (Uruguay) Gustavo Munúa
- (Uruguay) Walter Pandiani
- (Uruguay) Jonathan Rodríguez
- (Uruguay) Federico Valverde
- (Federal Republic of Yugoslavia) Miroslav Đukić
- (Federal Republic of Yugoslavia) Slaviša Jokanović
- (Federal Republic of Yugoslavia) Borče Sredojević
- (Federal Republic of Yugoslavia) Goran Đorović

=== World Cup players ===
The following players represented their country at the FIFA World Cup while playing for Deportivo.

- (Spain) Chacho (1934)
- (Spain) Juan Acuña (1950)
- (Brazil) Mauro Silva (1994) (World Cup winner)
- (Brazil) Bebeto (1994) (World Cup winner)
- (Spain) Voro (1994)
- (Morocco) Noureddine Naybet (1998)
- (Morocco) Mustapha Hadji (1998)
- (Morocco) Salaheddine Bassir (1998)
- (Cameroon) Jacques Songo'o (1998)
- (Nigeria) Peter Rufai (1998)
- (Spain) Diego Tristán (2002)
- (Spain) Enrique Romero (2002)
- (Spain) Juan Carlos Valerón (2002)
- (Spain) Sergio (2002)
- (Paraguay) Roberto Acuña (2006)
- (Argentina) Fabricio Coloccini (2006)
- (Mexico) Andrés Guardado (2010)
- (Switzerland) Fabian Schär (2018)
- (Denmark) Michael Krohn-Dehli (2018)
- (Nigeria) Francis Uzoho (2018)
- (Costa Rica) Celso Borges (2018)

== Women's team ==
Real Club Deportivo de A Coruña Femenino is the women's football section of Deportivo which plays in the Liga F, the top tier of Spanish women's football.

=== Honours ===
- Women's Spanish Cup (unofficial) (2): 1981, 1982
- Women's Spanish Cup (3): 1983, 1984, 1985

== Reserve team ==
Real Club Deportivo Fabril is the reserve team of Deportivo de A Coruña. Founded in 1914 as Fabril Sociedad Deportiva, it plays in the Primera Federación, the third tier of Spanish football. Its stadium is called Cidade Deportiva de Abegondo, with a capacity of 1,000 seats.

In 1993, the team was officially renamed Deportivo B, although most locals still called it "Fabril". In 2017, it was renamed back to Real Club Deportivo Fabril.
