= Luis Rodríguez Vaz =

Spanish football manager (born 1942)

Personal information
- Full name: Luis Rodríguez Vaz
- Date of birth: 7 February 1942 (age 84)
- Place of birth: Verín, Spain

Managerial career
- Years: Team
- 1967–1968: Ciudad Jardín
- 1968–1969: Unión Sportiva
- 1969–1971: Deportivo La Coruña (youth)
- 1971–1973: Órdenes
- 1974–1975: Compostela
- 1977–1978: Racing Ferrol
- 1981–1982: Deportivo La Coruña
- 1984–1987: Fabril
- 1987–1988: Deportivo La Coruña
- 1989–1992: As Pontes
- 1992–1993: Lugo
- 1994–1995: Racing Ferrol
- 1996: Racing Ferrol
- 1997–1998: Ourense
- 1998–1999: Ourense
- 1999–2000: Chaves
- 2001–2002: Ourense

Luis Rodríguez Vaz (born 7 February 1942) is a Spanish football manager.

== Manager career ==
Born in Verín, Ourense, Galicia, Rodríguez Vaz was appointed Deportivo de La Coruña in November 1981, after a spell at Racing de Ferrol. In 1987, he returned to Dépor, but was sacked in February of the following year.

In December 1992 Rodríguez Vaz was named CD Lugo manager, with the side struggling in Segunda División. However, after only winning five matches out of 24, he suffered team relegation.

In June 1997, after another spell at Racing, Rodríguez Vaz was appointed at the helm of CD Ourense, narrowly avoiding the drop in the last matchday. He left the club in June 1998, but eventually returned in December.

On 19 November 2001 Rodríguez Vaz was again appointed at the Rojillos, being relieved from his duties at the end of the campaign. He was also manager of SD Compostela, CD As Pontes and G.D. Chaves.
