= Arsenio Iglesias =

Spanish football player and manager (1930–2023)

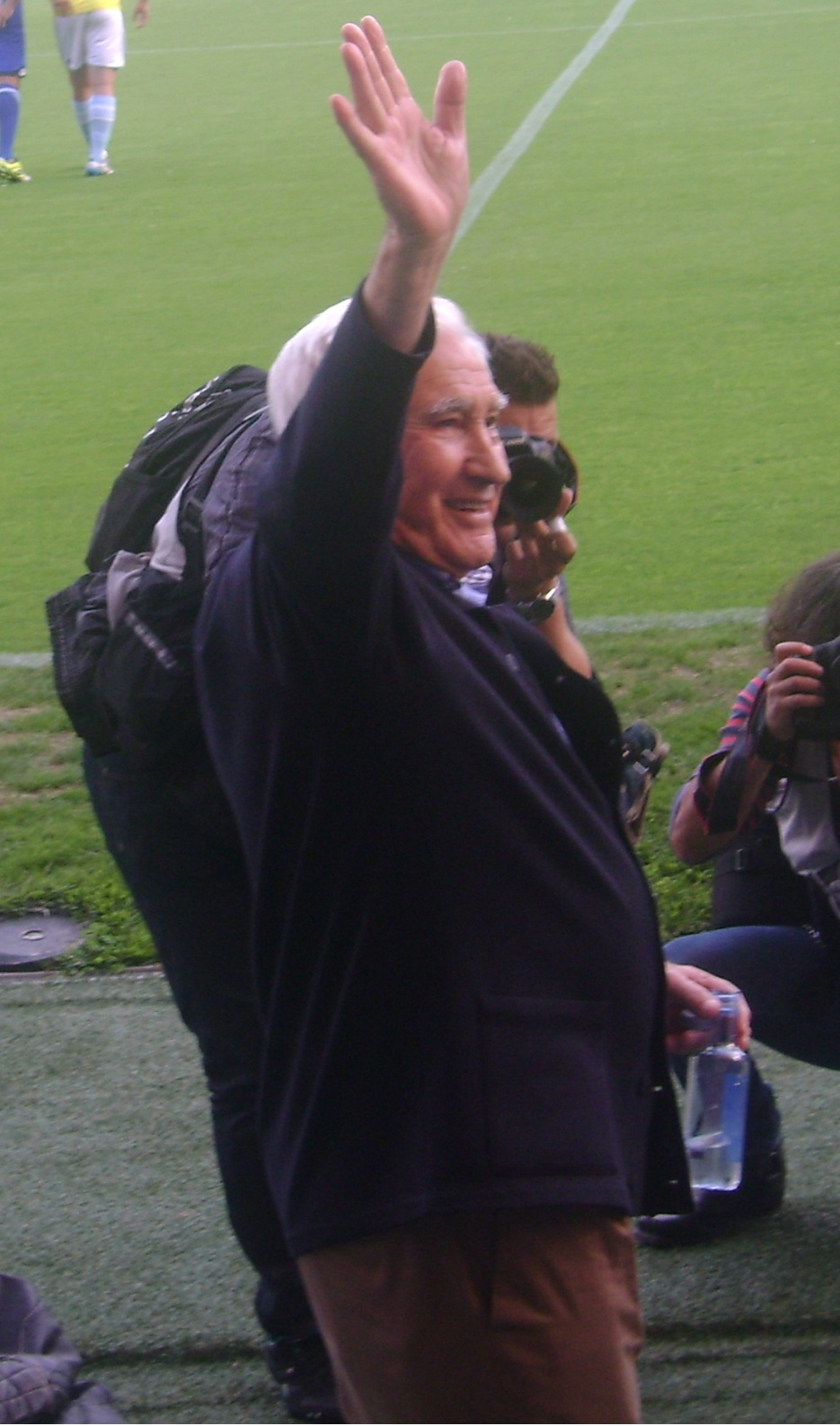
- Iglesias in 2016

Personal information
- Full name: Arsenio Iglesias Pardo
- Date of birth: 24 December 1930
- Place of birth: Arteixo, Spain
- Date of death: 5 May 2023 (aged 92)
- Place of death: A Coruña, Spain
- Height: 1.69 m (5 ft 6 1/2 in)
- Position: Forward

Youth career
- Penouqueira
- Ciudad Jardín
- Bergantiños
- Deportivo La Coruña

Senior career*
Years	Team	Apps	(Gls)
1950–1951	Deportivo Fabril		
1951–1957	Deportivo La Coruña	135	(32)
1957–1958	Sevilla	8	(2)
1958–1964	Granada	111	(22)
1964–1965	Oviedo	37	(6)
1965–1966	Albacete		
Total		291	(62)

Managerial career
- 1967–1970: Deportivo Fabril
- 1971–1973: Deportivo La Coruña
- 1973–1977: Hércules
- 1977–1978: Zaragoza
- 1978–1979: Burgos
- 1979–1980: Elche
- 1980: Almería
- 1982–1985: Deportivo La Coruña
- 1986–1987: Compostela
- 1988–1991: Deportivo La Coruña
- 1992–1995: Deportivo La Coruña
- 1996: Real Madrid
- 2005–2008: Galicia
- * Club domestic league appearances and goals

Arsenio Iglesias Pardo (24 December 1930 – 5 May 2023) was a Spanish football player and manager.

Nicknamed O Bruxo de Arteixo ("The Wizard of Arteixo"), he had a five-decade professional career closely associated to Deportivo as both a player and manager.

== Playing career ==
Born in Arteixo, Province of A Coruña, Iglesias played as a forward and started his career with local side Deportivo de La Coruña. He made his La Liga debut on 28 October 1951 in a 6–1 away loss against FC Barcelona, and scored the following weekend against RCD Español (3–1 home win).

Iglesias netted seven goals in three separate seasons for the Galicians, adding a career-best eight in 1956–57, which nonetheless ended in relegation. In six of the following eight years he also played in the top division, representing Sevilla FC, Granada CF and Real Oviedo; he amassed competition totals of 238 games and 50 goals, and retired at 35 after a spell in the lower leagues with Albacete Balompié.

== Coaching career ==
Iglesias started coaching one year after retiring, his first appointment being at Deportivo's reserves, which he accumulated with assistant duties in the main squad. Midway through the 1970–71 campaign he was named the first team's manager, leading them to a top-flight promotion and being relegated in 1973.

In 1973–74, Iglesias repeated the feat with another Segunda División side, Hércules CF, then remained at the club's helm for a further three years, always managing to comfortably stay afloat – this included a fifth place in 1975 and a sixth in 1976. In the 1977–78 season another promotion to the main division befell, this time as champions with Real Zaragoza.

Iglesias worked in the top tier in two of the next three seasons, leading Burgos CF to the 13th position in 1978–79 and being fired by AD Almería midway through the 1980–81 campaign amid several internal disputes. In 1982 he returned to Deportivo, with the club in division two.

In 1987–88, Iglesias was one of three coaches as Depor nearly suffered relegation to Segunda División B, being saved by a last-minute goal against Racing de Santander. He was again reinstated as first-team manager, finally attaining promotion to the first division in 1991 after ranking second.

Iglesias replaced the dismissed Marco Antonio Boronat at the club's helm late in 1991–92, as Deportivo had to play a relegation playoff against Real Betis, eventually winning 2–1 on aggregate. In the following seasons, however, Super Depor came to fruition, with several team players winning individual accolades and being called to the Spain national team as the side finished three consecutive campaigns in the top three; during this timeframe, he was named Manager of the Year three times, twice by Don Balón and once by El País.

Iglesias retired from football after 1994–95. Midway through the following campaign, however, he accepted an offer from Real Madrid to replace the fired Jorge Valdano, with the Merengues eventually ranking sixth and being eliminated in the quarter-finals of the UEFA Champions League by eventual winners Juventus FC.

In 2005, Iglesias was appointed manager of the Galicia national team, working alongside Fernando Vázquez. In the previous decade, he also worked as a sports commentator.

In 2016, Iglesias was bestowed with the highest recognition of Deportivo, a special insignia, and was declared "Blue and White Legend". The event took place at halftime of the last game of the 2015–16 season, at the Estadio Riazor.

== Death ==
Iglesias died in A Coruña on 5 May 2023, at age 92.

== Honours ==
=== Manager ===
Zaragoza

- Segunda División: 1977–78

Deportivo

- Copa del Rey: 1994–95
