= 2024–25 Deportivo de La Coruña season =

Deportivo de La Coruña
2024–25 season
- Head coach: Imanol Idiakez (until 28 October); Óscar Gilsanz (acting) (31 October - 5 November); Óscar Gilsanz (from 5 November)
- Stadium: Estadio Riazor
- Segunda División: 15th
- Copa del Rey: Second round vs Ourense
- Top goalscorer: League: Yeremay Hernández (15); All: Yeremay Hernández (15)
- Highest home attendance: 26,452 (vs Racing de Ferrol, 1 September 2024, Segunda División)
- Lowest home attendance: 16,890 (vs Castellón, 19 December 2024, Segunda División)
- Average home league attendance: 21,571
- Biggest win: 5–1 (vs. Cartagena (A), 2 November 2024, Segunda División); 5–1 (vs. Castellón (H), 19 December 2024, Segunda División)
- Biggest defeat: 0–4 (vs. Mirandés (H), 22 December 2024, Segunda División)
Home colours	Away colours	Third colours

The 2024–25 season was the 118th season in the history of the Deportivo de La Coruña, and the club's first season in the Segunda División since 2020. In addition to the domestic league, the team is scheduled to participate in the Copa del Rey.

== Season events ==
On 26 August, Deportivo announced the signing of Charlie Patino on a contract until 30 June 2028.

On 28 October, Imanol Idiakez was sacked as the club's head coach, with Óscar Gilsanz being appointed in a temporary role on 31 October, before being announced as the club's permanent head coach on 5 November.

On 22 January, Lucas Pérez was released by Deportivo, citing personal reasons.

== Squad ==
As of 3 February 2025

=== First-team ===
Note: Flags indicate national team as defined under FIFA eligibility rules; some limited exceptions apply. Players may hold more than one non-FIFA nationality.

No.	Pos.	Nation	Player
1	GK	ESP	Germán Parreño
2	MF	AUS	Denis Genreau
3	FW	NED	Zakaria Eddahchouri
4	DF	FRA	Pablo Martinez
5	DF	ESP	Dani Barcia
6	DF	ESP	Álex Petxarroman
7	FW	ESP	Diego Gómez
8	MF	ESP	Diego Villares (captain)
9	FW	ESP	Iván Barbero
10	FW	ESP	Yeremay Hernández
11	DF	SRB	Nemanja Tošić (on loan from Zürich)
12	MF	COD	Omenuke Mfulu
14	FW	ESP	Cristian Herrera

No.	Pos.	Nation	Player
15	DF	ESP	Pablo Vázquez
16	FW	ARG	Juan Gauto (on loan from Basel)
17	FW	ESP	David Mella
18	DF	ESP	Sergio Escudero
19	DF	ESP	Jaime Sánchez
20	MF	ESP	José Ángel
21	MF	ESP	Mario Soriano
22	MF	ESP	Hugo Rama
23	DF	ESP	Ximo Navarro
24	FW	MAR	Mohamed Bouldini
25	GK	BRA	Helton Leite
28	MF	ENG	Charlie Patino
33	DF	ESP	Rafael Obrador (on loan from Real Madrid)

=== Reserve team ===
Note: Flags indicate national team as defined under FIFA eligibility rules; some limited exceptions apply. Players may hold more than one non-FIFA nationality.

No.	Pos.	Nation	Player
26	GK	ESP	Alberto Sánchez
29	DF	ESP	Samu Fernández
30	FW	ESP	Adrián Guerrero
31	DF	ESP	Pablo García

No.	Pos.	Nation	Player
32	FW	ESP	Kevin Sánchez
35	DF	ESP	Aarón Sánchez
37	MF	ESP	Álex Alfaro

=== Out on loan ===
Note: Flags indicate national team as defined under FIFA eligibility rules; some limited exceptions apply. Players may hold more than one non-FIFA nationality.

No.	Pos.	Nation	Player
—	GK	ESP	Eric Puerto (at Marbella until 30 June 2025)
—	DF	GBS	Iano Simão (at Arenteiro until 30 June 2025)
—	MF	ESP	Rubén López (at Barcelona Atlètic until 30 June 2025)
—	MF	ESP	Pablo Muñoz (at Marbella until 30 June 2025)

No.	Pos.	Nation	Player
—	FW	ESP	Raúl Alcaina (at Murcia until 30 June 2025)
—	FW	ESP	Luis Chacón (at Cultural Leonesa until 30 June 2025)
—	FW	ESP	Davo (at Murcia until 30 June 2025)
—	FW	ESP	Martín Ochoa (at Lugo until 30 June 2025)

== Transfers ==
=== In ===
Start date	Position	Nationality	Name	From	End date	Ref.
1 July 2024	MF	(Spain)	Davo	Eupen	Undisclosed	
12 July 2024	FW	(Spain)	Luis Chacón	CD Arenteiro	Free	
15 July 2024	DF	(Spain)	Álex Petxarroman	FC Andorra	Undisclosed	
26 August 2024	MF	(England)	Charlie Patino	Arsenal	Undisclosed	
30 January 2025	FW	(Netherlands)	Zakaria Eddahchouri	Telstar	Undisclosed	
31 January 2025	MF	(Australia)	Denis Genreau	Toulouse	Undisclosed	

=== Loans in ===
Start date	Position	Nationality	Name	From	End date	Ref.
3 February 2025	DF	(Serbia)	Nemanja Tošić	Zürich	End of season	

=== Out ===
Start date	Position	Nationality	Name	To	End date	Ref.
1 July 2024	DF	(Spain)	Mikel Balenziaga	Retired		
1 July 2024	MF	(Spain)	Salva Sevilla			
1 July 2024	GK	(Spain)	Pablo Brea	UD San Sebastián de los Reyes	Undisclosed	

=== Loans out ===
Start date	Position	Nationality	Name	To	End date	Ref.
22 January 2025	GK	(Spain)	Eric Puerto	Marbella	14 February 2025	
3 February 2025	FW	(Spain)	David Álvarez	Real Murcia	End of season	

=== Released ===
Date	Position	Nationality	Name	Joined	Date	Ref
22 January 2025	FW	(Spain)	Lucas Pérez	PSV Eindhoven	23 February 2025	

== Friendlies ==
=== Pre-season ===
On 10 July, Depor began pre-season training, with the first test match scheduled to take place on July 23 against Ourense, which was newly promoted to the third division.

23 July 2024 Friendly	Ourense CF	0–4	Deportivo La Coruña	Ourense
20:00 UTC+2		Report	Hernández 20'; Soriano 26', 86'; Barbero 30'	Stadium: Estadio de O Couto

27 July 2024 Friendly	Pontevedra	0–2	Deportivo La Coruña	Pontevedra
20:00 UTC+2	Fontán (yellow card) 44'		Villares 37'; Rama 80'	Stadium: Estadio Municipal de Pasarón; Referee: Gómez Lameiro

30 July 2024 Friendly	Famalicão	2–2	Deportivo La Coruña	Portugal
19:30 UTC+1

31 July 2024 Friendly	Gil Vicente	0–0	Deportivo La Coruña	Portugal
19:30 UTC+1

3 August 2024 Friendly	Chaves	2–0	Deportivo La Coruña	Portugal
18:00 UTC+1

== Competitions ==
=== Overall record ===
Competition	First match	Last match	Starting round	Final position	Record							
Competition	First match	Last match	Starting round	Final position	Pld	W	D	L	GF	GA	GD	Win %
Segunda División	17 August 2024	1 June 2025	Matchday 1	15th	42	13	14	15	56	54	+2	30.95
Copa del Rey	4 December 2024	4 December 2024	Second round	Second round	1	0	0	1	0	1	−1	0.00
Total					43	13	14	16	56	55	+1	30.23

Last updated: 1 June 2025
Source: Soccerway

=== Segunda División ===
==== League table ====
Pos	Team	Pld	W	D	L	GF	GA	GD	Pts
13	Cádiz	42	14	13	15	55	53	+2	55 (Note: Burgos finished ahead of Cádiz and Córdoba on head-to-head points: Burgos 6 pts, Cádiz 5 pts, Córdoba 4 pts.)
14	Córdoba	42	14	13	15	59	63	−4	55
15	Deportivo La Coruña	42	13	14	15	56	54	+2	53 (Note: Deportivo La Coruña finished ahead of Málaga and Castellón on head-to-head points: Deportivo La Coruña 6 pts, Málaga 5 pts, Castellón 4 pts.)
16	Málaga	42	12	17	13	42	46	−4	53
17	Castellón	42	14	11	17	65	63	+2	53

Source: LaLiga Hypermotion
Rules for classification: 1) Points; 2) Head-to-head points; 3) Head-to-head goal difference; 4) Goal difference; 5) Goals scored; 6) Fair-play points
(Note: Head-to-head record is used only after all the matches between the teams in question have been played)

==== Results summary ====
Overall								Home						Away					
Pld	W	D	L	GF	GA	GD	Pts	W	D	L	GF	GA	GD	W	D	L	GF	GA	GD
42	13	14	15	56	54	+2	53	6	8	7	26	27	−1	7	6	8	30	27	+3

Last updated: 1 June 2025.

==== Results by round ====
Round	1	2	3	4	5	6	7	8	9	10	11	12	13	14	15	16	17	18	20	21	22	23	24	19	25	26	27	28	29	30	31	32	33	34	35	36	37	38	39	40	41	42
Ground	H	A	H	A	A	H	A	H	A	H	A	H	A	H	A	H	A	H	H	H	A	A	H	A	A	H	A	H	A	H	A	A	H	H	A	H	A	H	A	H	A	H
Result	L	L	W	D	L	L	W	D	D	D	L	L	W	W	L	D	W	D	W	L	D	W	L	D	W	W	L	D	W	D	D	D	W	W	D	D	L	W	L	L	L	L
Position	19	19	15	15	19	19	18	19	17	18	19	20	17	15	17	18	15	15	16	15	17	17	15	16	12	10	12	13	10	11	12	14	12	11	11	11	12	10	12	13	15	15

Updated to match(es) played on 1 June 2025. Source:
A = Away; H = Home; W = Win; D = Draw; L = Loss

==== Matches ====
The match schedule was released on 26 June 2024.

17 August 2024 1	Deportivo de La Coruña	0–1	Real Oviedo	A Coruña
19:00 CET (UTC+2)	Martinez (yellow card) 22'; Ángel (yellow card) 31'; Soriano (yellow card) 31'	Report	del Moral 5'; Dotor (yellow card) 25'; Moyano (yellow card) 28'; Sibo (yellow card) 30'; Ahijado (yellow card) 51'	Stadium: Estadio Riazor; Attendance: 25,715; Referee: Salvador Lax Franco

23 August 2024 2	Huesca	2–1	Deportivo de La Coruña	Huesca
21:30 CET (UTC+2)	Sielva 39' (pen.) (yellow card) 90'; Mier (yellow card) 51'; Vilarrasa (yellow card) 61'; Pérez (yellow card) 63'; Blasco 90+3'	Report	Navarro 54'	Stadium: Estadio El Alcoraz; Attendance: 6,172; Referee: Iosu Galech Apezteguia

1 September 2024 3	Deportivo de La Coruña	1–0	Racing de Ferrol	A Coruña
17:00 CET (UTC+2)	Navarro (yellow card) 45+3'; Yeremay 55'; Soriano (yellow card) 81'; Obrador (yellow card) 90+5'	Report	Chiki (yellow card) 47'	Stadium: Estadio Riazor; Attendance: 26,452; Referee: Damaso Archdeacon Monescillo

7 September 2024 4	Granada	1–1	Deportivo de La Coruña	Granada
16:15 CET (UTC+2)	Martinez 17' (pen.); Williams (yellow card) 32'; Sáenz (yellow card) 60'; Ri.Sánchez (yellow card) 70'	Report	Pérez 48'	Stadium: Los Cármenes; Attendance: 15,308; Referee: German Cid Camacho

13 September 2024 5	Córdoba	2–0	Deportivo de La Coruña	Córdoba
20:30 CET (UTC+2)	Yoldi (yellow card) 22'; Carracedo 43'; Lapeña (yellow card) 86'; Genaro (yellow card) 90+4'; Yoldi 98' (pen.)	Report	Barbero (yellow card) 67'; Pérez (yellow card) 90+4'	Stadium: Estadio Nuevo Arcángel; Attendance: 16,435; Referee: Eder Mallo Fernandez

21 September 2024 6	Deportivo de La Coruña	0–2	Burgos	A Coruña
18:30 CET (UTC+2)	Navarro (yellow card) 68'	Report	Miguel (yellow card) 86'; Sancris 88'; C.Sánchez 90+7' (pen.)	Stadium: Estadio Riazor; Attendance: 22,533; Referee: Miguel Sesma Espinosa

27 September 2024 7	Albacete Balompié	2–5	Deportivo de La Coruña	Albacete
20:30 CET (UTC+2)	Quiles 4'; Riki (yellow card) 36'; Medina (yellow card) 37'; Fidel (yellow card) 60' (goal) 76'	Report	Mella 9', 80'; Yeremay 12', 61'; Barcia (yellow card) 14'; Obrador (yellow card) 17'; Herrera 74'	Stadium: Carlos Belmonte; Attendance: 11,509; Referee: Jose Luis Guzman Mansilla

6 October 2024 8	Deportivo de La Coruña	0–0	Málaga	A Coruña
14:00 CET (UTC+2)		Report	Ochoa (yellow card) 55'	Stadium: Estadio Riazor; Attendance: 21,346; Referee: Muniz Munoz

13 October 2025 9	Elche	0–0	Deportivo de La Coruña	Elche
21:00 CET (UTC+2)	Febas (yellow card) 65'; Salinas (yellow card) 85'	Report	Bouldini (yellow card) 80'; Ángel (yellow card) 89'	Stadium: Estadio Martínez Valero; Attendance: 15,810; Referee: Ruben Avalos Barrier

19 October 2024 10	Deportivo de La Coruña	1–1	Eldense	A Coruña
16:15 CET (UTC+2)	Bouldini 26'; Obrador (yellow card) 68'; Barcia (yellow card) 71'; Pérez (yellow card) 87'	Report	Jorquera 8' (yellow card) 51'; Timor (yellow card) 24'; Martos (yellow card) 51'; Mackay (yellow card) 90+5'	Stadium: Estadio Riazor; Attendance: 21,198; Referee: Iosu Galech Apezteguia

24 October 2024 11	Levante	2–1	Deportivo de La Coruña	Valencia
19:00 CET (UTC+2)	Romero 7', 28'; Clemente (yellow card) 90+5'; Kochorashvili (yellow card) 90+8'	Report	Obrador (yellow card) 43'; Petxarroman (yellow card) 47'; Barbero 88'	Stadium: Estadi Ciutat de València; Attendance: 13,562; Referee: Rafael Sanchez Lopez

27 October 2024 12	Deportivo de La Coruña	1–2	Racing de Santander	A Coruña
16:15 CET (UTC+1)	Barcia (yellow card) 9'; Navarro (yellow card) 50'; Yeremay 65'	Report	Rodríguez 18'; Arana 23'	Stadium: Estadio Riazor; Attendance: 22,978; Referee: Jon Ander Gonzalez Esteban

2 November 2024 13	Cartagena	1–5	Deportivo de La Coruña	Cartagena
16:15 CET (UTC+1)	Muñoz (yellow card) 37'; Barcia 69' (o.g.); Musto (yellow card) 82'	Report	Yeremay 6', 89'; Navarro 25'; Barbero 48'; J.Sánchez (yellow card) 56'; Herrera 88'	Stadium: Estadio Cartagonova; Attendance: 6,862; Referee: Jose Luis Guzman Mansilla

11 November 2024 14	Deportivo de La Coruña	1–0	Eibar	A Coruña
20:30 CET (UTC+1)	Obrador (yellow card) 80'; Soriano 90+1'	Report	Guruzeta (yellow card) 75'; Carrillo (yellow card) 90+3'	Stadium: Estadio Riazor; Attendance: 19,980; Referee: Jose Antonio Sanchez Villalobos

17 November 2025 15	Almería	2–1	Deportivo de La Coruña	Almería
18:30 CET (UTC+1)	González 31'; Baptistão 45+1'	Report	Vázquez 35'; Barcia (yellow card) 72'	Stadium: UD Almería Stadium; Attendance: 12,814; Referee: Sergiu Claudiu Muresan

24 November 2024 16	Deportivo de La Coruña	1–1	Sporting Gijón	A Coruña
16:15 CET (UTC+1)	Mella 84'; Pérez (yellow card) 90'	Report	Rosas (yellow card) 29'; Méndez 77'	Stadium: Estadio Riazor; Attendance: 25,619; Referee: Manuel Angel Perez Hernandez

30 November 2024 17	Cádiz	2–4	Deportivo de La Coruña	Cádiz
18:30 CET (UTC+1)	Á.Fernández 40', 66' (pen.) (yellow card) 66'; Chust (yellow card) 53'; Sobrino (yellow card) 59'; Alcaraz (yellow card) 73'; Glauder (yellow card) 82'	Report	Mella (yellow card) 3' (yellow-red card) 78'; Kovačević 35' (o.g.); Pérez 57', 81', 84' (yellow card) 90+11'; Leite (yellow card) 63'	Stadium: Nuevo Mirandilla; Referee: Salvador Lax Franco

7 December 2024 18	Deportivo de La Coruña	1–1	Real Zaragoza	A Coruña
18:30 CET (UTC+1)	Soriano 7' (yellow card) 8'; Martinez (yellow card) 67'; Mfulu (yellow card) 74'; Leite (yellow card) 89'; Pérez (yellow card) 89'	Report	Bare (yellow card) 20'; Amador (yellow card) 34'; Aguado (yellow card) 65'; Serrano 90+2'	Stadium: Estadio Riazor; Attendance: 24,257; Referee: Oliver de la Fuente Ramos

19 December 2024 20	Deportivo de La Coruña	5–1	Castellón	A Coruña
21:15 CET (UTC+1)	Mella 36', 39'; Villares 45'; Barbero 49'; Yeremay 52' (pen.); Vázquez (yellow card) 77'	Report	Aurélio 7' (yellow card) 29'; Mamah (yellow card) 57'	Stadium: Estadio Riazor; Attendance: 16,890; Referee: Miguel Sesma Espinosa

22 December 2024 21	Deportivo de La Coruña	0–4	Mirandés	A Coruña
21:00 CET (UTC+1)	Barbero (yellow card) 53'; Villares (red card) 77'	Report	Izeta 36' (pen.), 55', 63'; Roca 40'; Rincón (yellow card) 45+2'; Gutiérrez (yellow card) 54'; Calvo (yellow card) 90+2'	Stadium: Estadio Riazor; Attendance: 23,812; Referee: Andres Fuentes Molina

11 January 2025 22	Málaga	1–1	Deportivo de La Coruña	Málaga
18:30 CET (UTC+1)	Gabilondo (yellow card) 8'; Kevin (yellow card) 39'; Chupete 87'	Report	Mfulu (yellow card) 24'; Yeremay 67'	Stadium: La Rosaleda; Attendance: 27,281; Referee: Damaso Archdeacon Monescillo

19 January 2025 23	Burgos	0–1	Deportivo de La Coruña	Burgos
14:00 CET (UTC+1)	Morante (yellow card) 65'; C.Sánchez (yellow card) 72'; A.Córdoba (yellow card) 79'; Miguel (yellow card) 90+6'	Report	Navarro (yellow card) 13'; Mfulu (yellow card) 50'; Soriano 69'	Stadium: Estadio El Plantío; Attendance: 11,050; Referee: Saul Ais Reig

25 January 2025 24	Deportivo de La Coruña	1–2	Levante	A Coruña
18:30 CET (UTC+1)	Ángel (yellow card) 19'; Martinez (yellow card) 74'; Villares 82'	Report	Elgezabal (yellow card) 20' de la Fuente (yellow card) 62'; Lozano (yellow card) 68'; Álvarez 51'; Morales 84'; Rey (yellow card) 90+3'	Stadium: Estadio Riazor; Attendance: 22,397; Referee: Manuel Jesus Orellana Cid

29 January 2025 19	Tenerife	0–0	Deportivo de La Coruña	Santa Cruz de Tenerife
21:00 CET (UTC+1)	Mesa (yellow card) 66'	Report	Yeremay (penalty missed) 12'; Bouldini (yellow card) 27'; Petxarroman (yellow card) 40'	Stadium: Estadio Heliodoro Rodríguez López; Attendance: 11,214; Referee: Jose Luis Guzman Mansilla

2 February 2025 25	Eibar	0–1	Deportivo de La Coruña	Eibar
16:15 CET (UTC+1)	Bautista (yellow card) 90+2'	Report	Navarro 30'	Stadium: Ipurua Municipal Stadium; Attendance: 6,102; Referee: Manuel Angel Perez Hernandez

9 February 2025 26	Deportivo de La Coruña	3–1	Almería	A Coruña
18:30 CET (UTC+1)	Eddahchouri 19' (yellow card) 61'; Yeremay 26'; Mella 31'; Ángel (yellow card) 50'	Report	Lopy (yellow card) 45'; Suárez (yellow card) 75' (goal) 90+3'; Puigmal (yellow card) 88'	Stadium: Estadio Riazor; Attendance: 22,217; Referee: Miguel Sesma Espinosa

16 February 2025 27	Eldense	2–0	Deportivo de La Coruña	Elda
16:15 CET (UTC+1)	Masca 58' (pen.); Llabrés 65'	Report	Vázquez (yellow card) 57'	Stadium: Nuevo Pepico Amat; Attendance: 4,718; Referee: Daniel Palencia Knight

23 February 2025 28	Deportivo de La Coruña	0–0	Huesca	A Coruña
14:00 CET (UTC+1)	Villares (yellow card) 24'	Report	Jiménez (yellow card) 76'; Martín (yellow card) 80'; Loureiro (yellow card) 87'; Sielva (yellow card) 90'	Stadium: Estadio Riazor; Attendance: 20,714; Referee: Damaso Archdeacon Monescillo

2 March 2025 29	Real Oviedo	1–2	Deportivo de La Coruña	Oviedo
16:15 CET (UTC+1)	Chaira (yellow card) 28' (goal) 38'; Colombatto (yellow card) 61'; Viñas (yellow card) 77'	Report	Soriano 23' (yellow card) 37'; Yeremay (yellow card) 76'; Navarro 90+1'	Stadium: Estadio Carlos Tartiere; Attendance: 25,081; Referee: Sergiu Claudiu Muresan

7 March 2025 30	Deportivo de La Coruña	1–1	Córdoba	A Coruña
21:00 CET (UTC+1)	Villares (yellow card) 11'; Eddahchouri 61'	Report	Albarrán (yellow card) 17'; Sala 50'; Alves (yellow card) 58'; Calderón (yellow card) 89'	Stadium: Estadio Riazor; Attendance: 20,475; Referee: Miguel Gonzalez Diaz

17 March 2025 31	Castellón	2–2	Deportivo de La Coruña	Castellón de la Plana
20:30 CET (UTC+1)	Suero 14'; Mabil (yellow card) 22'; Vertrouwd 47'; Chirino (yellow card) 63' van den Belt (yellow card) 72'; Sánchez (yellow card) 90+3'	Report	Yeremay 6'; Vázquez 57'; Barcia (yellow card) 80'	Stadium: Nou Estadi Castàlia; Attendance: 9,203; Referee: Salvador Lax Franco

23 March 2025 32	Deportivo de La Coruña	2–2	Cartagena	A Coruña
18:30 CET (UTC+1)	Navarro (red card) 7'; Villares (yellow card) 54' (goal) 69'; Barbero 86'	Report	Hernández (yellow card) 40'; Andy (yellow card) 45' (goal) 59'; Aguirregabiria (yellow card) 45+1'; El Jebari 76'	Stadium: Estadio Riazor; Attendance: 21,315; Referee: Muñiz Muñoz

29 March 2025 33	Racing de Ferrol	0–1	Deportivo de La Coruña	Ferrol
15:15 CET (UTC+1)	Castro (yellow card) 61'; Jauregi (yellow card) 74'; Purić (yellow card) 80'; Buñuel (yellow card) 88'	Report	Yeremay 18'; Petxarroman (yellow card) 65'	Stadium: A Malata; Attendance: 8,778; Referee: Jon Ander González Esteban

6 April 2025 34	Deportivo de La Coruña	1–0	Cádiz	A Coruña
21:00 CEST (UTC+2)	Soriano 81'	Report		Stadium: Estadio Riazor; Attendance: 19,867; Referee: Ruben Avalos Barrera

13 April 2025 35	Mirandés	2–2	Deportivo de La Coruña	Miranda de Ebro
18:30 CEST (UTC+2)	Lachuer (penalty missed) 37'; Postigo (yellow card) 42'; Roca 53'; Panichelli 63' (pen.); Butzke (yellow card) 76'; Rincón (yellow card) 80'; Egiluz (yellow card) 90'	Report	Villares 3'; Ángel (yellow card) 4'; Tošić (yellow card) 18'; Mfulu (yellow card) 69'; Barbero (yellow card) 83'; Yeremay 90+1' (pen.)	Stadium: Estadio Municipal de Anduva; Attendance: 4,602; Referee: Sergiu Claudiu Muresan

20 April 2025 36	Deportivo de La Coruña	0–0	Tenerife	A Coruña
21:00 CEST (UTC+2)	Petxarroman (yellow card) 43'; Vázquez (yellow card) 59'	Report	Cruz (yellow card) 40'; Gallego (yellow card) 70'	Stadium: Estadio Riazor; Attendance: 20,994; Referee: Óliver de la Fuente Ramos

27 April 2025 37	Racing de Santander	2–1	Deportivo de La Coruña	Santander
16:15 CEST (UTC+2)	Castro 8'; Karrikaburu 45+2'; Gueye (yellow card) 45+4'	Report	Gómez (yellow card) 41'; Mfulu (yellow card) 69'; Martinez (yellow card) 73'; Genreau 86' (red card) 90+3'; Vázquez (yellow card) 90'	Stadium: El Sardinero; Attendance: 22,187; Referee: Manuel Jesús Orellana Cid

4 May 2025 38	Deportivo de La Coruña	5–1	Albacete Balompié	A Coruña
21:00 CEST (UTC+2)	Yeremay 28', 34'; Eddahchouri 46', 62'; Barbero 75'	Report	J.Sánchez 30' (o.g.); Rueda (yellow card) 34'; Medina (yellow card) 90+2'	Stadium: Estadio Riazor; Attendance: 15,340; Referee: Andrés Fuentes Molina

10 May 2025 39	Sporting Gijón	2–1	Deportivo de La Coruña	Gijón
16:15 CEST (UTC+2)	Serrano 17'; Méndez 45'; Olaetxea (yellow card) 45+1'; Gelabert (yellow card) 77'	Report	Yeremay (yellow card) 45+1'; Barbero 61'	Stadium: El Molinón; Attendance: 20,782; Referee: José Luis Guzmán Mansilla

17 May 2025 40	Deportivo de La Coruña	2–3	Granada	A Coruña
16:15 CEST (UTC+2)	Patino (yellow card) 64'; Barbero 71' (red card) 90+7'; Yeremay 90+1'	Report	Rebbach 9'; Tsitaishvili 28'; Trigueros 72'; Ricard (yellow card) 89'; Jóźwiak (yellow card) 90+3'	Stadium: Estadio Riazor; Attendance: 19,572; Referee: Rafael Sánchez López

25 May 2025 41	Real Zaragoza	1–0	Deportivo de La Coruña	Zaragoza
18:30 CEST (UTC+2)	Adu Ares (yellow card) 43'; Sans (yellow card) 50'; Patino 56' (o.g.); Soberón (yellow card) 68'; Luna (yellow card) 73'	Report	J.Sánchez (yellow card) 15'	Stadium: La Romareda; Attendance: 24,007; Referee: Eder Mallo Fernández

1 June 2025 42	Deportivo de La Coruña	0–4	Elche	A Coruña
18:30 CEST (UTC+2)	Escudero (yellow card) 20'; Gómez (yellow card) 37'	Report	Mourad 4'; John 25'; Valera 32'; Febas (yellow card) 33'; Bigas (yellow card) 78' (goal) 89'	Stadium: Estadio Riazor; Attendance: 19,329; Referee: Miguel Sesma Espinosa

=== Copa del Rey ===
4 December 2024 Second round	Ourense	1–0	Deportivo La Coruña	Ourense
20:00 CET (UTC+1)	Ramos (yellow card) 12' del Olmo (yellow card) 56'; Sánchez (yellow card) 75' (goal) 87'	Report	Hugo (yellow card) 25'	Stadium: Estadio O Couto; Attendance: 5,100; Referee: Manuel Jesús Orellana Cid

== Squad statistics ==
As of match played 1 June 2025

=== Appearances and goals ===
No.	Pos	Nat	Player	Total		Segunda División		Copa del Rey	
No.	Pos	Nat	Player	Apps	Goals	Apps	Goals	Apps	Goals
1	GK	(Spain) ESP	Germán Parreño	6	0	5	0	1	0
2	MF	(Australia) AUS	Denis Genreau	9	1	2+7	1	0	0
3	FW	(Netherlands) NED	Zakaria Eddahchouri	16	4	13+3	4	0	0
4	DF	(France) FRA	Pablo Martinez	28	0	22+5	0	1	0
5	DF	(Spain) ESP	Dani Barcia	16	0	16	0	0	0
6	DF	(Spain) ESP	Álex Petxarroman	28	0	17+10	0	1	0
7	FW	(Spain) ESP	Diego Gómez	17	0	6+11	0	0	0
8	MF	(Spain) ESP	Diego Villares	41	4	35+5	4	0+1	0
9	MF	(Spain) ESP	Iván Barbero	37	7	19+18	7	0	0
10	FW	(Spain) ESP	Yeremay Hernández	39	15	35+4	15	0	0
11	DF	(Serbia) SRB	Nemanja Tošić	7	0	4+3	0	0	0
12	MF	(Democratic Republic of the Congo) COD	Omenuke Mfulu	24	0	14+10	0	0	0
14	MF	(Spain) ESP	Cristian Herrera	26	2	4+21	2	1	0
15	DF	(Spain) ESP	Pablo Vázquez	42	2	41+1	2	0	0
16	FW	(Argentina) ARG	Juan Gauto	16	0	2+13	0	1	0
17	MF	(Spain) ESP	David Mella	35	6	32+2	6	0+1	0
18	DF	(Spain) ESP	Sergio Escudero	14	0	7+7	0	0	0
19	DF	(Spain) ESP	Jaime Sánchez	17	0	5+11	0	1	0
20	MF	(Spain) ESP	José Ángel	28	0	23+5	0	0	0
21	MF	(Spain) ESP	Mario Soriano	43	5	39+3	5	0+1	0
22	MF	(Spain) ESP	Hugo Rama	16	0	1+14	0	1	0
23	DF	(Spain) ESP	Ximo Navarro	30	4	29+1	4	0	0
24	FW	(Morocco) MAR	Mohamed Bouldini	20	1	6+14	1	0	0
25	GK	(Brazil) BRA	Helton Leite	37	0	37	0	0	0
28	MF	(England) ENG	Charlie Patino	8	0	3+4	0	1	0
30	FW	(Spain) ESP	Adrián Guerrero	2	0	2	0	0	0
32	FW	(Spain) ESP	Kevin Sánchez	4	0	1+3	0	0	0
33	DF	(Spain) ESP	Rafael Obrador	34	0	24+9	0	1	0
35	DF	(Spain) ESP	Aarón Sánchez	1	0	0	0	0+1	0
37	MF	(Spain) ESP	Álex Alfaro	2	0	0+1	0	1	0
Players away from Deportivo de La Coruña on loan:
11	FW	(Spain) ESP	Davo	10	0	0+9	0	1	0
24	FW	(Spain) ESP	Luis Chacón	1	0	0+1	0	0	0
Players who left Deportivo de La Coruña during the season:
7	FW	(Spain) ESP	Lucas Pérez	20	4	18+1	4	0+1	0

=== Goal scorers ===
Place	Position	Nation	Number	Name	Segunda División	Copa del Rey	Total
1	FW	(Spain)	10	Yeremay Hernández	15	0	15
2	FW	(Spain)	9	Iván Barbero	7	0	7
3	MF	(Spain)	17	David Mella	6	0	6
4	MF	(Spain)	21	Mario Soriano	5	0	5
5	FW	(Spain)	7	Lucas Pérez	4	0	4
5	DF	(Spain)	23	Ximo Navarro	4	0	4
5	FW	(Netherlands)	3	Zakaria Eddahchouri	4	0	4
5	MF	(Spain)	8	Diego Villares	4	0	4
9	FW	(Spain)	14	Cristian Herrera	2	0	2
9	DF	(Spain)	15	Pablo Vázquez	2	0	2
11	FW	(Morocco)	24	Mohamed Bouldini	1	0	1
11	MF	(Australia)	2	Denis Genreau	1	0	1
11				Own goal	1	0	1
TOTALS					56	0	56

=== Clean sheets ===
Place	Position	Nation	Number	Name	Segunda División	Copa del Rey	Total
1	GK	(Brazil)	25	Helton Leite	11	0	11
TOTALS					11	0	11

=== Disciplinary record ===
Number	Nation	Position	Name	Segunda División		Copa del Rey		Total	
Number	Nation	Position	Name	Yellow card	Red card	Yellow card	Red card	Yellow card	Red card
2	(Australia)	MF	Denis Genreau	0	1	0	0	0	1
3	(Netherlands)	FW	Zakaria Eddahchouri	1	0	0	0	1	0
4	(France)	DF	Pablo Martinez	4	0	0	0	4	0
5	(Spain)	DF	Dani Barcia	5	0	0	0	5	0
6	(Spain)	DF	Álex Petxarroman	4	0	0	0	4	0
7	(Spain)	FW	Diego Gómez	2	0	0	0	2	0
8	(Spain)	MF	Diego Villares	3	1	0	0	3	1
9	(Spain)	FW	Iván Barbero	3	1	0	0	3	1
10	(Spain)	FW	Yeremay Hernández	2	0	0	0	2	0
11	(Serbia)	DF	Nemanja Tošić	1	0	0	0	1	0
12	(Democratic Republic of the Congo)	MF	Omenuke Mfulu	5	0	0	0	5	0
15	(Spain)	DF	Pablo Vázquez	4	0	0	0	4	0
17	(Spain)	MF	David Mella	2	1	0	0	2	1
18	(Spain)	DF	Sergio Escudero	1	0	0	0	1	0
19	(Spain)	DF	Jaime Sánchez	2	0	0	0	2	0
20	(Spain)	MF	José Ángel	5	0	0	0	5	0
21	(Spain)	MF	Mario Soriano	4	0	0	0	4	0
22	(Spain)	MF	Hugo Rama	0	0	1	0	1	0
23	(Spain)	DF	Ximo Navarro	4	1	0	0	4	1
24	(Morocco)	FW	Mohamed Bouldini	2	0	0	0	2	0
25	(Brazil)	GK	Helton Leite	2	0	0	0	2	0
28	(England)	MF	Charlie Patino	1	0	0	0	1	0
33	(Spain)	DF	Rafael Obrador	5	0	0	0	5	0
Players who left Deportivo de La Coruña during the season:
7	(Spain)	FW	Lucas Pérez	5	0	0	0	5	0
			TOTALS	67	5	1	0	68	5
