= 2026–27 Deportivo de A Coruña season =

Deportivo de A Coruña
2026–27 season
- President: Juan Carlos Escotet
- Head coach: Antonio Hidalgo
- Stadium: Riazor
- La Liga: 7th
- Copa del Rey: First round
- Top goalscorer: League: Pierre-Emerick Aubameyang (5); All: Pierre-Emerick Aubameyang (5)
Home colours	Away colours	Third colours

The 2026–27 season is the 120th season in the history of Deportivo de A Coruña, and the club's first season back in La Liga since the 2017–18 campaign. In addition to the domestic league, the club is participating in the Copa del Rey.

== Players ==
=== First-team squad ===
As of 16 September 2026

Note: Flags indicate national team as defined under FIFA eligibility rules; some limited exceptions apply. Players may hold more than one non-FIFA nationality.

No.	Pos.	Nation	Player
1	GK	ESP	Germán Parreño
2	DF	ESP	Adrià Altimira
3	DF	ESP	Arnau Comas
4	DF	BEL	Lucas Noubi
5	DF	ESP	Dani Barcia
6	MF	ESP	Marc Casadó (on loan from Barcelona)
7	FW	GAB	Pierre-Emerick Aubameyang
8	MF	ESP	Diego Villares (captain)
9	FW	NED	Zakaria Eddahchouri
10	FW	ESP	Yeremay
11	FW	ESP	David Mella
12	DF	ITA	Giacomo Quagliata
13	GK	ESP	Leo Román

No.	Pos.	Nation	Player
14	MF	ESP	Riki Rodríguez
15	DF	ESP	Miguel Loureiro
16	MF	ITA	Lorenzo Amatucci
17	DF	ESP	Angeliño (on loan from Roma)
18	MF	DEN	Jonathan Asp Jensen
19	FW	ESP	Luismi Cruz
20	DF	URU	José María Giménez (on loan from Atlético Madrid)
21	MF	ESP	Mario Soriano
22	DF	POL	Bright Ede
23	DF	ESP	Ximo Navarro
24	FW	ESP	Adama Traoré
25	GK	ESP	Álvaro Fernández
32	FW	CMR	Bil Nsongo

=== Out on loan ===
Note: Flags indicate national team as defined under FIFA eligibility rules; some limited exceptions apply. Players may hold more than one non-FIFA nationality.

No.	Pos.	Nation	Player
—	GK	ESP	Eric Puerto (at Penafiel until 30 June 2027)
—	MF	NED	Teun Gijselhart (at Al Ain until 30 June 2027)

No.	Pos.	Nation	Player
—	MF	ESP	Diego Gómez (at Huesca until 30 June 2027)
—	MF	ENG	Charlie Patino (at VfL Bochum until 30 June 2027)

== Transfers ==
=== In ===
Date	Pos.	Nat.	Player	To	Type	Ref.
19 June 2026	MF	(Netherlands)	Teun Gijselhart	(Netherlands) De Graafschap	Transfer	
3 July 2026	GK	(Spain)	Leo Román	(Spain) Mallorca	Transfer	
7 July 2026	DF	(Poland)	Bright Ede	(Poland) Motor Lublin	Transfer	
9 July 2026	MF	(Italy)	Lorenzo Amatucci	(Italy) Fiorentina	Transfer	
13 July 2026	MF	(Denmark)	Jonathan Asp Jensen	(Germany) Bayern Munich	Transfer	
17 July 2026	FW	(Gabon)	Pierre-Emerick Aubameyang	(France) Marseille	Transfer	
26 August 2026	MF	(Spain)	Adama Traoré	(England) West Ham United	Free transfer	

==== Loans in ====
Date	Pos.	Nat.	Player	From	Duration	Ref.
5 August 2026	DF	(Spain)	Angeliño	(Italy) Roma	End of season	
1 September 2026	MF	(Spain)	Marc Casadó	(Spain) Barcelona	End of season	
1 September 2026	DF	(Uruguay)	José María Giménez	(Spain) Atlético Madrid	End of season	

=== Out ===
Date	Pos.	Nat.	Player	To	Type	Ref.
2 July 2026	DF	(Spain)	Sergio Escudero	(Spain) Zaragoza	Free transfer	
7 July 2026	MF	(Spain)	Luis Chacón	(Spain) Valladolid	Transfer	
10 July 2026	DF	(Spain)	Álex Petxarroman	(Spain) Ceuta	Free transfer	
31 July 2026	MF	(Morocco)	Mohamed Bouldini	(Portugal) Académico de Viseu	Contract termination	
28 August 2026	FW	(Spain)	Cristian Herrera	(Spain) Huesca	Free transfer	

==== Loans out ====
Date	Pos.	Nat.	Player	To	Duration	Ref.
20 July 2026	MF	(Spain)	Diego Gómez	(Spain) Huesca	End of season	
31 August 2026	MF	(England)	Charlie Patino	(Germany) VfL Bochum	End of season	
1 September 2026	GK	(Spain)	Eric Puerto	(Portugal) Penafiel	End of season	

== Competitions ==
=== La Liga ===
==== League table ====
Pos	Team	Pld	W	D	L	GF	GA	GD	Pts
10	Villarreal	13	4	3	6	19	18	+1	15
11	Espanyol	13	4	3	6	14	14	0	15
12	Deportivo A Coruña	13	3	6	4	16	17	−1	15
13	Celta Vigo	13	2	7	4	11	12	−1	13
14	Rayo Vallecano	12	3	3	6	15	22	−7	12

Updated to match(es) played on 22 November 2026. Source: LaLiga EA Sports
Rules for classification: 1) Points; 2) Head-to-head points; 3) Head-to-head goal difference; 4) Goal difference; 5) Goals scored; 6) Fair-play points (if three or more teams tied); 7) Play-off at neutral site.
(Note: Head-to-head record is used only after all the matches between the teams in question have been played)

==== Matches ====
17 August 2026 1	Deportivo A Coruña	1–1	Elche	A Coruña
21:00 CEST (UTC+2)	Aubameyang 21'; Navarro (yellow card) 26'; Amatucci (yellow card) 45+1'	Report	Villar (yellow card) 67'; Aguado 76'; Konare (yellow card) 88'	Stadium: Estadio Riazor; Attendance: 29,038; Referee: Francisco Hernández Maeso

24 August 2026 2	Málaga	1–1	Deportivo A Coruña	Málaga
21:30 CEST (UTC+2)	Chupete 34' (pen.); Larrubia (yellow card) 61'	Report	Aubameyang 21'; Soriano (yellow card) 25'; Quagliata (yellow card) 57'; Navarro (yellow card) 79'; Nsongo (yellow card) 89'	Stadium: Estadio La Rosaleda; Attendance: 29,014; Referee: Javier Alberola Rojas

30 August 2026 3	Deportivo A Coruña	3–1	Valencia	A Coruña
19:30 CEST (UTC+2)	Tárrega 13' (o.g.); Aubameyang 17'; Diakhaby 59' (o.g.); Altimira (yellow card) 90+3' (yellow-red card) 90+3'		Sadiq 26'; Diakhaby (yellow card) 65'	Stadium: Estadio Riazor; Attendance: 29,077; Referee: Miguel Ángel Ortiz Arias

5 September 2026 4	Villarreal	2–3	Deportivo A Coruña	Villarreal
21:00 CEST (UTC+2)	Pépé 19'; Traoré 76' (o.g.); Comesaña (yellow card) 81'; Buchanan (yellow card) 87'	Report	Cruz 43'; Eddahchouri 79'; Aubameyang 88'; Amatucci (yellow card) 90+1'; Yeremay (yellow card) 90+3'	Stadium: Estadio de la Cerámica; Attendance: 18,302; Referee: Jesús Gil Manzano

13 September 2026 5	Getafe	1–1	Deportivo A Coruña	Getafe
18:30 CEST (UTC+2)	Azón (yellow card) 26'; Ünal (yellow card) 42'; Terrats 66'; Martín (yellow card) 90+6'	Report	Noubi (yellow card) 27'; Aubameyang 78'	Stadium: Coliseum; Attendance: 8,416; Referee: Ricardo de Burgos Bengoetxea

16 September 2026 6	Deportivo A Coruña	0–1	Sevilla	A Coruña
19:00 CEST (UTC+2)	Angeliño (yellow card) 59' (red card); Amatucci (yellow card) 77'	Report	Sierra 52'; Salas (yellow card) 65'; Guridi (yellow card) 79'; Romero (yellow card) 90+4'; Iglesias (yellow card) 90+6'	Stadium: Abanca-Riazor; Attendance: 28,506; Referee: Alejandro Hernández Hernández

20 September 2026 7	Deportivo A Coruña	1–1	Real Betis	A Coruña
18:30 CEST (UTC+2)	Ede (yellow card) 3'; Villares 87'	Report	Hernández 43'; Gómez (yellow card) 65'	Stadium: Riazor; Attendance: 29,034; Referee: César Soto Grado

11 October 2026 8	Real Sociedad	3–2	Deportivo A Coruña	San Sebastián
14:15 CEST (UTC+2)	Martín 29'; Zakharyan 34'; Guedes 54'; Marín (yellow card) 66' (red card); Herrera (yellow card) 90+4'		Mella (yellow card) 40'; Soriano 61'; Yeremay 69' (pen.); Giménez (yellow card) 71'; Amatucci (yellow card) 90' (red card)	Stadium: Anoeta; Attendance: 33,644; Referee: Miguel Sesma Espinosa

16 October 2026 9	Deportivo A Coruña	1–1	Levante	A Coruña
21:00 CEST (UTC+2)	Cruz (yellow card) 42'; Nsongo 63'; Altimira (yellow card) 90+6'; Giménez (yellow card) 90+7'	Report	Iv. Romero (yellow card) 33'; Requena 82'; Dela (yellow card) 89'	Stadium: Estadio Riazor; Attendance: 28,437; Referee: Roberto Tejero García

24 October 2026 10	Atlético Madrid	1–0	Deportivo A Coruña	Madrid
21:00 CEST (UTC+2)	Pubill (yellow card) 26'; Alvarez 48'; Sørloth (yellow card) 85'; Baena (yellow card) 86'; Simeone (yellow card) 87'	Report	Hernández (yellow card) 75'; Quagliata (yellow card) 79'; Carreras (yellow card) 90+5'	Stadium: Riyadh Air Metropolitano; Attendance: 68,674; Referee: José María Sánchez Martínez

2 November 2026 11	Deportivo A Coruña	2–1	Osasuna	A Coruña
20:00 CET (UTC+1)	Soriano 64'; Nsongo 87'	Report	Budimir 32'; Gómez (yellow card) 35'; Catena (yellow card) 63'; Bretones (yellow card) 81'	Stadium: Estadio Riazor; Attendance: 26,831; Referee: Jon González Esteban

7 November 2026 12	Espanyol	0–0	Deportivo A Coruña	Cornellà de Llobregat
15:15 CET (UTC+1)	R. Fernández (yellow card) 44'; Cabrera (yellow card) 73'; Santiago (yellow card) 77'; Moscardo (yellow card) 89'	Report	Cruz (yellow card) 39'; Villares (yellow card) 82'; Amatucci (yellow card) 83'; Aubameyang (yellow card) 89'	Stadium: RCDE Stadium; Attendance: 31,030; Referee: Alejandro Quintero González

21 November 2026 13	Alavés	3–1	Deportivo A Coruña	Vitoria-Gasteiz
13:00 CET (UTC+1)	Pérez 2', (yellow card) 32'; Boyé (penalty missed) 55', 62', (yellow card) 66'; Rebbach (yellow card) 57'; Guevara (yellow card) 89'; Suárez 90'	Report	Navarro (yellow card) 5'; Quagliata (yellow card) 19'; Tenaglia 41' (o.g.); Loureiro (yellow card) 48'; Traoré (yellow card) 56'	Stadium: Mendizorrotza Stadium; Attendance: 17,277; Referee: Víctor García Verdura

29 November 2026 14	Deportivo A Coruña	v	Barcelona

6 December 2026 15	Racing Santander	v	Deportivo A Coruña

13 December 2026 16	Deportivo A Coruña	v	Athletic Bilbao

20 December 2026 17	Deportivo A Coruña	v	Real Madrid

3 January 2027 18	Celta Vigo	v	Deportivo A Coruña

10 January 2027 19	Deportivo A Coruña	v	Rayo Vallecano

17 January 2027 20	Real Betis	v	Deportivo A Coruña

24 January 2027 21	Deportivo A Coruña	v	Atlético Madrid

31 January 2027 22	Osasuna	v	Deportivo A Coruña

7 February 2027 23	Deportivo A Coruña	v	Málaga

14 February 2027 24	Elche	v	Deportivo A Coruña

21 February 2027 25	Deportivo A Coruña	v	Real Sociedad

28 February 2027 26	Levante	v	Deportivo A Coruña

7 March 2027 27	Deportivo A Coruña	v	Getafe

14 March 2027 28	Barcelona	v	Deportivo A Coruña

21 March 2027 29	Valencia	v	Deportivo A Coruña

4 April 2027 30	Deportivo A Coruña	v	Villarreal

11 April 2027 31	Sevilla	v	Deportivo A Coruña

18 April 2027 32	Celta Vigo	v	Deportivo A Coruña

21 April 2027 33	Athletic Bilbao	v	Deportivo A Coruña

2 May 2027 34	Deportivo A Coruña	v	Racing Santander

=== Copa del Rey ===
29 October 2026	Auriense	0–3	Deportivo A Coruña	Ourense (Note: Auriense did not play the match in their main stadium Campo de Oira, Ourense, as it did not meet the broadcasting requirements.)
21:00		Report	Jensen 45', 57'; Cruz 85'	Stadium: O Couto
