= Zakaria Eddahchouri =

Dutch footballer (born 2000)

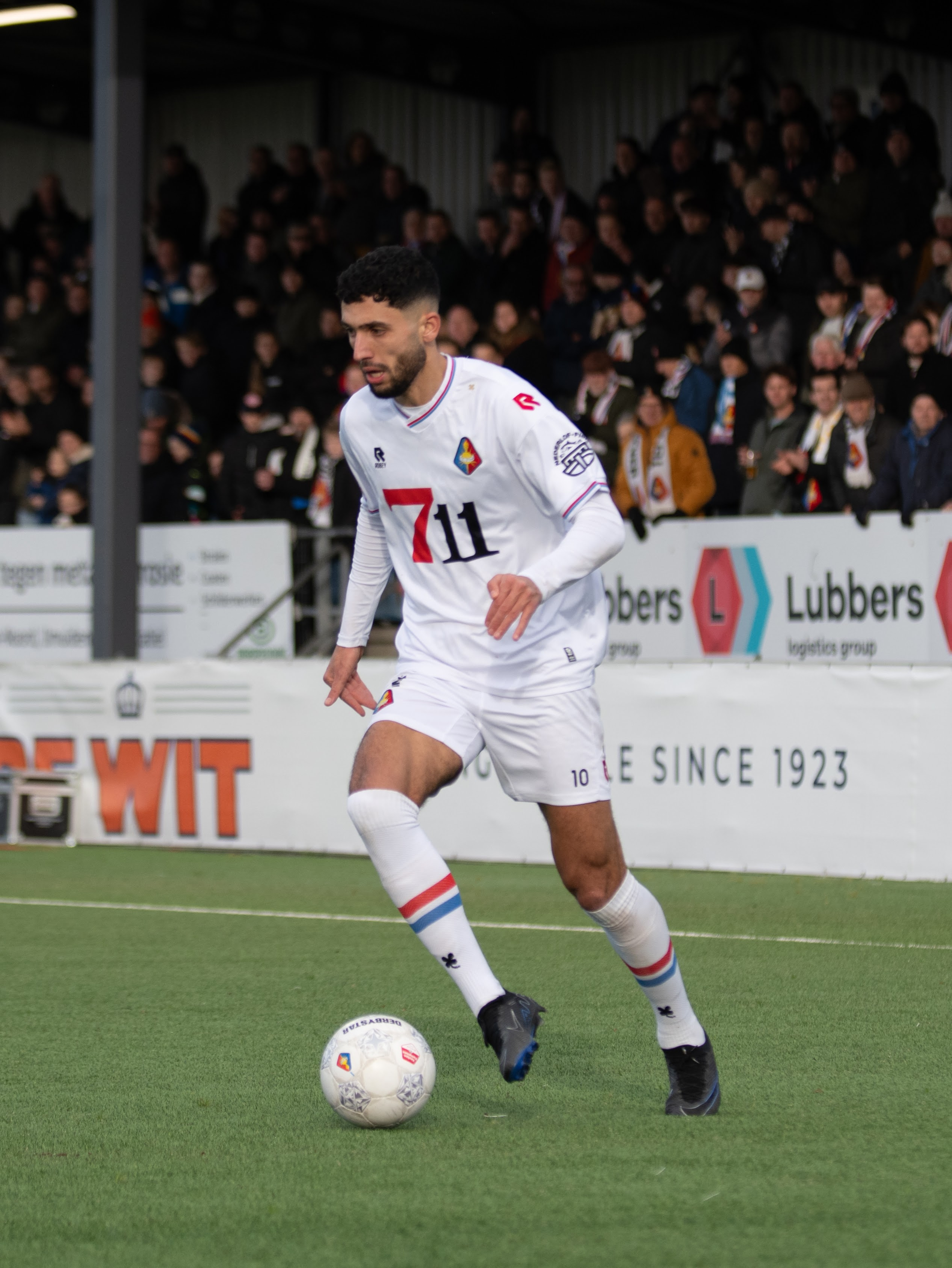
- Eddahchouri with Telstar in 2025

Personal information
- Date of birth: 11 May 2000 (age 26)
- Place of birth: Papendrecht, Netherlands
- Height: 1.87 m (6 ft 2 in)
- Positions: Striker; attacking midfielder

Team information
- Current team: Deportivo A Coruña
- Number: 9

Youth career
- VV Papendrecht
- –2014: Feyenoord
- 2014–2017: Spartaan'20
- 2017–2019: Go Ahead Eagles

Senior career*
Years	Team	Apps	(Gls)
2019–2022	Go Ahead Eagles	28	(1)
2022–2023	Koninklijke HFC	30	(16)
2023–2025	Telstar	50	(31)
2025–	Deportivo A Coruña	52	(16)
- * Club domestic league appearances and goals as of 20 June 2026

Zakaria Eddahchouri (born 11 May 2000) is a Dutch professional footballer who plays as a striker or attacking midfielder for La Liga club Deportivo A Coruña.

== Career ==
=== Early years ===
Having made his debut for the club on 3 May 2019 in a 2–0 Eerste Divisie defeat at Den Bosch, he signed a three-year contract with Go Ahead Eagles in July 2019.

Eddahchouri joined Tweede Divisie club Koninklijke HFC ahead of the 2022–23 season. He impressed, scoring 16 goals in 31 appearances for the club.

=== Telstar ===
On 13 July 2023, Eddahchouri signed a one-year contract with an option for an additional year with Eerste Divisie club Telstar. He made his debut for the club on 14 August, starting in a 1–0 league loss on the opening day of the season to Jong PSV. He scored his first professional goal the following game, on 18 August, in a 3–2 home loss to Cambuur. On 17 November, he netted a hat-trick, propelling Telstar to a commanding 4–1 away triumph against Den Bosch. In December he repeated this trick in the match against Helmond Sport (3–0). He became the top goalscorer of the Eerste Divisie's second period. He managed to hold on to this title and scored 17 goals in 23 games.

=== Deportivo de A Coruña ===
On 30 January 2025, it was announced that Eddahchouri would leave Telstar for Spanish club Deportivo de La Coruña of the Segunda División, signing a three-and-a-half-year contract with the club. He made his competitive debut for Dépor on 2 February 2025, coming on as a 70th-minute substitute for Iván Barbero in a 1–0 away win over Eibar. One week later, on 10 February, he made his first start for the club and scored his first goal in a 3–1 home victory over Almería. Eddahchouri impressed with his movement and work rate, drawing praise from head coach Óscar Gilsanz, who described him as "a different kind of striker" and noted his adaptability to the team's playing style.

On 5 May 2025, Eddahchouri ended an eight-match goal drought by scoring twice in a 5–1 win over Albacete. His first was a solo run from midfield; the second a header assisted by Yeremay. All four of his goals that season came at the Riazor, with Deportivo unbeaten in matches where he scored.

Eddahchouri began the 2025–26 season in strong form for Deportivo in the Segunda División. He scored a hat-trick on 13 September 2025 after coming off the bench in a 5–1 away win over Mirandés, with all three goals coming in a 16-minute span to turn the match in Deportivo's favour, an achievement that contributed to his being named Segunda División Player of the Month for September 2025. He continued to contribute throughout the campaign, and on 21 February 2026 scored the only goal in a 1–0 victory against Eibar, ending a multi-month scoring drought and helping Deportivo secure consecutive home wins.

== Personal life ==
Born in the Netherlands, Eddahchouri is of Moroccan descent.

On 17 May 2025, Eddahchouri sustained minor injuries after reportedly falling onto rocks while attempting to take a selfie near the waterfront in A Coruña. Emergency services, including a maritime rescue helicopter, were deployed to assist. He was hospitalised overnight and discharged the following day.

== Career statistics ==
As of match played 21 February 2026

Appearances and goals by club, season and competition
Club	Season	League			KNVB Cup		Other		Total	
Club	Season	Division	Apps	Goals	Apps	Goals	Apps	Goals	Apps	Goals
Go Ahead Eagles	2018–19	Eerste Divisie	1	0	0	0	0	0	1	0
Go Ahead Eagles	2019–20	Eerste Divisie	5	0	1	0	0	0	6	0
Go Ahead Eagles	2020–21	Eerste Divisie	21	0	1	1	0	0	22	1
Go Ahead Eagles	2021–22	Eredivisie	1	0	0	0	0	0	1	0
Go Ahead Eagles	Total		28	0	2	1	0	0	30	1
Koninklijke HFC	2022–23	Tweede Divisie	30	16	1	0	—		31	16
Telstar	2023–24	Eerste Divisie	27	14	1	0	—		28	14
Telstar	2024–25	Eerste Divisie	23	17	2	0	—		25	17
Telstar	Total		50	31	3	0	—		53	31
Deportivo A Coruña	2024–25	Segunda División	16	4	0	0	—		16	4
Deportivo A Coruña	2025–26	Segunda División	25	9	3	1	—		28	10
Deportivo A Coruña	Total		41	13	3	1	—		44	14
Career total			149	60	9	2	0	0	158	62

== Honours ==
Individual

- Segunda División Player of the Month: September 2025
