= Eric Puerto =

Spanish footballer

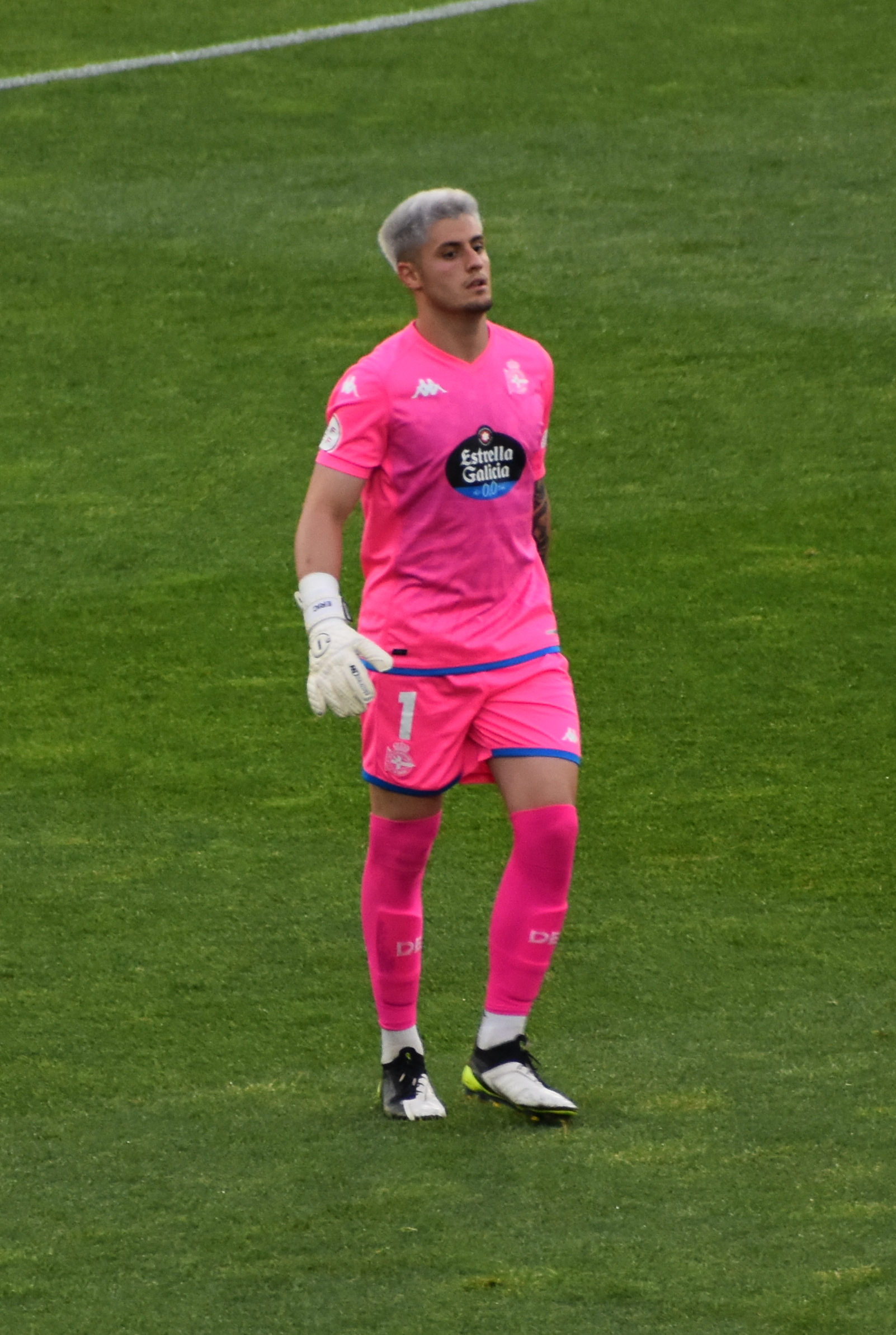
- Puerto playing for Deportivo La Coruña in 2024

Personal information
- Full name: Eric Puerto Huerta
- Date of birth: 28 October 2002 (age 24)
- Place of birth: Estepa, Spain
- Height: 1.85 m (6 ft 1 in)
- Position: Goalkeeper

Team information
- Current team: Penafiel (on loan from Deportivo A Coruña)
- Number: 13

Youth career
- Peloteros Sierra Sur
- 2018: Séneca
- 2019–2021: Córdoba

Senior career*
Years	Team	Apps	(Gls)
2020–2021	Córdoba B	6	(0)
2021–2024	Antequera	44	(0)
2024–	Deportivo A Coruña	1	(0)
2025	→ Marbella (loan)	15	(0)
2026–	→ Penafiel (loan)	0	(0)
- * Club domestic league appearances and goals as of 24 May 2025

Eric Puerto Huerta (born 28 October 2002) is a Spanish professional footballer who plays as a goalkeeper for Portuguese club F.C. Penafiel, on loan from Deportivo de A Coruña.

== Career ==
Born in Estepa, Seville, Andalusia, Puerto represented Peloteros Sierra Sur, Séneca and Córdoba as a youth. He made his senior debut with the latter's reserves on 12 January 2020, starting in a 2–0 Tercera División away win over Los Barrios.

On 21 July 2021, after finishing his formation, Puerto signed for Segunda División RFEF side Antequera. After spending his first season as a backup, he subsequently became a starter and helped the club in their promotion to Primera Federación in his second year.

On 9 January 2024, Puerto signed a three-and-a-half-year contract with Deportivo de La Coruña also in the third division. He spent the remainder of the campaign as a backup to Germán Parreño as the club achieved promotion to the Segunda División.

Demoted to third-choice after the arrival of Helton Leite, Puerto was loaned to third division side Marbella FC on 22 January 2025. Back to Dépor in July, he was again a third-choice behind Germán and Álvaro Fernández as they achieved another promotion.

On 1 September 2026, after falling further down the pecking order after the arrival of Leo Román, Puerto was loaned to Liga Portugal 2 side F.C. Penafiel.

== Honours ==
Deportivo La Coruña

- Primera Federación: 2023–24
