= Diego Gómez (footballer, born 2004) =

Spanish footballer

Personal information
- Full name: Diego Gómez Pérez
- Date of birth: 31 July 2004 (age 22)
- Place of birth: Amoeiro, Spain
- Height: 1.77 m (5 ft 10 in)
- Position: Winger

Team information
- Current team: Huesca (on loan from Deportivo de A Coruña)
- Number: 21

Youth career
- 2009–2016: Santa Teresita
- 2016–2017: Rayo 21
- 2017–2019: Pabellón Ourense
- 2019–2021: Deportivo La Coruña

Senior career*
Years	Team	Apps	(Gls)
2022–2024	Deportivo B	45	(13)
2023–	Deportivo A Coruña	18	(0)
2024–2025	→ Arenteiro (loan)	20	(2)
2025–2026	→ Cartagena (loan)	18	(1)
2026	→ Pontevedra (loan)	15	(1)
2026–	→ Huesca (loan)	0	(0)
- * Club domestic league appearances and goals as of 9 June 2026

Diego Gómez Pérez (born 31 July 2004) is a Spanish professional footballer who plays as a winger for SD Huesca, on loan from Deportivo de A Coruña.

== Career ==
Born in Amoeiro, Ourense, Galicia, Gómez joined Deportivo de La Coruña's youth setup in 2019, after representing Pabellón Ourense CF, Rayo 21 CF and CDC Santa Teresita. He made his senior debut with the reserves on 15 January 2022, coming on as a late substitute in a 0–0 Tercera División RFEF home draw against CF Noia.

Gómez scored his first senior goal on 11 September 2022, netting the B's winner in a 1–0 away success over UD Paiosaco. He subsequently became a regular with the B-side before making his first team debut on 23 September 2023, replacing Diego Villares late into a 1–1 Primera Federación home draw against UE Cornellà; the following day, he scored a brace with the B's in a 3–2 home win over Arandina CF.

On 13 March 2024, Gómez renewed his contract with Dépor until 2028. On 23 July, he agreed to a one-year loan with CD Arenteiro in the third division.

On 23 January 2025, Gómez was recalled by Deportivo. He made his professional debut two days later, replacing Rafael Obrador late into a 2–1 Segunda División home loss to Levante UD.

On 1 September 2025, Gómez was loaned to third division side FC Cartagena, for one year. The following 24 January, he moved to fellow league team Pontevedra CF also in a temporary deal, and joined SD Huesca still on division three on 20 July 2026, also on loan.

== Honours ==
Deportivo La Coruña

- Primera Federación: 2023–24
