= Jaime Sánchez (footballer, born 1995) =

Spanish footballer

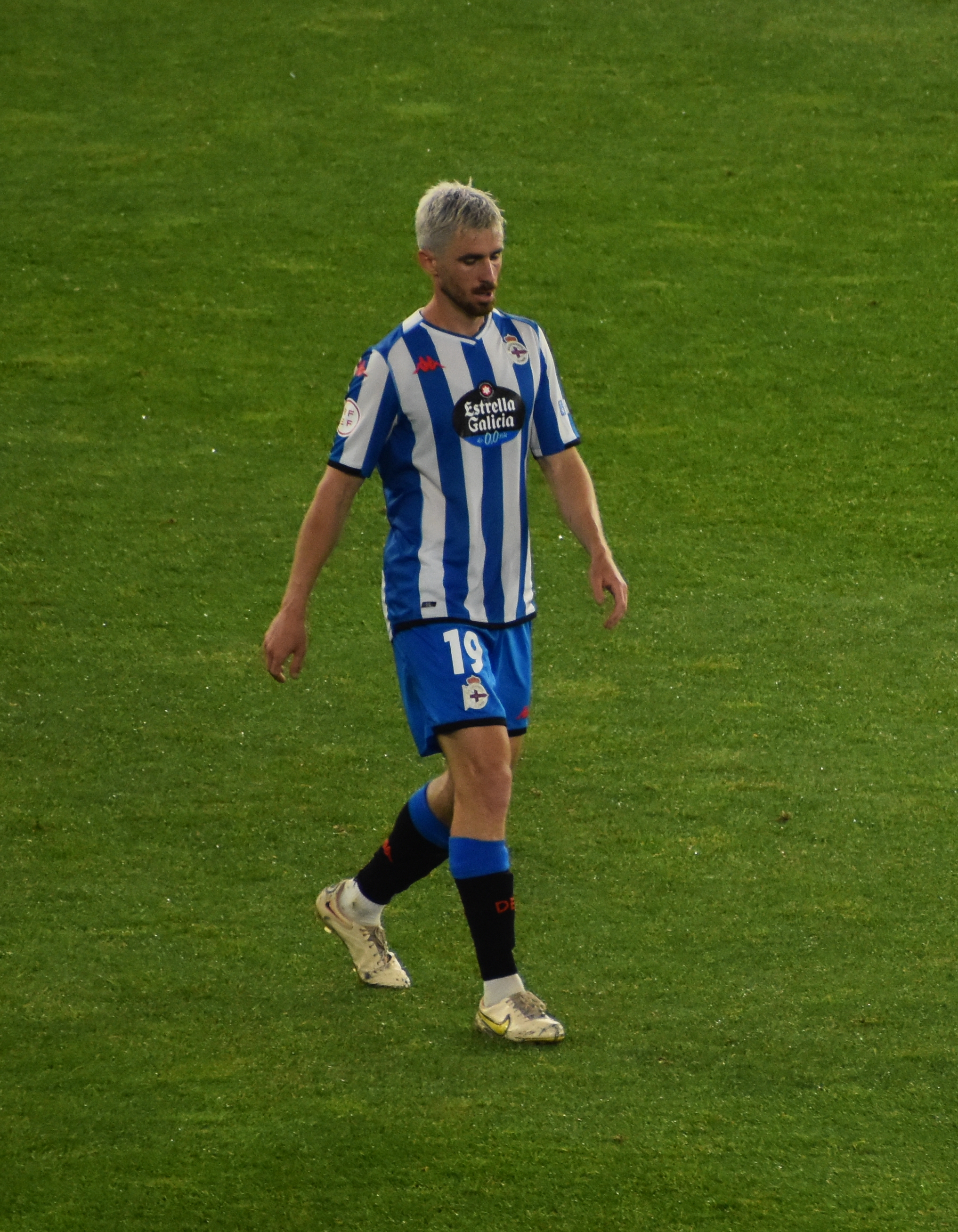
- Sánchez playing for Deportivo La Coruña in 2024

Personal information
- Full name: Jaime Sánchez Muñoz
- Date of birth: 11 March 1995 (age 31)
- Place of birth: Chiclana de la Frontera, Spain
- Height: 1.84 m (6 ft 0 in)
- Position: Centre back

Team information
- Current team: Penafiel
- Number: 5

Youth career
- 2002–2009: Sancti Petri
- 2009–2012: Cádiz
- 2012–2014: Real Madrid

Senior career*
Years	Team	Apps	(Gls)
2013–2014	Real Madrid C	7	(0)
2014–2019	Real Madrid B	22	(0)
2016–2017	→ Sabadell (loan)	0	(0)
2018–2020	Valladolid B	36	(0)
2020–2021	Sabadell	32	(1)
2021–2025	Deportivo La Coruña	90	(2)
2025–	Penafiel	20	(0)

International career
2012	Spain U17	5	(0)
2013	Spain U18	2	(0)
2013–2014	Spain U19	12	(0)
2014	Spain U21	1	(0)
- * Club domestic league appearances and goals as of 20 June 2026

Jaime Sánchez Muñoz (born 11 March 1995) is a Spanish footballer who plays as a central defender for Liga Portugal 2 club Penafiel.

== Club career ==
Born in Chiclana de la Frontera, Cádiz, Andalusia, Sánchez joined Real Madrid's La Fábrica in August 2012, from Cádiz CF, for a fee of €250,000. He made his senior debut with the former's C-team at the age of 17 on 24 March 2013, starting in a 1–2 Segunda División B away loss against Sporting de Gijón B.

Sánchez was promoted to the reserves for 2014–15, ending the season as a starter but subsequently suffering an injury which kept him out for the entire 2015–16 campaign. On 28 July 2016, he was loaned to fellow third division side CE Sabadell FC, but did not play after again struggling with injuries.

Sánchez only returned to action on 24 September 2017, in a 1–2 loss at CDA Navalcarnero, 861 days after his last official match. He spent the first half of the 2018–19 season unregistered, and subsequently moved to Real Valladolid's B-team on 31 January 2019.

On 18 June 2019, Sánchez renewed his contract with the Blanquivioletas until 2021. On 14 August of the following year, he returned to Sabadell, with his side now in Segunda División.

Sánchez made his professional debut on 19 September 2020, starting in a 1–2 away loss against Rayo Vallecano. The following 19 July, after suffering relegation, he signed a one-year deal with Deportivo de La Coruña in the Primera División RFEF.

Sánchez was a backup option to Pablo Martinez and Pablo Vázquez during the 2023–24 campaign, scoring once in 23 matches overall as Dépor returned to the second division. On 18 June 2024, he renewed his link for a further year.
