= David Mella =

Spanish footballer

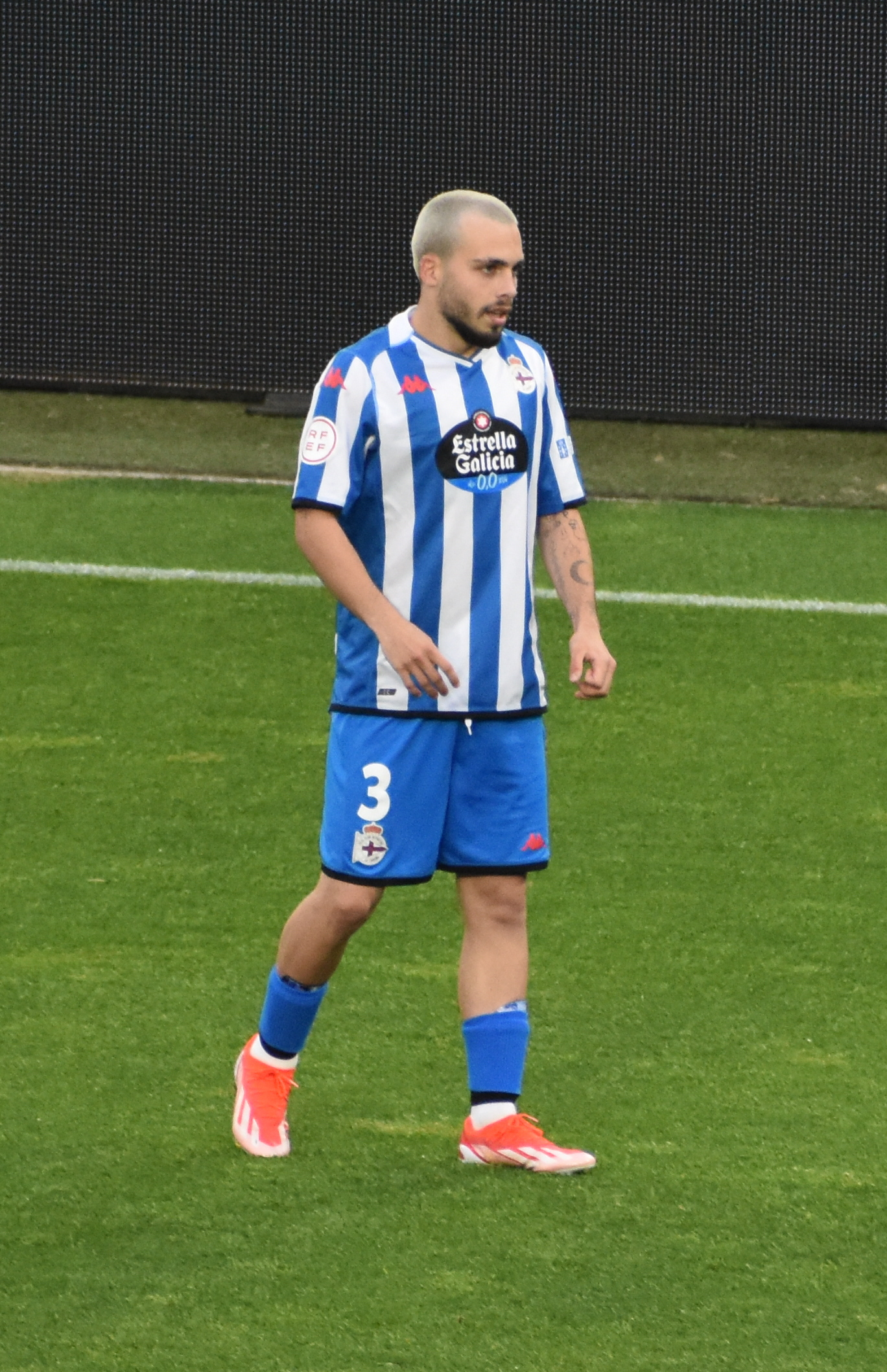
- Mella playing for Deportivo La Coruña in 2024

Personal information
- Full name: David Mella Boullón
- Date of birth: 23 May 2005 (age 21)
- Place of birth: Teo, Spain
- Height: 1.71 m (5 ft 7 in)
- Position: Winger

Team information
- Current team: Deportivo A Coruña
- Number: 11

Youth career
- San Tirso
- 2017–2021: Deportivo La Coruña

Senior career*
Years	Team	Apps	(Gls)
2021–2023	Deportivo B	37	(4)
2023–	Deportivo A Coruña	91	(17)

International career^{‡}
2020	Spain U15	3	(0)
2021–2022	Spain U17	15	(4)
2022	Spain U18	2	(1)
2024	Spain U19	9	(0)
2025	Spain U20	7	(0)
Medal record
Men's football
Representing Spain
UEFA European Under-19 Championship
Winner	2024 Northern Ireland
- * Club domestic league appearances and goals as of 17 August 2026 ‡ National team caps and goals as of 11 October 2025

David Mella Boullón (born 23 May 2005) is a Spanish professional footballer who plays as a winger for Deportivo de A Coruña.

== Club career ==
Mella was born in Teo, A Coruña, Galicia, and joined Deportivo de La Coruña's youth setup from San Tirso SD. On 1 June 2021, while still a youth, he renewed his contract with the club until 2024.

Mella made his senior debut with the reserves on 12 September 2021, coming on as a second-half substitute in a 0–0 Tercera División RFEF home draw against Racing Club Villalbés. He scored his first senior goal the following 24 April, netting the B's third in a 3–0 home win over Rápido de Bouzas.

Mella made his first team debut with Dépor on 20 May 2023, replacing fellow youth graduate Yeremay Hernández in a 4–0 Primera Federación home routing of Algeciras CF. On 19 July, he renewed his link until 2026, and scored his first goal with the main squad on 3 September, in a 3–0 win at CD Lugo.

On 1 February 2024, Mella was definitely promoted to the first team of Deportivo, being assigned the number 3 jersey. He finished the season with nine goals overall in 33 appearances, as the club achieved promotion to Segunda División as champions.

Mella made his professional debut on 17 August 2024, starting in a 1–0 home loss to Real Oviedo. He scored his first professional goals on 27 September, netting a brace in a 5–2 away routing of Albacete Balompié.

Mella renewed his contract until 2029 on 7 November 2024, and was regularly used as the club achieved promotion to La Liga in 2026. He made his top tier debut on 17 August of that year, replacing Mario Soriano in a 1–1 home draw against Elche CF.

== International career ==
Mella represented Spain at under-15, under-17, under-18 and under-19 levels, playing in the 2022 UEFA European Under-17 Championship and the 2024 UEFA European Under-19 Championship and winning the latter tournament.

== Personal life ==
Mella's father Gonzalo was also a footballer. A forward, he too was developed at Deportivo.

== Honours ==
Deportivo La Coruña

- Primera Federación: 2023–24

Spain U19

- UEFA European Under-19 Championship: 2024
