= Luis Chacón =

Spanish footballer

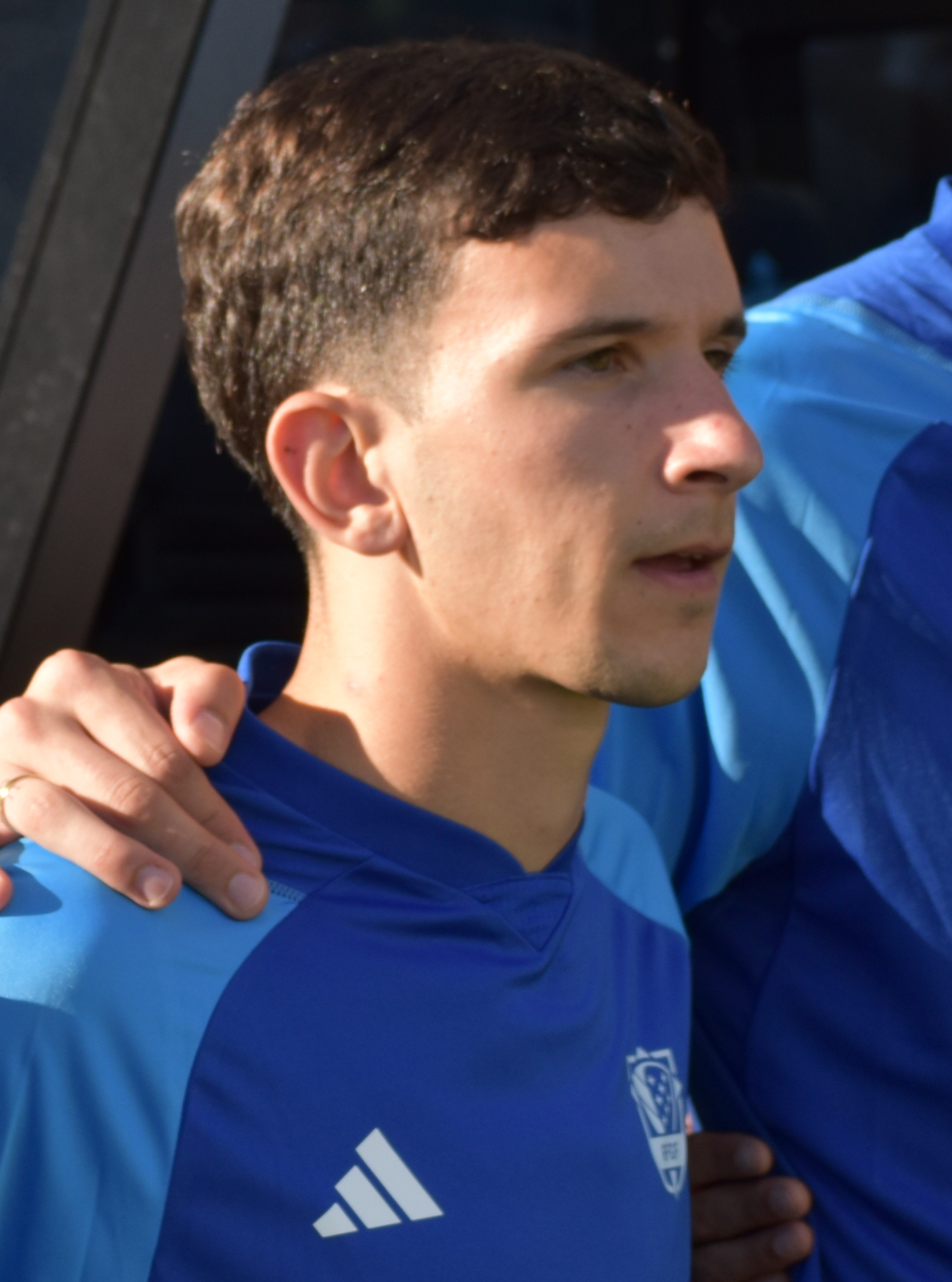
- Chacón with Galicia in 2024

Personal information
- Full name: Luis Rodríguez Chacón
- Date of birth: 30 May 2000 (age 26)
- Place of birth: Pontedeume, Spain
- Height: 1.74 m (5 ft 9 in)
- Position: Winger

Team information
- Current team: Valladolid

Youth career
- Racing Ferrol

Senior career*
Years	Team	Apps	(Gls)
2016–2023	Racing Ferrol	61	(7)
2019–2021	→ Somozas (loan)	55	(10)
2023–2024	Arenteiro	36	(10)
2024–2026	Deportivo La Coruña	1	(0)
2024–2026	→ Cultural Leonesa (loan)	75	(20)
2026–	Valladolid	0	(0)

International career
2024	Galicia	1	(0)
- * Club domestic league appearances and goals as of 31 May 2026

Luis Rodríguez Chacón (born 30 May 2000) is a Spanish footballer who plays for Real Valladolid. Mainly a winger, he can also play as an attacking midfielder.

== Career ==
Chacón was born in Pontedeume, A Coruña, Galicia, and was a Racing de Ferrol youth graduate. He made his first team debut at the age of 16 on 27 November 2016, coming on as a late substitute for Bicho in a 2–0 Segunda División B away win over UD Somozas.

Back to the youth sides, Chacón spent the 2017–18 season with the Juvenil side, only returning to feature with the main squad during the 2018–19 campaign, with the club now in Tercera División. He scored his first senior goal on 21 April 2019, netting his team's fourth in a 5–1 home routing of CD Boiro; Racing would eventually achieve promotion two months later.

On 6 August 2019, Chacón was loaned to Somozas in the fourth tier, for one year. He became a regular starter for the side, and his loan was extended for a further season on 6 October 2020.

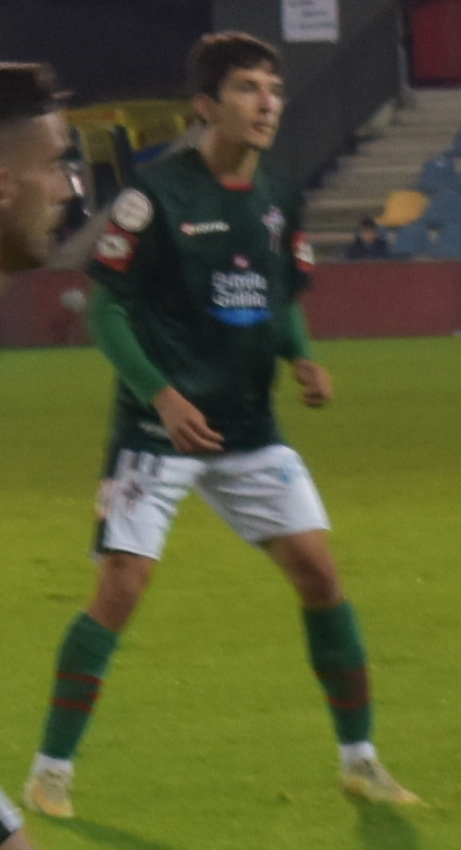
Chacón playing for Racing Ferrol in 2022

Back to Racing in July 2021, Chacón was definitely assigned to the first team in Primera División RFEF on 24 August. He started to feature more regularly in the 2022–23 campaign, scoring five goals in 29 league appearances as the club returned to Segunda División after 15 years, but left the club in July 2023.

On 25 August 2023, Chacón signed a one-year deal with CD Arenteiro also in the third division. On 12 July of the following year, after scoring ten goals during the season, he signed a four-year contract with Segunda División side Deportivo de La Coruña.

Chacón made his professional debut on 23 August 2024, replacing Mario Soriano late into a 2–1 away loss to SD Huesca. Seven days later, however, he was loaned to Cultural y Deportiva Leonesa in the third division, for one year.

Chacón helped Cultu to achieve promotion to the second division by scoring a career-best 13 goals overall, and had his loan renewed for a further year on 12 August 2025. He scored his first professional goal on 14 September, netting his side's second in a 4–2 away win over Racing de Santander.

On 7 July 2026, after suffering relegation with Cultural, Chacón signed a permanent five-year contract with Real Valladolid, still in division two.
