= Iván Barbero =

Spanish footballer

Personal information
- Full name: Iván Martínez Gonzálvez
- Date of birth: 17 August 1998 (age 28)
- Place of birth: Roquetas de Mar, Spain
- Height: 1.87 m (6 ft 2 in)
- Position: Forward

Team information
- Current team: Arouca
- Number: 17

Youth career
- Parador
- Poli Ejido
- 2011–2015: Poli Aguadulce
- 2015–2016: Natación Almería
- 2016–2017: Almería

Senior career*
| Years | Team | Apps | (Gls) |
| 2014 | Poli Aguadulce | 1 | (0) |
| 2017 | Almería B | 4 | (0) |
| 2017–2023 | Osasuna B | 117 | (41) |
| 2019–2023 | Osasuna | 6 | (0) |
| 2020 | → Almería (loan) | 9 | (0) |
| 2020–2021 | → Alcorcón (loan) | 32 | (2) |
| 2023–2025 | Deportivo La Coruña | 60 | (18) |
| 2025– | Arouca | 41 | (13) |
- * Club domestic league appearances and goals as of 1 November 2026

Iván Martínez Gonzálvez (born 17 August 1998), known as Iván Barbero or simply Barbero, is a Spanish professional footballer who plays as a forward for Primeira Liga club Arouca.

== Club career ==
Born in Roquetas de Mar, Almería, Andalusia, Barbero started his career with AD Parador. He then represented Polideportivo Ejido and AD Polideportivo Aguadulce, making his senior debut with the latter on 21 December 2014 by starting in a 3–0 Segunda Andaluza home win against CD La Cantoriana.

Barbero moved to Club Natación Almería in the 2015 summer, returning to youth football. In the following year he joined UD Almería, being initially assigned to the Juvenil A squad; he also represented the reserves in Tercera División during the campaign.

On 17 June 2017, Barbero signed for another reserve team, CA Osasuna B in Segunda División B. On 27 June 2019, after helping the B-team in their promotion back to the third division with 19 goals, he renewed his contract until 2023.

Barbero made his first team debut on 19 December 2019, starting in a 3–0 away win against CF Lorca Deportiva, for the season's Copa del Rey. The following 30 January, he returned to Almería on loan until the end of the season, with an obligatory € 2 million buyout clause in case of promotion.

Barbero made his professional debut on 2 February 2020, coming on as a late substitute for Radosav Petrović in a 1–1 away draw against CD Numancia. On 28 August, he moved to fellow second division side AD Alcorcón also in a temporary deal.

Upon returning, Barbero was assigned to the first team of Osasuna, and made his La Liga debut on 29 August 2021 by playing the last three minutes in a 3–2 away win over Cádiz CF. On 1 September 2022, after featuring rarely, he was demoted to the B-team, now in Primera Federación.

On 21 July 2023, Barbero signed a two-year contract with Deportivo de La Coruña also in the third division. On 16 July 2025, he moved abroad for the first time in his career, joining Portuguese Primeira Liga side FC Arouca on a two-year deal.

== Personal life ==
Barbero's father, also known as Barbero, was also a footballer. A goalkeeper, he also represented Almería.

== Career statistics ==
As of match played 17 May 2025

Appearances and goals by club, season and competition
| Club | Season | League | | | Copa del Rey | | Other | | Total | |
| Club | Season | Division | Apps | Goals | Apps | Goals | Apps | Goals | Apps | Goals |
|---|---|---|---|---|---|---|---|---|---|---|
| Poli Aguadulce | 2014–15 | Segunda Andaluza | 1 | 0 | — | | — | | 1 | 0 |
| Almería B | 2016–17 | Tercera División | 4 | 0 | — | | — | | 4 | 0 |
| Osasuna B | 2017–18 | Segunda División B | 26 | 0 | — | | — | | 26 | 0 |
| Osasuna B | 2018–19 | Tercera División | 36 | 18 | — | | 2 (Note: Appearance(s) in Promotion Playoffs) | 1 | 38 | 19 |
| Osasuna B | 2019–20 | Segunda División B | 20 | 10 | — | | — | | 20 | 10 |
| Osasuna B | 2022–23 | Primera Federación | 35 | 13 | — | | — | | 35 | 13 |
| Osasuna B | Total | | 117 | 41 | 0 | 0 | 2 | 1 | 119 | 42 |
| Osasuna | 2019–20 | La Liga | 0 | 0 | 1 | 0 | — | | 1 | 0 |
| Osasuna | 2021–22 | La Liga | 6 | 0 | 1 | 1 | — | | 7 | 1 |
| Osasuna | Total | | 6 | 0 | 2 | 1 | 0 | 0 | 8 | 1 |
| Almería (loan) | 2019–20 | Segunda División | 9 | 0 | 0 | 0 | 1 | 0 | 10 | 0 |
| Alcorcón (loan) | 2020–21 | Segunda División | 32 | 2 | 2 | 0 | — | | 34 | 2 |
| Deportivo La Coruña | 2023–24 | Primera Federación - II | 23 | 11 | 0 | 0 | 0 | 0 | 23 | 11 |
| Deportivo La Coruña | 2024–25 | Segunda División | 37 | 7 | 0 | 0 | — | | 37 | 7 |
| Deportivo La Coruña | Total | | 60 | 18 | 0 | 0 | 0 | 0 | 60 | 18 |
| Career total | | | 229 | 61 | 4 | 1 | 3 | 1 | 236 | 63 |
