= Teun Gijselhart =

Dutch footballer (born 2005)

Personal information
- Date of birth: 6 April 2005 (age 21)
- Place of birth: Amsterdam, Netherlands
- Height: 1.76 m (5 ft 9 in)
- Positions: Midfielder; winger; forward

Team information
- Current team: Al Ain (on loan from Deportivo A Coruña)
- Number: 5

Youth career
- –2016: AFC
- 2016–2023: AZ
- 2023–2025: PEC Zwolle

Senior career*
Years	Team	Apps	(Gls)
2024–2025	PEC Zwolle	3	(0)
2025–2026	De Graafschap	36	(0)
2026–	Deportivo A Coruña	1	(0)
2026–	→ Al Ain (loan)	2	(0)

International career
2020	Netherlands U15	3	(0)
2021	Netherlands U17	3	(1)
- * Club domestic league appearances and goals as of 11:48, 16 November 2026 (UTC)

Teun Gijselhart (born 6 April 2005) is a Dutch professional footballer who plays as a midfielder for UAE Pro League club Al Ain, on loan from La Liga club Deportivo de A Coruña.

== Early life ==
Gijselhart was born on 6 April 2005. Born in Amsterdam, Netherlands, he is a native of the city.

== Club career ==
As a youth player, Gijselhart joined the youth academy of Dutch side Amsterdamsche FC. Following his stint there, he joined the youth academy of AZ Alkmaar in 2016. Seven years later, he joined the youth academy of Dutch side PEC Zwolle and was promoted to the club's senior team in 2024, where he made four league appearances and scored zero goals.

During the summer of 2025, he signed for Dutch side De Graafschap, where he made thirty-eight league appearances and scored zero goals. Ahead of the 2026–27 season, he signed for Spanish side Deportivo de A Coruña.

== International career ==
Gijselhart is a Netherlands youth international. On 11 November 2021, he debuted for the Netherlands national under-17 football team during a 5–0 away friendly win over the Mexico national under-18 football team.

== Style of play ==
Gijselhart plays as a midfielder. Spanish newspaper Mundiario wrote in 2026 that he "plays as a central midfielder and is known for his ability to orchestrate play from the back".
