= Nemanja Tošić =

Serbian footballer

Personal information
- Full name: Nemanja Tošić
- Date of birth: 23 January 1997 (age 29)
- Place of birth: Belgrade, Yugoslavia
- Height: 1.89 m (6 ft 2 in)
- Position: Left-back

Team information
- Current team: Anorthosis Famagusta
- Number: 44

Youth career
- Red Star Belgrade

Senior career*
Years	Team	Apps	(Gls)
2015	Red Star Belgrade	0	(0)
2015	→ Rakovica (loan)	11	(0)
2016–2017	Sinđelić Beograd	44	(0)
2018–2020	Mačva Šabac	53	(0)
2020–2024	Čukarički	99	(6)
2024–2026	FC Zürich	10	(0)
2025	→ Deportivo La Coruña (loan)	7	(0)
2025–2026	→ Čukarički (loan)	9	(0)
2026–	Anorthosis Famagusta	23	(1)

International career
2015	Serbia U18	2	(0)
- * Club domestic league appearances and goals as of 25 October 2026

Nemanja Tošić (Serbian Cyrillic: Немања Тошић; born 23 January 1997) is a Serbian professional footballer who plays as a left-back for Anorthosis Famagusta.

== Club career ==
Born in Belgrade, Tošić was a product of Red Star Belgrade's academy, before being loaned out to Rakovica in the Serbian League in August 2015. In January of the following year, after 11 matches, he signed for Serbian First League side Sinđelić Beograd.

On 23 January 2018, Tošić left Sinđelić to join Mačva Šabac in the Serbian SuperLiga. He made his debut in the top tier on 17 February, starting in a 2–0 away loss to Čukarički.

On 14 July 2020, Tošić moved to Čukarički also in the top tier. He established himself as a regular starter for the side, helping them to reach the 2022–23 Serbian Cup final, where they lost to his former side Red Star, and also played in both the UEFA Europa League and the UEFA Conference League with the club.

On 24 June 2024, Tošić moved abroad for the first time in his career, signing a three-year contract with Swiss Super League side FC Zürich. He made his club debut on 20 July, starting in a 2–0 away win over Yverdon-Sport.

On 3 February 2025, Tošić was loaned to Spanish Segunda División side Deportivo de La Coruña until the end of the season, with a buyout clause.

On 11 September 2025, he went on a season-long loan to Serbian SuperLiga club Čukarički.

He joined Anorthosis Famagusta in a permanent deal in January 2026.

== International career ==
In April 2015, Tošić played two friendlies for the Serbia U18 national team.
