= Raúl Alcaina =

Spanish footballer (born 2000)

Personal information
- Full name: Raúl Alcaina Fenollosa
- Date of birth: 19 July 2000 (age 26)
- Place of birth: Museros, Spain
- Height: 1.81 m (5 ft 11 in)
- Position: Forward

Team information
- Current team: Racing Ferrol
- Number: 20

Youth career
- Torre Levante
- 2018–2019: Levante

Senior career*
Years	Team	Apps	(Gls)
2017–2018	Torre Levante	2	(0)
2018–2022	Levante	57	(11)
2019–2020	→ Castellón (loan)	13	(0)
2022–2024	Alcoyano	52	(11)
2024–2025	Deportivo La Coruña	13	(3)
2024–2025	→ Murcia (loan)	26	(2)
2025–2026	Penafiel	24	(2)
2026–	Racing Ferrol	3	(1)
- * Club domestic league appearances and goals as of 13 September 2026

Raúl Alcaina Fenollosa (born 19 July 2000) is a Spanish professional footballer who plays as a forward for Primera Federación club Racing Ferrol.

== Career ==
Born in Museros, Valencian Community, Alcaina was a youth product of CF Torre Levante. He made his senior debut at the age of 16 on 16 April 2017, playing the last 15 minutes in a 2–0 Tercera División home win over CD Segorbe.

In 2018, after overcoming a knee injury which kept him out for three months, Alcaina moved to Levante UD and returned to the youth setup. On 29 August 2019, after featuring rarely with the reserves in Segunda División B, he was loaned to fellow third division side CD Castellón, for one year.

Upon returning, Alcaina was regularly used with the B-side before departing on 14 June 2022. On 9 July, he signed for Primera Federación side CD Alcoyano.

Alcaina scored nine goals in the 2022–23 campaign, as the Blanquiblaus narrowly avoided relegation. On 30 January 2024, he moved to fellow third division side Deportivo de La Coruña on a two-and-a-half-year deal, and contributed with three goals in 13 appearances as the club achieved promotion to Segunda División.

On 30 August 2024, Alcaina was loaned to Real Murcia CF in the third division, for one year. On 17 July of the following year, he moved abroad for the first time in his career, signing a two-year deal with Liga Portugal 2 side FC Penafiel.
