= Rafael Obrador =

Spanish footballer

Personal information
- Full name: Rafael Obrador Burguera
- Date of birth: 24 February 2004 (age 22)
- Place of birth: Campos, Spain
- Height: 1.80 m (5 ft 11 in)
- Positions: Left-back; left wing-back

Team information
- Current team: Sassuolo (on loan from Benfica)
- Number: 33

Youth career
- 2008–2014: Campos
- 2014–2020: Mallorca
- 2020–2022: Real Madrid

Senior career*
Years	Team	Apps	(Gls)
2019-2020	Mallorca	1	(0)
2022–2025	Real Madrid B	65	(0)
2024–2025	→ Deportivo La Coruña (loan)	33	(0)
2025–2026	Benfica B	2	(0)
2025–	Benfica	1	(0)
2025–2026	→ Torino (loan)	16	(1)
2026–	→ Sassuolo (loan)	0	(0)

International career^{‡}
2018–2019	Spain U15	4	(0)
2019	Spain U16	1	(1)
2021–2022	Spain U18	6	(0)
2022–2023	Spain U19	8	(0)
2025–	Spain U21	6	(1)
- * Club domestic league appearances and goals as of 25 May 2026 ‡ National team caps and goals as of 23:00, 27 March 2026

Rafael "Rafa" Obrador Burguera (born 24 February 2004) is a Spanish professional footballer who plays as a left-back for Serie A club Sassuolo, on loan from Primeira Liga club Benfica.

== Club career ==
=== Mallorca ===
Born in Campos, Mallorca, Balearic Islands, Obrador began playing football at the youth academy of local side Campos at the age of four, and joined Mallorca's youth setup in 2014, aged ten. On 10 October 2019, while still a youth, he signed his first professional contract, agreeing to a deal until 2024.

On 19 July 2020, before even having appeared with the reserves, Obrador made his first team – and La Liga – debut for the Bermellones, coming on as a late substitute for Iddrisu Baba in a 2–2 away draw against Osasuna, as his side was already relegated.

=== Real Madrid ===
On 5 October 2020, Obrador moved to Real Madrid and returned to youth football. He finished his formation in 2022, being promoted to reserve team Real Madrid Castilla ahead of the 2022–23 season.

Obrador immediately became a starter for Raúl's side, as Castilla narrowly missed out promotion.

==== Loan to Deportivo La Coruña ====
On 21 August 2024, Obrador was loaned to Segunda División side Deportivo La Coruña, for one year.

=== Benfica ===
On 11 July 2025, Obrador was signed by Benfica until 2030.

==== Loan to Torino ====
After making just one appearance for Benfica (as well as two appearances for the B-team) during the first half of the season, on 19 January 2026, Obrador was sent on loan to Serie A club Torino until the end of the 2025–26 campaign. The deal included an optional buy-clause, reported to be around €9 million.

==== Loan to Sassuolo ====
On 14 August 2026, Obrador returned to Italy to join Sassuolo on a season-long loan with an option to buy for €7 million.

== International career ==
Obrador represented the Spain under-16s in a 3–3 tie against Mexico on 4 December 2019, where he scored the equalizer.

== Career statistics ==
=== Club ===
As of match played 17 May 2026

Appearances and goals by club, season and competition
Club	Season	League			National cup (Note: Includes Copa del Rey)		League cup		Continental		Other		Total	
Club	Season	Division	Apps	Goals	Apps	Goals	Apps	Goals	Apps	Goals	Apps	Goals	Apps	Goals
Mallorca	2019–20	La Liga	1	0	—		—		—		—		1	0
Real Madrid Castilla	2022–23	Primera Federación	31	0	—		—		—		3 (Note: Appearances in Primera Federación play-offs)	0	34	0
Real Madrid Castilla	2023–24	Primera Federación	34	0	—		—		—		—		34	0
Real Madrid Castilla	Total		65	0	0	0	—		—		3	0	68	0
Deportivo La Coruña (loan)	2024–25	Segunda División	33	0	1	0	—		—		—		34	0
Benfica B	2025–26	Liga Portugal 2	2	0	—		—		—		—		2	0
Benfica	2025–26	Primeira Liga	1	0	0	0	0	0	0	0	0	0	1	0
Torino (loan)	2025–26	Serie A	15	1	1	0	—		—		—		16	1
Career total			117	1	2	0	0	0	0	0	3	0	122	1

== Honours ==
Benfica

- Supertaça Cândido de Oliveira: 2025
