= Bright Ede =

Polish footballer (born 2007)

Personal information
- Date of birth: 18 February 2007 (age 19)
- Place of birth: Warsaw, Poland
- Height: 1.93 m (6 ft 4 in)
- Position: Centre-back

Team information
- Current team: Deportivo A Coruña
- Number: 22

Youth career
- 2014–2022: Delta Warsaw
- 2022–2024: Zagłębie Lubin

Senior career*
Years	Team	Apps	(Gls)
2024–2025	Zagłębie Lubin II	3	(0)
2025–2026	Motor Lublin	17	(1)
2026–	Deportivo A Coruña	4	(0)

International career^{‡}
2024–2025	Poland U18	2	(0)
2025–2026	Poland U19	9	(0)
2026–	Poland U21	2	(0)
- * Club domestic league appearances and goals as of 18:35, 20 September 2026 (UTC) ‡ National team caps and goals as of 12:05, 6 October 2026 (UTC)

Bright Ede (born 18 February 2007) is a Polish professional footballer who plays as a centre-back for La Liga club Deportivo A Coruña.

== Club career ==
=== Early career ===
Born in Warsaw to a Polish mother and a Nigerian father, Ede began his career with hometown side Delta Warsaw before moving to Zagłębie Lubin in 2022. He made his senior debut with the latter's reserve team in the II liga, featuring in three matches before leaving.

=== Motor Lublin ===
On 10 January 2025, Ede moved to Ekstraklasa side Motor Lublin on an eighteen-month contract. He made his debut on 30 March, starting and scoring his team's second in a 4–1 home win over Stal Mielec. In the summer of 2025, he was linked to a move to Chelsea, but the deal never materialized.

=== Deportivo A Coruña ===
On 7 July 2026, Ede signed a five-year deal with La Liga club Deportivo A Coruña, for a rumoured fee of €6 million. He made his debut on 17 August, starting in a 1–1 home draw against Elche on the opening day of the 2026–27 season.

== International career ==
Ede represented Poland at under-18 and under-19 levels.

== Career statistics ==
As of match played 20 September 2026

Appearances and goals by club, season and competition
Club	Season	League			National cup		Total	
Club	Season	Division	Apps	Goals	Apps	Goals	Apps	Goals
Zagłębie Lubin II	2024–25	II liga	3	0	—		3	0
Motor Lublin	2024–25	Ekstraklasa	6	1	0	0	6	1
Motor Lublin	2025–26	Ekstraklasa	11	0	0	0	11	0
Motor Lublin	Total		17	1	0	0	17	1
Deportivo A Coruña	2026–27	La Liga	4	0	0	0	4	0
Career total			24	1	0	0	24	1
