= Óscar Gilsanz =

Spanish football manager (born 1973)

Personal information
- Full name: Óscar Manuel Gilsanz González
- Date of birth: 4 January 1973 (age 53)
- Place of birth: Betanzos, Spain
- Position: Midfielder

Youth career
- Betanzos

Senior career*
Years	Team	Apps	(Gls)
1991–1996	Betanzos	135+	(23+)
1996	Bullense	1	(0)
1997–2004	Betanzos	264	(34)
2004–2005	Sporting Sada		
Total		400+	(57+)

Managerial career
- 1987–2007: Betanzos (youth)
- 2007: Laracha
- 2008–2011: Betanzos
- 2014–2018: Villalbés
- 2018–2019: Laracha
- 2020–2021: Deportivo La Coruña (youth)
- 2021–2024: Deportivo B
- 2024–2025: Deportivo La Coruña
- * Club domestic league appearances and goals

Óscar Manuel Gilsanz González (born 4 January 1973) is a Spanish football manager and former player who played as a midfielder.

== Playing career ==
Gilsanz was born in Betanzos, A Coruña, Galicia, and was a youth product of hometown side Betanzos. After making his first team debut in 1991, he became a regular starter and scored a career-best ten goals in the 1995–96 season.

Gilsanz moved to Bullense in the middle of 1996, before returning to Betanzos the following January. He retired in 2005, aged 32, after a one-year spell at Sporting Sada.

== Managerial career ==
Gilsanz already managed Betanzos' youth sides at the age of 14, and was subsequently in charge of several categories at the club. In July 2007, he left to take over the senior side of Laracha, but was dismissed in November.

Gilsanz returned to Betanzos in 2008, now as manager of the main squad. He led the club to a promotion to Tercera División in 2011, before resigning in October of that year due to "presidential interference".

In 2014, Gilsanz took over fellow fourth division side Villalbés. He renewed his contract with the club on 21 May of the following year, and led the side to the play-offs in 2018. After missing out promotion, he left on 24 June of that year.

On 4 July 2018, Gilsanz returned to Laracha, with the club now being Deportivo La Coruña's farm team. He left in 2019 after their relegation, but returned to Dépor in 2020 as manager of the Juvenil side.

Gilsanz led the side to the 2020–21 División de Honor Juvenil de Fútbol title, and replaced Juan Carlos Valerón at the helm of Deportivo B on 2 July 2021, also renewing his contract for two further seasons. On 9 June 2023, after achieving promotion to Segunda Federación, he agreed to a two-year extension.

On 30 October 2024, Gilsanz became an interim manager of Deportivo's main squad in Segunda División, after the dismissal of Imanol Idiakez. On his first professional match three days later, he led the side to a 5–1 away routing of Cartagena, and was subsequently confirmed as manager of the club until the end of the season on 5 November.

On 9 June 2025, Deportivo announced that Gilsanz ceased to be the first team manager; the club also offered him a role as coordinator of their manager school, which he rejected.

== Personal life ==
Gilsanz comes from a family which owned and founded Empresa Gilsanz, a company which offers transport through private buses. His son Pablo is also a footballer and a midfielder; he too came through at Betanzos.

== Managerial statistics ==
As of 1 June 2025

Managerial record by team and tenure
Team	Nat	From	To	Record								Ref
Team	Nat	From	To	G	W	D	L	GF	GA	GD	Win %	Ref
Laracha	(Spain)	4 July 2007	5 November 2007	11	2	4	5	14	18	−4	18.18	
Betanzos	(Spain)	1 July 2008	20 October 2011	127	73	24	30	217	124	+93	57.48	
Villalbés	(Spain)	1 July 2014	24 June 2018	156	69	48	39	212	148	+64	44.23	
Laracha	(Spain)	4 July 2018	23 May 2019	38	10	10	18	42	49	−7	26.32	
Deportivo B	(Spain)	2 July 2021	30 October 2024	106	47	30	29	156	98	+58	44.34	
Deportivo La Coruña	(Spain)	30 October 2024	9 June 2025	31	11	10	10	45	40	+5	35.48	
Career total				469	212	126	131	686	477	+209	45.20	—

== Honours ==
=== Manager ===
Deportivo La Coruña

- División de Honor Juvenil de Fútbol: 2020–21
