= Dani Barcia =

Spanish footballer (born 2003)

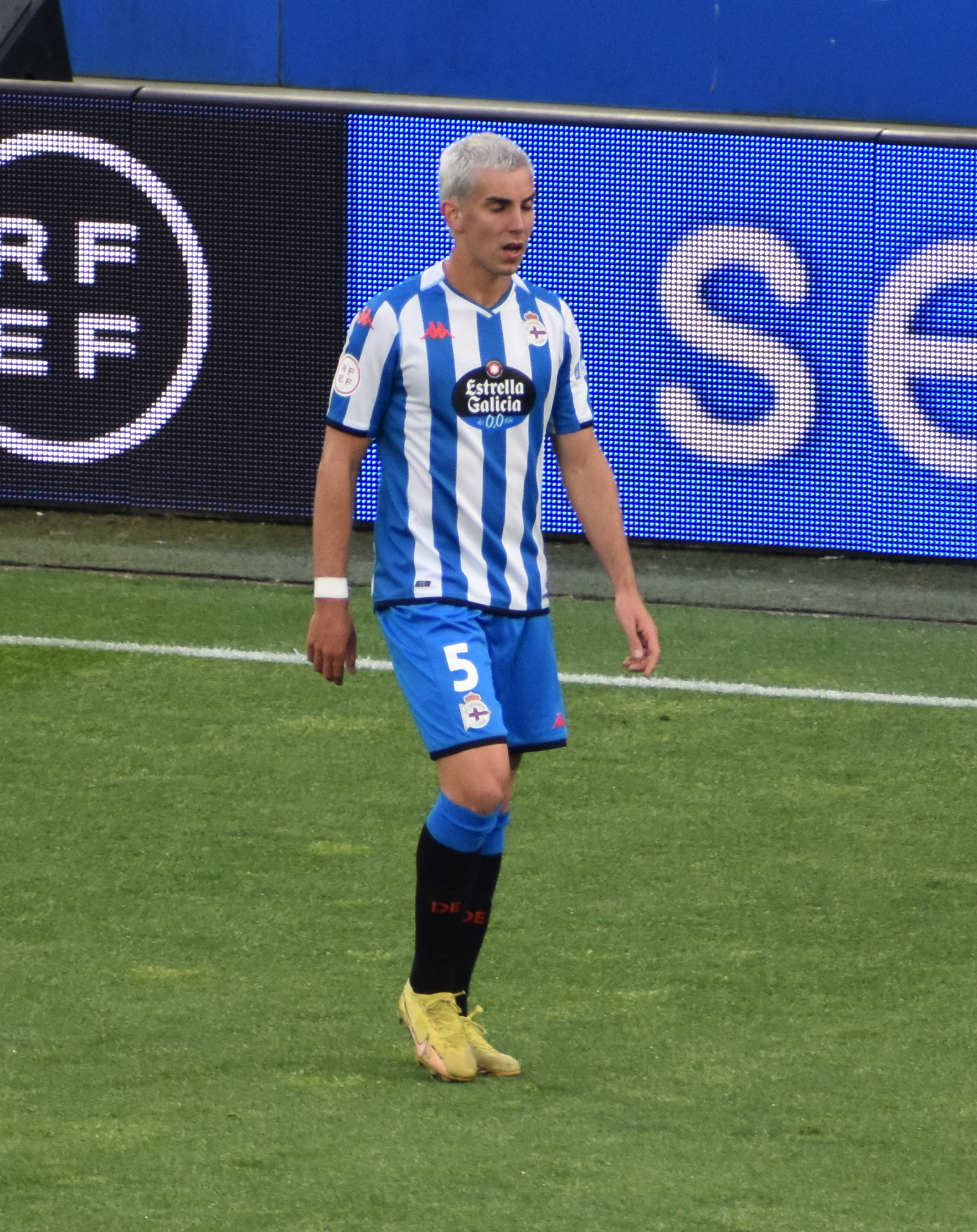
- Barcia playing for Deportivo La Coruña in 2024

Personal information
- Full name: Daniel Barcia Rama
- Date of birth: 19 January 2003 (age 23)
- Place of birth: Cambre, Spain
- Height: 1.86 m (6 ft 1 in)
- Position: Centre-back

Team information
- Current team: Deportivo A Coruña
- Number: 5

Youth career
- San Tirso
- 2011–2021: Deportivo La Coruña

Senior career*
Years	Team	Apps	(Gls)
2021–2023	Deportivo B	57	(4)
2022–	Deportivo A Coruña	53	(2)

International career
2021	Spain U19	6	(0)
- * Club domestic league appearances and goals as of 31 May 2026

Daniel "Dani" Barcia Rama (born 19 January 2003) is a Spanish professional footballer who plays as a centre-back for Deportivo de A Coruña.

== Club career ==
Born in El Temple, Cambre, A Coruña, Galicia, Barcia joined Deportivo de La Coruña's youth sides in 2010, from San Tirso SD. On 8 July 2021, after finishing his formation, he renewed his contract until 2024 and was promoted to the reserves.

Barcia made his senior debut on 12 September 2021, starting in a 0–0 Tercera División RFEF home draw against Racing Club Villalbés, and scored his first goal on 22 December, netting the B's winner in a 2–1 away success over Silva SD. He made his first team debut on 12 November 2022, starting in a 2–0 away loss to CD Guijuelo, for the season's Copa del Rey.

On 22 May 2023, Barcia was definitely promoted to the main squad ahead of the 2023–24 campaign. He further extended his link until 2026 on 20 September, and featured in 16 matches overall during the season as the club achieved promotion to Segunda División as champions.

== International career ==
Barcia represented Spain at under-19 level.

== Honours ==
Deportivo La Coruña

- Primera Federación: 2023–24
