= Pablo Vázquez (footballer, born 1994) =

Spanish footballer (born 1994)

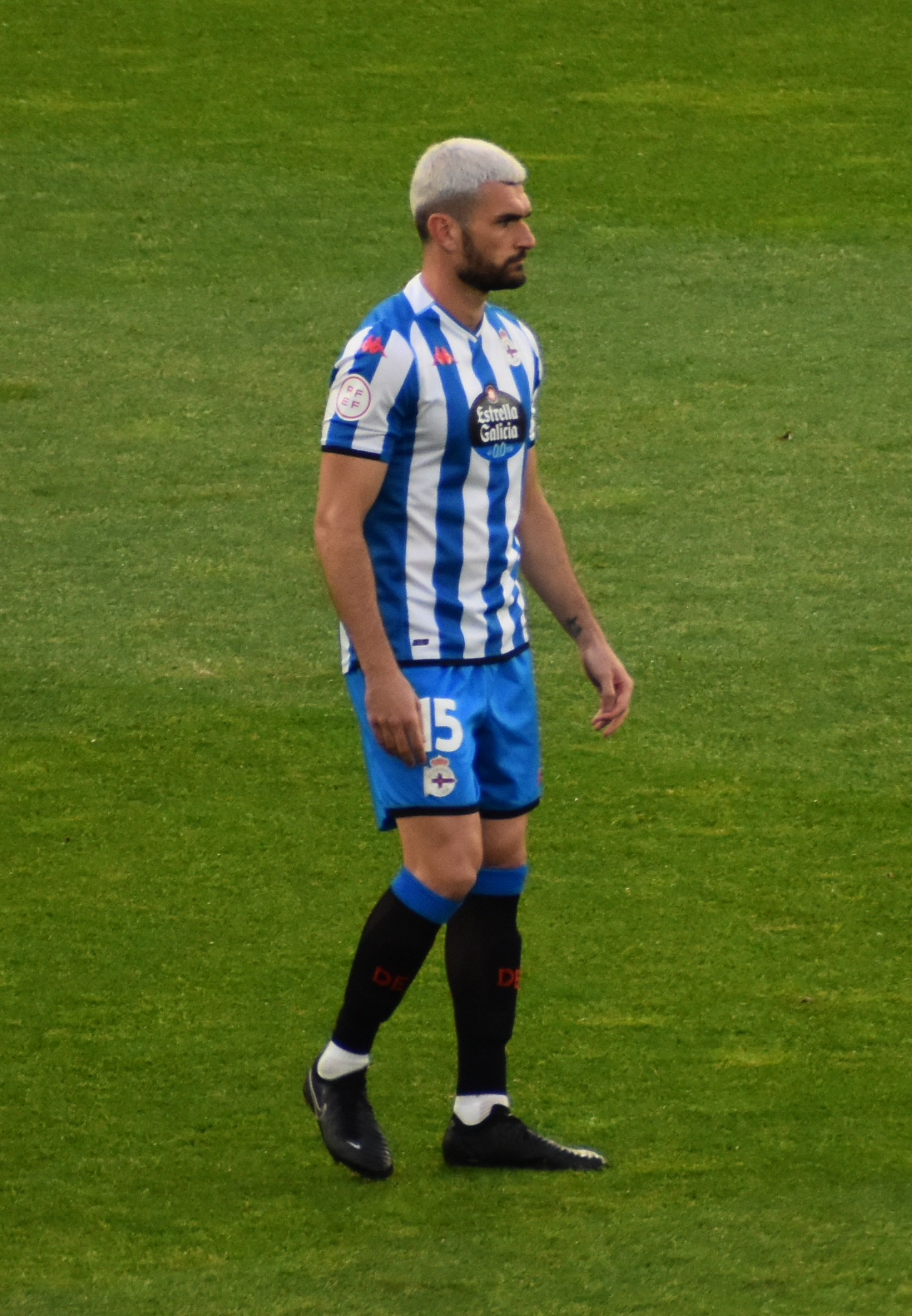
- Vázquez playing for Deportivo La Coruña in 2024

Personal information
- Full name: Pablo Vázquez Pérez
- Date of birth: 7 October 1994 (age 32)
- Place of birth: Gandia, Spain
- Height: 1.84 m (6 ft 0 in)
- Position: Centre back

Team information
- Current team: Sporting Gijón
- Number: 15

Youth career
- 2010–2011: Tavernes
- 2011–2012: Cracks
- 2012–2013: Huracán

Senior career*
Years	Team	Apps	(Gls)
2013–2014	Llosa	15	(1)
2014–2015	Ontinyent	39	(1)
2015–2016	San Fernando	43	(4)
2016–2017	Córdoba B	34	(4)
2016	Córdoba	0	(0)
2017–2018	Granada B	20	(3)
2018	→ Alcorcón (loan)	5	(0)
2018–2019	Granada	8	(1)
2019	→ Cultural Leonesa (loan)	17	(2)
2019–2021	Badajoz	43	(5)
2021–2023	Cartagena	51	(3)
2023–2025	Deportivo La Coruña	78	(6)
2025–	Sporting Gijón	37	(4)
- * Club domestic league appearances and goals as of 6 June 2026

Pablo Vázquez Pérez (born 7 October 1994) is a Spanish footballer, who plays for Sporting de Gijón. Mainly a central defender, he can also play as a defensive midfielder.

== Club career ==
Vázquez was born in Gandia, Valencian Community, and made his senior debut with CD Llosa in 2013, in Tercera División. In June 2014 he moved to fellow league team Ontinyent CF, becoming an immediate first-choice at the club.

On 14 July 2015, Vázquez signed for San Fernando CD also in the fourth division. Roughly one year later, he agreed to a one-year contract with Córdoba CF, being assigned to the reserves in Segunda División B.

Vázquez made his professional debut on 12 October 2016, starting in a 2–1 Copa del Rey away win against Cádiz CF. The following 10 July he moved to another reserve team, Granada CF B in the third division.

On 15 January 2018, Vázquez was loaned to AD Alcorcón in Segunda División, until June. Upon returning, he signed a new two-year contract on 16 August, being definitely promoted to the main squad.

Vázquez scored his first professional goal on 13 September 2018, netting his team's only in a 1–2 loss at Elche CF for the national cup. The following 23 January, after failing to make a league appearance during the first half of the campaign, he was loaned to third division side Cultural y Deportiva Leonesa until June.

On 23 July 2019, upon returning from loan, Vázquez terminated his contract with the Andalusians, and signed for third division side CD Badajoz just hours later. On 18 June 2021, he returned to the second level after agreeing to a one-year deal with FC Cartagena.

On 15 July 2023, Vázquez signed a three-year deal with Deportivo de La Coruña. On 11 July 2025, he moved to Sporting de Gijón on a two-year contract.
