= Germán Parreño =

Spanish footballer

Germán
Personal information
- Full name: Germán Parreño Boix
- Date of birth: 16 February 1993 (age 33)
- Place of birth: Elche, Spain
- Height: 1.89 m (6 ft 2 in)
- Position: Goalkeeper

Team information
- Current team: Deportivo A Coruña
- Number: 1

Youth career
- Elche
- 2007–2012: Espanyol

Senior career*
Years	Team	Apps	(Gls)
2012–2013	Espanyol B	24	(0)
2012–2016	Espanyol	1	(0)
2015	→ Racing Santander (loan)	7	(0)
2015–2016	→ Girona (loan)	0	(0)
2016–2017	Elche	2	(0)
2017–2019	UCAM Murcia	47	(0)
2019–2023	Ibiza	74	(0)
2023–	Deportivo A Coruña	56	(0)
- * Club domestic league appearances and goals as of 31 May 2026

Germán Parreño Boix (born 16 February 1993), known simply as Germán, is a Spanish professional footballer who plays as a goalkeeper for Deportivo de La Coruña.

== Club career ==
Born in Elche, Alicante, Valencian Community, Germán joined RCD Espanyol's youth setup in 2007 from local Elche CF, aged 14. He made his senior debut with the B team in the Tercera División.

On 26 August 2013, Germán signed a new four-year deal with the Catalans, being also promoted to the main squad. On 8 December he played his first game as a professional, starting in a 2–2 away draw against Real Jaén in the round of 32 of the Copa del Rey (eventual 4–2 aggregate win).

Germán first appeared in La Liga on 6 April 2014, taking the place of suspended Kiko Casilla in a 4–1 loss at Sevilla FC. In January 2015, after losing his backup position to another youth graduate, Pau López, he was loaned to Segunda División club Racing de Santander until June.

On 18 August 2015, Germán moved to Girona FC of the same league in a season-long loan deal. He played understudy to Isaac Becerra during his spell, and terminated his contract with Espanyol on 5 August 2016.

On 6 August 2016, Germán returned to his first club Elche. The following summer, he signed for UCAM Murcia CF in the Segunda División B. Two years later, he joined fellow third-tier UD Ibiza, agreeing to a contract until 30 June 2020 with the option for an additional season.

On 1 July 2023, after suffering second-division relegation, Germán signed a two-year deal with Deportivo de La Coruña in the Primera Federación.

== Career statistics ==
As of match played 31 May 2026

Appearances and goals by club, season and competition
Club	Season	League			Copa del Rey		Other		Total	
Club	Season	Division	Apps	Goals	Apps	Goals	Apps	Goals	Apps	Goals
Espanyol B	2012–13	Segunda División B	24	0	—		—		24	0
Espanyol	2012–13	La Liga	0	0	0	0	—		0	0
Espanyol	2013–14	La Liga	1	0	2	0	—		3	0
Espanyol	Total		1	0	2	0	—		3	0
Racing Santander (loan)	2014–15	Segunda División	7	0	—		—		7	0
Girona (loan)	2015–16	Segunda División	0	0	1	0	0	0	1	0
Elche	2016–17	Segunda División	2	0	2	0	—		4	0
UCAM Murcia	2017–18	Segunda División B	19	0	0	0	0	0	19	0
UCAM Murcia	2018–19	Segunda División B	28	0	2	0	—		30	0
UCAM Murcia	Total		47	0	2	0	0	0	49	0
Ibiza	2019–20	Segunda División B	15	0	3	0	1	0	19	0
Ibiza	2020–21	Segunda División B	22	0	3	0	2	0	27	0
Ibiza	2021–22	Segunda División	32	0	0	0	—		32	0
Ibiza	2022–23	Segunda División	5	0	2	0	—		7	0
Ibiza	Total		74	0	8	0	3	0	85	0
Deportivo A Coruña	2023–24	Primera Federación	31	0	1	0	0	0	32	0
Deportivo A Coruña	2024–25	Segunda División	5	0	1	0	—		6	0
Deportivo A Coruña	2025–26	Segunda División	20	0	1	0	—		21	0
Deportivo A Coruña	2026–27	La Liga	0	0	0	0	—		0	0
Deportivo A Coruña	Total		56	0	3	0	0	0	59	0
Career total			211	0	18	0	3	0	232	0
