= Helton Leite =

Brazilian footballer (born 1990)

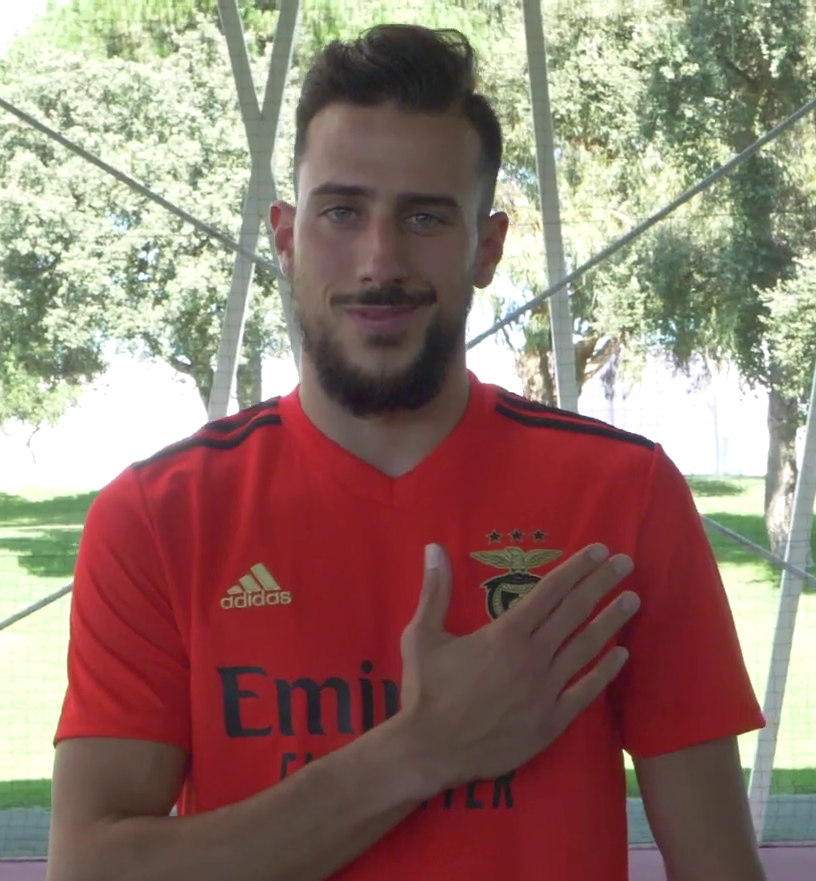
- Leite with Benfica in 2020

Personal information
- Full name: Helton Brant Aleixo Leite
- Date of birth: 2 November 1990 (age 36)
- Place of birth: Belo Horizonte, Brazil
- Height: 1.96 m (6 ft 5 in)
- Position: Goalkeeper

Team information
- Current team: Vila Nova
- Number: 1

Youth career
- Atlético Mineiro
- América Mineiro
- 2007: Goiás
- 2008–2010: Grêmio

Senior career*
Years	Team	Apps	(Gls)
2011	J. Malucelli	1	(0)
2011	Boa Esporte	0	(0)
2012	Ipatinga	23	(0)
2013	Criciúma	11	(0)
2014–2018	Botafogo	25	(0)
2018	→ São Caetano (loan)	10	(0)
2018–2020	Boavista	41	(0)
2020–2023	Benfica	17	(0)
2023–2024	Antalyaspor	51	(0)
2024–2025	Deportivo La Coruña	37	(0)
2025–2026	Fortaleza	4	(0)
2026–	Vila Nova	4	(0)
- * Club domestic league appearances and goals as of 14 April 2026

Helton Brant Aleixo Leite (born 2 November 1990), known as Helton Leite, is a Brazilian professional footballer who plays as a goalkeeper for Vila Nova.

== Career ==
=== Early career ===
Born in Belo Horizonte, Minas Gerais, Leite finished his graduation with Grêmio, but was released in 2010. In 2011, he joined J. Malucelli, making his senior debut on 1 May in a 2–1 home loss against Operário Ferroviário.

Leite subsequently moved to Série B side Boa Esporte, but failed to make any senior appearances for the club. On 19 January 2012, he signed for Ipatinga.

Leite made his professional debut on 7 August 2012, starting in a 2–0 away win against Bragantino. He appeared in 23 league matches during the campaign, which ended in relegation.

On 8 January 2013, Leite joined Criciúma in Série A. He made his debut in the category on 31 July, playing the full 90 minutes in a 1–1 draw at Portuguesa. He would contribute with 11 appearances during the year, again experiencing team relegation.

=== Botafogo ===
On 7 January 2014, Leite was presented at Botafogo. Initially a third-choice behind Jefferson and Renan, he became the second-choice of Sidão when Renan left in 2016 and Jefferson was injured.

Leite was again a backup option in the 2017 campaign, this time behind another new signing, Gatito Fernández. On 14 December of that year, he moved to São Caetano on loan for the ensuing season.

=== Boavista ===
On 12 June 2018, Leite moved abroad for the first time in his career after joining Portuguese Primeira Liga side Boavista. At the club, he was named the Best Goalkeeper during the months of January and February 2020.

=== Benfica ===
On 8 August 2020, Leite agreed to a five-year contract with Benfica.

=== Deportivo La Coruña ===
On 12 August 2024, after an 18-month spell at Turkish Süper Lig side Antalyaspor, Leite signed a two-year deal with Deportivo de La Coruña in the Spanish Segunda División.

== Personal life ==
Helton Leite is the son of former goalkeeper João Leite. He also holds Portuguese citizenship.

== Career statistics ==
As of 17 May 2024

Appearances and goals by club, season and competition
Club	Season	League			State League		National cup		League cup		Continental		Other		Total	
Club	Season	Division	Apps	Goals	Apps	Goals	Apps	Goals	Apps	Goals	Apps	Goals	Apps	Goals	Apps	Goals
J. Malucelli	2011	Paranaense	—		1	0	—		—		—		—		1	0
Boa Esporte	2011	Série B	0	0	—		—		—		—		—		0	0
Ipatinga	2012	Série B	23	0	0	0	0	0	—		—		—		23	0
Criciúma	2013	Série A	11	0	0	0	0	0	—		0	0	—		11	0
Botafogo	2014	Série A	3	0	5	0	0	0	—		0	0	—		8	0
Botafogo	2015	Série B	7	0	0	0	0	0	—		—		—		7	0
Botafogo	2016	Série A	6	0	0	0	5	0	—		—		—		11	0
Botafogo	2017	Série A	1	0	3	0	0	0	—		2 (Note: Appearance(s) in Copa Libertadores)	0	—		6	0
Botafogo	Total		17	0	8	0	5	0	—		2	0	—		32	0
São Caetano	2018	Paulista	—		10	0	1	0	—		—		—		11	0
Boavista	2018–19	Primeira Liga	21	0	—		3	0	1	0	—		—		25	0
Boavista	2019–20	Primeira Liga	20	0	—		1	0	0	0	—		—		21	0
Boavista	Total		41	0	—		4	0	1	0	—		—		46	0
Benfica	2020–21	Primeira Liga	15	0	—		5	0	2	0	4	0	0	0	26	0
Benfica	2021–22	Primeira Liga	2	0	—		3	0	2	0	0	0	—		7	0
Benfica	2022–23	Primeira Liga	0	0	—		1	0	0	0	0	0	—		1	0
Benfica	Total		17	0	—		9	0	4	0	4	0	0	0	34	0
Antalyaspor	2022–23	Süper Lig	17	0	—		—		—		—		—		17	0
Antalyaspor	2023–24	Süper Lig	34	0	—		1	0	—		—		—		35	0
Antalyaspor	Total		51	0	—		1	0	—		—		—		52	0
Career total			160	0	19	0	20	0	5	0	6	0	0	0	210	0

== Honours ==
Criciúma

- Campeonato Catarinense: 2013

Botafogo

- Campeonato Brasileiro Série B: 2015
- Taça Guanabara: 2015
