= Yeremay Hernández =

Spanish footballer

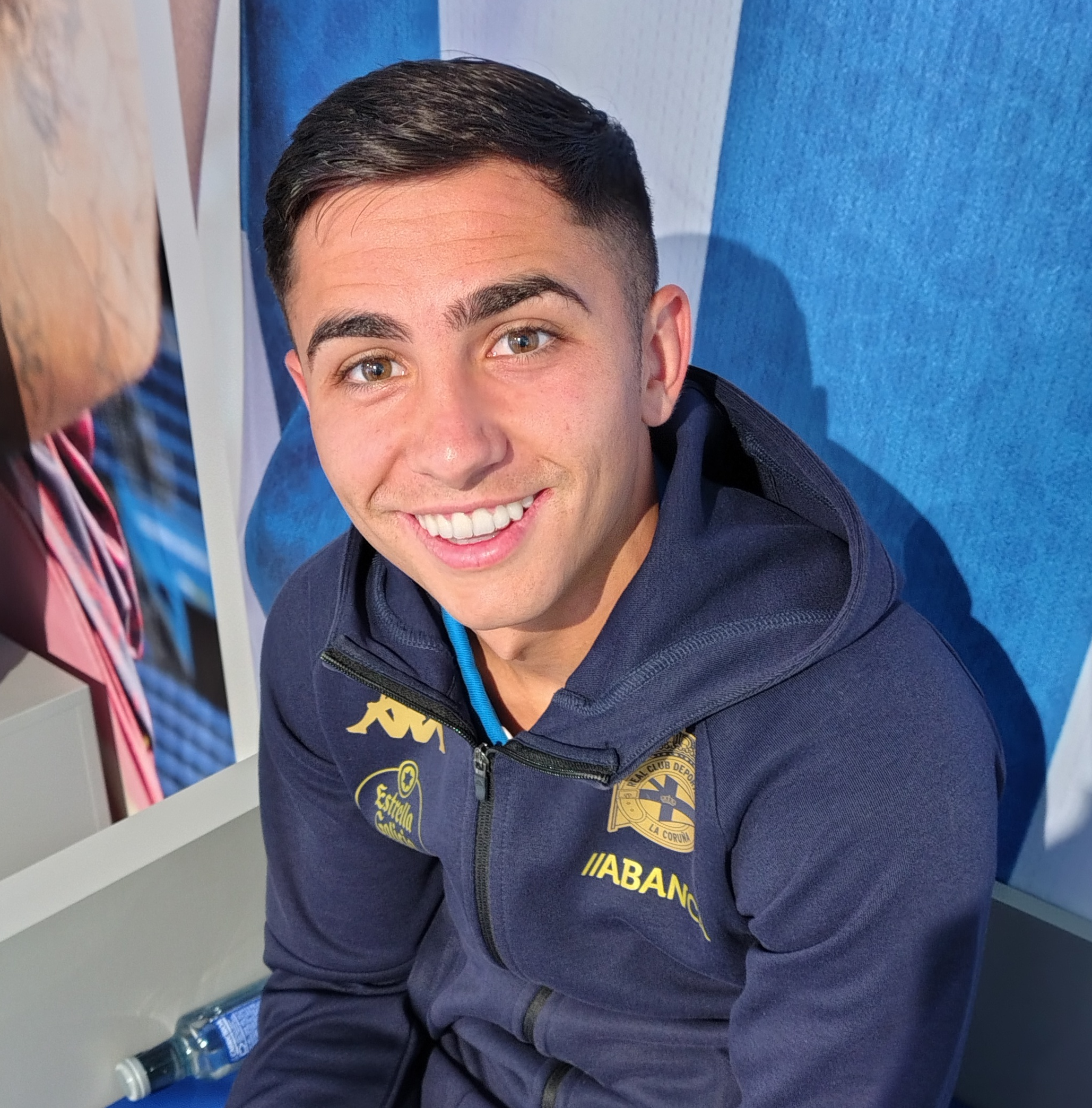
- Yeremay in 2026

Personal information
- Full name: Yeremay Hernández Cubas
- Date of birth: 10 December 2002 (age 23)
- Place of birth: Las Palmas, Spain
- Height: 1.69 m (5 ft 7 in)
- Position: Winger

Team information
- Current team: Deportivo A Coruña
- Number: 10

Youth career
- 2005–2011: Almenara
- 2011–2015: Las Palmas
- 2015–2017: Real Madrid
- 2017–2021: Deportivo La Coruña

Senior career*
| Years | Team | Apps | (Gls) |
| 2021–2023 | Deportivo B | 35 | (8) |
| 2021– | Deportivo A Coruña | 133 | (32) |

International career^{‡}
| 2024– | Spain U21 | 2 | (0) |
- * Club domestic league appearances and goals as of 30 August 2026 ‡ National team caps and goals as of 03:56, 16 October 2024 (UTC)

Yeremay Hernández Cubas (born 10 December 2002), known as Yeremay, is a Spanish professional footballer who plays as a left winger for Deportivo de A Coruña.

== Career ==
Born in Gran Canaria, Canary Islands, Hernández represented UD Almenara and UD Las Palmas before joining Real Madrid's La Fábrica in 2015, aged 12. He left the latter after two years and joined Deportivo de La Coruña, signing his first professional contract with the club on 11 December 2018.

Hernández made his senior debut with the reserves on 13 December 2020, in a 2–1 Tercera División away win over SD Fisterra. He scored his first senior goal the following 7 March, netting Fabril's equalizer in a 3–1 away loss to Polvorín FC.

Hernández made his first team debut with Dépor on 1 December 2021, coming on as a second-half substitute and scoring his team's third in a 4–3 away win over UCAM Murcia CF, for the season's Copa del Rey. He was definitely promoted to the main squad on 1 September 2022, and renewed his link until 2026 on 11 August of the following year.

Hernández further extended his contract with Deportivo until 2030 on 18 April 2024, and finished the 2023–24 campaign with four goals in 26 appearances overall, as the club achieved promotion to Segunda División as champions. He made his professional debut on 17 August 2024, starting in a 1–0 home loss to Real Oviedo.

Hernández scored his first professional goal on 1 September 2024, netting the winner in a 1–0 home success over Racing de Ferrol. He scored 15 goals during that season, including two braces against Albacete Balompié, and renewed his contract until 2030 on 16 June 2025. He also netted a further 11 times in 2025–26 to help the club promote to La Liga.

Hernández made his debut in the main category of Spanish football on 24 August 2026, replacing Luismi Cruz in a 1–1 away draw against Málaga CF.

== Career statistics ==
=== Club ===
As of match played 30 August 2026

Appearances and goals by club, season and competition
| Club | Season | League | | | Copa del Rey | | Other | | Total | |
| Club | Season | Division | Apps | Goals | Apps | Goals | Apps | Goals | Apps | Goals |
|---|---|---|---|---|---|---|---|---|---|---|
| Deportivo B | 2020–21 | Tercera Federación | 17 | 3 | — | | — | | 17 | 3 |
| Deportivo B | 2021–22 | Tercera Federación | 18 | 5 | — | | 1 (Note: Appearance in 2022 Tercera División RFEF play-offs) | 0 | 19 | 5 |
| Deportivo B | Total | | 35 | 8 | — | | 1 | 0 | 36 | 8 |
| Deportivo La Coruña | 2021–22 | Primera Federación | 8 | 0 | 1 | 1 | — | | 9 | 1 |
| Deportivo La Coruña | 2022–23 | Primera Federación | 21 | 2 | 1 | 0 | 2 (Note: Appearances in 2023 Primera Federación play-offs) | 1 | 24 | 3 |
| Deportivo La Coruña | 2023–24 | Primera Federación | 25 | 4 | 1 | 0 | — | | 26 | 4 |
| Deportivo La Coruña | 2024–25 | Segunda División | 39 | 15 | 0 | 0 | — | | 39 | 15 |
| Deportivo La Coruña | 2025–26 | Segunda División | 38 | 11 | 1 | 0 | — | | 39 | 11 |
| Deportivo La Coruña | 2026–27 | La Liga | 2 | 0 | 0 | 0 | — | | 2 | 0 |
| Deportivo La Coruña | Total | | 133 | 32 | 4 | 1 | 2 | 1 | 139 | 34 |
| Career total | | | 168 | 40 | 4 | 1 | 3 | 1 | 175 | 42 |

== Honours ==
Deportivo La Coruña

- Primera Federación: 2023–24
