= Diego Villares =

Spanish footballer

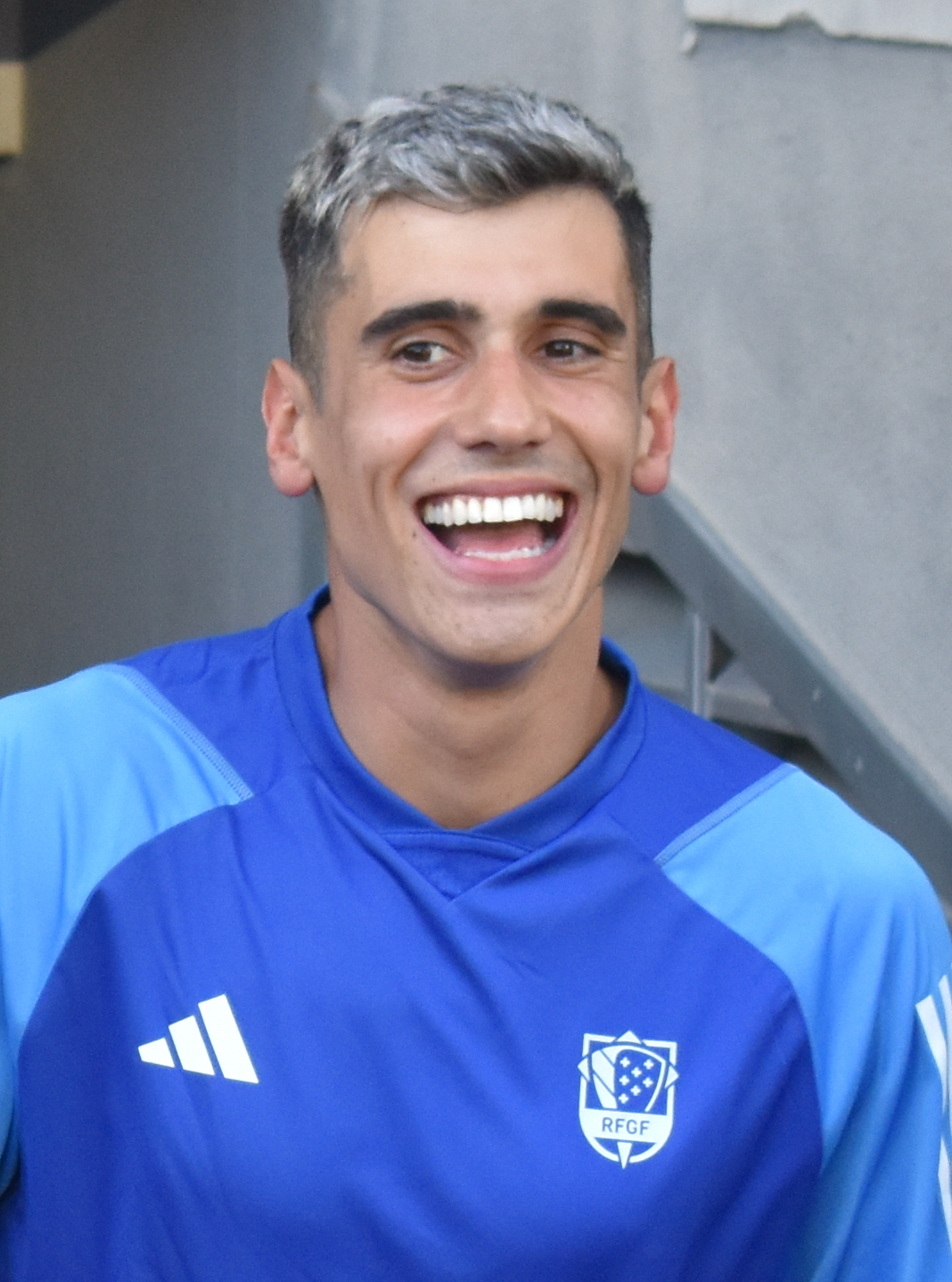
- Villares with Galicia in 2024

Personal information
- Full name: Diego Villares Yáñez
- Date of birth: 17 June 1996 (age 30)
- Place of birth: Vilalba, Spain
- Height: 1.89 m (6 ft 2 in)
- Position: Midfielder

Team information
- Current team: Deportivo A Coruña
- Number: 8

Youth career
- 2006–2015: Racing Villalbés

Senior career*
Years	Team	Apps	(Gls)
2014–2018	Racing Villalbés	128	(15)
2018–2021	Deportivo B	46	(6)
2019	→ Racing Villalbés (loan)	19	(4)
2021–	Deportivo A Coruña	192	(15)

International career
2024	Galicia	1	(0)
- * Club domestic league appearances and goals as of 17 August 2026

Diego Villares Yáñez (born 17 June 1996) is a Spanish professional footballer who plays as a midfielder for Deportivo de A Coruña.

== Career ==
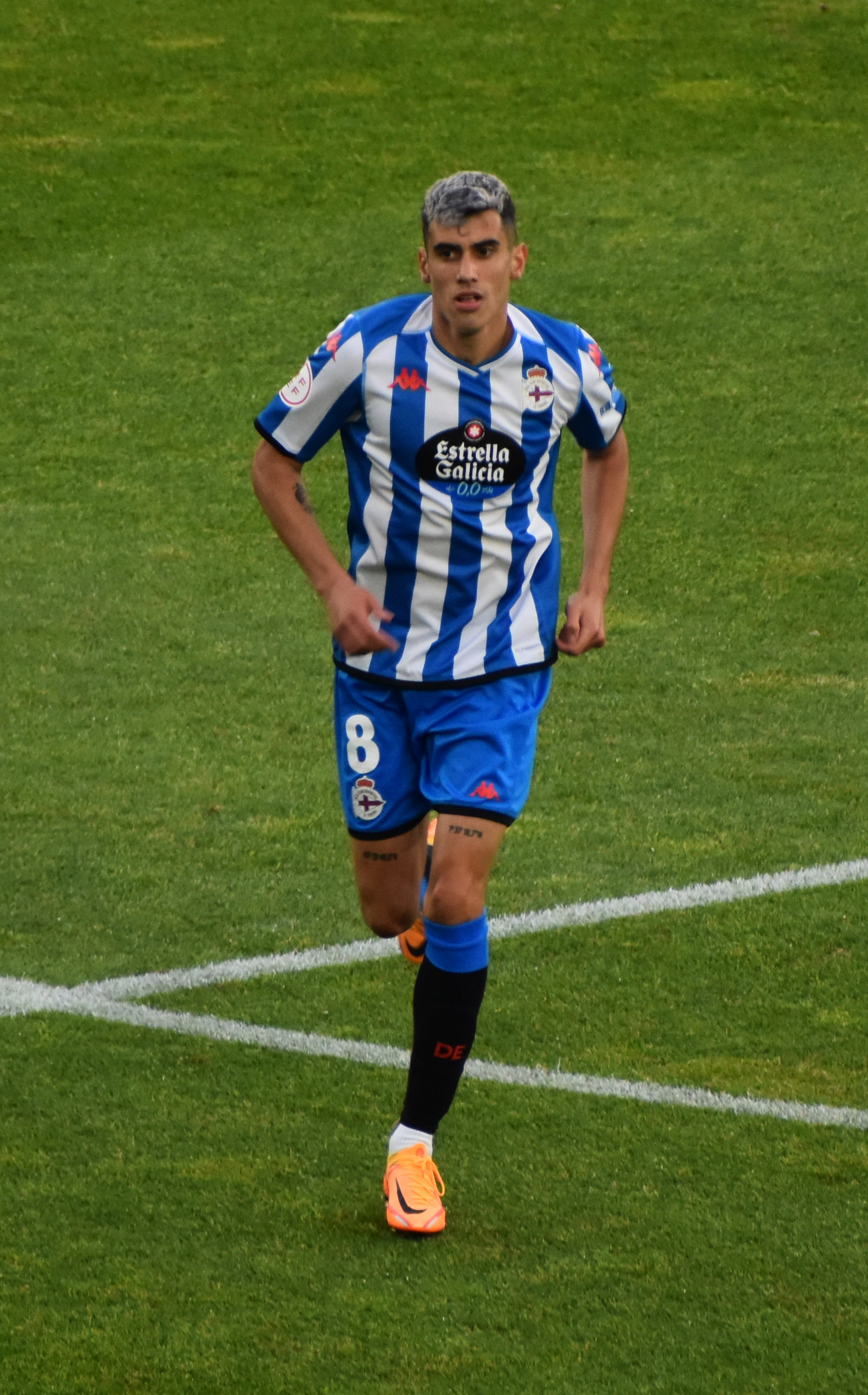
Vilares playing for Deportivo La Coruña in 2024

Born in Samarugo, Vilalba, Lugo, Galicia, Villares was a youth product of hometown side Racing Club Villalbés. He made his first team debut on 27 April 2014, in a 3–2 Tercera División home loss to Alondras CF.

On 31 May 2018, after establishing himself as a first-choice for Villalbés, Villares signed for Deportivo de La Coruña and was assigned to the reserves in Segunda División B. The following 15 January, after being sparingly used, he was loaned back to his former side for the remainder of the season.

Upon returning from loan, Villares established himself as a regular starter for Fabril, before being promoted to the first team now also in the third division on 1 February 2021. He made his debut for Dépor six days later, in a 2–0 away loss to Coruxo FC, and subsequently became a starter for the side.

On 19 May 2022, Villares renewed his contract with Deportivo until 2025. He was an undisputed starter during the 2023–24 campaign, contributing with four goals in 40 matches as the club achieved promotion to Segunda División as champions.

Villares made his professional debut at the age of 28 on 17 August 2024, starting in a 1–0 home loss to Real Oviedo. He scored his first professional goal on 19 December, in a 5–1 home routing of CD Castellón.

Still a first-choice as the club achieved promotion to La Liga in 2026, Villares renewed his contract until 2028 on 10 June of that year. He made his debut in the category on 17 August, coming on as a second-half substitute for Jonathan Asp Jensen in a 1–1 home draw against Elche CF.

== Honours ==
Deportivo La Coruña

- Primera Federación: 2023–24
