= Mario Soriano =

Spanish footballer (born 2002)

Personal information
- Full name: Mario Soriano Carreño
- Date of birth: 22 April 2002 (age 24)
- Place of birth: Alcalá de Henares, Spain
- Height: 1.63 m (5 ft 4 in)
- Position: Winger

Team information
- Current team: Deportivo A Coruña
- Number: 21

Youth career
- 2007–2020: Atlético Madrid

Senior career*
Years	Team	Apps	(Gls)
2019–2021	Atlético Madrid B	23	(1)
2021–2022	Atlético Madrid	0	(0)
2021–2022	→ Deportivo La Coruña (loan)	29	(3)
2022–	Deportivo A Coruña	119	(19)
2023–2024	→ Eibar (loan)	41	(3)

International career
2018–2019	Spain U17	14	(1)
2019–2020	Spain U18	3	(0)
- * Club domestic league appearances and goals as of 17 August 2026

Mario Soriano Carreño (born 22 April 2002) is a Spanish professional footballer who plays as a left winger for Deportivo de A Coruña.

== Club career ==
Born in Alcalá de Henares, Community of Madrid, Soriano joined Atlético Madrid's youth categories in 2007, aged five. He made his senior debut with the reserves on 1 September 2019, coming on as a second-half substitute for Juan Manuel Sanabria in a 3–1 Segunda División B home loss against SCR Peña Deportiva.

On 2 October 2020, Soriano renewed his contract with Atleti until 2024, and made his first team debut the following 6 January, replacing João Félix late into a 1–0 away loss against UE Cornellà, for the season's Copa del Rey. He scored his first goal as a senior on 10 April 2021, netting the B's opener in a 2–0 away win over Villarrubia CF.

On 31 August 2021, Soriano was loaned to Primera División RFEF side Deportivo de La Coruña for one year. Regularly used as the club narrowly missed out promotion in the play-offs, he signed a permanent two-year contract with Dépor on 19 July 2022.

On 14 July 2023, Deportivo announced Soriano's departure after the player opted to refuse the club's renewal offer. Three days later, Segunda División side SD Eibar announced his signing on a one-year loan deal.

Soriano made his professional debut on 12 August 2023, starting in a 4–0 away loss against Racing de Santander. He scored his first goal seven days later, netting the winner in a 2–1 home success over Elche CF.

Back to Dépor in 2024, Soriano renewed his contract until 2028 in June of that year, and was a first-choice as the club achieved promotion to La Liga in 2026. He made his top tier debut on 17 August of that year, starting in a 1–1 home draw against Elche.
