= 2026–27 Málaga CF season =

Málaga CF
2026–27 season
- Owner: Abdullah Al Thani
- President: José María Muñoz (Administrador Judicial)
- Head coach: Juan Francisco Funes
- Stadium: La Rosaleda
- La Liga: 20th
- Copa del Rey: First round
Home colours	Away colours	Third colours

The 2026–27 season is the 123rd season in the history of Málaga CF, and the club's first season back in La Liga. In addition to the domestic league, the club is participating in the Copa del Rey.

== First-team squad ==
As of 20 September 2026

Note: Flags indicate national team as defined under FIFA eligibility rules; some limited exceptions apply. Players may hold more than one non-FIFA nationality.

No.	Pos.	Nation	Player
1	GK	ESP	Alfonso Herrero (vice-captain)
2	MF	SWE	Jens Cajuste (on loan from Napoli)
3	DF	ESP	Carlos Puga
4	DF	ESP	Einar Galilea
5	DF	ESP	Álex Pastor
6	MF	ESP	Ramón (captain)
7	MF	MAR	Haitam
8	MF	ESP	Carlos Dotor (on loan from Celta)
9	FW	ESP	Chupete
10	MF	ESP	David Larrubia
11	MF	ESP	Joaquín Muñoz
12	DF	ESP	José Salinas (on loan from Espanyol)
13	GK	ESP	Carlos López
14	MF	ESP	Rafa

No.	Pos.	Nation	Player
15	DF	ESP	Ángel Recio
16	DF	ESP	Diego Murillo
17	FW	ESP	Eneko Jauregi
18	MF	ESP	Pablo Martínez
19	MF	ESP	Juan Cruz (on loan from Leganés)
20	DF	ESP	Fernando Calero
21	FW	ESP	Adrián Niño
22	MF	ESP	Dani Lorenzo
23	MF	ESP	Izan Merino
24	MF	ESP	Julen Lobete
25	DF	ESP	Juan Berrocal
31	DF	ESP	Rafita
35	MF	IRL	Aarón Ochoa
39	DF	MAR	Adam Aznou (on loan from Everton)

=== Out on loan ===
Note: Flags indicate national team as defined under FIFA eligibility rules; some limited exceptions apply. Players may hold more than one non-FIFA nationality.

No.	Pos.	Nation	Player
—	DF	ESP	Pablo Arriaza (at Estepona until 30 June 2027)

== Transactions ==
=== Transfers in ===
Date	Pos.	Nat.	Name	Club	Fee	Ref.
14 July 2026	DF	(Spain)	Fernando Calero	Free agent		
21 August 2026	MF	(Spain)	Pablo Martínez	Free agent		
1 September 2026	DF	(Spain)	Juan Berrocal	Free agent		

=== Loans in ===
Date	Pos.	Nat.	Name	Club	Duration	Ref.
19 July 2026	MF	(Spain)	Juan Cruz	(Spain) CD Leganés	End of season	
21 July 2026	MF	(Spain)	Carlos Dotor	(Spain) Celta	End of season	
27 July 2026	MF	(Spain)	José Salinas	(Spain) RCD Espanyol	End of season	
31 August 2026	DF	(Morocco)	Adam Aznou	(England) Everton	End of season	
1 September 2026	MF	(Sweden)	Jens Cajuste	(Italy) Napoli	End of season	

=== Transfers out ===
Date	Pos.	Nat.	Name	Club	Fee	Ref.
3 July 2026	DF	(Spain)	Jokin Gabilondo	(Spain) Real Zaragoza	Transfer	
29 August 2026	MF	(Spain)	Javi Montero	(Spain) CD Leganés	Transfer	

== Competitions ==
=== La Liga ===
==== League table ====
Pos	Team	Pld	W	D	L	GF	GA	GD	Pts	Qualification or relegation
16	Osasuna	12	3	3	6	12	23	−11	12	
17	Levante	12	2	5	5	16	21	−5	11	
18	Elche	12	2	4	6	14	20	−6	10	Relegation to Segunda División
19	Valencia	12	2	3	7	8	20	−12	9	Relegation to Segunda División
20	Málaga	12	0	5	7	9	23	−14	5	Relegation to Segunda División

Updated to match(es) played on 8 November 2026. Source: LaLiga EA Sports
Rules for classification: 1) Points; 2) Head-to-head points; 3) Head-to-head goal difference; 4) Goal difference; 5) Goals scored; 6) Fair-play points (if three or more teams tied); 7) Play-off at neutral site.
(Note: Head-to-head record is used only after all the matches between the teams in question have been played)

==== Matches ====
19 August 2026 1	Atlético Madrid	2–0	Málaga CF	Madrid
21:00 CEST (UTC+2)	Hancko (yellow card) 15'; Domínguez (yellow card) 37'; Lee Kang-in 70'; Baena 85'	Report	Puga (yellow card) 45+4'; Cruz (yellow card) 80'; Ramón (yellow card) 88'	Stadium: Riyadh Air Metropolitano; Attendance: 65,785; Referee: Adrián Cordero Vega

24 August 2026 2	Málaga CF	1–1	Deportivo La Coruna	Málaga
21:30 CEST (UTC+2)	Chupete 34' (pen.); Larrubia (yellow card) 61'		Aubameyang 21'; Soriano (yellow card) 25'; Quagliata (yellow card) 57'; Navarro (yellow card) 79'; Nsongo (yellow card) 89'	Stadium: Estadio La Rosaleda; Attendance: 29,014; Referee: Javier Alberola Rojas

30 August 2026 3	Real Madrid	4–0	Málaga CF	Madrid
17:00 CEST (UTC+2)	Bellingham 19'; Herrero 26' (o.g.); Mbappé 30'; Güler 90+1'	Report	Chupete (yellow card) 66'; Enríquez (yellow card) 90+3'	Stadium: Bernabéu; Attendance: 74,799; Referee: Juan Martínez Munuera

6 September 2026 4	Málaga CF	0–0	Levante	Málaga
18:30 CEST (UTC+2)	Chupete (penalty missed) 9'; Lorenzo (yellow card) 25'; Rafita (yellow card) 34'; Martínez (yellow card) 45+1'; Puga (yellow card) 90+2'		Dela (yellow card) 70'; Mandi (yellow card) 90+5'	Stadium: Estadio La Rosaleda; Attendance: 29,264; Referee: Luis Bestard Servera

13 September 2026 5	Celta Vigo	1–1	Málaga CF	Vigo
14:00 CEST (UTC+2)	Lago (yellow card) 26'; Jutglà 41'		Galilea (yellow card) 24'; Niño 83'	Stadium: Balaídos Stadium; Attendance: 18,575; Referee: Carlos Muñiz Muñoz

17 September 2026 6	Málaga CF	1–3	Villarreal	Málaga
21:30 CEST (UTC+2)	Dotor 12'; Salinas (yellow card) 34'; Larrubia (yellow card) 68'; Galilea (yellow card) 70'; Enríquez (yellow card) 79'; Herrero (yellow card) 85'		Moleiro 40'; Akhomach (yellow card) 42'; Gueye 45+2', 86' (pen.)	Stadium: Estadio La Rosaleda; Attendance: 28,505; Referee: Miguel Ángel Ortiz Arias

20 September 2026 7	Getafe	1–0	Málaga CF	Getafe
14:00 CEST (UTC+2)	Mojica (yellow card) 21'; Gudelj (yellow card) 54'; Serrano (yellow card) 59'; Terrats (yellow card) 68'; Azón 85'	Report	Jauregi (yellow card) 39'; Larrubia (yellow card) 45+5'	Stadium: Estadio Coliseum; Attendance: 7,910; Referee: Javier Alberola Rojas

9 October 2026 8	Málaga CF	1–1	Espanyol	Málaga
21:00 CEST (UTC+2)	Puga (yellow card) 28'; Chupete (yellow card) 41'; Dotor (yellow card) 66'; Aznou (yellow card) 89'; Niño 90+3'		Zaragoza 13', (yellow card) 28'; Hernández (yellow card) 24'; El Hilali (yellow card) 60'; Riedel (yellow card) 84'; Hinojo (yellow card) 87'	Stadium: Estadio La Rosaleda; Attendance: 28,167; Referee: Francisco José Hernández Maeso

18 October 2026 9	Málaga	2–5	Real Sociedad	Málaga
16:30 CEST (UTC+2)	Niño 54'; Martínez 66'		Kubo 3'; Óskarsson 26'; Martín (yellow card) 37'; Oyarzabal 59', 67'; Sarr (yellow card) 62'; Guedes 73'	Stadium: La Rosaleda; Attendance: 27,935; Referee: Luis Bestard Servera

23 October 2026 10	Deportivo Alavés	1–1	Málaga CF	Vitoria-Gasteiz
21:00 CEST (UTC+2)	Boyé (yellow card) 39'; Tenaglia (yellow card) 67'; Mañas 89'	Report	Niño 44+1'; Dotor (yellow card) 84'	Stadium: Mendizorrotza Stadium; Attendance: 16,099; Referee: Carlos Muñiz Muñoz

1 November 2026 11	Real Betis	2–1	Málaga	Seville
18:30 CET (UTC+1)	Bartra 38'; Fornals 45+2'; Deossa (yellow card) 90+1'; Ruibal (yellow card) 90+2'		Larrubia (yellow card) 20'; Rafita (yellow card) 38'; Niño 68'	Stadium: La Cartuja; Attendance: 64,119; Referee: Mateo Busquets Ferrer

7 November 2026 12	Málaga CF	1–2	Racing	Málaga
13:00 CET (UTC+1)	Dotor 28', (yellow card) 90'; Aznou (yellow card) 38' (yellow-red card) 64'; Galilea (yellow card) 45+1'; Niño (yellow card) 76'; Chupete (yellow card) 80'	Report	Agirrezabala (yellow card) 31'; Luque 50'; Zabiri 60'; Guliashvili (yellow card) 90+1'	Stadium: Estadio La Rosaleda; Attendance: 28,334; Referee: Isidro Díaz de Mera

22 November 2026 13	CA Osasuna	v	Málaga CF

29 November 2026 14	Málaga CF	v	Athletic Bilbao

6 December 2026 15	Sevilla FC	v	Málaga CF

13 December 2026 16	FC Barcelona	v	Málaga CF

20 December 2026 17	Rayo Vallecano	v	Málaga CF

3 January 2027 18	Málaga CF	v	Elche CF

10 January 2027 19	Valencia CF	v	Málaga CF

17 January 2027 20	Málaga CF	v	Real Madrid CF

24 January 2027 21	Real Sociedad	v	Málaga CF

31 January 2027 22	Málaga CF	v	Deportivo Alavés

7 February 2027 23	Deportivo de A Coruña	v	Málaga CF

14 February 2027 24	Levante UD	v	Málaga CF

21 February 2027 25	Málaga CF	v	Real Betis

28 February 2027 26	Málaga CF	v	Atlético Madrid

7 March 2027 27	Elche CF	v	Málaga CF

14 March 2027 28	Málaga CF	v	Rayo Vallecano

21 March 2027 29	Villarreal CF	v	Málaga CF

4 April 2027 30	CA Osasuna	v	Málaga CF

11 April 2027 31	RCD Espanyol	v	Málaga CF

18 April 2027 32	Málaga CF	v	Valencia CF

21 April 2027 33	Racing de Santander	v	Málaga CF

2 May 2027 34	Málaga CF	v	Getafe CF

9 May 2027 35	Athletic Bilbao	v	Málaga CF

16 May 2027 36	Málaga CF	v	RC Celta de Vigo

23 May 2027 37	FC Barcelona	v	Málaga CF

30 May 2027 38	Málaga CF	v	Sevilla FC

=== Copa del Rey ===
27 October 2026	Sporting de Alcázar	0–3	Málaga	Alcázar de San Juan
21:00		Report	Chupe 71' (pen.), 80'; Lorenzo 88'	Stadium: Estadio Municipal
