= Carlos López (footballer, born 2004) =

Spanish association football player

Personal information
- Full name: Carlos López Nogueras
- Date of birth: 13 November 2004 (age 21)
- Place of birth: Málaga, Spain
- Height: 1.83 m (6 ft 0 in)
- Position: Goalkeeper

Team information
- Current team: Málaga
- Number: 13

Youth career
- 2009–2018: Málaga
- 2018–2019: San Félix
- 2019–2020: Málaga
- 2020–2021: San Félix
- 2021: Málaga

Senior career*
Years	Team	Apps	(Gls)
2021–2023	Málaga B	51	(0)
2023–	Málaga	1	(0)
- * Club domestic league appearances and goals as of 1 June 2025

Carlos López Nogueras (born 13 November 2004) is a Spanish professional footballer who plays as a goalkeeper for Málaga CF.

== Career ==
López was born in Málaga, Andalusia, and was a Málaga CF youth graduate. He made his senior debut with the reserves on 31 October 2021, starting in a 1–0 Tercera División RFEF away win over Alhaurín de la Torre CF.

In June 2023, after establishing himself as a regular starter for the B-team, López was promoted to the main squad to act as a backup option. A backup to Alfonso Herrero, he made his first team debut on 1 November, starting in a 0–0 away draw against Barakaldo CF, for the season's Copa del Rey, saving two penalties in the shoot-out as the club won 4–2.

On 13 December 2023, López renewed his contract with the Blanquiazules until 2027. He featured in a further two matches during the campaign, both in the cup, as the club achieved promotion to Segunda División.

Still a backup to Herrero, López further extended his link until 2029 on 4 February 2025. He made his professional debut on 1 June, starting in a 2–2 home draw against Burgos CF.

== Career statistics ==
As of match played 3 June 2026

Appearances and goals by club, season and competition
Club	Season	League			National Cup		Other		Total	
Club	Season	Division	Apps	Goals	Apps	Goals	Apps	Goals	Apps	Goals
Málaga B	2021–22	Tercera División RFEF	23	0	—		1 (Note: Appearance(s) in promotion playoffs)	0	24	0
Málaga B	2022–23	Tercera Federación	28	0	—		4	0	32	0
Málaga B	Total		51	0	—		5	0	56	0
Málaga	2022–23	Segunda División	0	0	0	0	—		0	0
Málaga	2023–24	Primera Federación	0	0	3	0	0	0	3	0
Málaga	2024–25	Segunda División	1	0	1	0	—		2	0
Málaga	2025–26	Segunda División	0	0	2	0	0	0	2	0
Málaga	2026–27	La Liga	0	0	0	0	—		0	0
Málaga	Total		1	0	6	0	0	0	7	0
Career total			52	0	6	0	5	0	63	0
