= Juan Funes =

Juan Funes may refer to:

- Juan Francisco Funes (born 1983), Spanish football manager and former player
- Juan Gilberto Funes (1963–1992), Argentine footballer
- Juan Manuel Funes (born 1966), Guatemalan footballer
