= Rafita =

Rafita may refer to:

- Rafita (footballer, born 1982), Spanish footballer
- Rafita (footballer, born 2004), Spanish footballer
- 1644 Rafita, a stony asteroid of the asteroid belt
- Rafita family, an asteroid family
