= Moayad Shatat =

Jordanian businessman (born 1984)

- Born: 28/07/1984; Qatar
- Education: Degree in Economic Science
- Occupation: Director of the Elche CF Project with Skyline International

Moayad Shatat (born 28 July 1984, Qatar) is a Jordanian businessman, who has links to the world of football, particularly the Spanish League. He served as vice president with Málaga CF and in 2016 was selected by Skyline International, part of a business investment group, to manage the project designed for Elche CF. Following the investment made with the group's international capital into Elche CF, Shatat will take up the role of Executive Chairman of the entity.

== Professional career ==
After graduating with a degree in Economic Sciences in 2005 from the University of Applied Sciences in Amman, Jordan, he began working on the supervision and development of major projects in the United Arab Emirates and Qatar.

In 2015, Moayad Shatat was named ‘Honorary Consul’ of the Parliament of Brazil for the Middle East. In February 2016, he received a ‘Doctor Honoris Causa’ title in International Business and Finance, by the Charisma International University.

== Málaga CF ==
Shatat was appointed by the owner of Málaga CF, Abdullah bin Naser Al Thani, as vice president of the entity in 2012. Shatat remained in this role until his resignation in 2015. The executive joined the club during a full institutional crisis, and through a profound economic restructuring, was able to implement a sustainable management model, adapting to the new regulation of financial control.

With Shatat as vice president, Málaga CF reached the quarter-finals of the Champions League in 2012.

== Elche CF ==
Shatat currently holds the position of director of the Elche CF Project, that Skyline International has designed for the club. The Jordanian businessman will serve as Executive Chairman, once the international group has finalised their majority ownership of the Football Club.
