= 2024–25 Málaga CF season =

Málaga CF
2024–25 season
- Owner: Abdullah Al Thani
- President: José María Muñoz (Administrador Judicial)
- Head coach: Sergio Pellicer
- Stadium: La Rosaleda
- Segunda División: 16th
- Copa del Rey: First round
- Top goalscorer: League: Dioni (7); All: Dioni (7)
- Average home league attendance: 24,857
Home colours	Away colours	Third colours

The 2024–25 season was the 121st season in the history of Málaga CF, and the club's first season back in the Segunda División. In addition to the domestic league, the club participated in the Copa del Rey.

== Transfers ==
=== Summer ===
==== In (Loans) ====
Date	Pos.	Player	From	Fee	Ref.
First team
11 July 2024	CB	(Spain) Álex Pastor	FC Andorra	Free	
19 July 2024	DM	(Spain) Luismi Sánchez	(Spain) Real Oviedo	Free	
22 July 2024	CF	(Croatia) Roko Baturina	(Portugal) Gil Vicente	Free	
2 August 2024	LW	(Spain) Julen Lobete	(Spain) Celta de Vigo	Free	
20 August 2024	CF	(Spain) Sergio Castel	(Cyprus) Anothorsis	Free (Note: His contract was later terminated mutually of the 3rd of February.)	
29 August 2024	LW	(France) Yanis Rahmani	(Spain) Eibar	Free	

== Friendlies ==
=== Pre-season ===
27 July 2024 Friendly	Málaga	0–1	Almería

2 August 2024 Friendly	Málaga	1–0	Al Jazira

10 August 2024 Friendly	Málaga	2–0	Córdoba

== Competitions ==
=== Overall record ===
Competition	First match	Last match	Starting round	Final position	Record							
Competition	First match	Last match	Starting round	Final position	Pld	W	D	L	GF	GA	GD	Win %
Segunda División	17 August 2024	31 May 2025	Matchday 1	16th	42	12	17	13	42	46	−4	28.57
Copa del Rey	31 October 2024		First round	First round	1	0	0	1	2	3	−1	0.00
Total					43	12	17	14	44	49	−5	27.91

Source: Soccerway

=== Segunda División ===
==== League table ====
Pos	Team	Pld	W	D	L	GF	GA	GD	Pts
14	Córdoba	42	14	13	15	59	63	−4	55 (Note: Burgos finished ahead of Cádiz and Córdoba on head-to-head points: Burgos 6 pts, Cádiz 5 pts, Córdoba 4 pts.)
15	Deportivo La Coruña	42	13	14	15	56	54	+2	53 (Note: Deportivo La Coruña finished ahead of Málaga and Castellón on head-to-head points: Deportivo La Coruña 6 pts, Málaga 5 pts, Castellón 4 pts.)
16	Málaga	42	12	17	13	42	46	−4	53
17	Castellón	42	14	11	17	65	63	+2	53
18	Zaragoza	42	13	12	17	56	63	−7	51

Source: LaLiga Hypermotion
Rules for classification: 1) Points; 2) Head-to-head points; 3) Head-to-head goal difference; 4) Goal difference; 5) Goals scored; 6) Fair-play points
(Note: Head-to-head record is used only after all the matches between the teams in question have been played)

==== Results summary ====
Overall								Home						Away					
Pld	W	D	L	GF	GA	GD	Pts	W	D	L	GF	GA	GD	W	D	L	GF	GA	GD
42	12	17	13	42	46	−4	53	10	7	4	22	16	+6	2	10	9	20	30	−10

Source: La Liga Hypermotion

==== Matches ====
The match schedule was released on 26 June 2024.

17 August 2024 1	Racing Ferrol	2–2	Málaga	Ferrol
17:00				Stadium: Estadio Municipal da Malata

31 August 2024 3	Málaga	2–1	Albacete	Málaga
21:30				Stadium: La Rosaleda

7 September 2024 4	Córdoba	0–0	Málaga	Córdoba
21:00				Stadium: Estadio Nuevo Arcángel

14 September 2024 5	Málaga	1–0	Huesca	Málaga
18:30				Stadium: La Rosaleda

20 September 2024 6	Granada	2–2	Málaga	Granada
20:30				Stadium: Nuevo Estadio de Los Cármenes

28 September 2024 7	Málaga	v	Elche	Málaga
21:00				Stadium: La Rosaleda
