= Aaron Ochoa =

Spanish-Irish footballer (born 2007)

Personal information
- Full name: Aaron Ochoa Moloney
- Date of birth: 18 April 2007 (age 19)
- Place of birth: Marbella, Spain
- Height: 1.67 m (5 ft 6 in)
- Position: Midfielder

Team information
- Current team: Málaga
- Number: 35

Youth career
- 2014–2016: CD Peña Los Compadres
- 2016–2021: Málaga
- 2021–2022: San Félix
- 2022–2023: Málaga

Senior career*
| Years | Team | Apps | (Gls) |
| 2023–2024 | Atlético Malagueño | 14 | (1) |
| 2023– | Málaga | 56 | (2) |

International career^{‡}
| 2023 | Republic of Ireland U16 | 5 | (1) |
| 2023–2024 | Republic of Ireland U17 | 8 | (0) |
| 2024–2025 | Republic of Ireland U19 | 12 | (1) |
| 2026– | Republic of Ireland U21 | 1 | (0) |
- * Club domestic league appearances and goals as of 20 June 2026 ‡ National team caps and goals as of 18:04, 31 March 2026 (UTC)

Aaron Ochoa Moloney (born 18 April 2007) is a Spanish-Irish footballer who plays as a midfielder for Spanish club Málaga CF. Born in Spain, he represents the Republic of Ireland at under-21 international level.

== Club career ==
Born in Marbella, Málaga, Andalusia, Ochoa began playing football with CD Peña Los Compadres, a club from his hometown. In 2016, at the age of nine, he joined Málaga CF's youth setup, where he became part of La Academia MCF. He progressed through the club's youth teams, and in the 2022–23 season was part of the Málaga Cadete A side which won the División de Honor Cadete.

During the 2023–24 season, Ochoa alternated between Atlético Malagueño and the first team. He made his senior debut with the reserves on 22 October 2023, coming on as a second-half substitute in a 2–1 Tercera Federación home loss to Juventud de Torremolinos CF.

On 6 December 2023, Ochoa made his first-team debut for Málaga in a Copa del Rey match against CD Eldense at La Rosaleda. He replaced the injured Juan Hernández during the first half of the match, which ended in a 1–0 win for Málaga. Aged 16 years, seven months and 18 days, he became the second-youngest player to debut for the club, behind only Fabrice Olinga.

He scored his first goal for Atlético Malagueño on 25 February 2024, netting the opener in a 5–0 home win over CD Torreperogil in Tercera Federación. On 17 April 2024, he renewed his contract with Málaga until 2027.

In the same campaign, Ochoa made appearances for the first team during the season in which Málaga achieved promotion to Segunda División. The club secured promotion on 22 June 2024, after a 2–2 draw against Gimnàstic de Tarragona in the second leg of the promotion play-off final.

In the 2024–25 season, Ochoa made his professional debut in Segunda División, starting in Málaga's 2–2 away draw against Racing de Ferrol on 17 August 2024.

During the 2025–26 campaign, he continued to gain presence in the first team. On 30 October 2025, he scored his first official goal for Málaga, in a Copa del Rey match against CD Estepona, and on 2 February 2026 he scored his first league goal for the club, against CD Mirandés. One week later, he extended his contract with Málaga until 30 June 2029.

That season, he was part of the squad which achieved promotion to La Liga. On 20 June 2026, Málaga defeated UD Almería 2–1 in the second leg of the promotion play-off final and returned to the top tier of Spanish football.

== International career ==
Of Irish descent, Ochoa has represented the Republic of Ireland at several youth levels. In 2023, he was called up to the under-16 team and later represented the under-17 and under-19 sides. In May 2023, he scored his first international goal with the under-16 team, in a match against Ukraine.

In March 2026, Ochoa received his first call-up to the Republic of Ireland under-21 team. He made his debut at that level on 31 March 2026, starting in a 1–0 win against Kazakhstan in UEFA European Under-21 Championship qualification.

== Style of play ==
Ochoa mainly operates as a midfielder and is known for his dribbling ability.

== Career Statistics ==
As of match played on 20 June 2026

Appearances and goals by club, season and competition
| Club | Season | League | | | National Cup (Note: Includes Copa del Rey) | | Other | | Total | |
| Club | Season | Division | Apps | Goals | Apps | Goals | Apps | Goals | Apps | Goals |
|---|---|---|---|---|---|---|---|---|---|---|
| Atlético Malagueño | 2023–24 | Tercera Federación | 14 | 1 | — | | 2 (Note: Appearances in the 2024 Tercera Federación play-offs) | 0 | 16 | 1 |
| Málaga | 2023–24 | Primera Federación | 6 | 0 | 2 | 0 | 1 (Note: Appearance in the 2024 Primera Federación play-offs) | 0 | 9 | 0 |
| Málaga | 2024–25 | Segunda División | 26 | 0 | 1 | 0 | — | | 27 | 0 |
| Málaga | 2025–26 | Segunda División | 24 | 2 | 2 | 1 | 4 (Note: Appearances in the 2026 Segunda División play-offs) | 0 | 30 | 3 |
| Málaga | 2026–27 | La Liga | 0 | 0 | 0 | 0 | — | | 0 | 0 |
| Málaga | Total | | 56 | 2 | 5 | 1 | 5 | 0 | 66 | 3 |
| Career total | | | 70 | 3 | 5 | 1 | 7 | 0 | 82 | 4 |
