= Trofeo Costa del Sol =

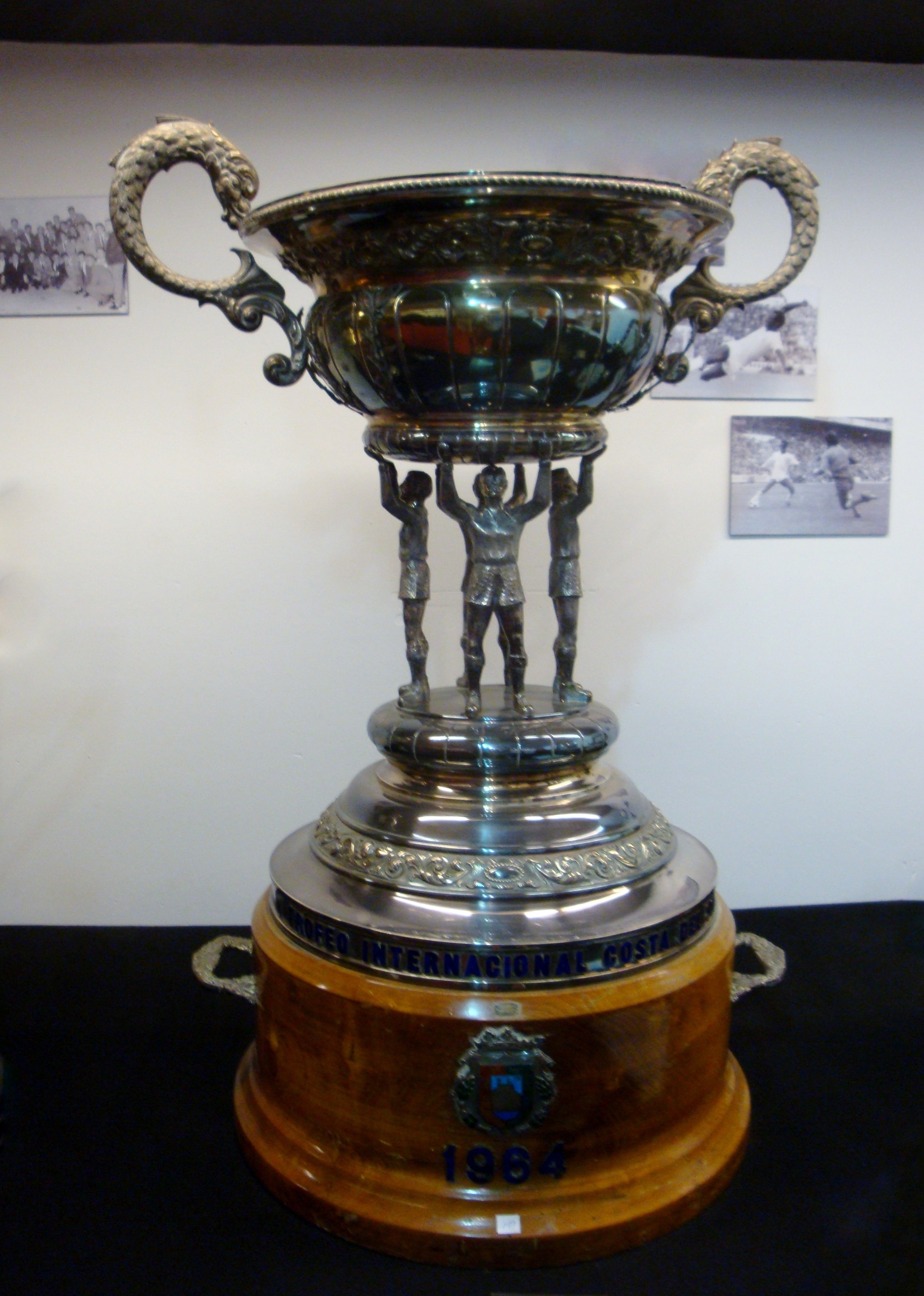
- The cup exhibited in the trophy room of Sevilla FC in 2010
- Organiser(s): Royal Spanish Football Federation; Málaga City Council; Málaga CF
- Founded: 1961; 65 years ago
- Region: Málaga, Spain
- Teams: 4 (1961–83); 2 (2005–present)
- Related competitions: Antonio Puerta Trophy; Trofeo Costa del Sol (basketball)
- Current champions: Málaga CF (2026)
- Most championships: Málaga CF (13 titles)

The Trofeo Costa del Sol (formerly "Trofeo Internacional Costa del Sol") is an annual football competition, organized and financed by the Royal Spanish Football Federation. Held in the city of Málaga, it is also organised by both CD Málaga and the Málaga City Council.

The competition initially ran from 1961 to 1983, being then discontinued due to financial difficulties until 2004, when it was finally relaunched. Since CD Málaga no longer exists as such, Málaga CF now participates in their stead.

== History ==
The competition was held between 1961 and 1984 with four clubs participating, the local team and three invited clubs, with the exception of 1981 and 1982 when it was interrupted due to La Rosaleda Stadium being refurbished for the 1982 FIFA World Cup. Tottenham were invited in 1965 in which they won the trophy and then back in 1966 to defend it which they then won again. Santos FC with superstar Pelé participated in 1967.

Nevertheless, CD Málaga's financial problems resulted in the competition being discontinued in 1983. The Trofeo Costa del Sol was relaunched in 2004, and was then staged until 2018. From the 2005 edition onwards, only one team was invited to play against the host team.

Some of the most notable players to have taken part in the Trofeo Costa del Sol are Pelé (1967), Eusébio (1966), Alfredo Di Stéfano (1963) and Johan Cruyff (1977), playing for their respective clubs. National teams such as the Argentina have participated in the competition as well.

In 2023, Málaga CF announced that the club had intentions to relaunch the tournament, which last edition was held in 2017. The club stated they wanted to bring a German team to the competition.

== Results ==
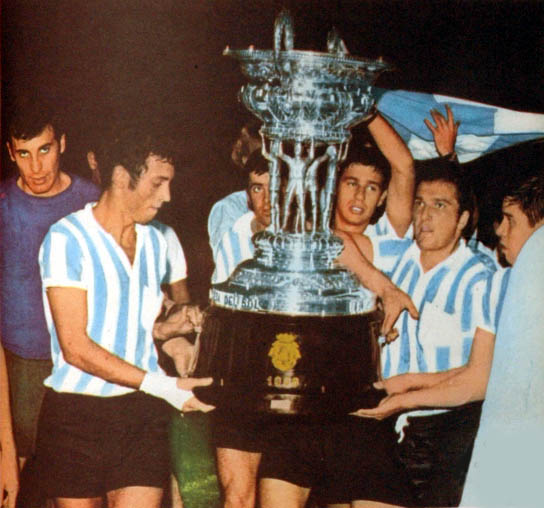
Racing Club players holding the trophy in 1968

Ed.	Year	Champions	Score	Runners-up
1	1961	(Spain) Athletic Bilbao	4–0	(Spain) Sevilla
2	1962	(Italy) Roma	3–0	(Spain) CD Málaga
3	1963	(Spain) CD Málaga	3–1	(Spain) Real Madrid
4	1964	(Spain) Sevilla	2–2 (4-1 p)	(Spain) CD Málaga
5	1965	(England) Tottenham Hotspur	2–1	(Belgium) Standard Liège
6	1966	(England) Tottenham Hotspur	1–0	(Portugal) Benfica
7	1967	(Spain) Espanyol	2–1	Argentina (Note: National team squad)
8	1968	(Argentina) Racing Club	2–0	(Belgium) Anderlecht
9	1969	(Brazil) Corinthians	2–1	(Spain) Barcelona
10	1970	(Hungary) Vasas	3–2	(Spain) CD Málaga
11	1971	(Spain) CD Málaga	2–1	(Socialist Federal Republic of Yugoslavia) Red Star
12	1972	(Uruguay) Nacional	1–0	(Spain) CD Málaga
13	1973	(Socialist Federal Republic of Yugoslavia) Red Star	2–1	(Spain) CD Málaga
14	1974	(Spain) CD Málaga	1–1 (4-3 p)	(England) Derby County
15	1975	(Uruguay) Peñarol	3–2	(Spain) CD Málaga
16	1976	(Spain) Real Madrid	3–0	(Spain) CD Málaga
17	1977	(Spain) Barcelona	3–0	(Spain) CD Málaga
18	1978	(Spain) Athletic Bilbao	2–1	(Argentina) Huracán
19	1979	(Hungary) Ferencváros	2–1	(Spain) Sevilla
20	1980	(Brazil) Atlético Mineiro	1–0	(Spain) CD Málaga
–	1981–1982	(No tournament held)		
21	1983	(Brazil) Internacional	2–0	(Mexico) América
–	1984–2002	(No tournament held)		
–	2003 (Note: Unofficial edition)	(Italy) Brescia	0–0 (3-2 p)	(Spain) Málaga
22	2004	(Spain) Sevilla	1–1 (Note: Triangular trophy whith Parma)	(Spain) Málaga
23	2005	(Spain) Málaga	2–0	(England) Newcastle United
24	2006	(Uruguay) Nacional	1–0	(Spain) Málaga
25	2007 (Note: Played on 16 January 2008)	(Germany) Borussia Dortmund	1–0	(Spain) Málaga
26	2008	(Spain) Málaga	2–1	(Spain) Real Betis
–	2009	(No tournament held)		
27	2010	(Spain) Málaga	2–1	(Italy) Parma
28	2011	(Spain) Málaga	4–0	(Uruguay) Peñarol
29	2012	(Spain) Málaga	1–0	(England) Everton
–	2013	(No tournament held)		
30	2014	(Italy) Fiorentina	2–0	(Spain) Málaga
31	2015	(Spain) Málaga	2–0	(Qatar) Lekhwiya
32	2016	(Spain) Málaga	0–0 (4–2 p)	(Italy) Sampdoria
33	2017	(Italy) Lazio	1–0	(Spain) Málaga
–	2018–2022	(No tournament held)		
34	2023	(Spain) Málaga	2–1	(Spain) Antequera
–	2024	(No tournament held)		
35	2025	(Spain) Málaga	3–1	(Spain) Real Betis
36	2026	(Spain) Málaga	2–2 (Note: After Fulham opted not to take part in the penalty shootout, the trophy was awarded to Málaga)	(England) Fulham
