= Ángel Recio =

Spanish footballer

Personal information
- Full name: Ángel Recio Gutiérrez
- Date of birth: 5 January 2003 (age 23)
- Place of birth: Fuengirola, Spain
- Height: 1.85 m (6 ft 1 in)
- Position: Centre-back

Team information
- Current team: Málaga
- Number: 15

Youth career
- Athletic Fuengirola
- 2015–2017: Málaga
- 2017–2018: San Félix
- 2018–2022: Málaga

Senior career*
Years	Team	Apps	(Gls)
2022–2026	Málaga B	79	(1)
2025–	Málaga	10	(0)

International career
2018	Spain U15		
- * Club domestic league appearances and goals as of 19 August 2026

Ángel Recio Gutiérrez (born 5 January 2003) is a Spanish footballer who plays as a centre-back for Málaga CF.

== Club career ==
Born in Fuengirola, Málaga, Andalusia, Recio joined Málaga CF's youth setup in 2015, from hometown club Athletic Club Fuengirola. On 14 October 2020, while still a youth, he renewed his contract with the former until 2023.

Recio made his senior debut with the reserves on 27 March 2022, coming on as a late substitute for Moussa Diarra in a 1–1 Tercera División RFEF home draw against CD Huétor Vega. He scored his first goal on 29 October of the following year, netting the B's second in a 2–1 away win over Real Jaén.

On 17 June 2025, after being a first-choice and captaining the B-side as they achieved promotion to Segunda Federación, Recio further extended his link with the Boquerones. He made his first team debut on 13 September, starting in a 1–0 Segunda División home loss to SD Huesca.

On 26 February 2026, Recio renewed his contract with Málaga until 2029, being definitely promoted to the main squad ahead of the 2026–27 season. He made his La Liga debut on 19 August, starting in a 2–0 away loss to Atlético Madrid.

== International career ==
In June 2018, Recio was called up to the Spain national under-15 team.
