= 2026 Segunda División play-offs =

Football competition

Segunda División play-offs
- Season: 2025–26
- Promoted: Málaga
- Matches: 6
- Goals: 13 (2.17 per match)

The 2025–26 Segunda División play-offs were played from 6 June to 20 June 2026 and determined the third team promoted to La Liga for the following season. Teams placed between 3rd and 6th position took part in the promotion play-offs.

== Regulations ==
The regulations were the same as the previous seasons: in the semi-finals, the fifth-placed team faced the fourth-placed team, while the sixth-placed team faced the third. Each tie were played over two legs, with the team lower in the table hosting the first leg.

The team that scored more goals on aggregate over the two legs advanced to the next round. If the aggregate score was level, then thirty minutes of extra time would be played. If the aggregate score was still level after extra time, the winner would be the best positioned team in the regular season.

== Road to the play-offs ==
| Pos | Team | Pld | W | D | L | GF | GA | GD | Pts | Qualification or relegation |
|---|---|---|---|---|---|---|---|---|---|---|
| 3 | Almería | 42 | 22 | 8 | 12 | 81 | 63 | +18 | 74 | Qualification for promotion play-offs |
| 4 | Málaga (O, P) | 42 | 21 | 10 | 11 | 75 | 52 | +23 | 73 (Note: Málaga finished ahead of Las Palmas on head-to-head points: Málaga 2–0 Las Palmas, Las Palmas 0–1 Málaga.) | Qualification for promotion play-offs |
| 5 | Las Palmas | 42 | 20 | 13 | 9 | 57 | 40 | +17 | 73 | Qualification for promotion play-offs |
| 6 | Castellón | 42 | 20 | 12 | 10 | 70 | 51 | +19 | 72 (Note: Castellón finished ahead of Burgos on head-to-head points: Castellón 3–1 Burgos, Burgos 0–0 Castellón.) | Qualification for promotion play-offs |

Source: LaLiga Hypermotion
Rules for classification: 1) Points; 2) Head-to-head points; 3) Head-to-head goal difference; 4) Goal difference; 5) Goals scored; 6) Fair-play points
(Note: Head-to-head record is used only after all the matches between the teams in question have been played)
(O) Play-off winners; (P) Promoted

== Bracket ==
Semi-finals
3 | Almería | 1 | 3 | 4
6 | Castellón | 1 | 2 | 3
4 | Málaga | 1 | 1 | 2
5 | Las Palmas | 0 | 1 | 1

Final
3 | Almería | 0 | 1 | 1
4 | Málaga | 0 | 2 | 2

=== Semi-finals ===
| Team 1 | Agg. | Team 2 | 1st leg | 2nd leg |
|---|---|---|---|---|
| Almería | 4−3 | Castellón | 1−1 | 3−2 |
| Málaga | 2–1 | Las Palmas | 1–0 | 1–1 |

First leg

| 6 June 2026 | Castellón | 1−1 | Almería | Castellón de la Plana |
| 21:00 UTC+2 | Brignani 44' | Report | Arribas 66' | Stadium: Estadio SkyFi Castalia; Attendance: 13,991; Referee: Luis Bestard Servera |

| 7 June 2026 | Las Palmas | 0–1 | Málaga | Las Palmas |
| 21:00 UTC+2 | | Report | Larrubia 57' | Stadium: Estadio Gran Canaria; Attendance: 27,128; Referee: Andrés Fuentes Molina |

Second leg

| 9 June 2026 | Almería | 3−2 (4−3 agg.) | Castellón | Almería |
| 21:00 UTC+2 | Embarba 41'; Muñoz 80'; Džodić 90+4' | Report | Calatrava 57'; Sienra 69' | Stadium: UD Almería Stadium; Attendance: 17,007; Referee: Jon Ander González Esteban |

| 10 June 2026 | Málaga | 1–1 (2–1 agg.) | Las Palmas | Málaga |
| 21:00 UTC+2 | Muñoz 69' | Report | Jesé 3' | Stadium: Estadio La Rosaleda; Attendance: 29,935; Referee: Rafael Sánchez López |

=== Final ===
| Team 1 | Agg. | Team 2 | 1st leg | 2nd leg |
|---|---|---|---|---|
| Almería | 1–2 | Málaga | 0–0 | 1–2 |

First leg

| 14 June 2026 | Málaga | 0–0 | Almería | Málaga |
| 21:00 UTC+2 | | Report | | Stadium: Estadio la Rosaleda; Attendance: 30,083; Referee: Salvador Lax Franco |

Second leg

| 20 June 2026 | Almería | 1–2 (1–2 agg.) | Málaga | Almería |
| 21:00 UTC+2 | Baptistão 76' | Report | Chupete 65'; Larrubia 71' | Stadium: UD Almería Stadium; Attendance: 17,825; Referee: Carlos Muñiz Muñoz |
