= Rafita (footballer, born 2004) =

Spanish footballer

Personal information
- Full name: Rafael Garrido Hierro
- Date of birth: 9 November 2004 (age 21)
- Place of birth: Vélez-Málaga, Spain
- Height: 1.70 m (5 ft 7 in)
- Position: Right-back

Team information
- Current team: Málaga
- Number: 31

Youth career
- 2018–2020: Puerto Malagueño
- 2020–2021: Francisco Castejón
- 2021–2022: San Félix
- 2022–2023: Málaga

Senior career*
Years	Team	Apps	(Gls)
2023–2025	Málaga B	73	(5)
2025–	Málaga	29	(0)
- * Club domestic league appearances and goals as of 19 August 2026

Rafael Garrido Hierro (born 9 November 2004), commonly known as Rafita, is a Spanish footballer who plays as a right-back for Málaga CF.

== Career ==
Born in Vélez-Málaga, Málaga, Andalusia, Rafita began his career with CD Puerto Malagueño and played for hometown side EF Francisco Castejón before joining Málaga CF's youth structure in 2021, albeit initially playing for affiliate side CD San Félix. Promoted to Málaga's reserves ahead of the 2023–24 season, he made his senior debut on 10 September 2023, starting in a 0–0 Tercera Federación home draw against UD Almería B.

Rafita scored his first senior goal on 13 October 2024, netting Malagueño's opener in a 5–0 home routing of CF Motril, and finished the campaign as a first-choice as the B-side achieved promotion to Segunda Federación as group champions. He made his first team debut on 5 October 2025, coming on as a late substitute for Jokin Gabilondo in a 3–0 Segunda División away loss to Racing de Santander.

Rafita quickly established himself as a first-choice, and renewed his contract with Málaga until 2029 on 27 November 2025, being definitely promoted to the main squad ahead of the 2026–27 season. He made his La Liga debut on 19 August 2026, starting in a 2–0 away loss to Atlético Madrid.

== Personal life ==
Rafita's father, also named Rafael, was also a footballer. A forward, he notably represented Vélez CF in Segunda División B.
