= Alfonso Herrero =

Spanish footballer

Personal information
- Full name: Alfonso Herrero Peinador
- Date of birth: 21 April 1994 (age 32)
- Place of birth: Toledo, Spain
- Height: 1.83 m (6 ft 0 in)
- Position: Goalkeeper

Team information
- Current team: Málaga
- Number: 1

Youth career
- 2001–2003: Odelot Toletum
- 2003–2013: Real Madrid

Senior career*
Years	Team	Apps	(Gls)
2013–2014	Real Madrid C	33	(0)
2014–2016	Real Madrid B	10	(0)
2016–2017	Oviedo B	31	(0)
2017–2020	Oviedo	46	(0)
2020–2021	Marbella	20	(0)
2021–2022	Burgos	28	(0)
2022–2023	Mirandés	33	(0)
2023–	Málaga	122	(1)

International career
2009	Spain U16	3	(0)
2009–2011	Spain U17	10	(0)
2013	Spain U19	3	(0)
- * Club domestic league appearances and goals as of 19 August 2026

Alfonso Herrero Peinador (born 21 April 1994) is a Spanish footballer who plays as a goalkeeper for Málaga CF.

== Club career ==
Born in Toledo, Castile-La Mancha, Herrero joined Real Madrid's youth setup in 2003, aged nine. He made his senior debut for the C-team on 24 August 2013, starting in a 1–0 Segunda División B away win against Atlético Madrid B.

Herrero was promoted to the reserves in 2014, after the side was relegated to the third division. He made his debut for the side on 24 August of that year, again against Atleti's B-team, but in a 1–2 loss.

Herrero spent his two seasons at the B's as a backup, the first to Rubén Yáñez and the second to Carlos Abad. On 22 July 2016 he signed a three-year contract with Real Oviedo, being initially assigned to the reserve team in Tercera División.

Ahead of the 2017–18 campaign, Herrero was definitely promoted to the first team after Esteban's retirement. He made his professional debut on 6 September 2017, starting in a 0–1 home loss against CD Numancia, for the season's Copa del Rey.

Herrero made his Segunda División debut on 25 November 2017, starting in a 3–1 home win against CD Numancia. He subsequently became the first-choice for Juan Antonio Anquela's side, overtaking Juan Carlos.

On 29 August 2020, free agent Herrero signed for Marbella FC in the third division. The following 5 July, he returned to the second level after agreeing to a contract with Burgos CF.

On 16 July 2022, Herrero signed a one-year deal with CD Mirandés, still in the second tier. A regular starter, he moved to Primera Federación side Málaga CF on 22 June 2023, on a three-year contract.

On 12 May 2024, Herrero scored a goal in the stoppage time against San Fernando CD, and finished the season as a starter as Málaga achieved promotion to division two. He remained a key unit in the following years, and renewed his contract until 2028 on 4 February 2025.

Herrero made his La Liga debut at the age of 32 on 19 August 2026, starting in a 2–0 away loss to Atlético Madrid.

== Career statistics ==
As of match played 31 October 2026

Appearances and goals by club, season and competition
Club	Season	League			National cup		Other		Total	
Club	Season	Division	Apps	Goals	Apps	Goals	Apps	Goals	Apps	Goals
Real Madrid C	2013–14	Segunda División B	33	0	—		—		33	0
Real Madrid B	2014–15	Segunda División B	8	0	—		—		8	0
Real Madrid B	2015–16	Segunda División B	1	0	—		1	0	2	0
Real Madrid B	Total		9	0	—		1	0	10	0
Oviedo B	2016–17	Tercera División	31	0	—		—		31	0
Oviedo	2017–18	Segunda División	27	0	1	0	—		28	0
Oviedo	2018–19	Segunda División	13	0	0	0	—		13	0
Oviedo	2019–20	Segunda División	3	0	1	0	—		4	0
Oviedo	Total		43	0	2	0	—		45	0
Marbella	2020–21	Segunda División B	12	0	0	0	8	0	20	0
Burgos	2021–22	Segunda División	28	0	2	0	—		30	0
Málaga	2022–23	Segunda División	33	0	1	0	—		34	0
Málaga	2023–24	Primera Federación	38	1	0	0	4	0	42	1
Málaga	2024–25	Segunda División	41	0	0	0	—		41	0
Málaga	2025–26	Segunda División	42	0	0	0	4	0	46	0
Málaga	2026–27	La Liga	11	0	0	0	—		11	0
Málaga	Total		132	1	0	0	8	0	140	1
Career total			321	1	5	0	17	0	343	1
