= Adam Aznou =

Footballer (born 2006)

Personal information
- Full name: Adam Aznou Ben Cheikh
- Date of birth: 2 June 2006 (age 20)
- Place of birth: Barcelona, Spain
- Height: 1.78 m (5 ft 10 in)
- Position: Left-back

Team information
- Current team: Málaga (on loan from Everton)
- Number: 39

Youth career
- –2019: Damm
- 2019–2022: Barcelona
- 2022–2024: Bayern Munich

Senior career*
Years	Team	Apps	(Gls)
2024–2025	Bayern Munich II	18	(0)
2024–2025	Bayern Munich	2	(0)
2025	→ Valladolid (loan)	13	(0)
2025–	Everton	0	(0)
2026–	→ Málaga (loan)	3	(0)

International career^{‡}
2021	Morocco U15	2	(0)
2021–2022	Spain U16	7	(0)
2022–2023	Spain U17	4	(0)
2023	Morocco U17	1	(0)
2024–	Morocco U23	2	(0)
2024–	Morocco	3	(0)
- * Club domestic league appearances and goals as of 25 November 2026 ‡ National team caps and goals as of 22:30, 18 November 2024 (UTC)

Adam Aznou Ben Cheikh (Arabic: أدم أزنو بن الشيخ; born 2 June 2006) is a professional footballer who plays as a left-back for LaLiga club Málaga, on loan from Premier League club Everton. Born in Spain, he plays for the Morocco national team.

== Early life ==
Aznou was born in Barcelona, Spain to Moroccan parents.

== Club career ==
=== Early career ===
Aznou started his career with Damm, before moving to Barcelona's La Masia academy in 2019.

=== Bayern Munich ===
On the summer of 2022, having reportedly rejected a number of clubs across Europe, Aznou signed with German side Bayern Munich. In March 2023, he trained with the Bayern Munich senior squad for the first time.

Aznou received his first call-up with the Bayern Munich senior team on 27 January 2024, featuring on the bench as an unused substitute for a Bundesliga 3–2 away win match against FC Augsburg. On 19 February 2024, he made his professional debut for Bayern Munich II on a 1–0 home loss Regionalliga Bayern match against Greuther Fürth II, starting the game. Later that year, on 15 May, he signed his first professional contract with Bayern Munich until 2027. On 2 November 2024, Aznou made his senior debut for Bayern Munich, substituting Alphonso Davies, in a 3–0 Bundesliga home win over Union Berlin. Aznou made his UEFA Champions League debut with Bayern Munich during their sixth league phase game on 10 December 2024, at a 5–1 away win against Shakhtar Donetsk, substituting Konrad Laimer.

On 11 June 2025, Bayern Munich announced their 32-player final squad for the FIFA Club World Cup, which included Aznou.

==== Loan to Valladolid ====
On 3 February 2025, Aznou was loaned to La Liga side Valladolid for the remainder of the 2024–25 season.

=== Everton ===
On 29 July 2025, Aznou signed for Premier League club Everton for a €9 million estimated transfer fee. He made his competitive debut for Everton on 10 January 2026, in an FA Cup match against Sunderland. Shortly after coming on, Aznou won a penalty, which Everton's James Garner scored to equalize and send the game to extra time. Everton would lose 3–0 in the subsequent penalty shootout.

==== Loan to Malaga ====
Aznou made his second competitive appearance for Everton as a substitute in a 4–0 win over Preston North End on 26 August 2026, before joining Málaga on loan for the remainder of the 26–27 season.

== International career ==
Aznou was eligible to represent both Morocco and Spain at international level. He represented Morocco at under-15 level before switching to Spain, with whom he played at under-16 and under-17 level.

In March 2023, he reportedly opted to represent Morocco at senior international level. In August 2024, Aznou received his first call-up with the senior Morocco national team for the 2025 Africa Cup of Nations qualification matches against Gabon and Lesotho, on 6 and 9 September 2024 respectively. He made his debut against the latter at the Adrar Stadium.

== Career statistics ==
=== Club ===
As of match played 26 August 2026

Appearances and goals by club, season and competition
Club	Season	League			National cup (Note: Includes FA Cup)		League cup (Note: Includes EFL Cup)		Europe		Other		Total	
Club	Season	Division	Apps	Goals	Apps	Goals	Apps	Goals	Apps	Goals	Apps	Goals	Apps	Goals
Bayern Munich II	2023–24	Regionalliga Bayern	11	0	—		—		—		—		11	0
Bayern Munich II	2024–25	Regionalliga Bayern	7	0	—		—		—		—		7	0
Bayern Munich II	Total		18	0	—		—		—		—		18	0
Bayern Munich	2023–24	Bundesliga	0	0	0	0	—		0	0	0	0	0	0
Bayern Munich	2024–25	Bundesliga	2	0	0	0	—		1 (Note: Appearance in UEFA Champions League)	0	1 (Note: Appearance in FIFA Club World Cup)	0	4	0
Bayern Munich	Total		2	0	0	0	—		1	0	1	0	4	0
Valladolid (loan)	2024–25	La Liga	13	0	—		—		—		—		13	0
Everton U21	2025–26	—			—		—		—		2 (Note: Appearances in EFL Trophy)	0	2	0
Everton	2025–26	Premier League	0	0	1	0	0	0	—		—		1	0
Everton	2026–27	Premier League	0	0	—		1	0	—		—		1	0
Everton	Total		0	0	1	0	1	0	—		—		2	0
Málaga (loan)	2026–27	La Liga	0	0	0	0	—		—		—		0	0
Career total			33	0	1	0	1	0	1	0	3	0	39	0

=== International ===
As of match played 18 November 2024

Appearances and goals by national team and year
National team	Year	Apps	Goals
Morocco	2024	3	0
Total		3	0

== Honours ==
Bayern Munich

- Bundesliga: 2024–25
