= Eneko Jauregi =

Spanish footballer

Personal information
- Full name: Eneko Jauregi Escobar
- Date of birth: 13 July 1996 (age 30)
- Place of birth: Muxika, Spain
- Height: 1.84 m (6 ft 0 in)
- Position: Forward

Team information
- Current team: Málaga
- Number: 17

Youth career
- Gernika

Senior career*
| Years | Team | Apps | (Gls) |
| 2014–2015 | Berio | 30 | (9) |
| 2015–2018 | Real Sociedad B | 60 | (14) |
| 2018–2019 | Cádiz | 0 | (0) |
| 2018 | → Córdoba (loan) | 11 | (0) |
| 2018–2019 | → Levante B (loan) | 21 | (4) |
| 2019–2020 | Asteras Tripolis | 14 | (1) |
| 2020–2021 | UCAM Murcia | 8 | (1) |
| 2021 | → Lleida Esportiu (loan) | 10 | (0) |
| 2021–2022 | SS Reyes | 26 | (5) |
| 2022–2024 | Amorebieta | 74 | (21) |
| 2024–2025 | Racing Ferrol | 37 | (6) |
| 2025– | Málaga | 24 | (4) |
- * Club domestic league appearances and goals as of 19 August 2026

Eneko Jauregi Escobar (born 13 July 1996) is a Spanish professional footballer who plays as a forward for Málaga CF.

== Club career ==
Born in Muxika, Biscay, Basque Country, Jauregi finished his formation with Gernika Club. On 14 May 2014, he joined Real Sociedad, and was subsequently assigned to the farm team in Tercera División.

Ahead of the 2015–16 season, Jauregi was promoted to the reserves in Segunda División B. On 24 June 2017, he extended his contract for a further year.

On 29 January 2018, Jauregi signed a two-and-a-half-year contract with Segunda División side Cádiz CF. The following day, he moved to fellow league team Córdoba CF on loan until June.

Jauregi made his professional debut on 11 February 2018, coming on as a second-half substitute for Juanjo Narváez in a 1–5 away loss against CD Tenerife. On 23 August, he was loaned to Atlético Levante UD for one year.

After leaving Córdoba, Jauregi joined a host of compatriots at Super League Greece side Asteras Tripolis FC. He returned to his home country on 2 September 2020, after signing for UCAM Murcia CF in the third division.

Jauregi moved to fellow third level side Lleida Esportiu on 1 February 2021, after being sparingly used at UCAM. On 20 August, he agreed to a deal with UD San Sebastián de los Reyes in Primera División RFEF.

Jauregi joined freshly relegated side SD Amorebieta on 24 July 2022, and was the club's top scorer during the campaign with 15 goals as his side returned to division two at first attempt. On 18 July 2024, after suffering relegation, he moved to Racing de Ferrol in the second division.

On 14 July 2025, after another relegation, Jauregi moved to Málaga CF on a one-year contract. The following 9 July, after featuring sparingly as his side achieved promotion to La Liga, he agreed to a one-year extension.

Jauregi made his debut in the main category of Spanish football on 19 August 2026, replacing Dani Lorenzo late into a 2–0 away loss to Atlético Madrid.

== Honours ==
Amorebieta

- Primera Federación: 2022–23 (Group 2 and overall champion)
