= Diego Murillo =

Spanish association football player

Personal information
- Full name: Diego Murillo Domínguez
- Date of birth: 14 March 2001 (age 25)
- Place of birth: Malagón, Spain
- Height: 1.79 m (5 ft 10 in)
- Position: Defender

Team information
- Current team: Málaga
- Number: 16

Youth career
- 2016–2017: FB Ciudad Real
- 2017: Albacete
- 2017–2020: Málaga

Senior career*
Years	Team	Apps	(Gls)
2019–2023	Málaga B	70	(0)
2022–	Málaga	60	(3)
- * Club domestic league appearances and goals as of 3 June 2026

Diego Murillo Domínguez (born 14 March 2001) is a Spanish footballer who plays as either a central defender or a right back for Málaga CF.

== Club career ==
Murillo was born in Malagón, Ciudad Real, Castilla-La Mancha, and joined Málaga CF's youth setup in 2017, after representing EM FB Ciudad Real and Albacete Balompié. He made his senior debut with the reserves on 13 October 2019, starting in a 2–2 Tercera División home draw against Loja CD.

On 7 June 2022, after establishing himself as a regular starter for the B-team, Murillo renewed his contract until 2024 on 7 June 2022. He made his first team debut on 24 September, coming on as a late substitute for Juanfran in a 1–1 Segunda División home draw against Villarreal CF B.

Murillo was promoted to the first team ahead of the 2023–24 season, with the club in Primera Federación, but was mainly a backup option as they returned to second division at first attempt. He scored his first professional goal on 21 April 2025, netting the equalizer in a 2–2 away draw against SD Eibar.

Murillo became a starter for the Blanquiazules in the 2025–26 campaign, scoring twice in 37 matches as they achieved promotion to La Liga; he had previously renewed his contract until 2029 on 13 March 2026.

== Career statistics ==
As of match played 3 June 2026

Appearances and goals by club, season and competition
Club	Season	League			National Cup		Other		Total	
Club	Season	Division	Apps	Goals	Apps	Goals	Apps	Goals	Apps	Goals
Málaga B	2019–20	Tercera División	1	0	—		—		1	0
Málaga B	2020–21	Tercera División	23	0	—		3 (Note: Appearances in promotion playoffs)	0	26	0
Málaga B	2021–22	Tercera División RFEF	26	0	—		1	0	27	0
Málaga B	2022–23	Tercera Federación	20	0	—		4	0	24	0
Málaga B	Total		70	0	—		8	0	78	0
Málaga	2022–23	Segunda División	1	0	0	0	—		1	0
Málaga	2023–24	Primera Federación	13	1	2	0	0	0	16	1
Málaga	2024–25	Segunda División	10	1	1	0	—		11	1
Málaga	2025–26	Segunda División	36	2	1	0	4	0	41	2
Málaga	Total		60	4	4	0	4	0	68	4
Career total			130	4	4	0	12	0	146	4
