= Rafa (footballer, born 2003) =

Spanish football player

Personal information
- Full name: Rafael Rodríguez Ruiz
- Date of birth: 10 July 2003 (age 23)
- Place of birth: Seville, Spain
- Height: 1.80 m (5 ft 11 in)
- Position: Central midfielder

Team information
- Current team: Málaga
- Number: 14

Youth career
- 2010–2017: Betis
- 2017–2022: Málaga

Senior career*
Years	Team	Apps	(Gls)
2021–2025	Málaga B	82	(11)
2023–	Málaga	46	(7)
- * Club domestic league appearances and goals as of 19 August 2026

Rafael Rodríguez Ruiz (born 10 July 2003), commonly known as Rafa, is a Spanish footballer who plays as a central midfielder for Málaga CF.

== Club career ==
Born in Seville, Andalusia, Rafa joined Málaga CF's youth setup in 2017, from Real Betis. He made his senior debut with the reserves on 12 September 2021, starting in a 2–1 Tercera División RFEF away loss against Motril CF.

Rafa scored his first senior goal on 25 September 2022, netting the B's equalizer from the midfield in a 3–2 away win over UD Ciudad de Torredonjimeno. He made his first team debut the following 27 May, coming on as a late substitute for fellow youth graduate Álex Calvo in a 1–1 home draw against UD Ibiza in the Segunda División, as both sides were already relegated.

Rafa scored his first professional goal on 21 April 2025, netting his side's second in a 2–2 draw at SD Eibar. On 2 June, he renewed his contract until 2028 and was definitely promoted to the main squad.

Rafa was regularly used during the 2025–26 campaign, contributing with five goals in 44 appearances overall as Málaga achieved promotion to La Liga. He made his debut in the category on 19 August 2026, replacing Carlos Dotor in a 2–0 away loss to Atlético Madrid.
