= Antonio Benítez (footballer, born 1942) =

Spanish footballer and manager (1942–2022)

Antonio Fernández
Personal information
- Full name: Antonio Fernández Benítez
- Date of birth: 5 April 1942
- Place of birth: Alicante, Spain
- Date of death: 22 January 2022 (aged 79)
- Height: 1.69 m (5 ft 7 in)
- Position: Midfielder

Youth career
- 1960–1964: Atlético Malagueño

Senior career*
Years	Team	Apps	(Gls)
1964–1976	Málaga	189	(2)

Managerial career
- 1981–1985: Málaga
- 1986–1987: Málaga
- 1987: Real Murcia
- 1989–1990: Málaga
- 1994–1996: Málaga CF
- * Club domestic league appearances and goals

Antonio Fernández Benítez (5 April 1942 – 22 January 2022) was a Spanish professional football player and manager.

== Career ==
Fernández played for Atlético Malagueño and Málaga as a midfielder.

He later managed Málaga, Real Murcia, and Málaga CF. He also held other roles with Málaga CF, including in an advisory role.

== Personal life ==
Fernández was born in Alicante on 5 April 1942. He died on 22 January 2022, at the age of 79.
