= Haitam Abaida =

Moroccan footballer (born 2002)

Haitam
Personal information
- Full name: Haitam Abaida El Achhab
- Date of birth: 1 June 2002 (age 24)
- Place of birth: Polinyà, Spain
- Height: 1.72 m (5 ft 8 in)
- Position: Winger

Team information
- Current team: Málaga
- Number: 7

Youth career
- Calella
- 2012–2017: Barcelona
- 2017–2022: Málaga

Senior career*
| Years | Team | Apps | (Gls) |
| 2021–2022 | Málaga B | 30 | (6) |
| 2021– | Málaga | 27 | (4) |

International career
| 2018 | Morocco U17 | 5 | (0) |
- * Club domestic league appearances and goals as of 30 August 2026

Haitam Abaida El Achhab (born 1 June 2002) is a footballer who plays for Spanish club Málaga CF. Mainly a left winger, he can also play as a right back. Born in Spain, he represented Morocco at youth international level.

== Club career ==
Born in Polinyà, Barcelona, Catalonia to Moroccan parents, Abaida joined FC Barcelona's La Masia in 2012, from Fundació Calella. In August 2017, after being out of action due to a FIFA ban on Barça, he joined Málaga CF.

On 6 January 2021, before even having appeared for the reserves, Abaida made his first team debut by coming on as a late substitute for fellow youth graduate David Larrubia in a 1–0 home win against Real Oviedo, for the season's Copa del Rey. His Segunda División debut occurred on 2 May, as he replaced Ismael Casas late into a 3–0 away loss against RCD Espanyol.

Abaida scored his first professional goal on 19 November 2022, netting the opener in a 1–1 draw at Real Zaragoza. Definitely promoted to the main squad ahead of the 2023–24 season, in Primera Federación, he renewed his contract until 2027 on 13 December, but had limited playing time afterwards after struggling severely with injuries.

Abaida scored once in 11 matches overall during the 2025–26 campaign, as the club achieved promotion to La Liga. He made his top tier debut on 24 August 2026, replacing Joaquín Muñoz in a 1–1 home draw against Deportivo de A Coruña.
