= Jokin Gabilondo =

Spanish association football player

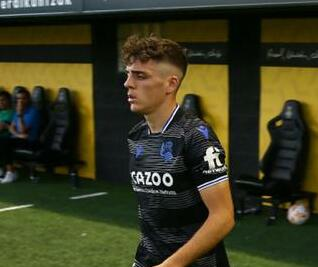
- Gabilondo in 2022

Personal information
- Full name: Jokin Gabilondo Garmendia
- Date of birth: 9 April 1999 (age 27)
- Place of birth: Urretxu, Spain
- Height: 1.76 m (5 ft 9 in)
- Position: Right-back

Team information
- Current team: Zaragoza
- Number: 2

Youth career
- Real Sociedad

Senior career*
Years	Team	Apps	(Gls)
2018–2022	Real Sociedad C	52	(4)
2019–2023	Real Sociedad B	57	(4)
2020–2021	→ Arenas Getxo (loan)	24	(0)
2023–2026	Málaga	67	(1)
2026–	Zaragoza	0	(0)
- * Club domestic league appearances and goals as of 3 June 2026

Jokin Gabilondo Garmendia (born 9 April 1999) is a Spanish professional footballer who plays as a right-back for Real Zaragoza.

== Club career ==
Born in Urretxu, Gipuzkoa, Basque Country, Gabilondo was a Real Sociedad youth graduate. He made his senior debut with the C-team on 25 August 2018, starting in a 2–0 Tercera División away win over SD San Pedro.

Gabilondo scored his first senior goal on 28 April 2019, netting the C's first in a 2–2 home draw against CD Basconia. He first appeared with the reserves on 9 November, starting in a 3–1 home success over Salamanca CF UDS in the Segunda División B.

On 6 October 2020, Gabilondo moved to fellow third division side Arenas Club de Getxo on loan for one year. Upon returning the following June, he was assigned back at the C-side.

Gabilondo made his professional debut with the B-team on 24 September 2021, replacing Roberto López late into a 0–2 Segunda División home loss against SD Huesca. He was definitely promoted to the B's ahead of the 2022–23 season, with the side now in Primera Federación.

On 26 June 2023, Gabilondo signed a two-year contract with Málaga CF, freshly relegated to the third level. He helped the club achieve two promotions during his three-season spell, but was mainly a backup option in 2025–26.

On 3 July 2026, Gabilondo agreed to a two-year deal with Real Zaragoza also in division three.
