= Adrián Niño =

Spanish footballer (born 2004)

Personal information
- Full name: Adrián Niño Heredia
- Date of birth: 19 June 2004 (age 22)
- Place of birth: Rota, Spain
- Height: 1.85 m (6 ft 1 in)
- Position: Forward

Team information
- Current team: Málaga
- Number: 21

Youth career
- Roteña
- 2014–2016: Cádiz
- 2016–2019: Roteña
- 2019–2020: Atlético Sanluqueño
- 2020–2023: Atlético Madrid

Senior career*
Years	Team	Apps	(Gls)
2023–2025	Atlético Madrid B	69	(19)
2025	Atlético Madrid	1	(0)
2025–	Málaga	30	(12)

International career^{‡}
2021	Spain U18	2	(0)
2023	Spain U19	1	(0)
2022	Spain U20	2	(2)
2025–	Spain U21	3	(2)
- * Club domestic league appearances and goals as of 3 June 2026 ‡ National team caps and goals as of 31 March 2026

Adrián Niño Heredia (born 19 June 2004) is a Spanish professional footballer who currently plays as a forward for Málaga CF.

== Club career ==
=== Atlético Madrid ===
Born in Rota, Andalusia, Niño began his career with local side UD Roteña, before spending two seasons with professional side Cádiz. He returned to Roteña before joining Atlético Sanluqueño in 2019, where he was scouted and signed the following year by La Liga side Atlético Madrid.

He progressed through the academy, forming a prolific partnership with teammate Abde Raihani, with the two scoring 57 goals between them in the 2022–23 season. He featured in the 2022–23 UEFA Youth League for Atlético Madrid, becoming the first player in history to score in every single group stage game, scoring seven in six games. In February 2023, he signed a four-year contract renewal with the club. The same month, he trained with the Atlético Madrid first team for the first time.

=== Málaga ===
On 15 July 2025, Niño signed a four-year contract with Segunda División side Málaga CF.

== International career ==
Niño is a Spain youth international, having previously represented the country at various youth levels.

He received his first call-up to the Spain U21 for the 2027 UEFA European Under-21 Championship qualification matches against Cyprus and Kosovo. He remained an unused substitute in the first match against Cyprus, before making his debut against Kosovo, coming on in the 89th minute and scoring his first goal six minutes later.

== Honours ==
Individual

- La Liga U23 Player of the Month: October 2026
