= Dani Lorenzo =

Spanish association football player

Personal information
- Full name: Daniel Lorenzo Guerrero
- Date of birth: 5 April 2003 (age 23)
- Place of birth: Marbella, Spain
- Height: 1.76 m (5 ft 9 in)
- Position: Attacking midfielder

Team information
- Current team: Málaga
- Number: 22

Youth career
- 2013–2017: Málaga
- 2017–2021: Real Madrid

Senior career*
Years	Team	Apps	(Gls)
2021–2022	Málaga B	24	(1)
2021–	Málaga	95	(10)
2023	→ Mérida (loan)	17	(2)
- * Club domestic league appearances and goals as of 19 August 2026

Daniel "Dani" Lorenzo Guerrero (born 5 April 2003) is a Spanish footballer who plays as an attacking midfielder for Málaga CF.

== Club career ==
Born in Marbella, Málaga, Andalusia, Lorenzo joined Real Madrid's La Fábrica in 2017 from Málaga CF. On 20 July 2021, he returned to Málaga and was assigned to the reserves in the Tercera División RFEF.

Lorenzo made his senior debut on 19 September 2021, starting with the B's in a 1–1 home draw against UD Torre del Mar. He scored his first goal on 12 October, netting the opener in home draw against CD Alhaurino, for the same scoreline.

Lorenzo made his first-team debut on 2 December 2021, coming on as a second-half substitute for fellow youth graduate Haitam Abaida in a 3–0 away win over Peña Sport FC in the season's Copa del Rey. He made his professional debut three days later, replacing Mathieu Peybernes in a 1–2 home loss against SD Amorebieta in the Segunda División.

On 19 January 2023, Lorenzo renewed his contract until 2025, and was loaned to Primera Federación side Mérida AD for the remainder of the season. Upon returning, he became a regular starter for the side – now also in the third division – and scored four goals in 42 appearances overall during the 2023–24 campaign, as the club achieved promotion to the second level.

Lorenzo scored his first professional goal on 27 November 2024, but in a 4–2 loss at Levante UD, but had limited playing time afterwards due to injuries. Back to full fitness, he established himself as a first-choice before renewing his link until 2028 on 4 March 2026.

Lorenzo made his La Liga debut on 19 August 2026, starting in a 2–0 away loss to Atlético Madrid.
