= Carlos Puga =

Spanish association football player

Personal information
- Full name: Carlos Francisco Puga Medina
- Date of birth: 26 November 2000 (age 25)
- Place of birth: Albuñol, Spain
- Height: 1.75 m (5 ft 9 in)
- Position: Right-back

Team information
- Current team: Málaga
- Number: 3

Youth career
- Albuñol
- 2008–2011: La Mojonera
- 2011–2015: Granada
- 2015–2017: Almería
- 2017–2018: La Mojonera
- 2018–2019: Santa Fe

Senior career*
Years	Team	Apps	(Gls)
2019–2020	Motril	27	(3)
2020–2021	Córdoba B	22	(0)
2021–2023	Córdoba	60	(0)
2023–2024	Atlético Madrid B	13	(0)
2024–	Málaga	69	(0)
- * Club domestic league appearances and goals as of 19 August 2026

Carlos Francisco Puga Medina (born 26 November 2000) is a Spanish professional footballer who plays for Málaga CF. Mainly a right-back, he can also play as a right winger.

== Career ==
Born in Albuñol, Granada, Andalusia, Puga represented AD Albuñol and La Mojonera CF before joining Granada CF's youth setup in 2011. He moved to UD Almería in 2015 before returning to La Mojonera in 2017, and finished his formation with CD Santa Fe.

In 2019, Puga signed for Tercera División side CF Motril. He made his senior debut on 25 August, in a 2–0 away win over Loja CD, and scored his first goal on 8 September, netting his team's third in a 3–1 win at Melilla CD.

On 5 October 2020, Puga moved to Córdoba CF and was initially assigned to the reserves also in the fourth division. The following 1 July, after already making his first team debut in Segunda División B, he renewed his contract until 2023 and was definitely assigned to the main squad now in Segunda División RFEF.

On 1 August 2023, Puga agreed to a two-year deal with another reserve team, Atlético Madrid B in Primera Federación. He terminated his link with the Colchoneros on 1 February of the following year, and signed for fellow league team Málaga CF just hours later.

On 4 July 2024, after helping the Blanquiazules in their promotion to Segunda División, Puga renewed his contract until 2026. He made his professional debut on 24 August, starting in a 1–1 home draw against CD Mirandés.

Puga subsequently established himself as a first-choice, and further extended his link until 2029 on 23 January 2026. He made his La Liga debut on 19 August, starting in a 2–0 away loss to former side Atlético Madrid.
