= Juan Francisco Funes =

Spanish football manager (born 1983)

Personal information
- Full name: Juan Francisco Funes Arjona
- Date of birth: 25 June 1983 (age 43)
- Place of birth: Loja, Spain
- Position: Left-back

Team information
- Current team: Málaga (manager)

Youth career
- Imperio Albolote

Senior career*
Years	Team	Apps	(Gls)
2002–2003	Loja		
2003–2004	Villanueva Mesía		
2004–2005	Atlético Monachil	11	(0)
2005–2006	Loja		
2006–2009	Huétor Tájar	78	(1)

Managerial career
- 2009–2013: Loja (assistant)
- 2013–2014: Loja
- 2014: Guijuelo (assistant)
- 2015: Vélez
- 2015–2017: Loja
- 2017–2020: El Palo
- 2020–2025: Málaga B
- 2025–: Málaga
- * Club domestic league appearances and goals

Juan Francisco Funes Arjona (born 25 June 1983) is a Spanish retired footballer who played as a left-back, and the manager of Málaga CF.

== Playing career ==
Born in Loja, Granada, Andalusia, Funes was a CD Imperio de Albolote youth graduate, before making his senior debut with hometown side Loja CD in the 2002–03 season, in Tercera División.

In January 2005, after playing for lowly CF Villanueva Mesía and CA Monachil, Funes returned to Loja. He later moved to CD Huétor Tájar in the following year, and retired in 2009, aged 26.

== Managerial career ==
In July 2009, Funes was invited to join Fernando Estévez's staff at his former club Loja, as his assistant. In June 2013, he was appointed manager of the side after Estévez left.

Funes departed Loja on 4 June 2014, and rejoined Estévez's staff at CD Guijuelo on 11 July. In December, however, he left the latter due to personal reasons, and returned to managerial duties with Vélez CF on 28 January 2015.

Funes left Vélez by mutual consent on 3 March 2015, and returned to Loja on 6 July. He again left the club in June 2017, and was named at the helm of CD El Palo on 20 October of that year.

On 30 June 2020, Funes was appointed manager of Málaga CF's reserves in the fourth division. He agreed to contract extensions over the following years, and led the club to a promotion to Segunda Federación in the 2024–25 campaign after leading their group.

On 19 November 2025, Funes replaced Sergio Pellicer at the helm of the first team of Málaga in Segunda División. On his professional debut four days later, he led the side to a 3–2 home win over CD Mirandés.

Funes led the club to a nine-match unbeaten run in the league, which included six straight wins, which left the club in the promotion play-off places. Despite suffering two losses in the following three matches, he remained unbeaten in the following six rounds, renewing his contract until 2028 on 29 March 2026; his side also ended the season with a promotion to La Liga in the play-offs.

== Managerial statistics ==
As of 22 November 2026

Managerial record by team and tenure
Team	Nat	From	To	Record								Ref
Team	Nat	From	To	G	W	D	L	GF	GA	GD	Win %	Ref
Loja	(Spain)	3 June 2013	4 June 2014	40	24	9	7	89	45	+44	60.00	
Vélez	(Spain)	28 January 2015	3 March 2015	5	1	0	4	2	7	−5	20.00	
Loja	(Spain)	6 July 2015	30 June 2017	78	45	15	18	133	71	+62	57.69	
El Palo	(Spain)	20 October 2017	26 June 2020	106	53	25	28	163	113	+50	50.00	
Atlético Malagueño	(Spain)	30 June 2020	19 November 2025	175	89	43	43	286	160	+126	50.86	
Málaga	(Spain)	19 November 2025	Present	47	20	14	13	76	63	+13	42.55	
Career total				451	232	106	113	749	459	+290	51.44	—
