= Sergio Pellicer =

Spanish footballer (born 1973)

Personal information
- Full name: Sergio Pellicer García
- Date of birth: 9 September 1973 (age 53)
- Place of birth: Nules, Spain
- Height: 1.79 m (5 ft 10 in)
- Position: Right back

Youth career
- Valencia

Senior career*
| Years | Team | Apps | (Gls) |
| 1993–1996 | Valencia B | 58 | (6) |
| 1995 | → Hércules (loan) | 5 | (0) |
| 1996–1997 | Málaga | 47 | (0) |
| 1997–1999 | Cádiz | 31 | (0) |
| 1999–2000 | Jaén | 34 | (0) |
| 2000–2001 | Gramenet | 22 | (0) |
| 2001–2003 | Hércules | 36 | (0) |
| 2003–2004 | Onda | | |
| 2004–2005 | Alcalá | 34 | (3) |
| 2005–2008 | Villajoyosa | 91 | (2) |
| 2008–2009 | Eldense | 0 | (0) |
| Total | | 358 | (11) |

International career
| 1993 | Spain U20 | 3 | (0) |

Managerial career
- 2009: Campello
- 2009–2010: Alicante (assistant)
- 2010–2011: Logroñés (assistant)
- 2010: Logroñés (caretaker)
- 2011–2013: Valencia (youth)
- 2014: Elche (youth)
- 2014–2015: San Félix (youth)
- 2015–2016: Málaga (youth)
- 2016–2017: Málaga (assistant)
- 2018–2019: Deportivo B
- 2019–2020: Málaga B
- 2020–2021: Málaga
- 2021–2022: Fuenlabrada
- 2023–2025: Málaga
- * Club domestic league appearances and goals

Sergio Pellicer García (born 9 September 1973) is a Spanish former footballer who played as a right back, and is a current manager.

== Playing career ==
Born in Nules, Province of Castellón, most of Pellicer's playing career was spent in Segunda División B, where he made 353 appearances across 16 seasons. His sole professional output was five Segunda División games on loan at Hércules CF in 1995, in his native Valencian Community.

== Coaching career ==
Pellicer worked as a youth or assistant coach at several teams upon retiring. On 29 December 2016 he was appointed as assistant to Marcelo Romero at La Liga club Málaga CF, where he had previously played.

On 23 October 2018, Pellicer was confirmed as manager of Deportivo Fabril, the reserve team of Deportivo de La Coruña who were second from bottom in their third-tier group. He left the following 4 February, with them now dead last and 13 points from safety.

Pellicer returned to Málaga on 1 July 2019, taking over their second team in the Tercera División. Six months later, he was thrust into the first team following the ousting of Víctor Sánchez. On his professional managerial debut on 14 January, his team won 1–0 at home to SD Ponferradina with a second-minute goal by Antoñín.

On 18 May 2021, Pellicer announced his departure from Málaga at the end of the campaign, after keeping the club two consecutive seasons in the second level despite their economic problems. On 15 December, he replaced sacked José Luis Oltra at the helm of fellow second-tier side CF Fuenlabrada, but was himself dismissed on 6 March 2022.

After ten months without a club, Pellicer returned to Málaga on 25 January 2023, signing a contract until 2024; he replaced the sacked Pepe Mel. He led the club back to the second division in his second season, and renewed his link until 2026 on 28 June 2024.

On 18 November 2025, after only five wins in 15 matches during the 2025–26 campaign, Pellicer was sacked.

== Managerial statistics ==
As of 23 November 2025

Managerial record by team and tenure
| Team | Nat | From | To | Record | | | | | | | | Ref |
| Team | Nat | From | To | G | W | D | L | GF | GA | GD | Win % | Ref |
|---|---|---|---|---|---|---|---|---|---|---|---|---|
| Logroñés (caretaker) | (Spain) | 25 October 2010 | 3 November 2010 | 2 | 0 | 0 | 2 | 0 | 4 | −4 | 0.00 | |
| Deportivo B | (Spain) | 23 October 2018 | 4 February 2019 | 14 | 2 | 4 | 8 | 11 | 23 | −12 | 14.29 | |
| Málaga B | (Spain) | 3 July 2019 | 11 January 2020 | 19 | 8 | 4 | 7 | 30 | 23 | +7 | 42.11 | |
| Málaga | (Spain) | 11 January 2020 | 31 May 2021 | 65 | 23 | 20 | 22 | 60 | 62 | −2 | 35.38 | |
| Fuenlabrada | (Spain) | 15 December 2021 | 6 March 2022 | 11 | 1 | 4 | 6 | 9 | 17 | −8 | 9.09 | |
| Málaga | (Spain) | 25 January 2023 | 18 November 2025 | 122 | 46 | 41 | 35 | 144 | 117 | +27 | 37.70 | |
| Total | | | | 233 | 80 | 73 | 80 | 254 | 246 | +8 | 34.33 | — |
