= Álex Pastor =

Spanish footballer

Personal information
- Full name: Álex Pastor Carayol
- Date of birth: 1 October 1999 (age 27)
- Place of birth: Barcelona, Spain
- Height: 1.85 m (6 ft 1 in)
- Position: Centre-back

Team information
- Current team: Málaga
- Number: 5

Youth career
- –2014: Santboià
- 2014–2015: Espanyol
- 2015–2020: Sampdoria

Senior career*
Years	Team	Apps	(Gls)
2018–2020	Sampdoria	0	(0)
2018–2019	→ Vis Pesaro (loan)	26	(0)
2020–2024	Andorra	91	(4)
2024–	Málaga	33	(1)
- * Club domestic league appearances and goals as of 28 November 2025

Álex Pastor Carayol (born 1 October 1999) is a Spanish professional footballer who plays as a centre-back for Málaga CF.

== Club career ==
Born in Barcelona, Catalonia, Pastor moved to UC Sampdoria in 2015, from RCD Espanyol. In 2018, he was loaned to Serie C side Vis Pesaro dal 1898, making his senior debut on 18 September in a match against US Triestina Calcio 1918. He returned to Samp in 2019, but featured rarely for their Primavera squad.

On 11 September 2020, Pastor signed for Segunda División B side FC Andorra. On 8 June 2022, after helping the club to achieve a first-ever promotion to Segunda División, he renewed his contract until 2024.

On 11 July 2024, free agent Pastor signed a two-year deal with Málaga CF also in the second division. In August 2025, he suffered a knee injury which sidelined him for the entire 2025–26 season, but still renewed his contract until 2028 on 7 January 2026.
