= Chupete =

Spanish footballer (born 2004)

Personal information
- Full name: Carlos Ruiz Rubio
- Date of birth: 24 August 2004 (age 22)
- Place of birth: Córdoba, Spain
- Height: 1.85 m (6 ft 1 in)
- Position: Forward

Team information
- Current team: Málaga
- Number: 9

Youth career
- La Ribera
- Séneca
- 2018–2019: Altair
- 2019–2020: Sevilla
- 2020–2021: Séneca
- 2021–2022: San Félix

Senior career*
Years	Team	Apps	(Gls)
2022–2025	Málaga B	82	(46)
2024–	Málaga	59	(28)
- * Club domestic league appearances and goals as of 19 August 2026

Carlos Ruiz Rubio (born 24 August 2004), commonly known as Chupete or Chupe, is a Spanish professional footballer who plays as a forward for Málaga CF.

== Career ==
Born in Córdoba, Andalusia, Chupete began his career with CD La Ribera del Guadalquivir, and subsequently played for Séneca CF before joining Sevilla FC, where he also featured with affiliate club CD Altair. In June 2021, after a one-year spell back at Séneca, he joined Málaga CF, where he was the top scorer of affiliate side CD San Félix.

Promoted to the reserves in Tercera Federación ahead of the 2022–23 season, Chupete made his senior debut on 11 September 2022, starting in a 2–1 away loss to Atlético Porcuna CF. He scored his first senior goal on 2 October, netting his side's fourth in a 4–0 home routing of CD Torreperogil. On 17 April 2024, he renewed his contract until 2025.

Chupete began the 2024–25 campaign scoring a hat-trick for the B's in a 5–1 away routing of CP Almería on 8 September 2024, and repeated the feat seven days later in a 3–2 home win over Arenas CD. He made his first team debut on 20 September, coming on as a late substitute for Luismi in a 2–2 Segunda División away draw against Granada CF.

Chupete scored his first professional goal on 11 January 2025, netting the equalizer in a 1–1 home draw against Deportivo de La Coruña. Late in the month, he renewed his contract until 2028, being definitely promoted to the main squad for the 2025–26 season.

Chupete quickly became a starter for the Blanquiazules, and renewed his contract until 2029 on 20 May 2026. He ended the year with 25 goals and also provided six assists in 45 matches, being a key unit in the club's promotion to La Liga.

Chupete made his debut in the main category of Spanish football on 19 August 2026, starting in a 2–0 away loss to Atlético Madrid.
