= Carlos Dotor =

Spanish footballer

Personal information
- Full name: Carlos Dotor González
- Date of birth: 15 March 2001 (age 25)
- Place of birth: Madrid, Spain
- Height: 1.80 m (5 ft 11 in)
- Position: Midfielder

Team information
- Current team: Málaga (on loan from Celta)
- Number: 8

Youth career
- 2008–2015: Rayo Majadahonda
- 2015–2021: Real Madrid

Senior career*
Years	Team	Apps	(Gls)
2019–2023	Real Madrid B	89	(26)
2023–	Celta	17	(0)
2024–2025	→ Oviedo (loan)	6	(0)
2025	→ Sporting Gijón (loan)	13	(2)
2025–	→ Málaga (loan)	35	(1)
- * Club domestic league appearances and goals as of 3 June 2026

Carlos Dotor González (born 15 March 2001) is a Spanish professional footballer who plays as a midfielder for Málaga CF on loan from RC Celta de Vigo.

== Career ==
=== Real Madrid ===
Dotor started his career with the academy of Spanish side Rayo Majadahonda before joining La Fábrica at Real Madrid in 2015.

=== Celta ===
On 20 July 2023, La Liga side RC Celta de Vigo announced the signing of Dotor on a five-year contract. He made his professional – and top tier – debut on 19 August, playing the last six minutes of a 1–1 away draw against Real Sociedad.

==== Loans in Segunda División ====
On 21 July 2024, Dotor was loaned to Real Oviedo in Segunda División for the season. On 25 January 2025, he moved on a new loan to Sporting de Gijón, also in the second division.

On 8 July 2025, Dotor joined Málaga CF also in the second division, also on a one-year loan deal. On 21 July of the following year, after helping the side to achieve promotion to the top tier, his loan was extended for a further season.

== Career statistics ==
As of match played 28 January 2024

Appearances and goals by club, season and competition
Club	Season	League			Copa del Rey		Other		Total	
Club	Season	Division	Apps	Goals	Apps	Goals	Apps	Goals	Apps	Goals
Real Madrid Castilla	2019–20	Segunda División B	1	0	—		—		1	0
Real Madrid Castilla	2020–21	Segunda División B	23	4	—		1 (Note: Appearance in 2021 Segunda División B play-offs)	0	24	4
Real Madrid Castilla	2021–22	Primera División RFEF	35	10	—		—		35	10
Real Madrid Castilla	2022–23	Primera Federación	25	9	—		4 (Note: Appearances in 2023 Primera Federación play-offs)	3	29	12
Real Madrid Castilla	Total		84	23	0	0	5	3	89	26
Celta de Vigo	2023–24	La Liga	16	0	2	0	—		18	0
Career total			100	23	2	0	5	3	107	26

== Honours ==
Real Madrid Juvenil A

- UEFA Youth League: 2019–20
