= Málaga CF =

Association football club in Spain

Málaga
- Full name: Málaga Club de Fútbol, S.A.D.
- Nicknames: Los Albicelestes (The White-and-Sky-Blues); Los Blanquiazules (The White-and-Blues); Los Boquerones (The Anchovies)
- Founded: 25 May 1948; 78 years ago as Club Atlético Malagueño
- Stadium: La Rosaleda
- Capacity: 30,044
- Owner: Sheikh Abdullah Al Thani
- President: José María Muñoz (Administrador Judicial)
- Head coach: Juan Francisco Funes
- League: La Liga
- 2025–26: Segunda División, 4th of 22 (promoted via play-offs)
- Website: malagacf.com
Home colours	Away colours	Third colours

Málaga Club de Fútbol (Spanish pronunciation: [ˈmalaɣa ˈkluβ ðe ˈfuðβol], Málaga Football Club), or simply Málaga, is a football club based in Málaga, Andalusia, Spain, that competes in La Liga, the top tier of the Spanish league system, following their promotion from the Segunda División in the 2025–26 season.

They won the UEFA Intertoto Cup in 2002 and qualified for the following season's UEFA Cup, reaching the quarter-final stages. They also qualified for the 2012–13 UEFA Champions League, where they were quarter-finalists. Since June 2010, the owner of the club has been Qatari investor Abdullah bin Nasser Al Thani, who since July 2026 has been wanted under an international arrest warrant for charges including misappropriation of club funds. Jose Maria Muñoz became the court-appointed administrator of the club in 2020.

== History ==
=== Club Atlético Malagueño ===
Málaga's history traces back to CD Málaga, a club founded in 1904. Club Atlético Malagueño was founded on 25 May 1948 as a former reserve team of CD Málaga, after the club absorbed CD Santo Tomás with the purpose of establishing a reserve team, it took over as Málaga's main team.

Club Atlético Malagueño and CD Málaga had found themselves together in the 1959–60 Tercera División after CD Málaga was relegated at the end of the 1958–59 Segunda División. As a reserve team, the former should have been relegated to regional competition. To avoid this, they separated from their parent club and registered as an independent club within the Royal Spanish Football Federation. That move made it possible for CA Malagueño to survive after CD Málaga suspended operations.

The 1992–93 season saw CA Malagueño playing in Tercera División Group 9. After a successful campaign, the club was promoted to the Segunda División B. The following season, however, the club was relegated again and, were in danger of folding due to financial struggles.

=== Name change to Málaga CF ===
On 19 December 1993, in a referendum, the club's members voted in favour of changing names and, on 29 June 1994, CA Malagueño changed their name to Málaga Club de Fútbol S.A.D.

In the early 2000s, Málaga had a roster of talented young players and a modern stadium. Although they never pushed for a Champions League place, under manager Joaquín Peiro the club won trophies and was promoted to a higher division.

They made a solitary appearance in the UEFA Intertoto Cup in 2002, clinching their only official trophy by beating Gent, Willem II and Villarreal. Málaga's run in the UEFA Cup was something of an overachievement, and ended in a defeat on penalties in the quarter-finals to Boavista, after beating Željezničar Sarajevo (who had been eliminated from the Champions League by Newcastle United), Amica Wronki, Leeds United (after a 2–1 win at Elland Road, courtesy of two Julio Dely Valdés goals) and AEK Athens.

After Peiró's retirement, a mass exodus slowly started. Darío Silva, Kiki Musampa, Dely Valdés and Pedro Contreras all left the club. Juande Ramos took over as coach and oversaw a 5–1 home thrashing of Barcelona, the club's biggest victory against the Catalan giants, with a hat-trick from loanee Salva Ballesta, who would end up missing out on the Pichichi Trophy by just two goals. Ramos, however, left for the Sevilla and Gregorio Manzano took charge.

=== Slow decline and financial issues ===
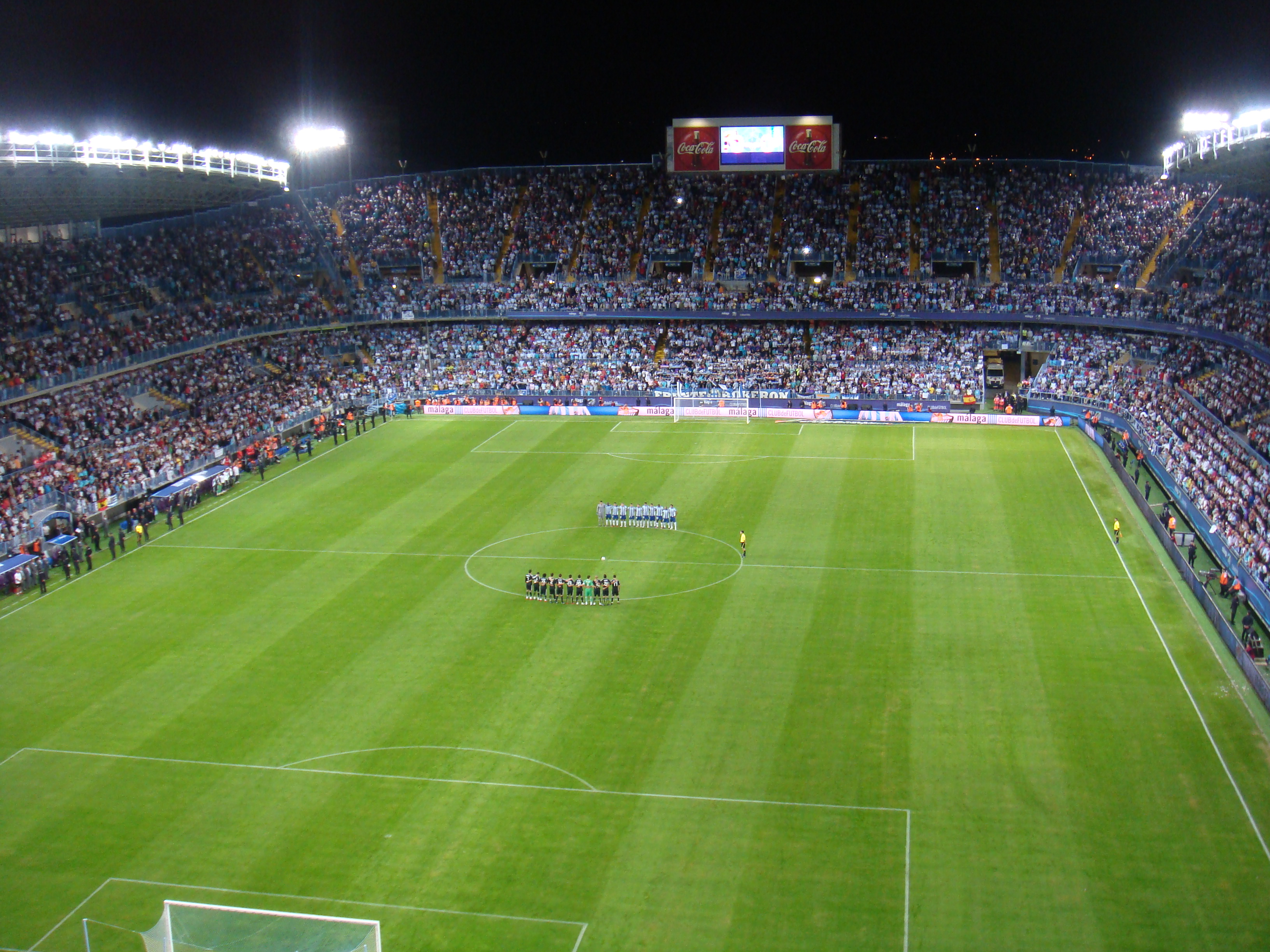
Estadio de La Rosaleda

Despite steering Málaga to their second consecutive tenth-placed finish, Manzano could not prevent a lackluster side from being relegated, and they finished at the bottom of the league with a paltry 24 points to their name.

Málaga began the new second division season well. However, their form dipped dramatically and for two of the remaining six weeks were in the relegation zone. Málaga managed to address this situation and survived their first Segunda season.

The 2007–08 Segunda División also began impressively, with seven straight victories. Málaga seemed to be on track for promotion but, after another slump in form, they were overtaken as leaders by Numancia. They needed a victory in their final game, at home to Tenerife, to assure promotion. Two goals from Antonio Hidalgo secured a 2–1 triumph and Málaga returned to the top flight as runners-up.

=== Abdullah Al Thani era (2010–2020) ===
Chart of Málaga CF league performance 1929–2023

Due to the club's economic problems, then-president Fernando Sanz entered conversations with sheikh Abdullah ben Nasser Al Thani to launch an ambitious project. On 11 June 2010, after a week of negotiations, Al Thani became the entity's new owner, being named president on 28 July in the members' meeting.

On 28 June 2010, Jesualdo Ferreira was appointed as coach and Moayad Shatat was appointed as vice president and general manager. Following this prominent players like Salomón Rondón and Eliseu were signed. In November, however, Jesualdo was fired because he had not obtained the desired performance, leaving the club in the relegation zone. Later, Shatat confirmed Manuel Pellegrini as coach.

With "The Caretaker" in charge, it was decided to discard players of the squad and strengthen with players like centre back Martín Demichelis and midfielder Júlio Baptista. A record five consecutive La Liga wins, alongside a draw against Athletic Bilbao at San Mamés at the start of January 2011, helped the team maintain momentum in the league, finishing the 2010–11 season in 11th place.

In preparation for the 2011–12 season, the club signed with Nike as supplier of the club's kits. Málaga also reached a collaboration agreement with UNESCO, which became the principal sponsor of the club's kit. The more prominent signings of that season were the Dutchman Ruud van Nistelrooy, the ex-Lyon French midfielder, Jérémy Toulalan, and the most expensive signing in the club's history, Santi Cazorla, who arrived from Villarreal in a €21 million deal. Other less prominent players like Isco, former Spanish international midfielder Joaquín and left back Nacho Monreal, were key in the successful season which followed. For the first time in its history, the club qualified for the Champions League after finishing the 2011–12 La Liga campaign in fourth. In the Champions League, Málaga were paired with Italian giants Milan and reigning Belgian and Russian champions Anderlecht and Zenit Saint Petersburg, respectively. Málaga made it out of the group stage unbeaten, winning their matches against all three clubs. In the round of 16, the team drew Portuguese champions Porto, losing the first away game 1–0 while winning at home 2–0, advancing to the quarter-finals. In a highly anticipated tie against German champions Borussia Dortmund, the home game ended 0–0, leaving Malagauistas with a reasonable chance to advance on the back of a draw in the away fixture. In a second leg marked by controversial referee decisions, the scoreboard showed 1–2 at the 90 minute mark, seemingly ensuring Málaga's place in the semi-finals, but two late goals by Marco Reus (90+1st minute) and Felipe Santana (90+3rd minute) turned the table in favour of the home team. Immediately after the elimination, club president Abdullah ben Nasser Al Thani announced a formal complaint would be filed with UEFA and FIFA.

The following season, Málaga was banned by UEFA, along with other clubs for its debts. In a statement the agency declared that the club would be excluded from a subsequent competition, for which it would otherwise qualify, in the next four seasons. However, the ban was eventually downgraded to one season and the club was excluded from the 2013–14 Europa League.

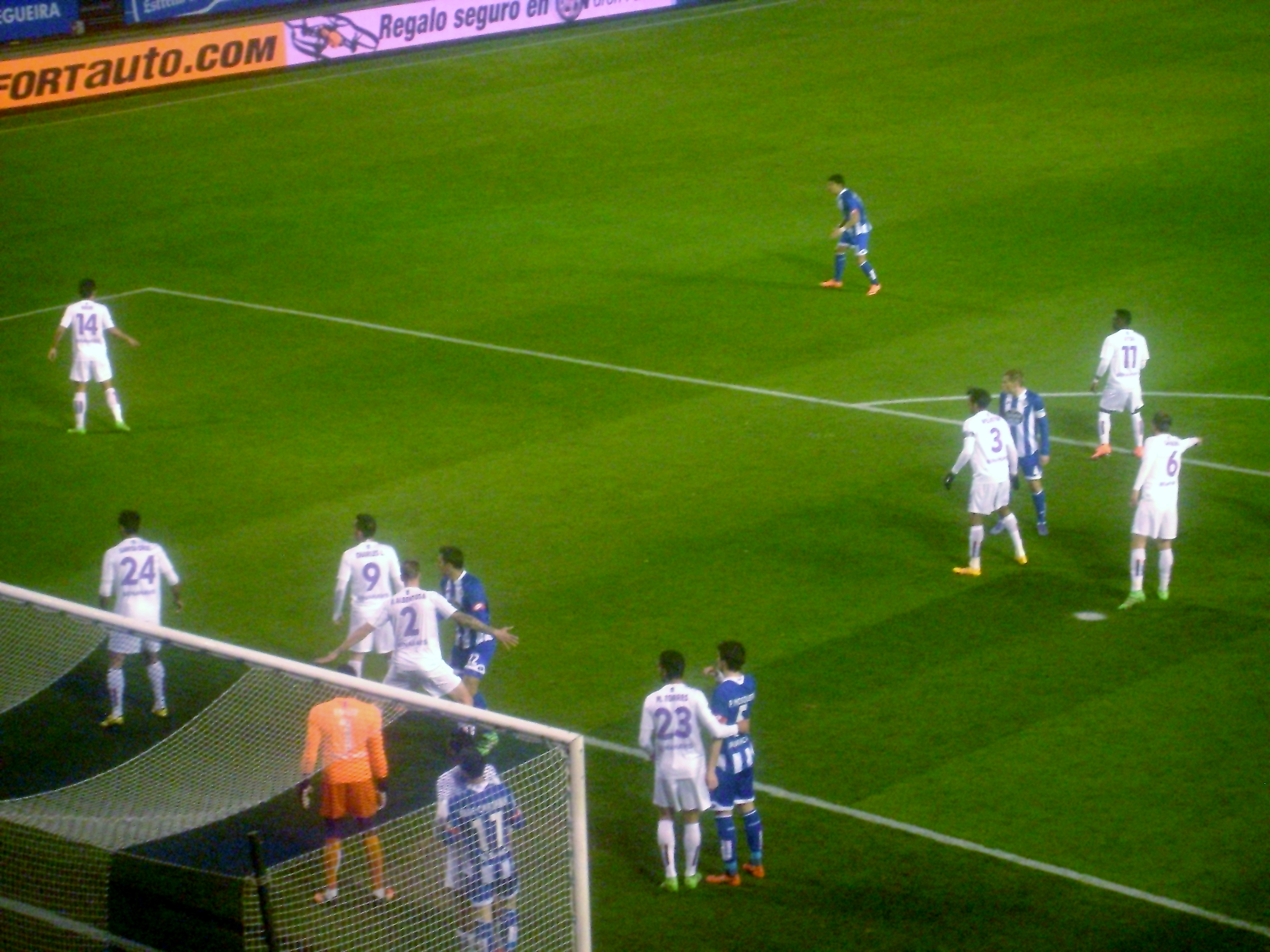
Deportivo de La Coruña vs. Málaga CF.

In the summer of 2013, Isco was sold to Real Madrid, Joaquín to Fiorentina and midfielder Jérémy Toulalan to Monaco. The manager also changed, with Bernd Schuster taking over from Manuel Pellegrini.

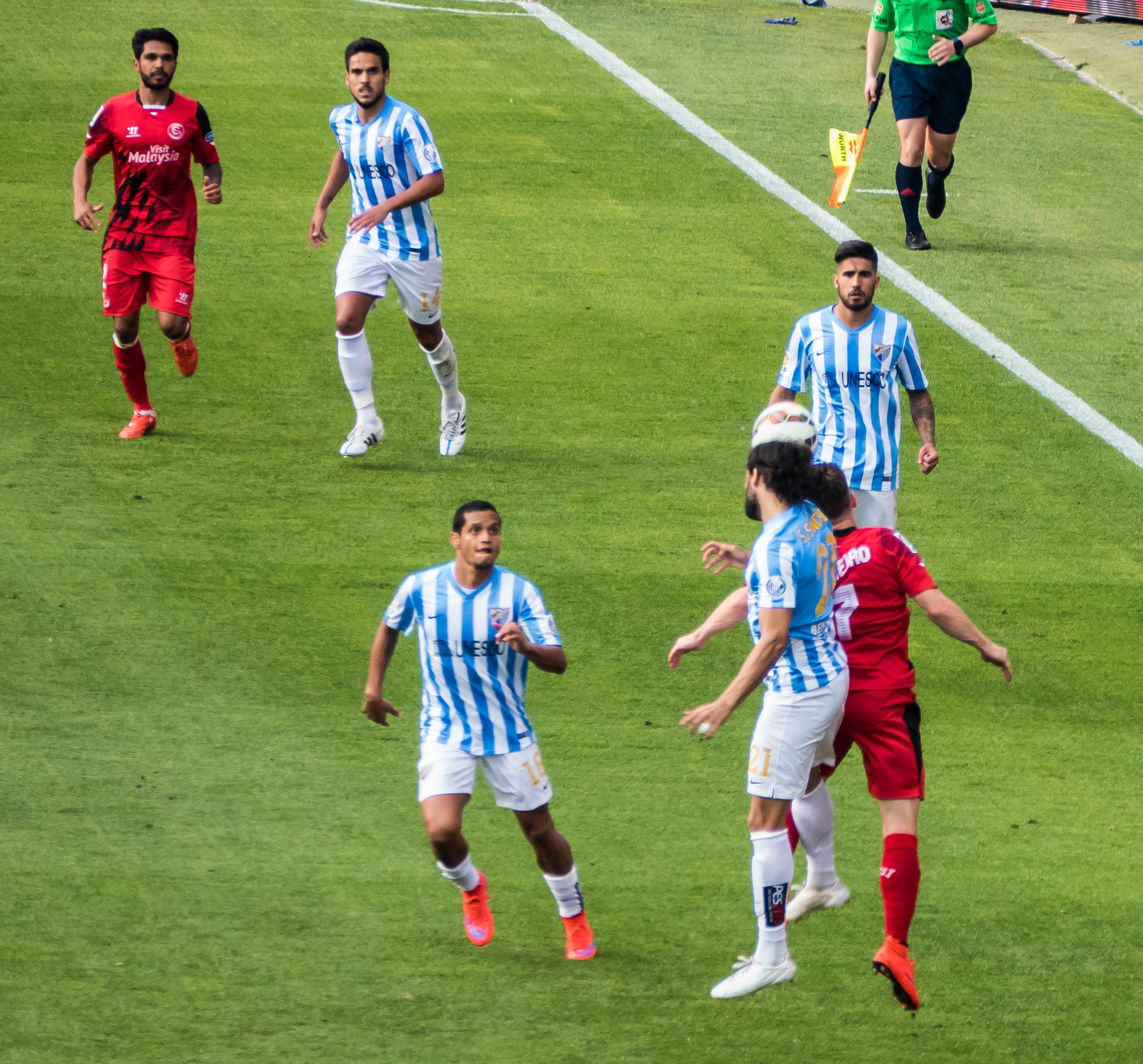
A home fixture versus Sevilla in May 2015

Following 2013, Málaga encountered a steady decline that would result in them finishing in a lower position in the league each year. On 19 April 2018, Málaga faced Levante U.D. hoping to end their run of ten consecutive defeats that left them placed 20th in LaLiga. However, fate took a turn for the worse and Málaga conceded a goal to Levante's Emmanuel Boateng in stoppage time to see the final score at 0–1. This loss meant that Málaga would be relegated to the Segunda División, ending a run of ten consecutive seasons in the top flight.

In 2019, Málaga came close to being promoted to La Liga, finishing third in the Segunda División, but was eliminated in the first round of the play-offs by Deportivo de La Coruña. For the 2019–20 Segunda División season, Víctor Sánchez del Amo continued as coach.

In February 2020, a Spanish judge ruled that Abdullah Al Thani was to be excluded from management and control of Málaga, citing irregularities, and Jose Maria Muñoz became the court-appointed administrator of the club. In the following years, Al Thani failed to appear in court, and investigations stalled. Eventually, in April 2026, the Provincial Court of Málaga issued an arrest warrant for Abdullah and a few other members of the Qatari royal family, with charges including misappropriation of funds and imposing abusive agreements. Club funds were allegedly used by the family as "a personal piggy bank", siphoned off "to finance an incredibly lavish lifestyle". After continued non-compliance, a Spanish judge upgraded the judicial pressure to an international arrest warrant which spans 29 European countries within the Schengen Area and can also be executed in countries that hold extradition treaties with Spain, being actively processed through Interpol.

=== Under judicial administration ===
In May 2023, Málaga fell into the third tier for the first time since 1998. In their first season back in the Primera Federación, the team finished third in Group 2 before earning promotion by defeating Gimnàstic 4–3 on aggregate in the 2024 Primera Federación play-offs. Málaga secured their return to La Liga after eight years with a 2–1 away victory over Almería in the second leg of the 2026 Segunda División play-offs.

== Honours ==
=== Domestic ===
- Segunda División
  - Winners (1): 1998–99
- Segunda División B
  - Winners (1): 1997–98
- Tercera División
  - Winners (3): 1963–64, 1992–93, 1994–95

=== International ===
- UEFA Champions League
  - Quarter-finals (1): 2012–13
- UEFA Europa League
  - Quarter-finals (1): 2002–03
- UEFA Intertoto Cup:
  - Winners (1): 2002

=== Friendly ===
- Trofeo Costa del Sol
  - Winners (10): 2005, 2008, 2010, 2011, 2012, 2015, 2016, 2023, 2025, 2026
- Schalke 04 Cup
  - Winners (1): 2014
- Copa EuroAmericana
  - Runner-up (1): 2015

=== Trofeo Costa del Sol ===
Between 1961 and 1983, the club organised its own summer tournament, the Trofeo Costa del Sol. In this first age of the tournament, the club won this competition themselves on three occasions, beating Real Madrid, Red Star Belgrade and Derby County in the finals. After a long time of inactivity from 1983 onwards, the competition was revived in 2003. Since then, the club has won the competition on seven occasions, beating Newcastle United, Real Betis, Parma, Peñarol, Everton, Lekhwiya, Sampdoria and Fulham in the finals. All ten trophies are currently placed together in the Museo Malaguista in La Rosaleda.

=== Eastern Andalusia Derby ===
Málaga's main rivalry is with Granada CF, known as the Derby of eastern Andalusia. The two clubs are located approximately 90 kilometers apart.

== First-team squad ==
As of 21 November 2026

Note: Flags indicate national team as defined under FIFA eligibility rules; some limited exceptions apply. Players may hold more than one non-FIFA nationality.

No.	Pos.	Nation	Player
1	GK	ESP	Alfonso Herrero (vice-captain)
2	MF	SWE	Jens Cajuste (on loan from Napoli)
3	DF	ESP	Carlos Puga
4	DF	ESP	Einar Galilea
5	DF	ESP	Álex Pastor
6	MF	ESP	Ramón (captain)
7	MF	MAR	Haitam
8	MF	ESP	Carlos Dotor (on loan from Celta)
9	FW	ESP	Chupete
10	MF	ESP	David Larrubia
11	MF	ESP	Joaquín Muñoz
12	DF	ESP	José Salinas (on loan from Espanyol)
13	GK	ESP	Carlos López
14	MF	ESP	Rafa

No.	Pos.	Nation	Player
15	DF	ESP	Ángel Recio
16	DF	ESP	Diego Murillo
17	FW	ESP	Eneko Jauregi
18	MF	ESP	Pablo Martínez
19	MF	ESP	Juan Cruz (on loan from Leganés)
20	DF	ESP	Fernando Calero
21	FW	ESP	Adrián Niño
22	MF	ESP	Dani Lorenzo
23	MF	ESP	Izan Merino
24	MF	ESP	Julen Lobete
25	DF	ESP	Juan Berrocal
31	DF	ESP	Rafita
35	MF	IRL	Aarón Ochoa
39	DF	MAR	Adam Aznou (on loan from Everton)

=== Reserve team ===
Note: Flags indicate national team as defined under FIFA eligibility rules; some limited exceptions apply. Players may hold more than one non-FIFA nationality.

No.	Pos.	Nation	Player
26	DF	ESP	Óscar
28	MF	NGR	Otu

No.	Pos.	Nation	Player
30	GK	ESP	Andrés Céspedes
32	MF	ESP	Juani

=== Out on loan ===
Note: Flags indicate national team as defined under FIFA eligibility rules; some limited exceptions apply. Players may hold more than one non-FIFA nationality.

No.	Pos.	Nation	Player
—	DF	ESP	Pablo Arriaza (at Estepona until 30 June 2027)

== Personnel ==
=== Current technical staff ===
Position	Staff
Head coach	(Spain) Juan Francisco Funes
Assistant coach	(Spain) Juan Carlos Andrés
Fitness coach	(Spain) Julio Rodríguez (Spain) Dani Jiménez
Goalkeeping coach	(Spain) 'Caco' De la Torre
Physiotherapists	(Spain) Josemi Escobar (Spain) Fernando Lacomba (Spain) Emilio Merchán
Equipment manager	(Spain) Migue Zambrana
Head of medical services	(Spain) Pablo Campos
Rehabilitation coach	(Spain) José Antonio Lizana
Analyst	(Guatemala) Juan Roldán (Spain) José Antonio 'Capa' (Spain) Juan Roldán
Team manager	(Spain) Raúl Iznata

Last updated: 24 November 2025
Source: Málaga CF (in Spanish)

== Seasons ==
=== Recent seasons ===
Season	Div.	Pos.	Pld	W	D	L	GF	GA	Pts	Copa del Rey	Notes
1999–2000	1D	12th	38	11	15	12	55	50	48	Second Round	
2000–01	1D	8th	38	16	8	14	60	61	56	Second Round	
2001–02	1D	10th	38	13	14	11	44	44	53	Round of 32	
2002–03	1D	13th	38	11	13	14	44	49	46	Round of 16	Quarter-finals UEFA Cup
2003–04	1D	10th	38	15	6	17	50	55	51	Round of 16	
2004–05	1D	10th	38	15	6	17	40	48	51	Round of 32	
2005–06	1D	20th	38	5	9	24	36	68	24	Third Round	Relegated
2006–07	2D	15th	42	14	13	15	49	50	55	Round of 16	
2007–08	2D	2nd	42	20	12	10	58	42	72	Round of 32	Promoted
2008–09	1D	8th	38	15	10	13	55	59	55	Round of 32	
2009–10	1D	17th	38	7	16	15	42	48	37	Round of 16	
2010–11	1D	11th	38	13	7	18	54	68	46	Round of 16	
2011–12	1D	4th	38	17	7	14	54	53	58	Round of 16	
2012–13	1D	6th	38	16	9	13	53	50	57	Quarter-finals	Quarter-finals Champions League
2013–14	1D	11th	38	12	9	17	39	46	45	Round of 32	
2014–15	1D	9th	38	14	8	16	42	48	50	Quarter-finals	
2015–16	1D	8th	38	12	12	14	38	35	48	Round of 32	
2016–17	1D	11th	38	12	10	16	49	55	46	Round of 32	
2017–18	1D	20th	38	5	5	28	24	61	20	Round of 32	Relegated
2018–19	2D	3rd	44	21	11	12	53	36	74	Second Round	
2019–20	2D	14th	42	11	20	11	35	33	53	First Round	
2020–21	2D	12th	42	14	11	17	37	47	53	Round of 32	
2021–22	2D	18th	42	11	12	19	36	57	45	Second Round	
2022–23	2D	20th	42	10	14	18	37	44	44	Second Round	Relegated
2023–24	3D	3rd	38	19	13	6	52	25	70	Round of 32	Promoted
2024–25	2D	16th	42	12	17	13	42	46	53	First Round	
2025–26	2D	4th	42	21	10	11	75	52	73	Second Round	Promoted

=== European record ===
Season	Competition	Round	Opposition	First leg	Second leg	Aggregate
2002	UEFA Intertoto Cup	Third round	(Belgium) Gent	3–0	1–1	4–1
2002	UEFA Intertoto Cup	Semi-finals	(Netherlands) Willem II	2–1	0–1	3–1
2002	UEFA Intertoto Cup	Finals	(Spain) Villarreal	0–1	1–1	2–1
2002–03	UEFA Cup	First round	(Bosnia and Herzegovina) Željezničar	0–0	1–0	1–0
2002–03	UEFA Cup	Second round	(Poland) Amica Wronki	2–1	1–2	4–2
2002–03	UEFA Cup	Third round	(England) Leeds United	0–0	1–2	2–1
2002–03	UEFA Cup	Fourth round	(Greece) AEK Athens	0–0	0–1	1–0
2002–03	UEFA Cup	Quarter-finals	(Portugal) Boavista	1–0	1–0	1–1 (p)
2012–13	UEFA Champions League	Play-off round	(Greece) Panathinaikos	2–0	0–0	2–0
2012–13	UEFA Champions League	Group C	(Russia) Zenit Saint Petersburg	3–0	2–2	1st place
2012–13	UEFA Champions League	Group C	(Belgium) Anderlecht	0–3	2–2	1st place
2012–13	UEFA Champions League	Group C	(Italy) Milan	1–0	1–1	1st place
2012–13	UEFA Champions League	Round of 16	(Portugal) Porto	1–0	2–0	2–1
2012–13	UEFA Champions League	Quarter-finals	(Germany) Borussia Dortmund	0–0	3–2	3–2

=== Season to season ===
- As Club Atlético Malagueño

Season	Tier	Division	Place	Copa del Rey
1948–49	5	2ª Reg.	2nd	
1949–50	4	1ª Reg.	2nd	
1950–51	3	3ª	12th	
1951–52	3	3ª	14th	
1952–53	3	3ª	16th	
1953–54	3	3ª	15th	
1954–55	3	3ª	7th	
1955–56	3	3ª	11th	
1956–57	3	3ª	12th	
1957–58	3	3ª	7th	
1958–59	3	3ª	5th	
1959–60	3	3ª	6th	
1960–61	3	3ª	7th	
1961–62	3	3ª	4th	
1962–63	3	3ª	2nd	
1963–64	3	3ª	1st	
1964–65	3	3ª	4th	
1965–66	3	3ª	4th	
1966–67	3	3ª	5th	
1967–68	3	3ª	8th	
1968–69	3	3ª	12th	
1969–70	4	Reg. Pref.	1st	

Season	Tier	Division	Place	Copa del Rey
1970–71	3	3ª	13th	
1971–72	3	3ª	11th	
1972–73	3	3ª	19th	
1973–74	4	Reg. Pref.	5th	
1974–75	4	Reg. Pref.	6th	
1975–76	4	Reg. Pref.	10th	
1976–77	4	Reg. Pref.	8th	
1977–78	4	3ª	14th	
1978–79	4	3ª	12th	
1979–80	4	3ª	11th	
1980–81	4	3ª	15th	
1981–82	4	3ª	4th	
1982–83	4	3ª	12th	
1983–84	4	3ª	6th	
1984–85	4	3ª	4th	
1985–86	4	3ª	5th	
1986–87	4	3ª	9th	
1987–88	4	3ª	2nd	
1988–89	4	3ª	3rd	
1989–90	4	3ª	5th	
1990–91	4	3ª	6th	
1991–92	4	3ª	4th	

- As an independent team

Season	Tier	Division	Place	Copa del Rey
1992–93	4	3ª	1st	First round
1993–94	3	2ª B	18th	First round

- As Málaga Club de Fútbol

Season	Tier	Division	Place	Copa del Rey
1994–95	4	3ª	1st	First round
1995–96	3	2ª B	5th	First round
1996–97	3	2ª B	5th	Second round
1997–98	3	2ª B	1st	
1998–99	2	2ª	1st	Third round
1999–2000	1	1ª	12th	Second round
2000–01	1	1ª	8th	Second round
2001–02	1	1ª	10th	Round of 32
2002–03	1	1ª	13th	Round of 32
2003–04	1	1ª	10th	Round of 16
2004–05	1	1ª	10th	Round of 32
2005–06	1	1ª	20th	Third round
2006–07	2	2ª	15th	Round of 16
2007–08	2	2ª	2nd	Round of 32
2008–09	1	1ª	8th	Round of 32
2009–10	1	1ª	17th	Round of 16
2010–11	1	1ª	11th	Round of 16
2011–12	1	1ª	4th	Round of 16
2012–13	1	1ª	6th	Quarter-finals
2013–14	1	1ª	11th	Round of 32

Season	Tier	Division	Place	Copa del Rey
2014–15	1	1ª	9th	Quarter-finals
2015–16	1	1ª	8th	Round of 32
2016–17	1	1ª	11th	Round of 32
2017–18	1	1ª	20th	Round of 32
2018–19	2	2ª	3rd	Second round
2019–20	2	2ª	14th	First round
2020–21	2	2ª	12th	Round of 32
2021–22	2	2ª	18th	Second round
2022–23	2	2ª	19th	Second round
2023–24	3	1ª Fed.	3rd	Round of 32
2024–25	2	2ª	16th	First round
2025–26	2	2ª	4th	Second round
2026–27	1	1ª		TBD

- 18 seasons in La Liga
- 10 seasons in Segunda División
- 1 season in Primera Federación
- 4 seasons in Segunda División B
- 39 seasons in Tercera División

== Stadium information ==
- La Rosaleda Stadium

== Notable players ==
Argentina

- (Argentina) Willy Caballero
- (Argentina) Martín Demichelis
- (Argentina) Javier Saviola
- (Argentina) Ariel Zárate

Brazil

- (Brazil) Júlio Baptista

Cameroon

- (Cameroon) Carlos Kameni

Chile

- (Chile) Manuel Iturra

Costa Rica

- (Costa Rica) Paulo Wanchope

Denmark

- (Denmark) Patrick Mtiliga

France

- (France) Jérémy Toulalan

Mexico

- (Mexico) Guillermo Ochoa

Morocco

- (Morocco) Nordin Amrabat
- (Morocco) Youssef En-Nesyri
- (Morocco) Munir Mohamedi
- (Morocco) Nabil Baha

Netherlands

- (Netherlands) Joris Mathijsen
- (Netherlands) Ruud van Nistelrooy

Panama

- (Panama) Julio Dely Valdes

Paraguay

- (Paraguay) Roque Santa Cruz

Portugal

- (Portugal) Duda
- (Portugal) Edgar
- (Portugal) Eliseu

Serbia

- (Serbia) Zdravko Kuzmanović

Spain

- (Spain) Apoño
- (Spain) Francesc Arnau
- (Spain) Basti
- (Spain) Francisco Bravo
- (Spain) Javier Calleja
- (Spain) Ignacio Camacho
- (Spain) Santi Cazorla
- (Spain) Pedro Contreras
- (Spain) Jesús Gámez
- (Spain) Gerardo
- (Spain) Luis Hernández
- (Spain) Antonio Hidalgo
- (Spain) Fernando Hierro
- (Spain) Isco
- (Spain) Joaquín
- (Spain) Juanito
- (Spain) Domingo Larrainzar
- (Spain) Albert Luque
- (Spain) Miguel Ángel
- (Spain) Nacho Monreal
- (Spain) José María Movilla
- (Spain) Recio
- (Spain) Miguel Ángel Roteta
- (Spain) Francisco Rufete
- (Spain) Salva Ballesta
- (Spain) Sergio Sánchez
- (Spain) Sandro
- (Spain) Fernando Sanz
- (Spain) Vicente Valcarce
- (Spain) Manuel Velázquez
- (Spain) Esteban Vigo

Uruguay

- (Uruguay) Sebastián Fernández
- (Uruguay) Marcelo Romero
- (Uruguay) Darío Silva

Venezuela

- (Venezuela) Juanpi
- (Venezuela) Salomón Rondón
- (Venezuela) Roberto Rosales

== Previous coaches ==
- (Morocco) Abdallah Ben Barek (1969–70)
- (Spain) Antonio Benítez (1976–979)
- (Argentina) Ricardo Albis (1994)
- (Spain) Antonio Benítez (1994–95)
- (Spain) Pepe Cayuela (1996)
- (Argentina) Ricardo Albis (1997)
- (Spain) Tolo Plaza (1997)
- (Spain) Ismael Díaz (1997–98)
- (Spain) Joaquín Peiró (1 July 1998 – 16 June 2003)
- (Spain) Juande Ramos (1 July 2003 – 14 June 2004)
- (Spain) Gregorio Manzano (2004–05)
- (Spain) Antonio Tapia (12 January 2005 – 30 January 2006)
- (Spain) Manolo Hierro (2006)
- (Spain) Marcos (2006)
- (Spain) Juan Muñiz (2006–08)
- (Spain) Antonio Tapia (1 July 2008 – 30 June 2009)
- (Spain) Juan Muñiz (2009–10)
- (Portugal) Jesualdo Ferreira (2010)
- (Spain) Rafa Gil (interim) (2010)
- (Chile) Manuel Pellegrini (5 November 2010 – 23 June 2013)
- (Germany) Bernd Schuster (12 June 2013 – 16 May 2014)
- (Spain) Javi Gracia (1 July 2014 – 24 May 2016)
- (Spain) Juande Ramos (27 May 2016 – 27 December 2016)
- (Uruguay) Marcelo Romero (28 December 2016 – 6 March 2017)
- (Spain) Míchel (7 March 2017 – 13 January 2018)
- (Spain) José González (13 January 2018 – 20 June 2018)
- (Spain) Juan Muñiz (20 June 2018 – 14 April 2019)
- (Spain) Víctor Sánchez (15 April 2019 – 11 January 2020)
- (Spain) Sergio Pellicer (11 January 2020 – 31 May 2021)
- (Spain) José Alberto (1 June 2021 – 24 January 2022)
- (Spain) Natxo González (27 January 2021 – 2 April 2022)
- (Argentina) Pablo Guede (2 April 2022 – 21 September 2022)
- (Spain) Pepe Mel (21 September 2022 – 25 January 2023)
- (Spain) Sergio Pellicer (25 January 2023 – 18 November 2025)

== See also ==
- Atlético Malagueño
- CD Málaga
- Trofeo Costa del Sol
- Football in Spain
