= Abdullah bin Nasser Al Thani (businessman) =

Qatari businessman

Abdullah bin Nasser bin Abdullah Al Ahmed Al Thani
- Occupation: Businessman
- Known for: Owner of Málaga CF
- Relatives: Ahmed bin Muhammed Al Thani

Sheikh Abdullah bin Nasser bin Abdullah Al Ahmed Al Thani (Arabic: الشيخ عبد الله بن ناصر بن عبد الله الأحمد آل ثاني) is a Qatari businessman. He is from the Qatari ruling family and a distant relative of Qatar's previous ruler Sheikh Hamad. He owns several thoroughbred racing horses.

He also owned the Spanish football club Málaga CF, at the time in Segunda División, the but in 2020 a judge ruled that he was to be excluded from management and control of the club, citing irregularities. After years of failing to appear in court and stalled investigations, in July 2026 a Spanish court issued an international warrant for the search, arrest, and imprisonment of himself and other members of his family, to be processed through Interpol and executed across 29 European countries within the Schengen Area and any other countries that hold extradition treaties with Spain.

== Family ==
According to the Royal Ark website, he is the great-grandson of Ahmed bin Muhammed Al Thani, the brother of later emir Jassim bin Mohammed Al Thani and son of Hakim Mohammed bin Al Thani. His father, Nasser bin Abdullah bin Ahmed Al Thani, was the chairman of Nasser bin Abdulla & Sons Group, and after he died in 1990 chairmanship of the Group was bequeathed to Abdullah.

His namesake, Abdullah bin Nasser bin Khalifa Al Thani, is his second cousin, and the preceding emir of Qatar, Hamad bin Khalifa Al Thani, is a distant cousin.

== Career ==
He studied Business Management and Administration and Law in Egypt and is dedicated to the world of business, participating in the management and as a shareholder of numerous companies through which he is present in more than thirty countries and employs around three thousand workers, in addition to being part of his country's government. Al Thani was appointed a non-executive member of board of directors of Doha Bank in June 1996. He is also a member of the board of Nasser Bin Abdulla & Sons Group.

In June 2010, Sheikh Abdullah bought Málaga CF from Lorenzo Sanz, whose son Fernando Sanz and president of the club at the time, controlled with total management the acquisition. The reported price was €36 million. In addition to his management of Málaga Football Club, he is an honorary member of the Qatari club Al-Rayyan, which has football, basketball, handball, volleyball and table tennis sections.

Sheikh Abdullah has been quoted as saying, in anticipation of the 2022 FIFA World Cup to be held in Qatar, he had hoped to have European clubs branch into the Persian Gulf market. He is currently a member of the board of directors of Qatar Equestrian Federation.

== European corruption charges and arrest warrant ==
In February 2020, a Spanish judge ruled that Abdullah was to be excluded from management and control of Málaga CF, citing irregularities. In the following years, Al Thani failed to appear in court, and investigations stalled. Eventually, in April 2026, the Provincial Court of Málaga issued an arrest warrant for Abdullah and a few other members of the royal family, with charges including misappropriation of funds and imposing abusive agreements. Club funds were allegedly used by the family as "a personal piggy bank", siphoned off "to finance an incredibly lavish lifestyle". After continued non-compliance, a Spanish judge upgraded the judicial pressure to an international arrest warrant which spans 29 European countries within the Schengen Area and can also be executed in countries that hold extradition treaties with Spain, being actively processed through Interpol.
