= David Larrubia =

Spanish association football player

Personal information
- Full name: David Larrubia Romano
- Date of birth: 20 April 2002 (age 24)
- Place of birth: Málaga, Spain
- Height: 1.72 m (5 ft 8 in)
- Position: Attacking midfielder

Team information
- Current team: Málaga
- Number: 10

Youth career
- 2010–2012: Roma Luz
- 2012–2020: Málaga

Senior career*
Years	Team	Apps	(Gls)
2019–2022	Málaga B	49	(4)
2020–	Málaga	121	(16)
2022–2023	→ Mérida (loan)	36	(4)

International career
2019	Spain U17	2	(1)
2019	Spain U18	5	(0)
- * Club domestic league appearances and goals as of 19 August 2026

David Larrubia Romano (born 20 April 2002) is a Spanish footballer who plays as an attacking midfielder for Málaga CF.

== Club career ==
Born in Málaga, Andalusia, Larrubia joined local club Málaga's youth setup in 2012 from Roma Luz. He made his senior debut with the reserves on 8 September 2019, playing the last 26 minutes of a 1–1 Tercera División away draw against Almería.

Larrubia made his first team debut on 13 September 2020, coming on as a late substitute for Cristian Rodríguez in a 0–2 loss at Tenerife in the Segunda División championship. On 9 November, he renewed his contract until 2023.

On 1 August 2022, Larrubia extended his contract for a further year, and was loaned to Primera Federación side Mérida for the season, with an option to buy. He returned to his parent club in July 2023, now also in the third division, and established himself as a regular starter before renewing his link until 2027 on 26 February 2024.

Larrubia helped the Boquerones to return to the second division in 2024, and scored his first professional goal on 27 October of that year, netting the winner in a 1–0 home success over SD Eibar. He further extended his contract until 2028 on 30 September 2025, and ended the campaign with twelve goals in 44 appearances overall as the club achieved promotion to La Liga.

Larrubia made his debut in the main category of Spanish football on 19 August 2026, starting in a 2–0 away loss to Atlético Madrid.
