= 2026–27 La Liga =

96th season of La Liga

La Liga
- Season: 2026–27
- Dates: 15 August 2026 – 30 May 2027
- Matches: 120
- Goals: 345 (2.88 per match)
- Top goalscorer: Raphinha (15 goals)
- Biggest home win: Barcelona 7–2 Racing Santander (16 September 2026); Celta Vigo 5–0 Racing Santander (19 September 2026); Barcelona 6–1 Alavés (31 October 2026)
- Biggest away win: Elche 0–5 Barcelona (23 August 2026); Valencia 0–5 Barcelona (6 September 2026)
- Highest scoring: Barcelona 7–2 Racing Santander (16 September 2026)
- Longest winning run: Barcelona (9 matches)
- Longest unbeaten run: Barcelona (9 matches)
- Longest winless run: Málaga (13 matches)
- Longest losing run: Valencia (4 matches)
- Highest attendance: 75,242; Real Madrid 1–0 Villarreal (10 October 2026)
- Lowest attendance: 3,742; Rayo Vallecano 2–1 Espanyol (15 September 2026)
- Total attendance: 3,798,272
- Average attendance: 33,318
- All statistics correct as of 7 November 2026.

The 2026–27 La Liga, also known as La Liga EA Sports due to sponsorship reasons, is the 96th season of La Liga, Spain's top-flight football competition. Barcelona are the two-time defending champions, having won their 29th title the previous season.

== Teams ==
=== Promotion and relegation (pre-season) ===
A total of twenty teams contest the league, including seventeen sides from the 2025–26 season and three promoted from the 2025–26 Segunda División. This includes the two top teams from the Segunda División, and the winners of the promotion play-offs.

Teams relegated to Segunda División

The first team to be relegated from La Liga was Oviedo, after Girona earned a point in a 1–1 draw against Rayo Vallecano on 11 May 2026, after only a single season in the top tier. The second and third team to be relegated were Girona and Mallorca on 23 May 2026, after four and five years in top division respectively.

Teams promoted from Segunda División

On 16 May 2026, Racing Santander became the first side to mathematically be promoted, assured of a return to the top flight after a 14-year absence, following a 4–1 win against Real Valladolid. Deportivo A Coruña became the second team to be promoted on the penultimate day after defeating Real Valladolid 2–0, returning to La Liga after an eight-year absence. Málaga, absent for a similar duration from La Liga, was the final promoted team by defeating Almería 2–1 in the promotion play-offs.

Promoted from 2025–26 Segunda División	Relegated from 2025–26 La Liga
Racing Santander; Deportivo A Coruña; Málaga	Mallorca; Girona; Oviedo

Location of teams in 2026–27 La Liga
Location of Community of Madrid teams in 2026–27 La Liga

=== Stadiums and locations ===
Team	Location	Stadium	Capacity
Alavés	Vitoria-Gasteiz	Campo de Fútbol de Mendizorrotza	19,840
Athletic Bilbao	Bilbao	Estadio San Mamés	53,289
Atlético Madrid	Madrid	Estadio Riyadh Air Metropolitano	70,813
Barcelona	Barcelona	Spotify Camp Nou	62,652
Celta Vigo	Vigo	Estadio ABANCA Balaídos	24,870
Deportivo A Coruña	A Coruña	Estadio ABANCA-Riazor	32,660
Elche	Elche	Estadio Martínez Valero	31,388
Espanyol	Cornellà de Llobregat	Estadi Cornellà-El Prat	37,776
Getafe	Getafe	Estadio Coliseum	16,500
Levante	Valencia	Estadi Ciutat de València	26,354
Málaga	Málaga	Estadio La Rosaleda	30,044
Osasuna	Pamplona	Estadio El Sadar	23,576
Racing Santander	Santander	Campos de Sport de El Sardinero	22,308
Rayo Vallecano	Madrid	Estadio Ontime Butarque (Note: Rayo Vallecano was barred from playing at the Vallecas Stadium because local authorities suspended the stadium's license over serious health, hygiene, and safety concerns. The ban was lifted on 14 September 2026.); Campo de Fútbol de Vallecas	14,500; 14,708
Real Betis	Seville	Estadio La Cartuja de Sevilla	70,000
Real Madrid	Madrid	Bernabéu	83,186
Real Sociedad	San Sebastián	Reale Arena	39,313
Sevilla	Seville	Estadio Ramón Sánchez-Pizjuán	43,883
Valencia	Valencia	Camp de Mestalla	49,430
Villarreal	Villarreal	Estadio de la Cerámica	23,008

=== Personnel and sponsorship ===
Team	Manager	Captain	Kit manufacturer	Main kit sponsor	Other kit sponsor(s)
Alavés	(Spain) Quique Sánchez Flores	(Spain) Antonio Sivera	Macron	MK TIYU News	List: Side: Araba/Álava; Back: Kutxabank; Sleeves: EBPay; Shorts: Grupo EMB
Athletic Bilbao	(Germany) Edin Terzić	(Ghana) Iñaki Williams	Castore	Kutxabank	List: Side: None; Back: Digi; Sleeves: None; Shorts: Vueling
Atlético Madrid	(Argentina) Diego Simeone	(Spain) Koke	Nike	Riyadh Air	List: Side: None; Back: Visit Rwanda; Sleeves: Kraken; Shorts: Ergo - DKV
Barcelona	(Germany) Hansi Flick	(Brazil) Raphinha	Nike	Spotify	List: Side: None; Back: Barça Foundation; Sleeves: Midea; Shorts: None
Celta Vigo	(Spain) Claudio Giráldez	(Spain) Iago Aspas	Hummel	Estrella Galicia 0,0	List: Side: None; Back: Abanca; Sleeves: JP Financial; Shorts: Siweb, Grupo Recalvi
Deportivo A Coruña	(Spain) Antonio Hidalgo	(Spain) Diego Villares	Nike	Estrella Galicia 0,0	List: Side: None; Back: Abanca; Sleeves: None; Shorts: Bualá
Elche	(Argentina) Martín Anselmi	(Spain) Pedro Bigas	Nike	Flexicar	List: Side: None; Back: Kosner; Sleeves: MGS Seguros; Shorts: Next Energía
Espanyol	(Spain) Eder Sarabia	(Spain) Javi Puado	Kelme	Arctempus	List: Side: None; Back: None; Sleeves: None; Shorts: Škoda
Getafe	(Spain) José Bordalás	(Togo) Djené	Joma	Tecnocasa	List: Side: None; Back: Lowi; Sleeves: ODTY News; Shorts: Mapei, Grand Class
Levante	(Portugal) Luís Castro	(Spain) Pablo Martínez	Macron	Sesame HR	List: Side: None; Back: Baleària, Lowi; Sleeves: None; Shorts: Jysk, Internxt
Málaga	(Spain) Juan Francisco Funes	(Spain) Ramón Enríquez	Hummel	Sabor a Málaga	List: Side: Málaga; Back: Grupo Dental Clinics, Benahavis; Sleeves: MGS Seguros; Shorts: None
Osasuna	(Spain) Jagoba Arrasate	(Spain) Kike Barja	Macron	Kosner	List: Side: None; Back: ktech; Sleeves: Celer Light (Home) / Saltoki Home (Away); Shorts: Clínica Universidad de Navarra, Crypto Fund Trader
Racing Santander	(Spain) José Alberto	(Spain) Íñigo Sainz-Maza	Austral	Eni Plenitude	List: Side: Digi; Back: Banco Santander, Cantabria Labs; Sleeves: MGS Seguros; Shorts: Jove Group, Blendio
Rayo Vallecano	(Spain) Beñat San José	(Spain) Óscar Valentín	Umbro	Digi	List: Side: None; Back: None; Sleeves: Griffin Core Solutions; Shorts: None
Real Betis	(Chile) Manuel Pellegrini	(Spain) Isco	Hummel	Gree Electric	List: Side: None; Back: Prima Seguros, Trainline; Sleeves: Drive REVEL; Shorts: AUS Global
Real Madrid	(Portugal) José Mourinho	(Uruguay) Federico Valverde	Adidas	Emirates	List: Side: None; Back: None; Sleeves: HP Inc.; Shorts: None
Real Sociedad	(United States) Pellegrino Matarazzo	(Spain) Mikel Oyarzabal	Joma	Baghdadi Capital	List: Side: None; Back: Kutxabank; Sleeves: None; Shorts: Siweb
Sevilla	(Spain) Luis García	(Chile) Gabriel Suazo	Adidas	Fundación 1890	List: Side: None; Back: None; Sleeves: Wizz Air; Shorts: None
Valencia	(Mexico) Javier Aguirre	(Spain) José Gayà	Puma	TM Real Estate Group	List: Side: None; Back: None; Sleeves: Divina Seguros; Shorts: Škoda
Villarreal	(Spain) Iñigo Pérez	(Spain) Gerard Moreno	Joma	Pamesa Cerámica	List: Side: None; Back: Ascale; Sleeves: None; Shorts: None

Notes

- Puma is the official ball supplier for La Liga.
- Macron is the official uniform supplier of the Referee's Committee of the Royal Spanish Football Federation.
- Würth and BKT are the official sponsor of the Referee's Committee of the Royal Spanish Football Federation.
- Duracell is the official sponsor for La Liga for the fourth official boards to indicate additional time at the end of a match, as well as player substitutions.

=== Managerial changes ===
Team	Outgoing manager	Manner of departure	Date of vacancy	Position in the table	Incoming manager	Date of appointment	
Athletic Bilbao	(Spain) Ernesto Valverde	End of contract	Date of vacancy	24 May 2026	Pre-season	(Germany) Edin Terzić	1 July 2026
Villarreal	(Spain) Marcelino	End of contract	(Spain) Iñigo Pérez	24 May 2026	Pre-season	1 June 2026	
Osasuna	(Italy) Alessio Lisci	Sacked	25 May 2026	(Spain) Luis Miguel Ramis	Pre-season	10 June 2026	
Elche	(Spain) Eder Sarabia	Resigned	27 May 2026	(Argentina) Martín Anselmi	Pre-season	13 June 2026	
Rayo Vallecano	(Spain) Iñigo Pérez	End of contract	29 May 2026	(Spain) Beñat San José	Pre-season	18 June 2026	
Real Madrid	(Spain) Álvaro Arbeloa	Mutual consent	9 June 2026	(Portugal) José Mourinho	Pre-season	13 June 2026	
Valencia	(Spain) Carlos Corberán	Sacked	13 September 2026	20th	(Spain) Óscar Sánchez (caretaker)	13 September 2026	
Valencia	(Spain) Óscar Sánchez	End of caretaker spell	23 September 2026	19th	(Mexico) Javier Aguirre	23 September 2026	
Osasuna	(Spain) Luis Miguel Ramis	Sacked	12 October 2026	16th	(Spain) Jagoba Arrasate	12 October 2026	
Espanyol	(Spain) Manolo González	Sacked	27 October 2026	18th	(Spain) Eder Sarabia (Note: Sergio García was the caretaker head coach in the 11th round against Villarreal.)	28 October 2026	

== League table ==
Pos	Team	Pld	W	D	L	GF	GA	GD	Pts	Qualification or relegation
1	Barcelona	13	12	0	1	51	15	+36	36	Qualification for the UEFA Champions League league phase
2	Real Madrid	13	11	0	2	33	11	+22	33	Qualification for the UEFA Champions League league phase
3	Atlético Madrid	13	10	1	2	26	10	+16	31	Qualification for the UEFA Champions League league phase
4	Real Betis	13	8	3	2	21	16	+5	27	Qualification for the UEFA Champions League league phase
5	Real Sociedad	13	7	1	5	23	23	0	22	Qualification for the UEFA Europa League league phase
6	Sevilla	13	5	4	4	18	20	−2	19	Qualification for the UEFA Conference League play-off round
7	Racing Santander	13	5	2	6	20	32	−12	17	
8	Athletic Bilbao	12	4	4	4	15	12	+3	16	
9	Alavés	13	4	4	5	18	18	0	16	
10	Villarreal	13	4	3	6	19	18	+1	15	
11	Espanyol	13	4	3	6	14	14	0	15	
12	Deportivo A Coruña	13	3	6	4	16	17	−1	15	
13	Osasuna	13	4	3	6	13	23	−10	15	
14	Celta Vigo	13	2	7	4	11	12	−1	13	
15	Rayo Vallecano	12	3	3	6	15	22	−7	12	
16	Valencia	13	3	3	7	9	20	−11	12	
17	Getafe	13	3	3	7	8	21	−13	12	
18	Levante	12	2	5	5	16	21	−5	11	Relegation to Segunda División
19	Elche	12	2	4	6	14	20	−6	10	Relegation to Segunda División
20	Málaga	13	0	5	8	9	24	−15	5	Relegation to Segunda División

Updated to match(es) played on 22 November 2026. Source: LaLiga EA Sports
Rules for classification: 1) Points; 2) Head-to-head points; 3) Head-to-head goal difference; 4) Goal difference; 5) Goals scored; 6) Fair-play points (if three or more teams tied); 7) Play-off at neutral site.
(Note: Head-to-head record is used only after all the matches between the teams in question have been played)

== Results ==
Home \ Away	ALA	ATH	ATM	BAR	CEL	DEP	ELC	ESP	GET	LEV	MAL	OSA	RAC	RAY	BET	RMA	RSO	SEV	VAL	VIL
Alavés	—	a	1–2			3–1			3–0		1–1	5–2					a		0–1	1–0
Athletic Bilbao	0–0	—	3–0	a			1–1	0–1	4–0			a				a	2–1	1–3		
Atlético Madrid			—	1–2		1–0					2–0	4–0				2–1				2–2
Barcelona	6–1	2–0		—				a	3–0				7–2	5–2		1–2				3–2
Celta Vigo	2–1	0–2			—	a				0–0	1–1	1–2	5–0		0–0					
Deportivo A Coruña					a	—	1–1			1–1		2–1			1–1			0–1	3–1	
Elche				0–5	0–0		—								0–2	2–3	2–3		0–1	
Espanyol			0–1	a		0–0	1–3	—		3–0						1–2		1–1		
Getafe			0–3		1–1	1–1			—		1–0		1–0	1–1				3–1		
Levante		3–1	0–2	2–4						—					5–2			3–3	a	
Málaga						1–1		1–1		0–0	—		1–2				2–5			1–3
Osasuna	a	1–1						0–2	1–0	0–0	1–0	—	2–0	1–1			a			
Racing Santander	2–1						3–2	2–1					—			0–3	3–2		2–2	2–2
Rayo Vallecano	1–1				3–0		0–3	2–1					3–2	—					0–1	
Real Betis				2–5					1–0		2–1	5–2			—	1–0	1–0	a		
Real Madrid		a	a	a	2–1						4–0			4–1		—	4–1	4–1		1–0
Real Sociedad	a	a	0–3		0–0	3–2		2–1		2–1		a		1–0			—			
Sevilla	0–0		1–3	1–3								2–0		2–1	1–1			—	1–0	
Valencia		0–0		0–5	0–0					a					0–1	0–3	2–3		—	1–2
Villarreal						2–3	0–0	0–1	2–0	3–1					1–2				a	—

Updated to match(es) played on 22 November 2026. Source: LaLiga EA Sports
Legend: Blue = home team win; Yellow = draw; Red = away team win.
For upcoming matches, an "a" indicates there is an article about the rivalry between the two participants.

== Season statistics ==
As of 8 November 2026

First goal of the season:
(Argentina) Nahuel Tenaglia (Alavés) against Getafe (15 August 2026)

=== Top goalscorers ===
Rank	Player	Club	Goals
1	(Brazil) Raphinha	Barcelona	15
2	(France) Kylian Mbappé	Real Madrid	13
3	(Spain) Lamine Yamal	Barcelona	10
4	(Morocco) Yassir Zabiri	Racing Santander	9
5	(Croatia) Ante Budimir	Osasuna	8
6	(Spain) Sergio Camello	Rayo Vallecano	7
6	(Spain) Fermín López	Barcelona	7
8	(Spain) Roberto Fernández	Espanyol	6
8	(Spain) Fer Niño	Elche	6
10	(Gabon) Pierre-Emerick Aubameyang	Deportivo A Coruña	5
10	(Spain) Álex Baena	Atlético Madrid	5
10	(Argentina) Lucas Boyé	Alavés	5
10	(Spain) Roger Brugué	Levante	5
10	(Spain) Adrián Niño	Málaga	5

=== Hat-tricks ===
Player	For	Against	Result	Date	Round
(France) Kylian Mbappé	Real Madrid	Real Sociedad	4–1 (H)	26 August 2026	2
(Morocco) Yassir Zabiri	Racing Santander	Elche	3–2 (H)	28 August 2026	3
(Argentina) Lucas Boyé	Alavés	Osasuna	5–2 (H)	6 September 2026	4
(Brazil) Raphinha	Barcelona	Racing Santander	7–2 (H)	16 September 2026	6
(Brazil) Raphinha	Barcelona	Sevilla	3–1 (A)	19 September 2026	7

=== Zamora Trophy ===
The Zamora Trophy is awarded by newspaper Marca to the goalkeeper with the lowest goals-to-games ratio. A goalkeeper has to play at least 28 matches of 60 or more minutes to be eligible for the trophy.

Rank	Player	Club	Matches	Goals against	Average
1	(Slovenia) Jan Oblak	Atletico Madrid	13	10	0.77
2	(Belgium) Thibaut Courtois	Real Madrid	12	10	0.83
3	(Romania) Ionuț Radu	Celta Vigo	13	12	0.92
4	(Spain) Unai Simón	Atletic Club	12	12	1.00
5	(Hungary) Peter Gulácsi	Villarreal	9	10	1.10

=== Discipline ===
==== Player ====
- Most yellow cards: 5
  - (Senegal) Pathé Ciss (Rayo Vallecano)
  - (Spain) Roger Hinojo (Espanyol)
  - (Colombia) Johan Mojica (Getafe)
  - (Spain) Jorge Salinas (Racing Santander)
- Most red cards: 2
  - (Spain) Mario Martín (Getafe)

==== Team ====
- Most yellow cards: 35
  - Espanyol
  - Getafe
- Fewest yellow cards: 16
  - Levante
- Most red cards: 5
  - Getafe
- Fewest red cards: 0
  - Barcelona
  - Levante
  - Málaga
  - Osasuna

== Awards ==
=== Monthly awards ===
Month	Manager of the Month		Player of the Month		U23 Player of the Month		Goal of the Month			Save of the Month			References
Month	Manager	Club	Player	Club	Player	Club	Player	Club	Against	Player	Club	Against	References
August	(Spain) Quique Sánchez Flores	Alavés	(Brazil) Raphinha	Barcelona	(Spain) Javi Hernández	Espanyol	(South Korea) Lee Kang-in	Atlético Madrid	Málaga	(Spain) Unai Simón	Athletic Bilbao	Barcelona	
September	(Germany) Hansi Flick	Barcelona	(Brazil) Raphinha	Barcelona	(Morocco) Yassir Zabiri	Racing Santander	(Portugal) João Cancelo	Barcelona	Racing Santander	(Spain) Álvaro Valles	Real Betis	Villarreal	
October	(Portugal) José Mourinho	Real Madrid	(France) Kylian Mbappé	Real Madrid	(Spain) Adrián Niño	Málaga	(Spain) Lamine Yamal	Barcelona	Real Betis	(Indonesia) Emil Audero	Rayo Vallecano	Getafe	

== See also ==
- 2026–27 Copa del Rey
- 2026–27 Segunda División
- 2026–27 Primera Federación
- 2026–27 Segunda Federación
- 2026–27 Tercera Federación
