= 2024–25 Elche CF season =

Elche CF
2024–25 season
- Head coach: Eder Sarabia
- Stadium: Estadio Martínez Valero
- Segunda División: 2nd (promoted)
- Copa del Rey: Round of 16
- Average home league attendance: 18,328
Home colours	Away colours

The 2024–25 season was the 102nd season in the history of the Elche CF, and the club's second consecutive season in the Segunda División. In addition to the domestic league, the club participated in the Copa del Rey.

Eder Sarabia was appointed coach on 24 June.

== Transfers ==
=== In ===
Pos.	Player	Transferred from	Fee	Date	Source
DF	(Austria) David Affengruber	(Austria) Sturm Graz	Free	28 August 2024	
FW	(Guinea) Sory Kaba	(Spain) Las Palmas	Loan	30 August 2024	
MF	(Spain) Pejiño	(Spain) Las Palmas	Undisclosed	3 February 2025	
MF	(Spain) Marc Aguado	(Spain) Zaragoza	Undisclosed	3 February 2025	
MF	(Spain) Germán Valera	(Spain) Valenca	Loan	3 February 2025	

=== Out ===
Pos.	Player	Transferred to	Fee	Date	Source
DF	(Spain) Carlos Clerc		Contract terminated	31 January 2025	
MF	(Dominican Republic) Rafael Núñez	(Spain) FC Cartagena	Loan	3 February 2025	
MF	(Spain) Raúl Guti	(Spain) Zaragoza	Unisclosed	3 February 2025	

== Friendlies ==
=== Pre-season ===
20 July 2024 Friendly	Elche	2–0	Al-Ittihad	La Nucía
19:00	Plano 22'; Barzic 54'			Stadium: Estadio Olímpico Camilo Cano; Referee: Álvaro Cánovas García Villarrubia

24 July 2024 Friendly	Elche	3–0	CF Intercity
10:00

26 July 2024 Friendly	Elche	1–0	Nottingham Forest
20:00

31 July 2024 Friendly	Elche	0–6	Castellón	San Pedro del Pinatar
19:00				Referee: Martínez Montalbán

3 August 2024 Friendly	Zaragoza	1–0	Elche
19:00

== Competitions ==
=== Overall record ===
Competition	First match	Last match	Starting round	Final position	Record							
Competition	First match	Last match	Starting round	Final position	Pld	W	D	L	GF	GA	GD	Win %
Segunda División	18 August 2024	1 June 2025	Matchday 1	2nd	42	22	11	9	59	34	+25	52.38
Copa del Rey	30 October 2024	15 January 2025	First round	Round of 16	4	3	0	1	8	4	+4	75.00
Total					46	25	11	10	67	38	+29	54.35

Last updated: 1 June 2025
Source: Soccerway

=== Segunda División ===
==== League table ====
Pos	Team	Pld	W	D	L	GF	GA	GD	Pts	Qualification or relegation
1	Levante (C, P)	42	22	13	7	69	42	+27	79	Promotion to La Liga
2	Elche (P)	42	22	11	9	59	34	+25	77	Promotion to La Liga
3	Oviedo (O, P)	42	21	12	9	56	42	+14	75 (Note: Oviedo finished ahead of Mirandés on head-to-head goal difference: Oviedo 4–1 Mirandés, Mirandés 1–0 Oviedo.)	Qualification for promotion playoffs
4	Mirandés	42	22	9	11	59	40	+19	75	Qualification for promotion playoffs
5	Racing Santander	42	20	11	11	65	51	+14	71	Qualification for promotion playoffs

Source: LaLiga Hypermotion
Rules for classification: 1) Points; 2) Head-to-head points; 3) Head-to-head goal difference; 4) Goal difference; 5) Goals scored; 6) Fair-play points
(Note: Head-to-head record is used only after all the matches between the teams in question have been played)
(C) Champions; (O) Play-off winners; (P) Promoted

==== Results summary ====
Overall								Home						Away					
Pld	W	D	L	GF	GA	GD	Pts	W	D	L	GF	GA	GD	W	D	L	GF	GA	GD
33	17	9	7	45	26	+19	60	13	2	2	31	10	+21	4	7	5	14	16	−2

Last updated: 30 March 2025.
Source: soccerway

==== Results by round ====
Round	1	2	3	4	5	6	7	8	9	10	11	12	13	14	15	16	17	18	19	20	21	22	23	24	25	26	27	28	29	30	31	32	33	34	35	36	37	38	39	40	41	42
Ground	H	A	H	A	H	H	A	A	H	H	A	H	A	H	A	H	A	H	A	H	A	H	A	H	A	H	A	H	A	H	A	H	A	H	A	H	A	H	A	H	A	H
Result	L	L	W	L	D	W	W	L	D	W	D	W	W	L	D	W	D	W	D	W	W	W	D	W	L	W	D	W	L	W	D	W	W									
Position	20	21	14	19	18	14	11	13	13	11	11	10	6	10	9	8	6	6	6	6	4	2	4	2	5	3	4	1	5	3	3	1	1									

Updated to match(es) played on 30 March 2025. Source: worldfootball
A = Away; H = Home; W = Win; D = Draw; L = Loss

==== Matches ====
The league fixtures was released on 26 June 2024.

Win Draw Loss Fixtures

18 August 2024 1	Elche	0–1	Huesca	Elche
19:30 CEST	Febas (yellow card) 13'; Plano (yellow card) 36'; Barzic (yellow card) 42'	Report	Loureiro (yellow card) 24', (goal) 87'; Kortajarena (yellow card) 90+3'; Jiménez (yellow card) 90+6'	Stadium: Estadio Martínez Valero; Attendance: 15,059; Referee: Daniel Palencia Caballero

25 August 2024 2	Albacete	1–0	Elche	Albacete
19:00 CEST	Fidel 52'; Marchán (yellow card) 80'; Juanma (yellow card) 84'	Report	Castro (yellow card) 90+1'	Stadium: Estadio Carlos Belmonte; Attendance: 11,400; Referee: Manuel Jesús Orellana Cid

2 September 2024 3	Elche	3–1	Córdoba	Elche
21:30 CEST	Santiago 33'; Fernández (penalty missed) 43'; Castro 62' (pen.); R. Núñez 79'	Report	Sala (yellow card) 3'; Genaro (yellow card) 38'; Casas 90+3'	Stadium: Estadio Martínez Valero; Attendance: 15,264; Referee: Jon Ander González Esteban

8 September 2024 4	Zaragoza	3–0	Elche	Zaragoza
18:30 CEST	Soberón 37', 68', (yellow card) 45'; Serrano 84'	Report	Diaby (yellow card) 11'; Josan (yellow card) 29'; Á. Núñez (yellow card) 31'; Plano (red card) 54'; Kaba (yellow card) 77'; Fernández (yellow card) 83'	Stadium: La Romareda; Attendance: 21,024; Referee: Rubén Ávalos Barrera

15 September 2024 5	Elche	2–2	Granada	Elche
21:00 CEST	Fernández 29' (pen.); Mourad 65'; Josan (yellow card) 74'	Report	Miquel (yellow card) 5'; Ri. Sánchez (yellow card) 46'; Uzuni 55'; Williams 57'; Martínez (yellow card) 78'; Villar (yellow card) 85'	Stadium: Estadio Martínez Valero; Attendance: 15,455; Referee: Óliver de la Fuente Ramos

22 September 2024 6	Elche	1–0	Mirandés	Elche
18:30 CEST	Castro (yellow card) 24'; Salvador (yellow card) 66'; Mourad 71'	Report	Lachuer (yellow card) 12'; Gutiérrez (yellow card) 46'; Homenchenko (yellow card) 90+2'	Stadium: Estadio Martínez Valero; Attendance: 16,276; Referee: Carlos Muñiz Muñoz

28 September 2024 7	Málaga	0–3	Elche	Málaga
21:00 CEST	Dioni (yellow card) 45+2'; Sánchez (yellow card) 64'; Molina (yellow card) 82'; Puga (yellow card) 90+3'; Castel (yellow card) 90+4'	Report	Álvarez 3', (yellow card) 30'; Affengruber (yellow card) 20'; Fernández 49'; Febas (yellow card) 55'; Barzic (yellow card) 68'; Mourad 77' (pen.)	Stadium: Estadio La Rosaleda; Attendance: 26,377; Referee: Salvador Lax Franco

5 October 2024 8	Racing Ferrol	1–0	Elche	Ferrol
14:00 CEST	Purić (yellow card) 25'; Jauregi 28'; Delgado (yellow card) 31'; Naldo (yellow card) 31'; Correa (yellow card) 90+6'	Report	Salinas (yellow card) 38'; Fernández (yellow card) 67'; Diaby (yellow card) 73'; Álvarez (yellow card) 90+6'	Stadium: Estadio Municipal de A Malata; Attendance: 5,489; Referee: José Antonio Sánchez Villalobos

13 October 2024 9	Elche	0–0	Deportivo La Coruña	Elche
21:00 CET	Aleix Febas (yellow card) 65'; José Salinas (yellow card) 85'	Report	Bouldini (yellow card) 80'; José Ángel (yellow card) 89'	Stadium: Estadio Martínez Valero; Attendance: 15,810; Referee: (Spain) Rubén Ávalos Barrera

20 October 2024 10	Elche	2–1	Sporting Gijón	Elche
18:30 CET	Óscar Plano 49'; Rashani 66'	Report	Pablo García (yellow card) 35'; Daniel Queipo (yellow card) 74'; Jonathan Dubasin 77' (yellow card) 80'; Róber Pier (yellow card) 86'; Cote (yellow card) 90+2'; Gaspar Campos (yellow card) 90+8'; Caicedo (yellow card) 90+8'	Stadium: Estadio Martínez Valero; Attendance: 17,421; Referee: (Spain) Manuel Orellana Cid

23 October 2024 11	FC Cartagena	0–0	Elche	Cartagena
21:00 CET	Kiko (yellow card) 13'	Report		Stadium: Estadio Cartagonova; Attendance: 5,637; Referee: (Spain) Oliver De la Fuente Ramos

27 October 2024 12	Elche	1–0	Burgos	Elche
16:15 CET	Rodri Mendoza 25' (yellow card) 78'; Barzic (yellow card) 87'	Report	Miguel Atienza (yellow card) 50'; Iván Morante (yellow card) 80'	Stadium: Estadio Martínez Valero; Attendance: 9,708; Referee: (Spain) Miguel Sesma Espinosa

2 November 2024 13	Eibar	0–2	Elche	Eibar
14:00 CET	Peru Nolaskoain (yellow card) 13'; José Corpas (yellow card) 58'; Sergio Álvarez (yellow card) 86'	Report	Álvarez 41'; Daoudi 45'	Stadium: Ipurua Municipal Stadium; Attendance: 4,389; Referee: (Spain) Rafael Sánchez López

8 November 2024 14	Elche	1–2	Almería	Elche
20:30 CET	José Salinas 4'; Fernández (yellow card) 60'; Mario Gaspar (yellow card) 66'; Raúl Guti (yellow card) 90+1'	Report	Marc Pubill (yellow card) 14'; Álex Centelles (yellow card) 34'; Lopy 37' (yellow card) 38'; Baba (yellow card) 42'; Suárez 54'; Arnau Puigmal (yellow card) 74'; Fernando Martínez (yellow card) 79'; Fettal (yellow card) 90+3'	Stadium: Estadio Martínez Valero; Attendance: 20,689; Referee: (Spain) Manuel Pérez Hernández

16 November 2024 15	Levante	1–1	Elche	Valencia
18:30 CET	Roger Brugué 73'; Unai Elgezabal (yellow card) 79'; Adrián de la Fuente (yellow card) 90+4'; Andrés Fernández (yellow card) 90+5'	Report	Álvaro Núñez (yellow card) 11'; Fernández (yellow card) 27'; Álvarez 33'; Pedro Bigas (yellow card) 71'; Rodri Mendoza (yellow card) 78'	Stadium: Estadi Ciutat de València; Attendance: 19,177; Referee: (Spain) Iosu Galech Apezteguía

24 November 2024 16	Elche	4–0	Real Oviedo	Elche
21:00 CET	Fernández 5' (pen.) 53'; Yago Santiago (yellow card) 31'; Álvarez 45+3' (yellow card) 51'; Aleix Febas (yellow card) 58'; Castro 83'	Report	Jaime Vázquez (yellow card) 4'; Chaira (yellow card) 82'; Oier Luengo (yellow card) 90+1'; Aarón Escandell (yellow card) 90+5'	Stadium: Estadio Martínez Valero; Attendance: 13,998; Referee: (Spain) Jon González Esteban

30 November 2024 17	Tenerife	1–1	Elche	Santa Cruz de Tenerife
20:00 CET	Aarón Martín (yellow card) 3'; Diarra 30'; Maikel Mesa (yellow card) 59'; Waldo Rubio (yellow card) 62'; Mellot (yellow card) 69' (yellow-red card) 83'	Report	Fernández (yellow card) 23' (yellow-red card) 26'; Aleix Febas (yellow card) 35'; Cristian Salvador (yellow card) 74'; Castro (yellow card) 86'; Kaba 90'; Raúl Guti (yellow card) 90+3'	Stadium: Estadio Heliodoro Rodríguez López; Attendance: 12,098; Referee: (Spain) Daniel Palencia Caballero

7 December 2024 18	Elche	2–1	Cádiz	Elche
14:00 CET	Yago Santiago (yellow card) 26' (goal) 90+4'; Josan (yellow card) 30' (goal) 82'	Report	Javier Ontiveros 8'; Roger Martí (yellow card) 17'; Ocampo (yellow card) 37' (yellow-red card) 54'; Fali (yellow card) 48'; Rubén Sobrino (yellow card) 90'	Stadium: Estadio Martínez Valero; Attendance: 15,019; Referee: (Spain) Miguel Sesma Espinosa

14 December 2024 19	Eldense	0–0	Elche	Elda
18:30 CET	Víctor García (yellow card) 33'; Nacho Quintana (yellow card) 49'; Unai Ropero (yellow card) 86'	Report	José Salinas (yellow card) 58'; Aleix Febas (yellow card) 62'	Stadium: Nuevo Pepico Amat; Attendance: 3,802; Referee: (Spain) Rubén Ávalos Barrera

19 December 2024 20	Elche	3–0	Racing de Santander	Elche
19:00 CET	Álvarez 25' (yellow card) 36'; Mourad Daoudi 73'; Castro 90+6'	Report	Juan Carlos Arana (yellow card) 77'; Javi Montero (red card) 88'	Stadium: Estadio Martínez Valero; Attendance: 15,292; Referee: (Spain) Eder Mallo Fernández

22 December 2024 21	Castellón	0–2	Elche	Castellón de la Plana
16:15 CET	Salva Ruiz (yellow card) 78'	Report	Mourad Daoudi 27' (yellow card) 40'; Pedro Bigas 45+1'; José Salinas (yellow card) 71'	Stadium: Estadio Skyfi Castalia; Attendance: 11,901; Referee: (Spain) Manuel Orellana Cid

12 January 2025 22	Elche	1–0	Real Zaragoza	Elche
16:15 CET	Josan (yellow card) 39'; Álvaro Núñez (yellow card) 51'; Fernández (yellow card) 75'; Mourad Daoudi (yellow card) 80'; Rashani 90+3' (yellow card) 90+4'	Report	Marc Aguado (yellow card) 4'; Dani Tasende (yellow card) 21'; Adrián Liso (yellow card) 26'; Enrique Clemente (yellow card) 72'; Alberto Marí (yellow card) 90+2'	Stadium: Estadio Martínez Valero; Attendance: 20,081; Referee: (Spain) Rafael Sánchez López

18 January 2025 23	Sporting Gijón	1–1	Elche	Gijón
18:30 CET	Guille Rosas 37' (yellow card) 41'; Daniel Queipo (yellow card) 44'; César Gelabert (yellow card) 67'	Report	Álvarez 88'; Rashani (red card) 90+5'	Stadium: El Molinón; Attendance: 21,372; Referee: (Spain) Germán Cid Camacho

24 January 2025 24	Elche	2–0	Eibar	Elche
20:30 CET	Kaba 45'; Castro 74'	Report	Álvaro Carrillo (yellow card) 59' (yellow-red card) 72'	Stadium: Estadio Martínez Valero; Attendance: 18,211; Referee: (Spain) Iosu Galech Apezteguía

1 February 2025 25	Mirandés	3–0	Elche	Miranda de Ebro
14:00 CET	Lachuer (yellow card) 34'; Urko Izeta 39'; Juan Gutiérrez (yellow card) 45+2'; Panichelli 50' 64'	Report	Aleix Febas (yellow card) 20'; José Salinas (yellow card) 22'; Bambo Diaby (yellow card) 38' (yellow-red card) 49'; Álvarez (yellow card) 47'; Kaba (yellow card) 49'; Fernández (yellow card) 62'; Affengruber (yellow card) 81'	Stadium: Estadio Municipal de Anduva; Attendance: 3,486; Referee: (Spain) José Sánchez Villalobos

9 February 2025 26	Elche	2–0	Tenerife	Elche
14:00 CET	Kaba 14' (pen.); Josan (yellow card) 18'; Boayar 90+3'	Report		Stadium: Estadio Martínez Valero; Attendance: 20,366; Referee: (Spain) Miguel González Díaz

17 February 2025 27	Almería	1–1	Elche	Almería
20:30 CET	Edgar González (yellow card) 3'; Robertone (yellow card) 31'; Selvi Clua (yellow card) 32' (yellow-red card) 76'; Arnau Puigmal 85'	Report	José Salinas 59'; Boayar (yellow card) 90+8'	Stadium: UD Almería Stadium; Attendance: 11,531; Referee: (Spain) Jon González Esteban

23 February 2025 28	Elche	2–1	FC Cartagena	Elche
16:15 CET	Affengruber (yellow card) 41'; Germán Valera 60'; Álvarez 63'; José Salinas (yellow card) 68'	Report	Álex Millán 48'; Pablo Cuñat (yellow card) 63'; Sergio Guerrero (yellow card) 82'; Nacho (yellow card) 90+3'	Stadium: Estadio Martínez Valero; Attendance: 19,514; Referee: (Spain) Oliver De la Fuente Ramos

2 March 2025 29	Racing Santander	2–0	Elche	Santander
21:00 CET	Juan Carlos Arana 5'; Aritz Aldasoro 23'; Iñigo Vicente (yellow card) 28'; Mario García (yellow card) 43'; Víctor Meseguer (yellow card) 62'	Report	Marc Aguado (yellow card) 16'; Mourad Daoudi (yellow card) 39'	Stadium: Campos de Sport de El Sardinero; Attendance: 20,134; Referee: (Spain) Daniel Palencia Caballero

8 March 2025 30	Elche	3–1	Castellón	Elche
18:30 CET	Álvarez 30'; Germán Valera 37'; Pedro Bigas (yellow card) 68'; John Nwankwo 74'	Report	van den Belt (yellow card) 71'; Óscar Gil 77'	Stadium: Estadio Martínez Valero; Attendance: 17,001; Referee: (Spain) José Luis Guzmán Mansilla

14 March 2025 31	Real Oviedo	1–1	Elche	Oviedo
20:30 CET	Chaira (yellow card) 52'; Santi Cazorla 65' (pen.)	Report	Josan 22'; Bambo Diaby (yellow card) 61'; Álvaro Núñez (yellow card) 85'	Stadium: Estadio Carlos Tartiere; Attendance: 18,750; Referee: (Spain) Manuel Pérez Hernández

22 March 2025 32	Elche	2–0	Eldense	Elche
16:15 CET	Aleix Febas 77'; Pejiño 85'	Report	Diawara (yellow card) 21'; Víctor García (yellow card) 83'	Stadium: Estadio Martínez Valero; Attendance: 24,431; Referee: (Spain) Iosu Galech Apezteguía

30 March 2025 33	Córdoba	1–2	Elche	Córdoba
14:00 CET	Zidane (yellow card) 3'; Carlos Albarrán 28'; Obolskiy (yellow card) 61'; Rubén Alves (yellow card) 63'; Ander Yoldi (yellow card) 89'; Carlos Marín (yellow card) 90+5'	Report	Óscar Plano 15'; Rashani 89'	Stadium: Estadio Nuevo Arcángel; Attendance: 15,627; Referee: (Spain) Álvaro Moreno Aragón

7 April 2025 34	Elche	–	Racing Ferrol	Elche
20:30 CET				Stadium: Estadio Martínez Valero

=== Copa del Rey ===
30 October 2024 First Round	CD Coria	0-3	Elche	Coria
20:30 CET	Juanjo Rubio (yellow card) 16'; Gonzalo Llerena (yellow card) 55'; Juanjo Chavalés (yellow card) 74'	Report	Mario Gaspar 15'; Daoudi 26'; Álvarez 82'	Stadium: Estadio La Isla; Attendance: 3,000; Referee: (Spain) José Luis Guzmán Mansilla

3 December 2024 Second Round	Yeclano	0-1	Elche	Yecla
20:00 CET	Pau Pérez (yellow card) 45'; Gabi García (yellow card) 50'; Juanje (red card) 73'; José Manuel Gil (yellow card) 90+3'	Report	Óscar Plano 70'; Fernández (yellow card) 79'	Stadium: Estadio La Constitución; Attendance: 4,500; Referee: (Spain) José Antonio Sánchez Villalobos

5 January 2025 Round of 32	Elche	4-0	Las Palmas	Elche
12:00 CET	Aleix Febas (yellow card) 12'; Rodri Mendoza (yellow card) 37' (goal) 44'; José Salinas (yellow card) 51' (goal) 61'; Affengruber 56'; Pedro Bigas (yellow card) 65'; Fernández 71'; Raúl Guti (yellow card) 90+3'	Report	Marvin Park (yellow card) 55'	Stadium: Estadio Martínez Valero; Attendance: 18,302; Referee: (Spain) José Luis Munuera Montero

15 January 2025 Round of 16	Elche	0-4	Atlético Madrid	Elche
21:30 CET	Álvarez (yellow card) 7'; Fernández (yellow card) 32' (yellow-red card) 50'; John Nwankwo (yellow card) 34'	Report	Sørloth 8' 29' (pen.); Rodrigo Riquelme 61'; Robin Le Normand (yellow card) 69'; Alvarez 75'	Stadium: Estadio Martínez Valero; Attendance: 26,405; Referee: (Spain) Guillermo Cuadra Fernández
