= 2024–25 UD Almería season =

UD Almería
2024–25 season
- Head coach: Rubi
- Stadium: UD Almería Stadium
- Segunda División: 6th
- Copa del Rey: Round of 16
- Top goalscorer: League: Luis Suárez (27); All: Luis Suárez (31)
- Highest home attendance: 14,347 vs Tenerife
- Lowest home attendance: 8,723 vs Cartagena
- Average home league attendance: 11,452
- Biggest win: Almería 5–0 Eldense
- Biggest defeat: Castellón 5–2 Almería; Castellón 4–1 Almería
Home colours	Away colours	Third colours

The 2024–25 season is the 36th season in the history of the UD Almería, and the club's first season in the Segunda División since 2022. In addition to the domestic league, the team is scheduled to participate in the Copa del Rey.

== Transfers ==
=== In ===
Pos.	Player	Transferred from	Fee	Date	Source
FW	(England) Arvin Appiah	(England) Rotherham United	Loan return	30 June 2024	
DF	(Brazil) Kaiky	(Spain) Albacete	Loan return	30 June 2024	
DF	(Spain) Arnau Solà	(Spain) FC Cartagena	Loan return	30 June 2024	
DF	(Guinea-Bissau) Houboulang Mendes	(Spain) Mirandés	Loan return	30 June 2024	
GK	(Portugal) Luís Maximiano	(Italy) Lazio	€8,100,000	1 July 2024	
DF	(Mozambique) Bruno Langa	(Portugal) Chaves	€1,200,000	1 July 2024	
MF	(Spain) Nico Melamed	(Spain) Espanyol	Free	3 July 2024	
MF	(Ghana) Iddrisu Baba	(Spain) Mallorca		4 July 2024	

=== Out ===
Pos.	Player	Transferred to	Fee	Date	Source
MF	(Argentina) Luka Romero	(Italy) AC Milan	Loan return	30 June 2024	
DF	(Spain) Arnau Solà	(Spain) Villarreal CF B	Loan	11 July 2024	
MF	(Spain) Jonathan Viera		Contract termination	15 July 2024	
MF	(Spain) Adri Embarba	(Spain) Rayo Vallecano	Loan	26 July 2024	
FW	(England) Arvin Appiah	(Portugal) Nacional	Loan	30 July 2024	
FW	(Guinea-Bissau) Marciano Tchami	(Spain) Betis Deportivo Balompié	Loan	14 August 2024	

== Friendlies ==
=== Pre-season ===
20 July 2024 Friendly	Almería	2–1	Granada	Motril
19:30 UTC+2	Suárez 1'; Baptistão 23'; Kaiky (yellow card) 39'; Robertone (yellow card) 70'	Report	Weissman 36'; Villar (yellow card) 42'	Stadium: Escribano Castilla; Referee: Domínguez Cervantes

21 July 2024 Friendly	Benfica	3–1	Almería	Thonon-les-Bains, France
15:30 UTC+2

27 July 2024 Friendly	Málaga	0–1	Almería
19:30 UTC+2			Centelles 24'

28 July 2024 Friendly	Almería	1–1	Al Sadd SC	Málaga
19:00	Baptistão 40'	Report	Paulo Otávio 65'; (penalty missed) 73'	Stadium: La Quinta Football Center; Referee: Ignacio De Santisteban Adame

1 August 2024 Friendly	Almería	1–1	Algeciras
09:30	Baptistão 49'		Rodri 2'

4 August 2024 Friendly	FC Cartagena	1–1	Almería
20:30 UTC+2

== Competitions ==
=== Overall record ===
Competition	First match	Last match	Starting round	Final position	Record							
Competition	First match	Last match	Starting round	Final position	Pld	W	D	L	GF	GA	GD	Win %
Segunda División	18 August 2024	1 June 2025	Matchday 1	6th	42	19	12	11	72	55	+17	45.24
Copa del Rey	30 October 2024	15 January 2025	First round	Round of 16	4	3	0	1	10	6	+4	75.00
Total					46	22	12	12	82	61	+21	47.83

Source: Soccerway

=== Segunda División ===
==== League table ====
Pos	Team	Pld	W	D	L	GF	GA	GD	Pts	Qualification or relegation
4	Mirandés	42	22	9	11	59	40	+19	75 (Note: Oviedo finished ahead of Mirandés on head-to-head goal difference: Oviedo 4–1 Mirandés, Mirandés 1–0 Oviedo.)	Qualification for promotion playoffs
5	Racing Santander	42	20	11	11	65	51	+14	71	Qualification for promotion playoffs
6	Almería	42	19	12	11	72	55	+17	69	Qualification for promotion playoffs
7	Granada	42	18	11	13	65	54	+11	65	
8	Huesca	42	18	10	14	58	49	+9	64	

Source: LaLiga Hypermotion
Rules for classification: 1) Points; 2) Head-to-head points; 3) Head-to-head goal difference; 4) Goal difference; 5) Goals scored; 6) Fair-play points
(Note: Head-to-head record is used only after all the matches between the teams in question have been played)

==== Results summary ====
Overall								Home						Away					
Pld	W	D	L	GF	GA	GD	Pts	W	D	L	GF	GA	GD	W	D	L	GF	GA	GD
42	19	12	11	72	55	+17	69	13	7	1	42	19	+23	6	5	10	30	36	−6

Source: LaLiga Hypermotion

==== Results by round ====
Round	1	2	3	4	5	6	7	8	9	10	11	12	13	14	15	16	17	18	19	20	21	22	23	24	25	26	27	28	29	30	31	32	33	34	35	36	37	38	39	40	41	42
Ground	A	A	H	A	H	H	A	H	A	A	H	A	H	A	H	A	H	A	H	A	H	A	H	A	H	A	H	A	H	A	H	A	H	A	H	A	H	H	A	H	A	H
Result	D	W	D	L	L	D	L	W	L	W	W	D	W	W	W	W	W	D	W	W	D	W	D	L	D	L	D	D	D	L	W	L	W	L	W	L	W	W	L	W	D	W
Position	13	7	8	12	17	17	20	17	19	17	12	13	9	6	5	2	2	3	2	1	1	1	1	2	2	6	6	7	7	7	7	7	7	7	7	8	7	6	6	6	6	6

Source: LaLiga Hypermotion
A = Away; H = Home; W = Win; D = Draw; L = Loss

==== Matches ====
The match schedule was released on 26 June 2024.

18 August 2024 1	Racing Santander	2–2	Almería	Santander
17:00				Stadium: El Sardinero

24 August 2024 2	Tenerife	0–1	Almería	Santa Cruz de Tenerife
20:30 UTC+1			Melamed 64'	Stadium: Estadio Heliodoro Rodríguez López

31 August 2024 3	Almería	1–1	Sporting Gijón	Almería
21:30				Stadium: UD Almería Stadium

8 September 2024 4	Eldense	1–0	Almería	Elda
18:30	Ortuño 82'			Stadium: Nuevo Pepico Amat

16 September 2024 5	Almería	2–5	Castellón	Almería
20:30				Stadium: UD Almería Stadium

22 September 2024 6	Almería	2–2	Eibar	Almería
21:00	Melamed 57'; Fettal 80'		González 25' (o.g.); Alkain 55'	Stadium: UD Almería Stadium

29 September 2024 7	Levante	4–2	Almería	Valencia
14:00	Brugué 2'; Morales 15'; Kochorashvili 51'; Carlos Álvarez 74'		Arribas 17', 45+2'	Stadium: Estadi Ciutat de València

5 October 2024 8	Almería	2–0	Burgos	Almería
18:30 CET	Suárez 29' (yellow card) 53'; Sergio Arribas (yellow card) 31' (red card) 38'; Nico Melamed (yellow card) 51'; Alejandro Pozo 89'	Report	David González (yellow card) 56'; Aitor Córdoba (yellow card) 57'	Stadium: UD Almería Stadium; Attendance: 10,391; Referee: (Spain) Andrés Fuentes Molina

13 October 2024 9	Real Oviedo	3–2	Almería	Oviedo
16:15 CET	David Costas 12'; Jaime Seoane 18' (yellow card) 76'; Alemão 70'; Paulino de la Fuente (yellow card) 74'	Report	Alejandro Pozo (yellow card) 5'; Suárez 24' 67' (yellow card) 90+6'; Álex Centelles (yellow card) 43'; Radovanović (red card) 63'; Fettal (red card) 79'; Arnau Puigmal (yellow card) 80'	Stadium: Estadio Carlos Tartiere; Attendance: 19,426; Referee: (Spain) Marta Huerta de Aza

20 October 2024 10	Real Zaragoza	1–2	Almería	Zaragoza
18:30 CET	Iván Azón 12'; Baždar (yellow card) 56'; Bernardo Vital (yellow card) 83'	Report	Edgar González (yellow card) 1'; Suárez 9' (pen.) 67'; Baba (yellow card) 18'; Chumi (yellow card) 48'; Gonzalo Melero (yellow card) 78'; Lopy (yellow card) 78'; Fernando Martínez (yellow card) 87'	Stadium: La Romareda; Attendance: 20,814; Referee: (Spain) Sergiu Claudiu Muresan

24 October 2024 11	Almería	3–1	Albacete	Almería
19:00 CET	Léo Baptistão 15' 49'; Lopy (yellow card) 45+3'; Gonzalo Melero (yellow card) 53'; Chumi (yellow card) 55'; Suárez 57'; Álex Centelles (yellow card) 61'	Report	Rai Marchán 26'	Stadium: UD Almería Stadium; Attendance: 10,808; Referee: (Spain) Rubén Ávalos Barrera

27 October 2024 12	Huesca	2–2	Almería	Huesca
18:30 CET	Toni Abad (yellow card) 3'; Iker Unzueta 9'; Diego González (red card) 36'; Javi Hernández (yellow card) 45+3'; Ignasi Vilarrasa 56' (pen.)	Report	Bruno Langa (yellow card) 43'; Álex Centelles (yellow card) 55' (goal) 85'; Sergio Arribas 82'	Stadium: Estadio El Alcoraz; Attendance: 5,223; Referee: (Spain) Dámaso Arcediano Monescillo

8 November 2024 14	Elche	1–2	Almería	Elche
20:30 CET	José Salinas 4'; Fernández (yellow card) 60'; Mario Gaspar (yellow card) 66'; Raúl Guti (yellow card) 90+1'	Report	Marc Pubill (yellow card) 14'; Álex Centelles (yellow card) 34'; Lopy 37' (yellow card) 38'; Baba (yellow card) 42'; Suárez 54'; Arnau Puigmal (yellow card) 74'; Fernando Martínez (yellow card) 79'; Fettal (yellow card) 90+3'	Stadium: Estadio Martínez Valero; Attendance: 20,689; Referee: (Spain) Manuel Pérez Hernández

17 November 2024 15	Almería	2–1	Deportivo La Coruña	Almería
18:30 CET	Edgar González 31'; Léo Baptistão 45+1'	Report	Pablo Vázquez 35'; Dani Barcia (yellow card) 72'	Stadium: UD Almería Stadium; Attendance: 12,814; Referee: (Spain) Sergiu Claudiu Muresan

23 November 2024 16	FC Cartagena	1–2	Almería	Cartagena
14:00 CET	Valles 35'; Sergio Guerrero (yellow card) 54'; Musto (yellow card) 54'	Report	Edgar González (yellow card) 6'; Sergio Arribas 24'; Suárez 65'	Stadium: Estadio Cartagonova; Attendance: 6,786; Referee: (Spain) Daniel Palencia Caballero

26 November 2024 13	Almería	4–0	Córdoba	Almería
20:30 CET	Alejandro Pozo 57'; Léo Baptistão 61' 82'; Suárez 76'	Report	Calderón (yellow card) 59'; Carlos Albarrán (yellow card) 68'; Álex Sala (yellow card) 69'	Stadium: UD Almería Stadium; Attendance: 10,521; Referee: (Spain) Oliver De la Fuente Ramos

30 November 2024 17	Almería	2–1	Granada	Almería
16:15 CET	Gui Guedes (yellow card) 8'; Suárez 83'; Gonzalo Melero (yellow card) 85' (goal) 87'	Report	Pablo Insua (yellow card) 40'; Uzuni 45+1'; Ricard Sánchez (yellow card) 90+3'	Stadium: UD Almería Stadium; Attendance: 13,667; Referee: (Spain) Eder Mallo Fernández

8 December 2024 18	Málaga	1–1	Almería	Málaga
16:15 CET	Fernando Martínez 12' (o.g.); Manu Molina (yellow card) 51'; Luismi (yellow card) 72'	Report	Marc Pubill (yellow card) 20'; Bruno Langa (yellow card) 49'; Lopy (yellow card) 51'; Chumi (yellow card) 56'; Suárez (yellow card) 63'; Álex Pastor 90+6' (o.g.)	Stadium: La Rosaleda Stadium; Attendance: 25,481; Referee: (Spain) Miguel González Díaz

13 December 2024 19	Almería	1–0	Mirandés	Almería
20:30 CET	Léo Baptistão 7'; Chumi (yellow card) 13'; Marc Pubill (yellow card) 25'; Lopy (yellow card) 50'; Sergio Arribas (yellow card) 67'; Gonzalo Melero (yellow card) 71'; Suárez (yellow card) 90+4'	Report	Hugo Rincón (yellow card) 29'; Alberto Reina (yellow card) 72'	Stadium: UD Almería Stadium; Attendance: 13,500; Referee: (Spain) Saúl Ais Reig

18 December 2024 20	Racing de Ferrol	1–4	Almería	Ferrol
19:00 CET	David Castro (yellow card) 16'; Josep Señé (yellow card) 24'; Naldo (yellow card) 26'; Aitor Gelardo 48'	Report	Suárez 33' 51' (pen.) 63'; Sergio Arribas 57'; Rubén Quintanilla (yellow card) 77'	Stadium: Estadio Municipal da Malata; Attendance: 5,346; Referee: (Spain) Jon González Esteban

22 December 2024 21	Almería	1–1	Cádiz	Almería
18:30 CET	Suárez 60' (pen.); Alejandro Pozo (yellow card) 78'; Gonzalo Melero (yellow card) 89'; Perović (yellow card) 90+2'	Report	Javier Ontiveros 43' (yellow card) 55' (yellow-red card) 73'; Brian Ocampo (yellow card) 47'; Carlos Fernández (yellow card) 89'	Stadium: UD Almería Stadium; Attendance: 13,548; Referee: (Spain) Germán Cid Camacho

12 January 2025 22	Córdoba	0–3	Almería	Córdoba
14:00 CET	Álex Sala (yellow card) 26'; Zidane (yellow card) 29'; Carlos Isaac (yellow card) 42'; José Manuel Calderón (red card) 46'; Kuki Zalazar (yellow card) 62'	Report	Suárez (yellow card) 25' (goal) 31' (pen.); Léo Baptistão 51'; Nico Melamed 69'	Stadium: Estadio Nuevo Arcángel; Attendance: 15,594; Referee: (Spain) Álvaro Moreno Aragón

19 January 2025 23	Almería	0–0	Huesca	Almería
21:00 CET	Léo Baptistão (yellow card) 43'	Report	Javi Hernández (yellow card) 5'; Diego González (yellow card) 34'	Stadium: UD Almería Stadium; Attendance: 9,723; Referee: (Spain) Salvador Lax Franco

=== Copa del Rey ===
30 October 2024 First Round	SS Reyes	1-2	Almería	San Sebastián de los Reyes
21:00 CET	Tito 22' (yellow card) 56'	Report	Gui Guedes (yellow card) 14'; Arnau Puigmal 39' 42'; Kaiky (yellow card) 50'; Lopy (yellow card) 90'	Stadium: Municipal Nuevo Matapiñonera; Attendance: 3,000; Referee: (Spain) Iosu Galech Apezteguía

4 December 2024 Second Round	Cultural Leonesa	1-2	Almería	León
20:00 CET	Txus Alba 18'; Víctor José Ruiz Ramos (yellow card) 41'; Juan Artola (yellow card) 90+3'	Report	Nico Melamed 3'; Gonzalo Melero (yellow card) 15'; Luís Maximiano (yellow card) 45'; Léo Baptistão 84'	Stadium: Estadio Reino de León; Referee: (Spain) Andrés Fuentes Molina

4 January 2025 Round of 32	Almería	4-1	Sevilla	Almería
17:30 CET	Milovanović (yellow card) 17' (goal) 49'; Nico Melamed (yellow card) 37'; Suárez 54' 78' 90+6' (pen.); Rubén Quintanilla (yellow card) 90+2'	Report	Isaac Romero 5'; Badé (yellow card) 65'	Stadium: UD Almería Stadium; Attendance: 15,067; Referee: (Spain) Mateo Busquets Ferrer

15 January 2025 Round of 16	Almería	2-3	Leganés	Almería
19:30 CET	Suárez 38'; Lázaro 52'	Report	Altimira 33'; Cissé (yellow card) 43'; de la Fuente 76' (pen.); Raba (yellow card) 81'; García 86'; Nastasić (yellow card) 90+5'	Stadium: UD Almería Stadium; Attendance: 12,843; Referee: (Spain) Ricardo de Burgos Bengoetxea
