= 2024–25 CD Mirandés season =

CD Mirandés
2024–25 season
- Head coach: Alessio Lisci
- Stadium: Estadio Municipal de Anduva
- Segunda División: Pre-season
- Copa del Rey: Pre-season
- Top goalscorer: League: Alberto Reina (1); All: Alberto Reina (1)
- Biggest win: Mirandés 1–0 Córdoba
Home colours	Away colours

The 2024–25 season is the 98th season in the history of the CD Mirandés, and the club's sixth consecutive season in Segunda División. In addition to the domestic league, the team is scheduled to participate in the Copa del Rey.

== Competitions ==
=== Overall record ===
Competition	First match	Last match	Starting round	Record							
Competition	First match	Last match	Starting round	Pld	W	D	L	GF	GA	GD	Win %
Segunda División	16 August 2024	1 June 2025	Matchday 1	1	1	0	0	1	0	+1	100.00
Copa del Rey				0	0	0	0	0	0	+0	—
Total				1	1	0	0	1	0	+1	100.00

Last updated: 16 August 2024
Source: Soccerway

=== Segunda División ===
==== League table ====
Pos	Team	Pld	W	D	L	GF	GA	GD	Pts	Qualification or relegation
2	Elche (P)	42	22	11	9	59	34	+25	77	Promotion to La Liga
3	Oviedo (O, P)	42	21	12	9	56	42	+14	75 (Note: Oviedo finished ahead of Mirandés on head-to-head goal difference: Oviedo 4–1 Mirandés, Mirandés 1–0 Oviedo.)	Qualification for promotion playoffs
4	Mirandés	42	22	9	11	59	40	+19	75	Qualification for promotion playoffs
5	Racing Santander	42	20	11	11	65	51	+14	71	Qualification for promotion playoffs
6	Almería	42	19	12	11	72	55	+17	69	Qualification for promotion playoffs

Source: LaLiga Hypermotion
Rules for classification: 1) Points; 2) Head-to-head points; 3) Head-to-head goal difference; 4) Goal difference; 5) Goals scored; 6) Fair-play points
(Note: Head-to-head record is used only after all the matches between the teams in question have been played)
(O) Play-off winners; (P) Promoted

==== Results summary ====
Overall								Home						Away					
Pld	W	D	L	GF	GA	GD	Pts	W	D	L	GF	GA	GD	W	D	L	GF	GA	GD
27	14	6	7	36	22	+14	48	10	3	1	24	9	+15	4	3	6	12	13	−1

Last updated: 14 February 2025.
Source: soccerway

==== Results by round ====
Round	1	2	3	4	5	6	7	8	9	10	11	12	13	14	15	16	17	18	19	20	21	22	23	24	25	26	27	28	29
Ground	H	A	H	A	H	A	H	H	A	H	A	H	A	H	A	H	A	H	A	H	A	A	H	A	H	A	H	A	H
Result	W	D	D	D	W	L	W	L	W	W	L	W	L	D	W	W	W	W	L	D	W	L	W	L	W	D	W		
Position	4	9	9	9	6	8	6	8	6	2	8	3	7	8	7	4	4	2	3	3	2	4	3	6	3	4	1		

Updated to match(es) played on 14 February 2025. Source: worldfootball
A = Away; H = Home; W = Win; D = Draw; L = Loss

==== Matches ====
The match schedule was released on 26 June 2024.

16 August 2024 1	Mirandés	1–0	Córdoba	Miranda de Ebro
19:00	Reina 25'			Stadium: Anduva; Referee: Miguel González Díaz

1 September 2024 3	Mirandés	0–0	Zaragoza	Miranda de Ebro
19:00				Stadium: Anduva

8 September 2024 4	Racing Ferrol	0–0	Mirandés	Ferrol
14:00				Stadium: Estadio Municipal da Malata

15 September 2024 5	Mirandés	2–0	Albacete	Miranda de Ebro
14:00				Stadium: Anduva

22 September 2024 6	Elche	1–0	Mirandés	Elche
18:30				Stadium: Estadio Martínez Valero

28 September 2024 7	Mirandés	1–0	Huesca	Miranda de Ebro
16:15	Pablo Tomeo 38'; Juan Gutiérrez (yellow card) 58'; Jon Gorrotxategi (yellow card) 80'	Report	Jorge Pulido (yellow card) 19'; Javi Mier (yellow card) 22'; Joaquín Muñoz (yellow card) 32'; Óscar Sielva (yellow card) 42'; Gerard Valentín (yellow card) 67'; Arguigue (yellow card) 90+7'	Stadium: Anduva; Attendance: 3,193; Referee: (Spain) Rubén Ávalos Barrera

5 October 2024 8	Mirandés	0–1	Granada	Miranda de Ebro
16:15 CET	Panichelli (yellow card) 90+5'	Report	Weissman 16' (yellow card) 62'; Loïc Williams (yellow card) 38'; Ignasi Miquel (yellow card) 44'; Ricard Sánchez (yellow card) 45+1'; Corbeanu (yellow card) 90+3'	Stadium: Anduva; Attendance: 3,016; Referee: (Spain) Sergiu Claudiu Muresan

13 October 2024 9	Burgos	0–1	Mirandés	Burgos
18:30 CET	Fer Niño (yellow card) 36'; Miguel Atienza (yellow card) 50'; Dani Ojeda (yellow card) 66'; Iñigo Córdoba (yellow card) 86'; Edu Espiau (yellow card) 90+4'	Report	Hugo Rincón (yellow card) 31' (goal) 81'; Raúl Fernández (yellow card) 90+8'; Víctor Parada (yellow card) 90+10'	Stadium: Estadio El Plantío; Attendance: 11,300; Referee: (Spain) Daniel Palencia Caballero

19 October 2024 10	Mirandés	1–0	Eibar	Miranda de Ebro
21:00 CET	Panichelli 26'; Víctor Parada (yellow card) 44'; Urko Izeta (yellow card) 85'	Report	Chema (yellow card) 30'; Martín Merquelanz (yellow card) 73'; Anaitz Arbilla (yellow card) 79' (yellow-red card) 82'; Antonio Puertas (yellow card) 90+6'	Stadium: Anduva; Attendance: 3,770; Referee: (Spain) Andrés Fuentes Molina

22 October 2024 11	Real Oviedo	4–1	Mirandés	Oviedo
19:00 CET	Alemão 41'; Hassan 45+3' (yellow card) 90+5'; Álex Cardero 73'; Paraschiv 82'	Report	Raúl Fernández (yellow card) 36'; Pablo Tomeo 86'; Julio Alonso (yellow card) 89'; Joel Roca (yellow card) 90+5'	Stadium: Estadio Carlos Tartiere; Attendance: 16,275; Referee: (Spain) Álvaro Moreno Aragón

26 October 2024 12	Mirandés	3–1	FC Cartagena	Miranda de Ebro
16:15 CET	Urko Izeta 11'; Panichelli 26' 61'	Report	Martín Aguirregabiria 64'; Pedro Alcalá (yellow card) 90+5'	Stadium: Anduva; Attendance: 2,700; Referee: (Spain) Miguel González Díaz

3 November 2024 13	Tenerife	1–0	Mirandés	Santa Cruz de Tenerife
18:30 CET	Rubén Alves 29'; Diarra (yellow card) 90+6'	Report	Hugo Rincón (yellow card) 6'; Lachuer (yellow card) 32'; Unai Egiluz (yellow card) 55'; Alberto Dadie (red card) 90+7'	Stadium: Estadio Heliodoro Rodríguez López; Attendance: 14,800; Referee: (Spain) Rubén Ávalos Barrera

9 November 2024 14	Mirandés	2–2	Cádiz	Miranda de Ebro
16:15 CET	Jon Gorrotxategi 4' 60'; Pablo Tomeo (yellow card) 45+1'	Report	Joseba Zaldúa (yellow card) 34'; Javi Ontiveros 42' 67'; Víctor Chust (yellow card) 45'; Roger (yellow card) 45+2'	Stadium: Anduva; Attendance: 3,241; Referee: (Spain) Carlos Muñiz Muñoz

16 November 2024 15	Castellón	1–3	Mirandés	Castellón de la Plana
16:15 CET	Josep Calavera (red card) 45+3'; Alberto Jiménez (yellow card) 45+4'; Chirino (yellow card) 46'; Raúl Sánchez 90'	Report	Panichelli 20' 24'; Urko Izeta 29' (yellow card) 51'	Stadium: Estadio Skyfi Castalia; Attendance: 10,987; Referee: (Spain) José Luis Guzmán Mansilla

24 November 2024 16	Mirandés	1–0	Eldense	Miranda de Ebro
16:15 CET	Julio Alonso (yellow card) 29'; Luis López (yellow card) 49'; Tachi (yellow card) 64'; Alberto Reina 71'	Report	Joel Jorquera (yellow card) 17'; Íñigo Piña (yellow card) 90+3'	Stadium: Anduva; Attendance: 3,372; Referee: (Spain) Marta Huerta de Aza

30 November 2024 17	Racing de Santander	0–1	Mirandés	Santander
18:30 CET	Michelin (yellow card) 55'; Gueye (yellow card) 84'	Report	Víctor Parada (yellow card) 34'; Tachi (yellow card) 63' (yellow-red card) 76'; Jon Gorrotxategi (yellow card) 73'; Alberto Reina 89'	Stadium: Campos de Sport de El Sardinero; Attendance: 21,022; Referee: (Spain) Sergiu Claudiu Muresan

6 December 2024 18	Mirandés	2–1	Levante	Miranda de Ebro
20:30 CET	Lachuer (yellow card) 44'; Hugo Rincón (yellow card) 66'; Juan Gutiérrez (yellow card) 85'; Joel Roca 87'; Panichelli 90+3'	Report	Ángel Algobia (yellow card) 5'; Andrés García 56'; Carlos Álvarez (yellow card) 64'; Adrián de la Fuente (yellow card) 83'	Stadium: Anduva; Attendance: 3,484; Referee: (Spain) Dámaso Arcediano Monescillo

13 December 2024 19	Almería	1–0	Mirandés	Almería
20:30 CET	Léo Baptistão 7'; Chumi (yellow card) 13'; Marc Pubill (yellow card) 25'; Lopy (yellow card) 50'; Sergio Arribas (yellow card) 67'; Gonzalo Melero (yellow card) 71'; Suárez (yellow card) 90+4'	Report	Hugo Rincón (yellow card) 29'; Alberto Reina (yellow card) 72'	Stadium: UD Almería Stadium; Attendance: 13,500; Referee: (Spain) Saúl Ais Reig

18 December 2024 20	Mirandés	1–1	Sporting Gijón	Miranda de Ebro
21:15 CET	Lachuer 27' (pen.)	Report	Maraš (yellow card) 62'; Róber Pier (yellow card) 72' (goal) 80'; Jonathan Dubasin (yellow card) 90+6'	Stadium: Anduva; Attendance: 3,291; Referee: (Spain) Álvaro Moreno Aragón

=== Copa del Rey ===
30 October 2024 First Round	Sant Andreu	2-1	Mirandes	Barcelona
20:00 CET	Emilio Lucas 14'; Antonio Pelegrín (yellow card) 29'; Marcos Gorriti (yellow card) 43'; Toni Paredes 66'; Marc Jurado (yellow card) 73'; Pau Darbra (yellow card) 87'	Report	Homenchenko 25' (pen.) (yellow card) 90+4'; Julio Alonso (yellow card) 43'; Bassinga (yellow card) 57'	Stadium: Camp Municipal Narcís Sala; Attendance: 5,139; Referee: (Spain) Rafael Sánchez López
