= Nico Toca =

Spanish footballer (born 2003)

Personal information
- Full name: Nicolás Toca Diego
- Date of birth: 18 March 2003 (age 23)
- Place of birth: Santander, Spain
- Height: 1.90 m (6 ft 3 in)
- Position: Midfielder

Youth career
- Peña Paco Liaño
- Bansander
- 2021–2022: Cultural Leonesa

Senior career*
Years	Team	Apps	(Gls)
2022–2026	Júpiter Leonés	35	(1)
2023–2026	Cultural Leonesa	8	(0)
2024–2025	→ Gimnástica Torrelavega (loan)	21	(1)
- * Club domestic league appearances and goals as of 15 February 2026

Nicolás "Nico" Toca Diego (born 18 March 2003) is a Spanish professional footballer who plays as a midfielder.

== Career ==
Born in Santander, Cantabria, Toca began his career with local side Peña Paco Liaño, and joined Cultural y Deportiva Leonesa's youth sides in 2021, from Club Bansander. He was promoted to farm team Júpiter Leonés in Tercera Federación ahead of the 2022–23 season, where he scored once in 19 appearances.

On 1 September 2023, Toca was promoted to Cultu's main squad in Primera Federación, and renewed his contract until 2026 five days later. He first appeared with the main squad on 8 October, after coming on as a late substitute for Bicho in a 2–1 home win over CF Rayo Majadahonda.

On 4 July 2024, after featuring rarely, Toca was loaned to Segunda Federación side Gimnástica de Torrelavega, for one year. Upon returning, he appeared in the pre-season with the main squad now in Segunda División, and made his professional debut on 24 August 2025, replacing injured Matía Barzic in a 1–0 home loss to UD Almería.

== Personal life ==
Toca comes from a family of amateur footballers: his father played at CA Perines as a youth before playing for CD Guarnizo as a senior, while his brothers also played for Guarnizo.
