= Hugo Rincón =

Spanish footballer

Personal information
- Full name: Hugo Rincón Lumbreras
- Date of birth: 27 January 2003 (age 23)
- Place of birth: Valtierra, Spain
- Height: 1.83 m (6 ft 0 in)
- Position: Right-back

Team information
- Current team: Athletic Bilbao
- Number: 15

Youth career
- Osasuna
- 2018–2021: Athletic Bilbao

Senior career*
Years	Team	Apps	(Gls)
2021–2025	Bilbao Athletic	60	(3)
2021–2022	Basconia	33	(1)
2024–2025	→ Mirandés (loan)	39	(2)
2025–	Athletic Bilbao	5	(0)
2025–2026	→ Girona (loan)	33	(1)

International career
2018	Spain U16		
2025–	Basque Country	1	(0)
- * Club domestic league appearances and goals as of 25 October 2026

Hugo Rincón Lumbreras (born 27 January 2003) is a Spanish footballer who plays as a right-back for La Liga club Athletic Bilbao.

== Club career ==
Born in Valtierra, Navarre, Rincón began his career in the CA Osasuna youth system before joining Athletic Bilbao in 2018 at the age of 15, becoming the latest in a long list of players to make the switch from Pamplona to Biscay (the most recent involving another right back from the same district, Jesús Areso, one year earlier). He made his senior debut with the club's third-tier reserve team Bilbao Athletic in May 2021 in a Segunda División B fixture against CD Tudelano in which he conceded an early penalty but otherwise put in a strong display. He made six more appearances for them in the following season, but spent most of the campaign with CD Basconia, the club's fifth-tier farm team.

With the departure of the older Álvaro Núñez in the summer of 2022 (Areso had returned to Osasuna a year earlier), Rincón was installed as a regular for Bilbao Athletic in the 2022–23 Primera Federación season, missing only one of the first 24 matches (due to a suspension following a red card) until he was injured against FC Barcelona Atlètic on 18 February 2023, missing several weeks of action as the young squad struggled against relegation. Despite this setback, due to his good performances and the uncertainty surrounding the future of the four more experienced men in his position (Óscar de Marcos, Iñigo Lekue, Ander Capa and Álex Petxarroman), it was reported in the local media that he would still take part in the next pre-season with the senior squad. He had returned to full fitness by May 2023.

During the 2023–24 season, Rincón was named among the substitutes in 11 La Liga matches for Athletic but did not make his debut; instead he appeared 25 times for Bilbao Athletic, captaining the side as they bounced back to the third tier immediately by winning their Segunda Federación group, losing only twice. On 6 August 2024, he renewed his contract with the Lions until 2028, and was loaned to Segunda División side CD Mirandés five days later.

After a strong season with Mirandés (alongside fellow loanees Urko Izeta and Unai Egiluz) in which they challenged for promotion to the top division (losing out in the play-off final), he returned to Athletic Bilbao for the 2025–26 pre-season, but with Jesús Areso having re-signed to play in the same position, Rincón was loaned to fellow La Liga side Girona on 29 July 2025. He featured regularly during the campaign – half of his 33 appearances coming as a substitute – and scored once, in a 3–0 victory against his parent club at Estadi Montilivi, as the Catalans suffered relegation on the final day.

Rincón was confirmed as a senior squad member for the 2026–27 Athletic Bilbao season, being assigned jersey number 15 vacated by the retired Iñigo Lekue; he made his Liga debut for the club at San Mamés (having already played there for Girona) on 22 August 2026, coming off the bench as Athletic lost 3–1 to Sevilla FC.

== International career ==
Rincón was called up to the Basque Country national team for a friendly match against Palestine on 15 November 2025.

== Personal life ==
His cousin Pablo Ibáñez is also a footballer.

== Career statistics ==
As of match played 25 October 2026

Appearances and goals by club, season and competition
Club	Season	League			Cup		Europe		Other		Total	
Club	Season	Division	Apps	Goals	Apps	Goals	Apps	Goals	Apps	Goals	Apps	Goals
Bilbao Athletic	2020–21	Segunda División B	1	0	—		—		—		1	0
Bilbao Athletic	2021–22	Primera Federación	6	0	—		—		—		6	0
Bilbao Athletic	2022–23	Primera Federación	29	0	—		—		—		29	0
Bilbao Athletic	2023–24	Segunda Federación	25	3	—		—		—		25	3
Bilbao Athletic	Total		61	3	—		—		0	0	61	3
Basconia	2021–22	Tercera Federación	33	1	—		—		—		33	1
Mirandés (loan)	2024–25	Segunda División	39	2	1	0	—		4 (Note: Appearances in Segunda División play-offs)	1	44	3
Athletic Bilbao	2025–26	La Liga	0	0	0	0	0	0	0	0	0	0
Athletic Bilbao	2026–27	La Liga	5	0	0	0	—		—		5	0
Athletic Bilbao	Total		5	0	0	0	0	0	0	0	5	0
Girona (loan)	2025–26	La Liga	33	1	2	0	—		—		35	1
Career total			171	7	3	0	0	0	4	1	178	8

== Honours ==
Bilbao Athletic

- Segunda Federación (Group 2): 2023–24
