= Pablo Tomeo =

Spanish footballer

Personal information
- Full name: Pablo Tomeo Félez
- Date of birth: 23 January 2000 (age 26)
- Place of birth: Alloza, Spain
- Height: 1.86 m (6 ft 1 in)
- Positions: Centre-back; midfielder

Team information
- Current team: Valladolid
- Number: 15

Youth career
- 2008–2017: Andorra
- 2018–2019: Huesca

Senior career*
Years	Team	Apps	(Gls)
2017–2018	Andorra	25	(0)
2019–2022	Huesca B	66	(2)
2022–2023	Huesca	19	(0)
2023–2025	Mirandés	69	(5)
2025–	Valladolid	36	(1)
- * Club domestic league appearances and goals as of 9 June 2026

Pablo Tomeo Félez (born 23 January 2000) is a Spanish professional footballer who plays as either a centre-back or a midfielder for Real Valladolid.

== Career ==
Born in Alloza, Province of Teruel, Aragon, Tomeo was an Andorra CF youth graduate, and made his senior debut during the 2016–17 campaign, as his side suffered relegation from Tercera División. In 2018, he moved to SD Huesca and returned to youth football.

Tomeo first appeared with Huesca's reserves during the 2019–20 campaign, helping in their promotion to the fourth tier after 42 years, and being a regular starter in their second consecutive promotion, to the newly-formed Segunda División RFEF. He made his first team debut on 12 August 2022, starting in a 0–0 Segunda División away draw against Levante UD.

On 26 June 2023, Tomeo moved to fellow second division side CD Mirandés on a two-year deal, following the expiration of his contract with Huesca. He scored his first professional goal on 17 May of the following year, netting the opener in a 1–1 home draw against Elche CF.

Tomeo became an undisputed starter for the Jabatos during the 2024–25 season, being converted to a centre-back by manager Alessio Lisci and scoring four goals in 45 appearances overall. On 16 July 2025, he signed a two-year deal with Real Valladolid also in the second division.
