= Unai Egiluz =

Spanish footballer (born 2002)

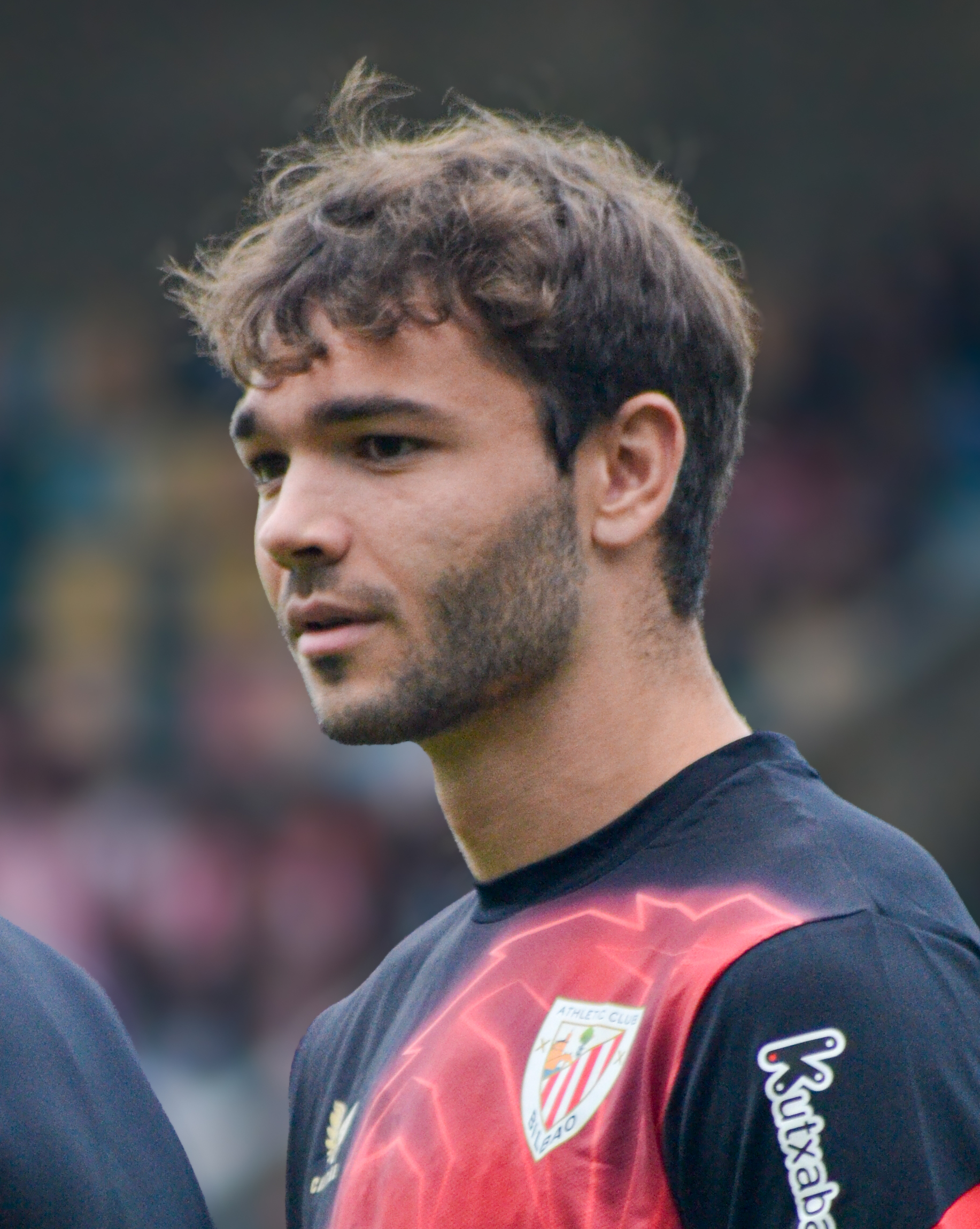
- Egiluz with Athletic Bilbao in 2024

Personal information
- Full name: Unai Egiluz Arroyo
- Date of birth: 19 March 2002 (age 24)
- Place of birth: Durango, Spain
- Height: 1.86 m (6 ft 1 in)
- Position: Centre-back

Team information
- Current team: Athletic Bilbao

Youth career
- Durango
- 2018–2021: Athletic Bilbao

Senior career*
Years	Team	Apps	(Gls)
2021–2022	Basconia	23	(0)
2022–2024	Bilbao Athletic	50	(0)
2024–	Athletic Bilbao	0	(0)
2024–2025	→ Mirandés (loan)	28	(0)
- * Club domestic league appearances and goals as of 2 June 2025

Unai Egiluz Arroyo (born 19 March 2002) is a Spanish footballer who plays as a centre-back for Athletic Bilbao.

== Career ==
Born in Durango, Biscay, Basque Country, Egiluz joined Athletic Bilbao's Lezama youth academy in 2018, from hometown side SCD Durango. He made his senior debut with the farm team CD Basconia on 5 September 2021, starting in a 0–0 Tercera División RFEF away draw against Barakaldo CF.

Egiluz was promoted to the reserves on 10 July 2022, and made his first appearance for the side on 28 August by coming on as a late substitute in a 2–1 Primera Federación home loss against CF La Nucía. In the summer of 2023, he was one of the players chosen to do the pre-season with the senior squad.

Egiluz made his first tema debut for the Lions on 1 November 2023, starting in a 2–1 away win over UE Rubí, for the season's Copa del Rey. He remained a starter for the B's during the campaign, as they achieved promotion from Segunda Federación.

On 29 August 2024, Egiluz was loaned to Segunda División side CD Mirandés for one year, becoming the third Athletic player to do so in the transfer window. He made his professional debut on 15 September, replacing Tachi at half-time in a 2–0 home win over Albacete Balompié.

Egiluz contributed with 33 appearances overall during the campaign, as the Jabatos narrowly missed out promotion in the play-offs. On returning to Athletic, he renewed his contract until 2028 on 9 July 2025 and was definitely included in the main squad, but suffered a serious anterior cruciate ligament injury shortly after.

== Honours ==
Bilbao Athletic

- Segunda Federación (Group 2): 2023–24
