= Rubén Quintanilla =

Spanish footballer

Personal information
- Full name: Rubén Quintanilla Rodríguez
- Date of birth: 3 April 2002 (age 24)
- Place of birth: Barcelona, Spain
- Height: 1.80 m (5 ft 11 in)
- Position: Midfielder

Team information
- Current team: Rayo Majadahonda

Youth career
- Damm
- 2020–2021: Mallorca

Senior career*
Years	Team	Apps	(Gls)
2021–2024	Mallorca B	50	(1)
2021–2022	→ Granollers (loan)	29	(0)
2023–2024	Mallorca	1	(0)
2024	Almería B	3	(0)
2024–2026	Almería	4	(0)
2025	→ Burgos (loan)	8	(0)
2025–2026	→ Eldense (loan)	9	(0)
2026–	Rayo Majadahonda	0	(0)
- * Club domestic league appearances and goals as of 10 June 2026

Rubén Quintanilla Rodríguez (born 3 April 2002) is a Spanish professional footballer who plays as a midfielder for CF Rayo Majadahonda.

== Career ==
Born in Barcelona, Catalonia, Quintanilla joined RCD Mallorca's youth setup in 2020, from CF Damm. On 11 September 2021, after finishing his formation, he was loaned to Tercera División RFEF side EC Granollers, for one year.

A regular starter at the club, Quintanilla returned to the Bermellones in July 2022, and was assigned to the reserves in Segunda Federación. He made his first team – and La Liga – debut on 28 May 2023, coming on as a late substitute for Jaume Costa in a 3–0 away loss to FC Barcelona.

On 5 July 2023, Quintanilla signed a new one-year deal with Mallorca, with an option for a further two seasons. On 23 July of the following year, after helping the B's in their promotion to Segunda Federación, he moved to another reserve team, UD Almería B also promoted to the fourth tier.

On 2 February 2025, after already featuring with the first team in Segunda División, Quintanilla renewed his contract with the Andalusians until 2027, and was immediately loaned to fellow second division side Burgos CF. On 14 August, he moved to Primera Federación side CD Eldense also in a temporary deal.

On 9 July 2026, Quintanilla was announced at CF Rayo Majadahonda also in division three.
