= Joaquín Panichelli =

Argentine footballer

- Panichelli in 2023

Personal information
- Date of birth: 7 October 2002 (age 24)
- Place of birth: Córdoba, Argentina
- Height: 1.90 m (6 ft 3 in)
- Position: Forward

Team information
- Current team: Strasbourg
- Number: 9

Youth career
- Racing de Córdoba
- Belgrano
- Atalaya de Córdoba
- 2020–2022: River Plate

Senior career*
Years	Team	Apps	(Gls)
2023	Alavés B	6	(1)
2023–2025	Alavés	10	(0)
2024–2025	→ Mirandés (loan)	40	(20)
2025–	Strasbourg	27	(16)

International career^{‡}
2025–	Argentina	1	(0)
- * Club domestic league appearances and goals as of 00:49, 22 March 2026 (UTC) ‡ National team caps and goals as of 14 November 2025

Joaquín Panichelli (Italian: [paniˈkɛlli]; born 7 October 2002) is an Argentine professional footballer who plays as a forward for Ligue 1 club Strasbourg and the Argentina national team.

== Club career ==
=== Early career ===
Born in Córdoba, Panichelli began his career with local side Racing de Córdoba, and subsequently represented Belgrano and Atalaya de Córdoba also in his hometown. In February 2020, after a failed trial at Boca Juniors, he signed for River Plate.

=== Playing in Spain ===
On 13 January 2023, Panichelli moved abroad and signed a three-and-a-half-year contract with Spanish Segunda División side Deportivo Alavés, being initially assigned to the reserves in Segunda Federación. He made his professional first team debut on 5 May, coming on as a late substitute for Miguel de la Fuente in a 1–1 home draw against Granada CF.

After suffering a knee injury, Panichelli made his La Liga debut on 3 February 2024, replacing Samu Omorodion late into a 3–1 home loss against FC Barcelona.

On 19 August 2024, Panichelli moved to CD Mirandés in the Segunda División on loan for the 2024–25 season. On his club debut on 24 August 2024, Panichelli scored the opener in a 1–1 away draw against Málaga CF, which was also his first professional goal. He ended the season with 21 goals overall, being the club's top scorer as they almost missed out promotion in the play-offs.

=== Strasbourg ===
On 27 July 2025, Panichelli joined French club Strasbourg. A month later, on 17 August, he scored a goal on his debut in a 1–0 away win over Metz. In March 2026, he suffered his second ACL injury in two years during an international training session, ruling him out for the remainder of the season after he had already established himself as his club's top scorer with 16 goals in Ligue 1. In his debut season, he was voted the club's Player of the Season.

== International career ==
On 15 November 2025, Panichelli debuted for the Argentina national team in a 2–0 friendly victory against Angola.

== Personal life ==
Panichelli's father Germán was also a footballer and a forward.

== Career statistics ==
=== Club ===
As of match played 22 March 2026

Appearances and goals by club, season and competition
Club	Season	League			National cup (Note: Includes Coupe de France)		Europe		Other		Total	
Club	Season	Division	Apps	Goals	Apps	Goals	Apps	Goals	Apps	Goals	Apps	Goals
Alavés B	2022–23	Segunda Federación	6	1	—		—		1 (Note: Appearance in Segunda Federación promotion play-offs)	1	7	2
Alavés	2022–23	Segunda División	2	0	0	0	—		2 (Note: Appearances in Segunda División promotion play-offs)	0	4	0
Alavés	2023–24	La Liga	8	0	0	0	—		—		8	0
Alavés	Total		10	0	0	0	—		2	0	12	0
Mirandés (loan)	2024–25	Segunda División	40	20	0	0	—		4	1	44	21
Strasbourg	2025–26	Ligue 1	27	16	4	2	8 (Note: Appearances in UEFA Conference League)	2	—		39	20
Career total			83	37	4	2	8	2	7	2	102	43

=== International ===
As of match played 14 November 2025

Appearances and goals by national team and year
National team	Year	Apps	Goals
Argentina	2025	1	0
Total		1	0
