= Urko Izeta =

Spanish footballer (born 1999)

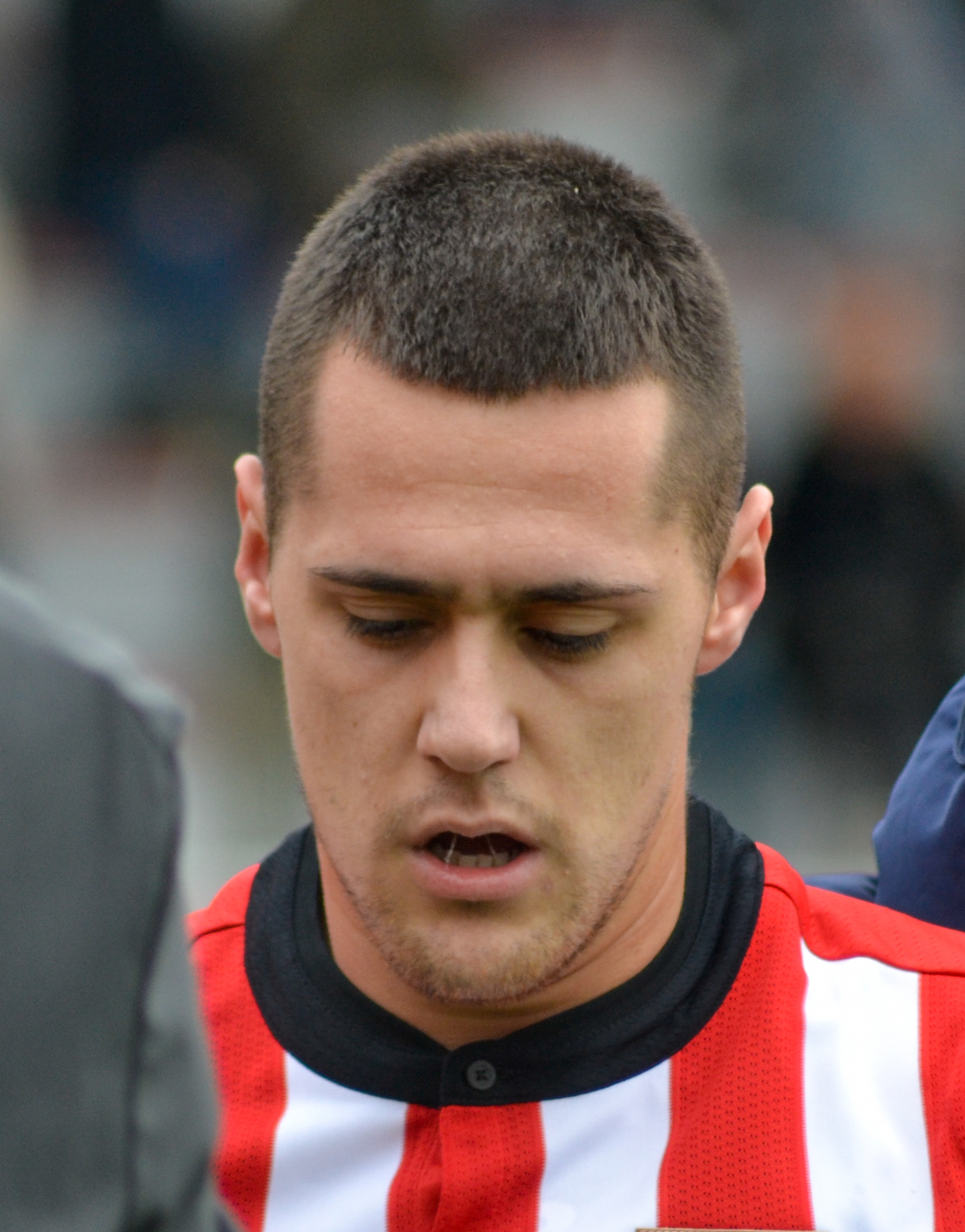
- Izeta in 2023

Personal information
- Full name: Urko Iruretagoiena Lertxundi
- Date of birth: 29 September 1999 (age 27)
- Place of birth: Aia, Spain
- Height: 1.75 m (5 ft 9 in)
- Position: Striker

Team information
- Current team: Cádiz

Youth career
- Ostadar
- Zarautz
- 2016–2017: Eibar

Senior career*
Years	Team	Apps	(Gls)
2017–2018	Eibar Urko	27	(24)
2018–2023	Vitoria	68	(9)
2021–2022	→ Arenas Getxo (loan)	32	(17)
2022–2023	→ Amorebieta (loan)	18	(6)
2023–2025	Bilbao Athletic	52	(25)
2024–2025	→ Mirandés (loan)	40	(12)
2025–2026	Athletic Bilbao	13	(1)
2026–	Cádiz	0	(0)

International career^{‡}
2025–	Basque Country	1	(1)
- * Club domestic league appearances and goals as of 27 May 2026 ‡ National team caps and goals as of 15 November 2025

Urko Iruretagoiena Lertxundi (born 29 September 1999), known as Urko Izeta or just Izeta, is a Spanish professional footballer who plays as a striker for Cádiz CF.

== Career ==
Born in Aia, Gipuzkoa, Basque Country, Izeta joined SD Eibar's youth sides in 2016, after representing Zarautz KE and Ostadar SKT. After making his senior debut with the club's second reserve team SD Eibar Urko during the 2017–18 season, he was promoted to farm team CD Vitoria in 2018.

On 24 February 2020, Izeta renewed his contract with the Armeros until 2022. On 1 September of the following year, he was loaned to Segunda División RFEF side Arenas Club de Getxo, for one year.

Izeta scored 19 goals overall for Arenas during the campaign, as the club missed out promotion in the play-offs. On 18 July 2022, he further extended his link with Eibar until 2024, being immediately loaned to Primera Federación side SD Amorebieta for the season.

On 19 January 2023, Izeta's loan to Amore was terminated as he was transferred to Athletic Bilbao; he signed two-and-a-half-year deal and was initially assigned to the B-team. Unable to prevent relegation in his first campaign, he scored a career-best 21 goals in his second as the Cachorros returned to the third level after winning their group.

On 8 August 2024, Izeta was loaned to Segunda División side CD Mirandés for one year. He made his professional debut eight days later, starting and providing the assist on Alberto Reina's goal in a 1–0 home win over Córdoba CF.

Izeta scored his first professional goal on 15 September 2024, netting Mirandés' opener in a 2–0 home win over Albacete Balompié. He finished the season with 15 goals as they narrowly missed out promotion in the play-offs.

On 26 June 2025, Izeta returned to Athletic and renewed his contract until 2027, being assigned to the first team. He made his La Liga debut on 13 September, playing the last ten minutes of a 1–0 home loss to Deportivo Alavés, and scored his first goal in the category on 23 May 2025, but in a 4–2 loss at Real Madrid.

On 11 July 2026, Izeta signed a five-year deal with Cádiz CF back in the second division.

== Career statistics ==
As of match played 14 March 2026

Appearances and goals by club, season and competition
Club	Season	League			Cup		Europe		Other		Total	
Club	Season	Division	Apps	Goals	Apps	Goals	Apps	Goals	Apps	Goals	Apps	Goals
Eibar Urko	2017–18	Preferente de Guipúzcoa	27	24	—		—		—		27	24
Vitoria	2018–19	Segunda División B	25	1	—		—		—		25	1
Vitoria	2019–20	Tercera División	21	5	—		—		1 (Note: Appearance in Segunda División B play-offs)	0	22	5
Vitoria	2020–21	Tercera División	22	4	—		—		1 (Note: Appearance in Tercera División play-offs)	0	23	4
Vitoria	Total		68	10	—		—		2	0	70	10
Arenas Getxo (loan)	2021–22	Segunda Federación	32	17	—		—		3 (Note: One appearance in Copa Federación, two appearances and two goals in 2022 Segunda División RFEF play-offs)	2	35	19
Amorebieta (loan)	2022–23	Primera Federación	18	6	1	0	—		—		19	6
Bilbao Athletic	2022–23	Primera Federación	19	4	—		—		—		19	4
Bilbao Athletic	2023–24	Segunda Federación	33	21	—		—		—		33	21
Bilbao Athletic	Total		52	25	—		—		—		52	25
Mirandés (loan)	2024–25	Segunda División	40	12	0	0	—		4 (Note: Appearances in La Liga play-offs)	3	44	15
Athletic Bilbao	2025–26	La Liga	11	0	3	0	0	0	0	0	14	0
Career total			248	94	4	0	0	0	9	5	261	99

== Honours ==
Amorebieta

- Primera Federación: 2022–23 (Group 2 and overall champion)

Bilbao Athletic

- Segunda Federación: 2023–24 (Group 2)
