= Pudgy Penguins =

Consumer brand and IP franchise

Pudgy Penguins logo

Pudgy Penguins is a consumer brand and intellectual property franchise centred on a collection of penguin characters, with products spanning toys, merchandise, games and digital experiences. It originated as a collection of 8,888 non-fungible tokens (NFTs) launched in July 2021 and later expanded into physical consumer products and entertainment.

Following its acquisition in April 2022, the project expanded beyond digital collectibles into consumer products, retail, entertainment and experiential events, including toys, games, animation, publishing and other digital experiences.

== History ==
=== Launch and acquisition ===
Pudgy Penguins was created on 22 July 2021 as a digital art collection of 8,888 penguins. Ownership of each individual collectible was verified using blockchain technology.

In April 2022, the collection and its intellectual property were acquired for approximately US$2.5 million by Luca Netz, Peter Lobanov, Lorenzo Melendez, Vedant Mangaldas and Jennifer McGlone.

In April 2022, Igloo, Inc. was formed following the acquisition of the project and its intellectual property.

Following the acquisition, Pudgy Penguins expanded beyond its origins as a digital art collection into consumer products, entertainment and other forms of intellectual property.

=== Expansion into consumer products ===
Pudgy Penguins expanded into physical merchandise following its acquisition. In 2023, Pudgy Toys arrived at Walmart and Amazon, with products based on the Pudgy Penguins intellectual property.

The brand subsequently expanded its retail presence to other major retailers. In 2025, the brand also expanded its retail presence to Walgreens.

In July 2026, Pudgy Penguins plush products were available in more than 1,800 Target stores.

In September 2026, Pudgy Penguins introduced its first lifestyle test through a stationery and desk collection sold directly to consumers.

The development of physical products formed part of a broader expansion of Pudgy Penguins from a digital collectible project into a character-driven consumer-products and entertainment brand.

=== PENGU ===
In December 2024, Pudgy Penguins launched PENGU, a token associated with the Pudgy Penguins ecosystem.

The token forms part of the project's digital-asset ecosystem alongside its original digital collectibles.

=== PudgyWorld ===
PudgyWorld is a game associated with the Pudgy Penguins brand.

The game is set within The Berg, the fictional world in which the Pudgy Penguins characters live. PudgyWorld is distinct from The Berg and should not be used as the name of the fictional world.

The Pudgy Penguins community is known as The Huddle.

The Pudgy Penguins Huddle Characters

=== Games ===
Pudgy Penguins has developed digital games and interactive experiences based on its intellectual property.

Pudgy Party is a mobile game associated with the franchise and formed part of the brand's expansion into digital entertainment.

PudgyWorld is the name of the Pudgy Penguins game and is distinct from The Berg, the fictional world in which the characters live.

=== Animation and publishing ===
Pudgy Penguins has expanded into animation and publishing alongside its physical products and digital experiences.

In 2025, the franchise expanded into animated content through a YouTube series based on the Pudgy Penguins intellectual property.

The franchise also expanded into publishing. In 2025, Pudgy Penguins released its first book with Penguin Random House.

The franchise's publishing and storytelling activities also include a comic centred on characters from the Pudgy Penguins universe.

== Products and intellectual property ==
Pudgy Penguins began as a digital art collection but subsequently expanded into a broader intellectual property franchise.

Its products and experiences have included non-fungible tokens, plush toys, figurines, stationery and other lifestyle products, games, animation, books and comics.

The physical products are based on characters and artwork associated with the Pudgy Penguins intellectual property. The brand has also developed licensing and commercial opportunities around its characters and digital assets.

== Characters ==
The Pudgy Penguins franchise is centred on recurring penguin characters, including Pax Pengu and Polly.

Pax and Polly

Pax Pengu is also referred to as Pax, Pengu and Paxton. "Pengu" originated as a nickname used by the Pudgy Penguins community.

Pax Pengu and Polly are presented as a couple and are central characters within the Pudgy Penguins universe.

The characters live in The Berg, the fictional setting associated with the franchise. Beverly Chills is a location within The Berg and is where Polly was born.

== Corporate ownership ==
Igloo, Inc. is the parent company of Pudgy Penguins, with Pudgy Penguins operating as its subsidiary.

Luca Netz serves as chief executive officer and has overseen the development of Pudgy Penguins following its acquisition in 2022.

Other members of the company's leadership include Peter Lobanov, Lorenzo Melendez, Vedant Mangaldas and Jennifer McGlone.

== Related collections and projects ==
Pudgy Penguins has developed several related collections and projects as its intellectual property has expanded beyond the original collection.

These include Lil Pudgys, PudgyWorld, the franchise's game and digital experience, and PENGU, its associated token.

The original Pudgy Penguins collection, its associated characters, consumer products and digital experiences form part of the wider Pudgy Penguins intellectual property.
