= Rachad Fettal =

Moroccan footballer (born 2005)

Personal information
- Full name: Rachad Fettal Dhimi
- Date of birth: 16 January 2005 (age 21)
- Place of birth: Torre-Pacheco, Spain
- Height: 1.84 m (6 ft 0 in)
- Position: Forward

Team information
- Current team: Real Madrid B
- Number: 9

Youth career
- 2016–2017: UCAM Murcia
- 2017–2019: Real Murcia
- 2019–2020: EF Torre Pacheco
- 2020–2023: Almería

Senior career*
Years	Team	Apps	(Gls)
2022–2024	Almería B	37	(15)
2024–2025	Almería	16	(1)
2025–	Real Madrid B	10	(3)

International career^{‡}
2023	Spain U18	3	(2)
2023–2024	Morocco U20	7	(2)
2025–	Spain U20	1	(0)
- * Club domestic league appearances and goals as of 8 September 2026 ‡ National team caps and goals as of 4 September 2025

Rachad Fettal Dhimi (Arabic: رشاد فتال الدهيمي; born 16 January 2005), sometimes known as just Rachad, is a professional footballer who plays as a forward for La Liga club Real Madrid.

== Club career ==
=== Almería ===
Born in Torre-Pacheco, Region of Murcia, Rachad joined UD Almería's youth setup in 2020, after representing UCAM Murcia CF and EF Torre Pacheco. He made his senior debut with the reserves at the age of 16 on 31 October 2021, coming on as a late substitute in a 1–0 Tercera División RFEF home win over CD Huétor Vega.

On 30 April 2022, Rachad signed a three-year contract with the Rojiblancos, with an option for a further two years. He was regularly used in the Juvenil squad during the 2022–23 season, helping the side to reach the finals of the Copa del Rey Juvenil and being the top scorer of the competition with five goals as they lost the final to Real Madrid.

Definitely promoted to the B-team for the 2023–24 campaign, Rachad scored his first senior goal on 1 October 2023, netting the equalizer in a 4–1 home loss to Juventud de Torremolinos CF. He made his first team – and La Liga – debut with the club on 3 December, replacing Largie Ramazani in a 0–0 Laliga home draw against Real Betis.

Ahead of the 2024–25 Segunda División, Rachad became a permanent member of the main squad, and scored his first professional goal on 22 September 2024, netting the equalizer in a 2–2 home draw against SD Eibar. In January 2025, however, he suffered a knee injury, being sidelined for three months.

=== Real Madrid ===
On 11 July 2025, Almería announced the transfer of Rachad to Real Madrid. He joined the club on a three-year contract, being initially assigned to Real Madrid Castilla in Primera Federación.

== International career ==
Born in Spain, Rachad is of Moroccan descent. He was called up to the Spain national under-18 team in January and April 2023, scoring twice in three matches.

On 30 August 2023, Rachad was called up to a training camp with the under-19s, but opted to represent Morocco in the following day after receiving a call up from their under-20 team. He was a part of the Morocco under-20 squad at the UNAF U-20 Tournament. Rachad eventually chose to represent Spain once more in September 2025.
