= Matía Barzic =

Spanish footballer (born 2004)

Personal information
- Full name: Matía Barzic Gutiérrez
- Date of birth: 31 May 2004 (age 22)
- Place of birth: Madrid, Spain
- Height: 1.90 m (6 ft 3 in)
- Position: Centre-back

Team information
- Current team: Elche

Youth career
- 2012–2023: Atlético Madrid

Senior career*
Years	Team	Apps	(Gls)
2023–2025	Elche B	38	(3)
2024–	Elche	8	(0)
2025	→ Eldense (loan)	14	(0)
2025–2026	→ Cultural Leonesa (loan)	34	(2)

International career^{‡}
2024–	Croatia U21	1	(0)
- * Club domestic league appearances and goals as of 31 May 2026 ‡ National team caps and goals as of 15 October 2024

Matía Barzic Gutiérrez (Croatian: Barzić; born 31 May 2004) is a professional footballer who plays as a centre-back for Spanish club Elche CF. Born in Spain, he represents Croatia internationally.

== Club career ==
Born in Madrid to a Croatian father Mate Barzić and a Spanish mother Paloma Gutiérrez, Barzic was an Atlético Madrid youth graduate. On 19 July 2023, after finishing his formation, he signed for Elche CF and was assigned to the reserves in Tercera Federación.

Barzic made his senior debut on 10 September 2023, starting in a 2–0 away win over CF Gandía, and scored his first goal six days later by netting the winner in a 1–0 home success over FC Jove Español San Vicente. He was an undisputed starter for the B's during the campaign, scoring twice in 33 appearances as they achieved promotion to Segunda Federación.

Barzic made his first team debut with the Franjiverdes on 18 August 2024, starting in a 1–0 Segunda División home loss to SD Huesca. The following 26 January, he joined fellow second division side CD Eldense on loan until the end of the season.

On 15 August 2025, Barzic moved to Cultural y Deportiva Leonesa also in the second division on a one-year loan deal. Upon returning, he renewed his contract until 2030 on 14 August 2026.

== International career ==
On 24 September 2024, Barzic was called up to the Croatia national under-21 team.
