= Jaime Vázquez =

Spanish footballer (born 2006)

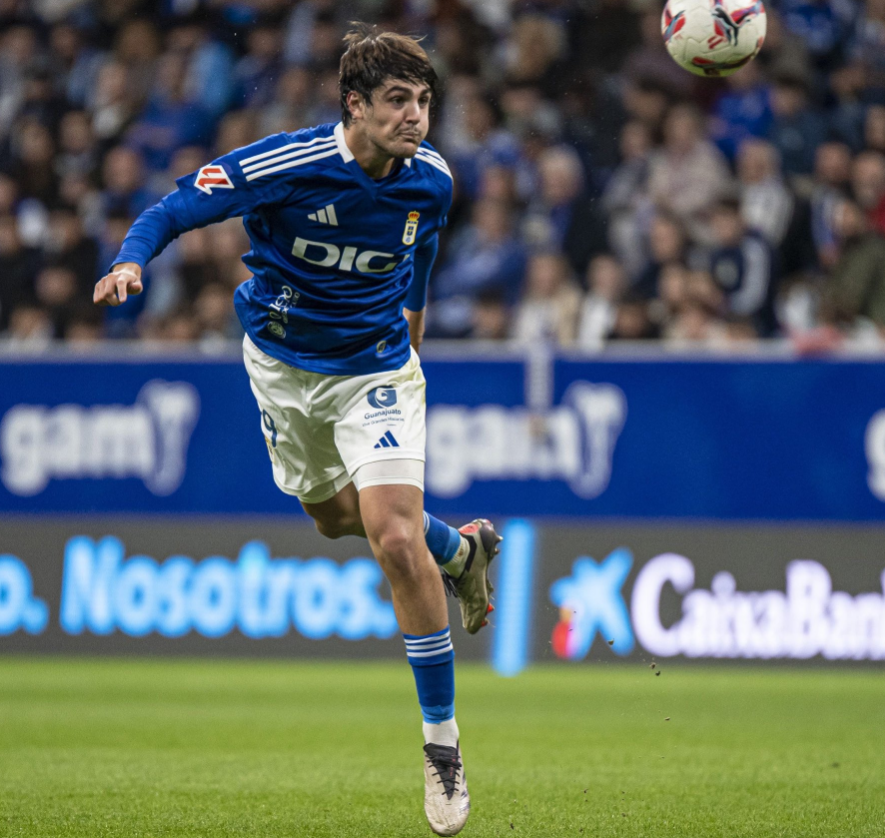
- Vázquez playing for Oviedo in 2024

Personal information
- Full name: Jaime Vázquez Cuervo-Arango
- Date of birth: 1 February 2006 (age 20)
- Place of birth: Avilés, Spain
- Height: 1.84 m (6 ft 0 in)
- Position: Centre-back

Team information
- Current team: Cultural Leonesa

Youth career
- Quirinal
- 2014–2021: Sporting Gijón
- 2021–2023: Real Madrid

Senior career*
Years	Team	Apps	(Gls)
2023–2025	Oviedo B	37	(1)
2024–2026	Oviedo	6	(0)
2025–2026	→ Celta B (loan)	26	(0)
2026–	Cultural Leonesa	0	(0)

International career^{‡}
2024	Spain U18	2	(0)
- * Club domestic league appearances and goals as of 25 May 2026 ‡ National team caps and goals as of 26 April 2024

Jaime Vázquez Cuervo-Arango (born 1 February 2006) is a Spanish footballer who plays as a centre-back for Cultural y Deportiva Leonesa.

== Career ==
Born in Avilés, Asturias, Vázquez joined Sporting de Gijón's youth setup in 2014, from CD Quirinal. On 5 August 2021, after seven seasons at the Mareo facilities, he agreed to join Real Madrid's La Fábrica.

On 26 July 2023, Vázquez signed for Real Oviedo, initially for the Juvenil División de Honor squad. He made his senior debut with the reserves on 3 September, starting in a 3–1 Segunda Federación home loss to Racing Club Villalbés.

Vázquez scored his first senior goal on 18 November 2023, netting Vetusta's opener in a 1–1 home draw against Marino de Luanco. He made his first team debut the following 13 January, starting in a 1–1 home draw against SD Amorebieta in the Segunda División.

On 29 January 2025, Vázquez was loaned to Primera Federación side RC Celta Fortuna until June. His loan was extended for a further year, and he helped the side to achieve a first-ever promotion to the second division at the end of the season.

On 8 July 2026, Vázquez signed for Cultural y Deportiva Leonesa in division three.
