= 2024–25 Segunda División =

94th season of the second-tier football league in Spain

La Liga 2
- Season: 2024–25
- Dates: 15 August 2024 – 21 June 2025
- Champions: Levante (3rd title)
- Promoted: Levante; Elche; Oviedo
- Relegated: Eldense; Tenerife; Racing Ferrol; Cartagena
- Matches: 462
- Goals: 1,179 (2.55 per match)
- Top goalscorer: Luis Suárez (27 goals)
- Biggest home win: Racing Santander 6–0 Racing Ferrol (19 January 2025)
- Biggest away win: Cádiz 0–4 Zaragoza (16 August 2024); Cartagena 1–5 Deportivo La Coruña (2 November 2024); Racing Ferrol 1–5 Oviedo (8 December 2024); Deportivo La Coruña 0–4 Mirandés (22 December 2024); Deportivo La Coruña 0–4 Elche (1 June 2025)
- Highest scoring: Almería 2–5 Castellón (16 September 2024); Albacete 2–5 Deportivo La Coruña (27 September 2024); Cádiz 5–2 Cartagena (9 February 2025); Levante 5–2 Zaragoza (19 April 2025); Castellón 4–3 Sporting Gijón (5 May 2025)
- Longest winning run: Almería; Racing Santander (5 matches)
- Longest unbeaten run: Almería; Huesca (14 matches)
- Longest winless run: Cartagena (19 matches)
- Longest losing run: Cartagena (9 losses)
- Highest attendance: 29,418; Oviedo v Cádiz (1 June 2025)
- Lowest attendance: 1,708; Cartagena v Tenerife (17 May 2025)
- Attendance: 6,126,773 (13,261 per match)

The 2024–25 La Liga 2, also known as LALIGA HYPERMOTION due to sponsorship reasons, was the 94th season of the Segunda División since its establishment in Spain. It commenced on 15 August 2024 and it ended on 21 June 2025.

Málaga drew the highest average home league attendance with 24,857, followed by Deportivo La Coruña with 21,571, Sporting Gijón with 21,131, Oviedo with 20,673 and Racing Santander with 20,212.

== Teams ==
=== Team changes ===
Promoted from 2023–24 Primera Federación	Relegated from 2023–24 La Liga	Promoted to 2024–25 La Liga	Relegated to 2024–25 Primera Federación
Castellón; Deportivo La Coruña; Málaga; Córdoba	Almería; Granada; Cádiz	Valladolid; Leganés; Espanyol	Amorebieta; Alcorcón; Andorra; Villarreal B

This season was the first since 2006–07 season without any teams from Catalonia, as well as the first season without any teams from the Community of Madrid since 2007–08 season, and without any reserve teams since the 2020–21 season.

=== Promotion and relegation (pre-season) ===
A total of 22 teams will contest the league, including 15 sides from the 2023–24 season, three relegated from the 2023–24 La Liga, and four promoted from the 2023–24 Primera Federación.

Teams promoted to La Liga

On 26 May 2024, Real Valladolid became the first side to mathematically be promoted, assuring an immediate return to the top flight following 3–2 win against Villarreal B. The second team to earn promotion was Leganés, following 2–0 win against Elche on 2 June 2024, thus returning after a 4-season absence and also being promoted to the top flight for the second time in their history. The third team to be promoted was Espanyol, after beating Oviedo in the promotion play-off final, returning after a single-season absence.

Teams relegated from La Liga

The first team to be relegated from La Liga were Almería, after a 3–1 loss to Getafe on 27 April 2024, ending their two years stay in the top tier. The second team to be relegated was Granada, following Mallorca beat 1–0 against Las Palmas, ending their one-year stay in top tier. The third and final team relegated to Segunda was Cádiz, after a 0–0 draw against Las Palmas on 19 May 2024, ending their four-year stay in top tier.

Teams relegated to Primera Federación

The first two and three relegated team are Andorra, Alcorcón and Villarreal B after losing their respective matches On 26 May 2024. Alcorcón returned to the third division after one year. While Andorra and Villarreal B returned to the third division after two years stay in the second division. On 2 June 2024, Amorebieta became the last team to be relegated to the third division after only one season stay in the second division.

Teams promoted from Primera Federación

On 5 May 2024, Castellón became the first team to achieve promotion to the second tier after a 3–2 win against Real Murcia, securing direct promotion after three years in the third tier. The second team to earn promotion was Deportivo La Coruña following a win against Barcelona Atlètic on 12 May 2024, ending a four-season stint at the third division. On 22 June 2024, Málaga became the third team to secure promotion to Segunda División, returning after a one-year absence. On 23 June 2024, Córdoba became the final team promoted to Segunda División, returning after a 5-year absence.

=== Stadiums and locations ===
Location of teams in 2024–25 Segunda División
Location of teams in 2024–25 Segunda División (Canary Islands)

Team	Location	Stadium	Capacity
Albacete	Albacete	Estadio Carlos Belmonte	17,524
Almería	Almería	UD Almería Stadium	15,000
Burgos	Burgos	Estadio El Plantío	12,194
Cádiz	Cádiz	Estadio Nuevo Mirandilla	20,724
Cartagena	Cartagena	Estadio Cartagonova	15,105
Castellón	Castellón de la Plana	Estadio de Castalia	15,500
Córdoba	Córdoba	Estadio Nuevo Arcángel	20,989
Deportivo La Coruña	La Coruña	Estadio Riazor	32,660
Eibar	Eibar	Estadio Municipal de Ipurúa	8,164
Elche	Elche	Estadio Martínez Valero	31,388
Eldense	Elda	Estadio Pepico Amat	4,036
Granada	Granada	Estadio Nuevo Los Cármenes	19,189
Huesca	Huesca	Estadio El Alcoraz	9,100
Levante	Valencia	Estadio Ciutat de València	26,354
Málaga	Málaga	Estadio La Rosaleda	30,044
Mirandés	Miranda de Ebro	Estadio de Anduva	5,759
Real Oviedo	Oviedo	Estadio Carlos Tartiere	30,500
Racing Ferrol	Ferrol	Estadio de A Malata	12,043
Racing Santander	Santander	Campos de Sport de El Sardinero	22,222
Sporting Gijón	Gijón	Estadio El Molinón	29,371
Tenerife	Santa Cruz de Tenerife	Estadio Heliodoro Rodríguez López	22,824
Zaragoza	Zaragoza	Estadio de La Romareda	33,608

=== Personnel and sponsors ===
Team	Manager	Captain	Kit maker	Kit sponsors	
Team	Manager	Captain	Kit maker	Main	Other(s)
Albacete	(Spain) Alberto González	(Spain) Riki	Adidas	Globalcaja	List: Side: None; Back: Iner Energía; Sleeves: None; Shorts: Ven-Invest, En un lugar de tu vida
Almería	(Spain) Rubi	(Argentina) Lucas Robertone	Castore	DAZN	List: Side: None; Back: None; Sleeves: None; Shorts: Kudu
Burgos	(Spain) Luis Miguel Ramis	(Spain) Raúl Navarro	Adidas	Digi	List: Side: Burgos 2031 Renacimiento; Back: Beroil Energía; Sleeves: Cajaviva Caja Rural; Shorts: Hospital Recoletas Salud Burgos, VTBatteries Exide
Cádiz	(Spain) Gaizka Garitano	(Spain) Álex Fernández	Macron	Silbö Telecom	List: Side: Cádiz Turismo; Back: Cádiz Turismo, Hospitales Pascual; Sleeves: Wehumans; Shorts: Wehumans
Cartagena	(Spain) Guillermo Fernández Romo	(Spain) Pedro Alcalá	Macron	Avatel Telecom	List: Side: Caravaca de la Cruz 2024 - Año Jubilar; Back: Ribera Salud; Sleeves: Cartagena; Shorts: None
Castellón	(Netherlands) Johan Plat	(Spain) Salva Ruiz	Macron	None	List: Side: None; Back: Globeenergy; Sleeves: RepCar STILL; Shorts: Pudgy Penguins, Castellón Capital del Deporte
Córdoba	(Spain) Iván Ania	(Spain) Carlos Marín	Joma	None	List: Side: Córdoba, Patrimonio de la Humanidad; Back: Globalzia, Supermercados Piedra; Sleeves: Córdoba Provincia Infinita; Shorts: iFertility
Deportivo La Coruña	(Spain) Óscar Gilsanz	(Spain) Diego Villares	Kappa	Estrella Galicia 0,0	List: Side: None; Back: Abanca; Sleeves: Digi; Shorts: A Coruña, unha provincia por descubrir
Eibar	(Spain) Beñat San José	(Spain) Anaitz Arbilla	Hummel	Smartlog Group	List: Side: None; Back: None; Sleeves: None; Shorts: None
Elche	(Spain) Eder Sarabia	(Spain) Pedro Bigas	Nike	VegaFibra	List: Side: None; Back: CA Cerramientos Abatibles; Sleeves: SFIDANTE Inc.; Shorts: Amix Nutrition
Eldense	(Spain) José Luis Oltra	(Spain) Sergio Ortuño	Hummel	Finetwork	List: Side: None; Back: None; Sleeves: Elda te deja huella; Shorts: Caja Rural Central
Granada	(Spain) Pacheta	(Spain) Carlos Neva	Adidas	Saiko	List: Side: None; Back: Wiber; Sleeves: Caja Rural Granada; Shorts: None
Huesca	(Spain) Antonio Hidalgo	(Spain) Jorge Pulido	Soka	Tu Provincia Huesca La Magia	List: Side: None; Back: Kuhn, Sommos; Sleeves: Griffin Core Solutions; Shorts: Hinaco Constructora Inmobiliaria, Cervezas Ámbar
Levante	(Spain) Julián Calero	(Spain) José Luis Morales	Macron	Marcos Automoción	List: Side: None; Back: Silbö Telecom; Sleeves: Levante Blau Home; Shorts: None
Málaga	(Spain) Sergio Pellicer	(Spain) Ramón Enríquez	Hummel	Sabor a Málaga	List: Side: Olin Telecom; Back: Grupo Dental Clinics, Benahavís; Sleeves: Málaga; Shorts: MGS Seguros, Costa del Sol
Mirandés	(Italy) Alessio Lisci	(Spain) Sergio Postigo	Adidas	Miranda Empresas	List: Side: None; Back: Bodegas Izadi; Sleeves: None; Shorts: Alucoil
Real Oviedo	(Serbia) Veljko Paunović	(Spain) Santi Cazorla	Adidas	Digi	List: Side: Oviedo, origen del Camino; Back: Exiom Group, Hyundai Asturdai; Sleeves: Integra Energia; Shorts: Guanajuato Vive Grandes Historias, DEXTools
Racing Ferrol	(Spain) Alejandro Menéndez	(Spain) David Castro	Adidas	Estrella Galicia 0,0	List: Side: None; Back: Ferrol, Prace; Sleeves: A Coruña, unha provincia por descubrir; Shorts: Ferrol
Racing Santander	(Spain) José Alberto López	(Spain) Íñigo Sainz-Maza	Austral	Plenitude	List: Side: Cantabria Telecom; Back: Banco Santander, Leche El Buen Pastor; Sleeves: MGS Seguros; Shorts: Raisan, Camarsa
Sporting Gijón	(Spain) Asier Garitano	(Spain) Nacho Méndez	Puma	Siroko	List: Side: None; Back: None; Sleeves: Integra Energía; Shorts: Esfer, Cyasa Nissan
Tenerife	(Spain) Álvaro Cervera	(Spain) Aitor Sanz	Hummel	Tenerife! Despierta Emociones	List: Side: None; Back: DISA, Islas Canarias Latitud de vida; Sleeves: Egatesa; Shorts: Volkswagen, Eave
Zaragoza	(Spain) Gabi	(Spain) Francho Serrano	Adidas	Caravan Fragancias	List: Side: None; Back: Kosner, Cervezas Ámbar; Sleeves: MGS Seguros; Shorts: ACYF Group, Embou

=== Managerial changes ===
Team	Outgoing manager	Manner of departure	Date of vacancy	Position in table	Incoming manager	Date of appointment
Levante	(Spain) Felipe Miñambres	Return to director role	2 June 2024	Pre-season	(Spain) Julián Calero	8 June 2024
Granada	(Spain) José Ramón Sandoval	End of contract	30 June 2024	Pre-season	(Spain) Guille Abascal	19 June 2024
Almería	(Spain) Pepe Mel	End of contract	30 June 2024	Pre-season	(Spain) Rubi	3 June 2024
Cádiz	(Argentina) Mauricio Pellegrino	End of contract	30 June 2024	Pre-season	(Spain) Paco López	1 June 2024
Elche	(Argentina) Sebastián Beccacece	End of contract	30 June 2024	Pre-season	(Spain) Eder Sarabia	24 June 2024
Tenerife	(Spain) Asier Garitano	End of contract	30 June 2024	Pre-season	(Spain) Óscar Cano	3 June 2024
Cartagena	(Spain) Julián Calero	End of contract	30 June 2024	Pre-season	(Spain) Abelardo Fernández	6 June 2024
Sporting Gijón	(Spain) Miguel Ángel Ramírez	End of contract	30 June 2024	Pre-season	(Spain) Rubén Albés	22 June 2024
Eldense	(Spain) Fernando Estévez	End of contract	30 June 2024	Pre-season	(Spain) Dani Ponz	25 June 2024
Real Oviedo	(Spain) Luis Carrión	End of contract	30 June 2024	Pre-season	(Spain) Javier Calleja	6 July 2024
Tenerife	(Spain) Óscar Cano	Sacked	15 September 2024	22nd	(Spain) Pepe Mel	16 September 2024
Granada	(Spain) Guille Abascal	Sacked	20 September 2024	16th	(Spain) Fran Escribá	23 September 2024
Cartagena	(Spain) Abelardo Fernández	Sacked	25 September 2024	20th	(Spain) Jandro Castro	25 September 2024
Deportivo La Coruña	(Spain) Imanol Idiakez	Sacked	28 October 2024	20th	(Spain) Óscar Gilsanz (Note: Initially a caretaker, Gilsanz was confirmed as manager of the club on 5 November.)	31 October 2024
Burgos	(Spain) Bolo	Sacked	28 October 2024	16th	(Spain) Michu (caretaker)	29 October 2024
Burgos	(Spain) Michu	End of caretaker spell	31 October 2024	16th	(Spain) Luis Miguel Ramis	31 October 2024
Cádiz	(Spain) Paco López	Sacked	8 December 2024	19th	(Spain) Gaizka Garitano	8 December 2024
Zaragoza	(Spain) Víctor Fernández	Resigned	18 December 2024	13th	(Spain) David Navarro (caretaker)	19 December 2024
Tenerife	(Spain) Pepe Mel	Sacked	23 December 2024	22nd	(Spain) Álvaro Cervera	23 December 2024
Zaragoza	(Spain) David Navarro	End of caretaker spell	27 December 2024	11th	(Spain) Miguel Ángel Ramírez	27 December 2024
Cartagena	(Spain) Jandro Castro	Sacked	12 January 2025	21st	(Spain) Guillermo Fernández Romo	14 January 2025
Eldense	(Spain) Dani Ponz	Sacked	18 January 2025	19th	(Spain) José Luis Oltra	20 January 2025
Castellón	(Netherlands) Dick Schreuder	Sacked	20 January 2025	14th	(Netherlands) Johan Plat	20 January 2025
Racing Ferrol	(Spain) Cristóbal Parralo	Sacked	20 January 2025	20th	(Spain) Alejandro Menéndez	22 January 2025
Eibar	(Spain) Joseba Etxeberria	Sacked	16 February 2025	17th	(Spain) Beñat San José	17 February 2025
Zaragoza	(Spain) Miguel Ángel Ramírez	Sacked	16 March 2025	18th	(Spain) Gabi	17 March 2025
Real Oviedo	(Spain) Javier Calleja	Sacked	25 March 2025	6th	(Serbia) Veljko Paunović	26 March 2025
Sporting Gijón	(Spain) Rubén Albés	Sacked	6 April 2025	17th	(Spain) Asier Garitano	8 April 2025
Granada	(Spain) Fran Escribá	Sacked	14 May 2025	7th	(Spain) Pacheta	14 May 2025

== League table ==
Pos	Team	Pld	W	D	L	GF	GA	GD	Pts	Qualification or relegation
1	Levante (C, P)	42	22	13	7	69	42	+27	79	Promotion to La Liga
2	Elche (P)	42	22	11	9	59	34	+25	77	Promotion to La Liga
3	Oviedo (O, P)	42	21	12	9	56	42	+14	75 (Note: Oviedo finished ahead of Mirandés on head-to-head goal difference: Oviedo 4–1 Mirandés, Mirandés 1–0 Oviedo.)	Qualification for promotion playoffs
4	Mirandés	42	22	9	11	59	40	+19	75	Qualification for promotion playoffs
5	Racing Santander	42	20	11	11	65	51	+14	71	Qualification for promotion playoffs
6	Almería	42	19	12	11	72	55	+17	69	Qualification for promotion playoffs
7	Granada	42	18	11	13	65	54	+11	65	
8	Huesca	42	18	10	14	58	49	+9	64	
9	Eibar	42	15	13	14	44	41	+3	58 (Note: Eibar finished ahead of Albacete on head-to-head points: Albacete 0–1 Eibar, Eibar 1–1 Albacete.)	
10	Albacete	42	15	13	14	57	57	0	58	
11	Sporting Gijón	42	14	14	14	57	54	+3	56	
12	Burgos	42	15	10	17	41	48	−7	55 (Note: Burgos finished ahead of Cádiz and Córdoba on head-to-head points: Burgos 6 pts, Cádiz 5 pts, Córdoba 4 pts.)	
13	Cádiz	42	14	13	15	55	53	+2	55	
14	Córdoba	42	14	13	15	59	63	−4	55	
15	Deportivo La Coruña	42	13	14	15	56	54	+2	53 (Note: Deportivo La Coruña finished ahead of Málaga and Castellón on head-to-head points: Deportivo La Coruña 6 pts, Málaga 5 pts, Castellón 4 pts.)	
16	Málaga	42	12	17	13	42	46	−4	53	
17	Castellón	42	14	11	17	65	63	+2	53	
18	Zaragoza	42	13	12	17	56	63	−7	51	
19	Eldense (R)	42	11	12	19	44	63	−19	45	Relegation to Primera Federación
20	Tenerife (R)	42	8	12	22	35	55	−20	36	Relegation to Primera Federación
21	Racing Ferrol (R)	42	6	12	24	22	64	−42	30	Relegation to Primera Federación
22	Cartagena (R)	42	6	5	31	33	78	−45	23	Relegation to Primera Federación

Source: LaLiga Hypermotion
Rules for classification: 1) Points; 2) Head-to-head points; 3) Head-to-head goal difference; 4) Goal difference; 5) Goals scored; 6) Fair-play points
(Note: Head-to-head record is used only after all the matches between the teams in question have been played)
(C) Champions; (O) Play-off winners; (P) Promoted; (R) Relegated

== Results ==
Home \ Away	ALB	ALM	BUR	CAD	CAR	CAS	COR	DEP	EIB	ELC	ELD	GRA	HUE	LEV	MAL	MIR	OVI	RFE	RAC	SPO	TEN	ZAR
Albacete	—	2–1	2–0	3–0	3–1	0–0	1–1	2–5	0–1	1–0	0–1	0–2	3–2	0–0	2–0	3–2	2–2	2–0	2–2	3–3	2–1	2–1
Almería	3–1	—	2–0	1–1	2–1	2–5	4–0	2–1	2–2	1–1	5–0	2–1	0–0	1–0	2–2	1–0	1–1	2–1	2–0	1–1	2–0	4–1
Burgos	1–0	3–1	—	2–2	3–1	0–2	3–2	0–1	1–0	0–1	1–0	2–2	2–1	2–3	0–0	0–1	1–2	1–1	2–1	0–2	1–0	1–0
Cádiz	1–0	2–1	1–1	—	5–2	0–0	2–0	2–4	0–0	0–1	1–2	1–0	4–0	0–0	2–2	3–1	2–0	0–0	0–1	1–0	2–2	0–4
Cartagena	0–0	1–2	0–1	1–2	—	2–2	0–1	1–5	0–2	0–0	0–1	2–3	1–0	0–1	0–1	1–3	0–1	0–1	1–0	1–0	1–0	1–2
Castellón	2–2	4–1	2–1	1–3	4–1	—	1–2	2–2	2–0	0–2	1–1	2–3	0–1	2–0	2–0	1–3	0–0	0–0	0–1	4–3	2–1	4–1
Córdoba	1–1	0–3	2–2	4–2	2–1	2–2	—	2–0	2–1	1–2	2–0	5–0	1–2	2–2	0–0	1–2	0–0	3–1	1–2	1–1	3–0	2–2
Deportivo	5–1	3–1	0–2	1–0	2–2	5–1	1–1	—	1–0	0–4	1–1	2–3	0–0	1–2	0–0	0–4	0–1	1–0	1–2	1–1	0–0	1–1
Eibar	1–1	1–0	1–0	1–0	1–0	1–0	4–1	0–1	—	0–2	1–0	1–1	2–1	2–2	2–2	0–1	1–1	2–0	2–2	1–3	1–0	2–1
Elche	2–2	1–2	1–0	2–1	2–1	3–1	3–1	0–0	2–0	—	2–0	2–2	0–1	1–3	2–0	1–0	4–0	1–0	3–0	2–1	2–0	1–0
Eldense	2–0	1–0	0–0	1–4	1–2	2–3	1–1	2–0	1–3	0–0	—	0–3	2–1	1–2	1–0	2–2	1–1	0–0	3–3	1–2	2–1	2–3
Granada	1–2	3–1	0–0	0–0	4–1	2–1	1–0	1–1	0–2	1–1	3–2	—	1–3	1–2	2–2	0–0	1–0	3–0	3–0	3–1	4–0	2–2
Huesca	2–2	2–2	0–1	3–1	4–0	1–1	4–1	2–1	2–1	2–1	3–2	1–1	—	1–2	1–0	1–0	1–2	3–1	1–3	3–2	1–0	1–1
Levante	1–0	4–2	3–1	1–1	3–0	3–2	2–2	2–1	1–0	1–1	3–1	3–1	1–1	—	4–2	1–0	0–0	0–1	3–1	0–0	1–1	5–2
Málaga	2–1	1–1	2–2	0–2	1–0	1–0	0–1	1–1	1–0	0–3	3–0	1–0	1–0	1–1	—	1–1	0–0	2–0	0–0	2–1	1–0	1–2
Mirandés	2–0	0–0	2–1	2–2	3–1	3–2	1–0	2–2	1–0	3–0	1–0	0–1	1–0	2–1	3–2	—	1–0	4–1	2–1	1–1	2–0	0–0
Real Oviedo	1–0	3–2	3–1	2–1	1–0	1–0	2–3	1–2	1–0	1–1	0–0	2–0	0–3	1–0	2–1	4–1	—	3–0	1–3	1–1	3–1	1–0
Racing Ferrol	1–4	1–4	0–1	1–0	0–0	1–3	0–1	0–1	0–0	1–0	1–0	0–1	0–0	0–0	2–2	0–0	1–5	—	1–2	0–2	1–1	1–2
Racing Santander	1–1	2–2	2–0	2–3	1–2	1–1	2–0	2–1	2–2	2–0	2–2	2–1	0–1	1–0	2–1	0–1	1–1	6–0	—	1–0	2–1	2–0
Sporting Gijón	0–2	1–1	2–0	2–0	3–2	2–1	2–0	2–1	0–0	1–1	0–0	1–2	2–1	1–2	1–3	3–1	3–1	1–3	1–1	—	1–3	1–0
Tenerife	3–1	0–1	0–0	2–1	2–0	2–0	2–3	0–0	1–1	1–1	0–1	2–1	2–0	0–3	0–0	1–0	0–1	0–0	0–1	1–1	—	2–3
Zaragoza	0–1	1–2	0–1	0–0	3–2	1–2	1–1	1–0	2–2	3–0	2–4	2–1	1–1	2–1	0–0	1–0	2–3	1–0	2–3	1–1	2–2	—

Source: LaLiga
Legend: Blue = home team win; Yellow = draw; Red = away team win.

=== Positions by round ===
The table lists the positions of teams after each week of matches. In order to preserve chronological evolvements, any postponed matches are not included to the round at which they were originally scheduled, but added to the full round they were played immediately afterwards.

Team ╲ Round	1	2	3	4	5	6	7	8	9	10	11	12	13	14	15	16	17	18	19	20	21	22	23	24	25	26	27	28	29	30	31	32	33	34	35	36	37	38	39	40	41	42
Levante	5	7	6	5	1	6	1	3	4	9	6	2	5	7	7	5	5	7	6	8	5	5	5	4	7	7	7	6	4	2	1	1	2	2	2	2	2	2	2	1	1	1
Elche	20	21	14	19	18	14	11	13	13	11	11	10	6	8	8	9	6	5	5	5	4	2	4	2	5	3	4	1	5	3	4	3	1	1	1	1	1	1	1	3	2	2
Real Oviedo	9	10	13	17	11	12	9	10	8	7	4	8	4	4	2	7	8	8	4	4	6	7	6	5	6	5	5	2	6	6	6	6	6	5	5	4	4	4	5	4	3	3
Mirandés	8	9	9	9	6	8	6	8	6	2	8	3	7	6	5	3	3	2	3	3	2	4	3	6	3	4	1	5	3	1	3	2	4	4	4	5	5	5	3	2	4	4
Racing S.	13	12	4	3	2	1	3	1	1	1	1	1	1	1	1	1	1	1	1	2	3	3	2	1	1	1	2	3	1	4	2	4	3	3	3	3	3	3	4	5	5	5
Almería	10	5	8	12	17	17	20	17	19	17	12	13	13	12	9	2	2	3	2	1	1	1	1	3	2	6	6	7	7	7	7	7	7	7	7	8	7	6	6	6	6	6
Granada	14	11	17	16	16	16	17	14	11	6	3	6	9	5	4	6	7	6	10	7	8	8	8	8	8	8	8	8	8	8	8	8	8	8	8	6	6	7	7	7	7	7
Huesca	7	3	1	2	7	4	5	2	3	3	9	9	10	11	13	13	12	9	7	6	7	6	7	7	4	2	3	4	2	5	5	5	5	6	6	7	8	8	8	8	8	8
Eibar	6	6	5	4	3	5	7	9	7	10	7	11	11	13	11	12	11	13	11	12	13	11	10	11	13	14	17	16	15	13	14	12	13	13	12	12	13	15	13	9	9	9
Albacete	3	2	3	10	13	9	14	15	14	12	15	14	14	14	15	14	13	12	13	14	15	14	16	13	16	13	15	17	16	17	16	13	9	12	13	13	9	11	10	11	10	10
Sporting	15	16	18	11	14	15	13	7	5	8	5	7	3	2	3	4	4	4	9	9	9	9	9	10	9	9	9	10	11	12	13	16	16	17	15	14	15	17	15	17	14	11
Burgos	2	4	11	6	5	3	2	4	9	13	13	16	16	17	19	17	18	16	15	17	16	15	18	18	18	18	18	18	17	16	11	10	10	9	9	9	11	12	11	12	13	12
Cádiz	22	18	19	13	12	10	15	18	16	19	20	17	18	18	16	16	17	19	17	18	18	18	17	14	14	12	10	11	14	10	9	11	12	14	14	15	14	13	14	14	11	13
Córdoba	18	14	22	21	15	18	16	16	18	15	17	15	15	16	18	19	19	17	18	16	14	16	13	15	11	15	11	9	9	9	10	9	14	10	10	10	10	9	9	10	12	14
Deportivo	19	19	15	15	19	19	18	19	17	18	19	20	17	15	17	18	15	15	16	15	17	17	15	16	12	10	12	13	10	11	12	14	11	11	11	11	12	10	12	13	15	15
Málaga	11	13	7	8	8	7	12	12	12	14	14	12	12	10	10	11	14	14	14	11	10	10	11	12	15	16	14	12	13	15	17	15	15	16	17	17	17	14	17	15	16	16
Castellón	17	17	10	14	9	13	10	6	10	5	10	5	8	9	12	10	10	11	8	10	12	13	14	17	17	17	13	14	12	14	15	17	17	15	16	16	16	16	16	16	18	17
Zaragoza	1	1	2	1	4	2	4	5	2	4	2	4	2	3	6	8	9	10	12	13	11	12	12	9	10	11	16	15	18	18	18	18	18	18	18	18	18	18	18	18	17	18
Eldense	4	8	12	7	10	11	8	11	15	16	16	18	19	19	14	15	16	18	19	19	19	19	19	19	19	19	19	19	19	19	19	19	19	19	19	19	19	19	19	19	19	19
Tenerife	16	20	20	22	22	22	22	22	22	22	22	21	21	21	21	21	21	22	22	22	22	22	21	21	21	21	21	21	21	20	21	20	20	20	20	20	20	20	20	20	20	20
Racing F.	12	15	21	20	20	21	21	21	20	20	18	19	20	20	20	20	20	20	20	20	20	20	20	20	20	20	20	20	20	21	20	21	21	21	21	21	21	21	21	21	21	21
Cartagena	21	22	16	18	21	20	19	20	21	21	21	22	22	22	22	22	22	21	21	21	21	21	22	22	22	22	22	22	22	22	22	22	22	22	22	22	22	22	22	22	22	22

Promotion to La Liga
Qualification to promotion play-offs
Relegation to Primera Federación

Source: BDFútbol

== Promotion play-offs ==
Semi-finals
3	Real Oviedo	2	1	3
6	Almería	1	1	2
4	Mirandés	3	4	7
5	Racing Santander	3	1	4

Final
3	Real Oviedo (a.e.t.)	0	3	3
4	Mirandés	1	1	2

=== Semi-finals ===
Team 1	Agg.	Team 2	1st leg	2nd leg
Real Oviedo	3–2	Almería	2–1	1–1
Mirandés	7–4	Racing Santander	3–3	4–1

First leg

7 June 2025	Almería	1–2	Real Oviedo	Almería
21:00 UTC+2	Arribas 16'	Report	Vidal 14', 90+3'	Stadium: UD Almería Stadium; Attendance: 14,895; Referee: Dámaso Arcediano Monescillo

8 June 2025	Racing Santander	3–3	Mirandés	Santander
18:30 UTC+2	Vicente 40'; Martín 71'; Alonso 90+8' (o.g.)	Report	Izeta 31'; Rincón 34'; Reina 56'	Stadium: Campos de Sport de El Sardinero; Attendance: 22,394; Referee: Rafael Sánchez López

Second leg

11 June 2025	Real Oviedo	1–1 (3–2 agg.)	Almería	Oviedo
21:00 UTC+2	Cazorla 49'	Report	Melero 24' (pen.)	Stadium: Estadio Carlos Tartiere; Attendance: 25,921; Referee: Jon Ander González Esteban

12 June 2025	Mirandés	4–1 (7–4 agg.)	Racing Santander	Miranda de Ebro
21:00 UTC+2	Izeta 7', 70'; Ezkieta 63' (o.g.); Castro 66' (o.g.)	Report	Gueye 12'	Stadium: Estadio Municipal de Anduva; Attendance: 5,345; Referee: José Luis Guzmán Mansilla

=== Finals ===
Team 1	Agg.	Team 2	1st leg	2nd leg
Mirandés	2–3	Real Oviedo	1–0	1–3

First leg

15 June 2025	Mirandés	1–0	Real Oviedo	Miranda de Ebro
19:00 UTC+2	Reina 3'	Report		Stadium: Estadio Municipal de Anduva; Attendance: 5,409; Referee: Iosu Galech Apezteguía

Second leg

21 June 2025	Real Oviedo	3–1 (3–2 agg.)	Mirandés	Oviedo
21:00 UTC+2	Cazorla 39' (pen.); Chaira 52'; Portillo 103'	Report	Panichelli 16'	Stadium: Estadio Carlos Tartiere; Referee: Miguel Sesma Espinosa

== Season statistics ==
=== Scoring ===
- First goal of the season:
  (Spain) Miguel Rubio for Granada against Albacete (15 August 2024)

=== Top goalscorers ===
Rank	Player	Club	Goals
1	(Colombia) Luis Suárez	Almería	27
2	(Argentina) Joaquín Panichelli	Mirandés	20
3	(Spain) Andrés Martín	Racing Santander	16
4	(Spain) Yeremay Hernández	Deportivo La Coruña	15
5	(Brazil) Alemão	Real Oviedo	14
5	(Albania) Myrto Uzuni	Granada	14
7	(Spain) Juan Carlos Arana	Racing Santander	13
7	(Cameroon) Patrick Soko	Huesca	13
9	(Spain) Urko Izeta	Mirandés	12
9	(Colombia) Juan Otero	Sporting Gijón	12
9	(Spain) Raúl Sánchez	Castellón	12

=== Hat-tricks ===
Player	For	Against	Result	Date	Round	Ref.
(Spain) Lucas Pérez	Deportivo La Coruña	Cádiz	4–2 (A)	30 November 2024	17	
(Albania) Myrto Uzuni	Granada	Cartagena	4–1 (H)	17 December 2024	20	
(Colombia) Luis Suárez	Almería	Racing Ferrol	4–1 (A)	18 December 2024	20	
(Spain) Urko Izeta	Mirandés	Deportivo La Coruña	4–0 (A)	22 December 2024	21	
(Colombia) Juan Otero	Sporting Gijón	Castellón	3–4 (A)	5 May 2025	38	

Note

(H) – Home; (A) – Away

=== Zamora Trophy ===
The Zamora Trophy was awarded by newspaper Marca to the goalkeeper with the lowest goals-to-games ratio. A goalkeeper had to have played at least 28 games of 60 or more minutes to be eligible for the trophy.

Rank	Player	Club	Goals against	Matches	Average
1	(Argentina) Matías Dituro	Elche	33	38	0.87
2	(Spain) Dani Jiménez	Huesca	28	32	0.88
3	(Spain) Jonmi	Eibar	28	30	0.93
4	(Spain) Raúl Fernández	Mirandés	40	42	0.95
5	(Spain) Aarón Escandell	Real Oviedo	40	41	0.98

== Awards ==
=== Monthly ===
Month	Player of the Month		Reference
Month	Player	Club	Reference
August	(Spain) Andrés Martín	Racing Santander	
September	(Spain) Álex Sancris	Burgos	
October	(Spain) Iñigo Vicente	Racing Santander	
November	(Spain) Alfonso Herrero	Málaga	
December	(Cameroon) Patrick Soko	Huesca	
January	(Brazil) Alemão	Real Oviedo	
February	(Spain) Javier Ontiveros	Cádiz	
March	(Argentina) Joaquín Panichelli	Mirandés	
April	(Argentina) Lucas Boyé	Granada	

== Attendances ==
#	Football club	Average attendance
1	Málaga CF	24,857
2	Deportivo de La Coruña	21,571
3	Real Sporting de Gijón	21,131
4	Real Oviedo	20,673
5	Real Racing Club	20,212
6	Real Zaragoza	18,748
7	Elche CF	18,328
8	Levante UD	15,985
9	Córdoba CF	15,804
10	Granada CF	14,972
11	Cádiz CF	14,361
12	CD Tenerife	12,831
13	UD Almería	11,452
14	CD Castellón	10,914
15	Albacete Balompié	9,675
16	Burgos CF	9,620
17	SD Huesca	6,010
18	RC Ferrol	5,704
19	SD Eibar	5,020
20	FC Cartagena	4,796
21	CD Eldense	4,599
22	CD Mirandés	3,743

== See also ==
- 2024–25 La Liga
- 2024–25 Primera Federación
- 2024–25 Segunda Federación
- 2024–25 Tercera Federación
