= Alberto Reina =

Spanish footballer

Personal information
- Full name: Alberto Reina Campos
- Date of birth: 9 September 1997 (age 29)
- Place of birth: Chiclana de la Frontera, Spain
- Height: 1.68 m (5 ft 6 in)
- Position: Attacking midfielder

Team information
- Current team: Oviedo
- Number: 5

Youth career
- Chiclana Industrial
- 2015–2016: Betis

Senior career*
Years	Team	Apps	(Gls)
2016–2017	Betis B	0	(0)
2016–2017	→ Alcalá (loan)	33	(1)
2017–2019	Ceuta	55	(4)
2019–2020	Las Palmas B	31	(0)
2020–2023	Ceuta	69	(9)
2023–2025	Mirandés	81	(6)
2025–	Oviedo	37	(4)
- * Club domestic league appearances and goals as of 27 May 2026

Alberto Reina Campos (born 9 September 1997) is a Spanish footballer who plays as an attacking midfielder for Real Oviedo.

== Club career ==
Born in Chiclana de la Frontera, Cádiz, Andalusia, Reina joined Real Betis' youth setup on 19 June 2015, from hometown side Chiclana Industrial CF. On 12 September 2016, after finishing his formation, he was loaned to Tercera División side CD Alcalá until the end of the season.

Reina made his senior debut on 25 September 2016, coming on as a half-time substitute in a 3–0 home win over UB Lebrijana. He scored his first senior goal on 12 October, netting Alcalá's third in an away win over CD San Roque for the same scoreline.

On 9 July 2017, Reina signed for AD Ceuta FC also in the fourth division. On 15 January 2019, after being a regular starter for the side, he moved to UD Las Palmas and was assigned to the reserves in Segunda División B.

On 10 October 2020, Reina returned to Ceuta. An undisputed starter for the side, he scored a career-best eight goals during the 2021–22 campaign, as the club achieved promotion to Primera Federación.

On 15 June 2023, Reina agreed to a two-year contract with Segunda División team CD Mirandés. He made his professional debut on 14 August, starting in a 4–0 home routing of AD Alcorcón.

Reina scored his first professional goal on 19 November 2023, netting the opener in a 2–2 away draw against CD Eldense. He was an undisputed starter for the Jabatos during the 2024–25 season, scoring seven times as the club missed out promotion in the play-offs.

On 6 July 2025, Reina joined La Liga side Real Oviedo on a two-year deal.
