= 2025 Segunda División play-offs =

Football competition

Segunda División play-offs
- Season: 2024–25
- Promoted: Oviedo
- Matches: 6
- Goals: 21 (3.5 per match)

The 2024–25 Segunda División play-offs were played from 7 June to 21 June 2025 and determined the third team promoted to La Liga for the following season. Teams placed between 3rd and 6th position took part in the promotion play-offs.

== Regulations ==
The regulations were the same as the previous season: in the semi-finals, the fifth-placed team faced the fourth-placed team, while the sixth-placed team faced the third. Each tie were played over two legs, with the team lower in the table hosting the first leg.

The team that scored more goals on aggregate over the two legs advanced to the next round. If the aggregate score was level, then thirty minutes of extra time would be played. If the aggregate score was still level after extra time, the winner would be the best positioned team in the regular season.

== Road to the play-offs ==
Pos	Team	Pld	W	D	L	GF	GA	GD	Pts	Qualification or relegation
3	Oviedo (O, P)	42	21	12	9	56	42	+14	75 (Note: Oviedo finished ahead of Mirandés on head-to-head goal difference: Oviedo 4–1 Mirandés, Mirandés 1–0 Oviedo.)	Qualification for promotion playoffs
4	Mirandés	42	22	9	11	59	40	+19	75	Qualification for promotion playoffs
5	Racing Santander	42	20	11	11	65	51	+14	71	Qualification for promotion playoffs
6	Almería	42	19	12	11	72	55	+17	69	Qualification for promotion playoffs

Source: LaLiga Hypermotion
Rules for classification: 1) Points; 2) Head-to-head points; 3) Head-to-head goal difference; 4) Goal difference; 5) Goals scored; 6) Fair-play points
(Note: Head-to-head record is used only after all the matches between the teams in question have been played)
(O) Play-off winners; (P) Promoted

== Bracket ==
Semi-finals
3	Oviedo	2	1	3
6	Almería	1	1	2
4	Mirandés	3	4	7
5	Racing Santander	3	1	4

Final
3	Oviedo (a.e.t.)	0	3	3
4	Mirandés	1	1	2

=== Semi-finals ===
Team 1	Agg.	Team 2	1st leg	2nd leg
Oviedo	3–2	Almería	2–1	1–1
Mirandés	7–4	Racing Santander	3–3	4–1

First leg

7 June 2025	Almería	1–2	Oviedo	Almería
21:00 UTC+2	Arribas 16'	Report	Vidal 14', 90+3'	Stadium: UD Almería Stadium; Attendance: 14,895; Referee: Dámaso Arcediano Monescillo

8 June 2025	Racing Santander	3–3	Mirandés	Santander
18:30 UTC+2	Vicente 40'; Martín 71'; Alonso 90+8' (o.g.)	Report	Izeta 31'; Rincón 34'; Reina 56'	Stadium: Campos de Sport de El Sardinero; Attendance: 22,394; Referee: Rafael Sánchez López

Second leg

11 June 2025	Oviedo	1–1 (3–2 agg.)	Almería	Oviedo
21:00 UTC+2	Cazorla 49'	Report	Melero 24' (pen.)	Stadium: Estadio Carlos Tartiere; Attendance: 25,921; Referee: Jon Ander González Esteban

12 June 2025	Mirandés	4–1 (7–4 agg.)	Racing Santander	Miranda de Ebro
21:00 UTC+2	Izeta 7', 70'; Ezkieta 63' (o.g.); Castro 66' (o.g.)	Report	Gueye 12'	Stadium: Estadio Municipal de Anduva; Attendance: 5,345; Referee: José Luis Guzmán Mansilla

=== Finals ===
Team 1	Agg.	Team 2	1st leg	2nd leg
Mirandés	2–3	Oviedo	1–0	1–3 (a.e.t.)

First leg

15 June 2025	Mirandés	1–0	Oviedo	Miranda de Ebro
19:00 UTC+2	Reina 3'	Report		Stadium: Estadio Municipal de Anduva; Attendance: 5,409; Referee: Iosu Galech Apezteguía

Second leg

21 June 2025	Oviedo	3–1 (a.e.t.) (3–2 agg.)	Mirandés	Oviedo
21:00 UTC+2	Cazorla 39' (pen.); Chaira 52'; Portillo 103'	Report	Panichelli 16'	Stadium: Estadio Carlos Tartiere; Attendance: 29,624; Referee: Miguel Sesma Espinosa
