= Estadio Municipal de Anduva =

Stadium in Miranda de Ebro, Spain

Coordinates: 42°40′51″N 2°56′08″W

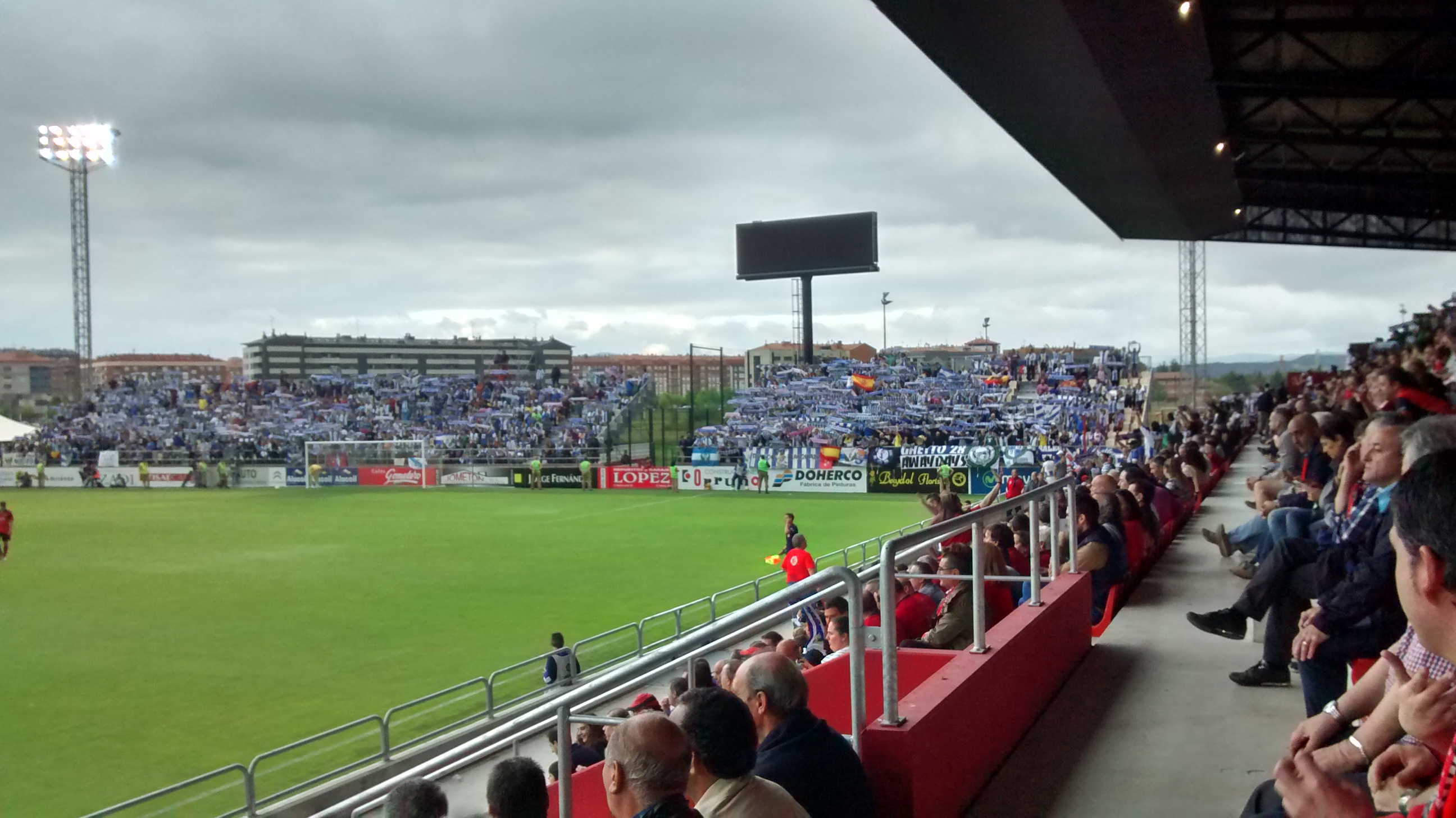
- The stadium during the promotion match of CD Leganés to La Liga.
- Interactive map of Estadio Municipal de Anduva
- Full name: Estadio Municipal de Anduva
- Location: Miranda de Ebro, Spain
- Capacity: 5,759
- Surface: Grass
- Record attendance: 7,980 (Mirandés vs Athletic Bilbao, 7 February 2012)
- Field size: 105×68 meters

Construction
- Opened: 1950
- Expanded: 2015

Tenants
- CD Mirandés; Spain national football team (selected matches)

Estadio Municipal de Anduva is a stadium in Miranda de Ebro, Spain. It has a capacity of 5,759 spectators and opened on 22 January 1950. It is the home of CD Mirandés of the Segunda División.

== History ==
The first game on the stadium was played on 22 December 1949. It was one month before the official opening of the stadium.

It also held other sporting events, most notably the friendly under-21 match between Spain and Poland (0–1) on 28 February 2006.

On 2 September 2010 the City Council provided €417,000 for the building of a new southern stand in the stadium.

The last improvement was the built of a completely new "General" stand with 3,250 seats, inaugurated on 23 July 2015.

== Gallery ==
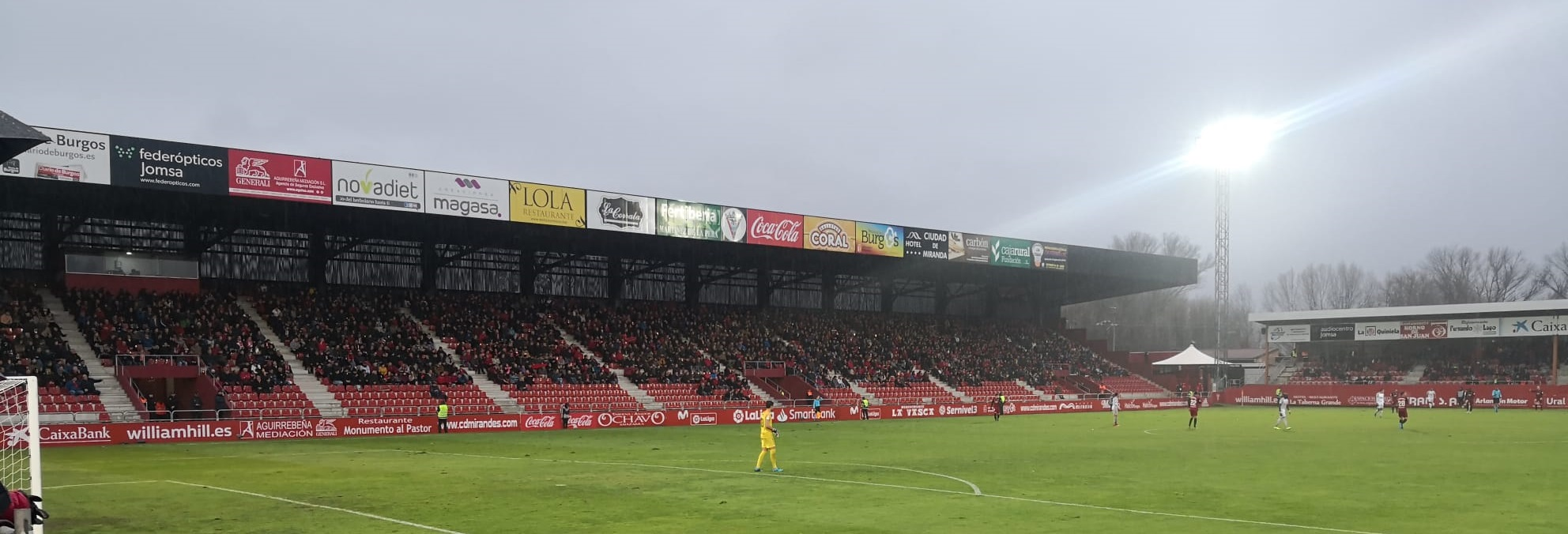
General stand of Anduva, inaugurated in 2015

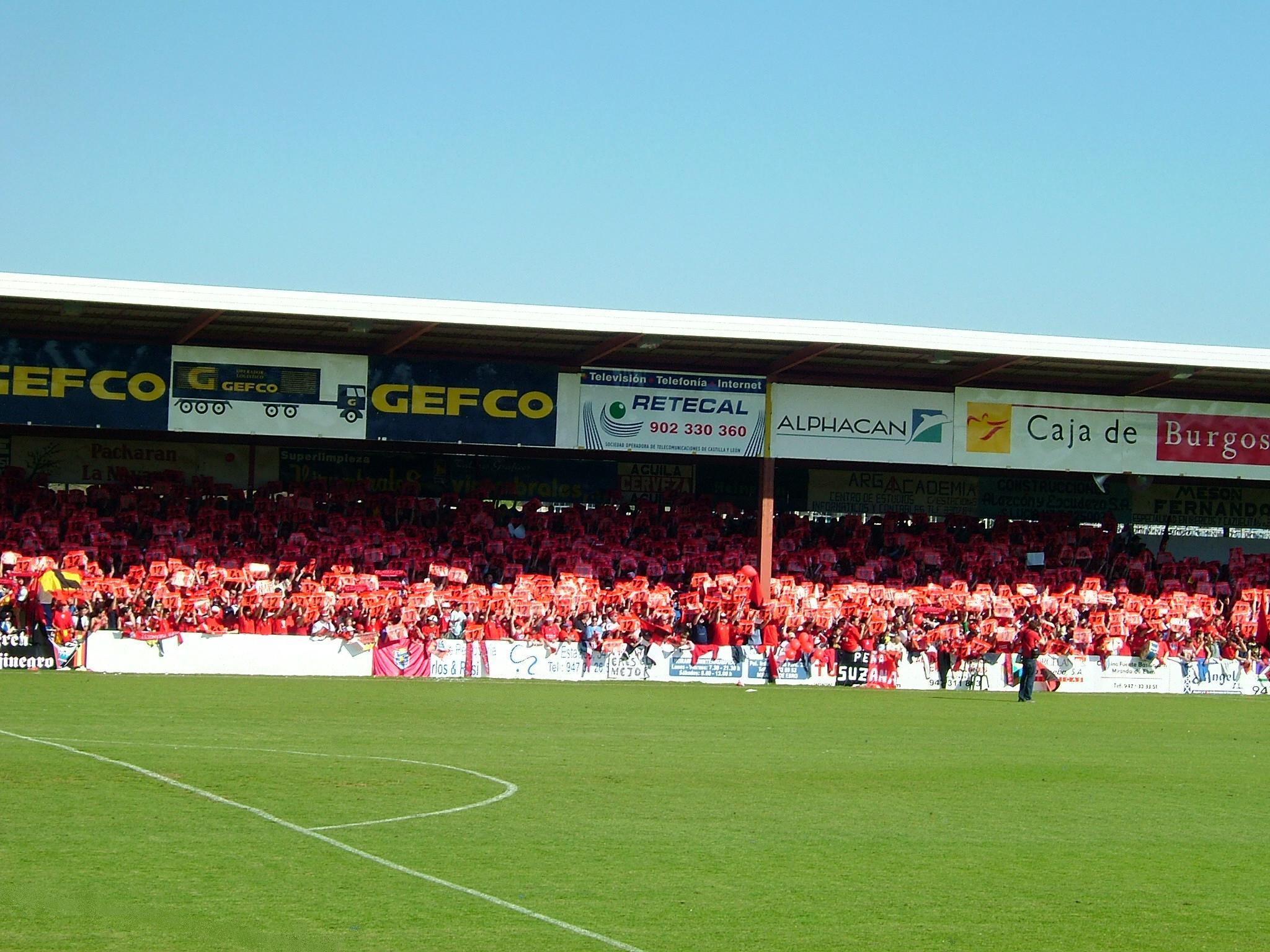
The old trubine, during a provincial derby against Burgos CF.

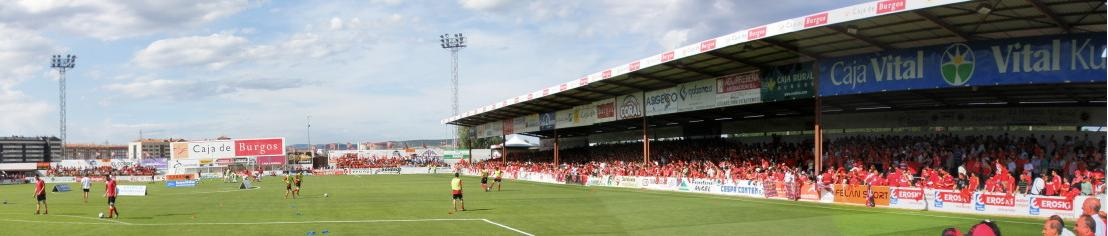
Estadio Municipal de Anduva
