= 2022–23 Levante UD season =

Levante UD
2022–23 season
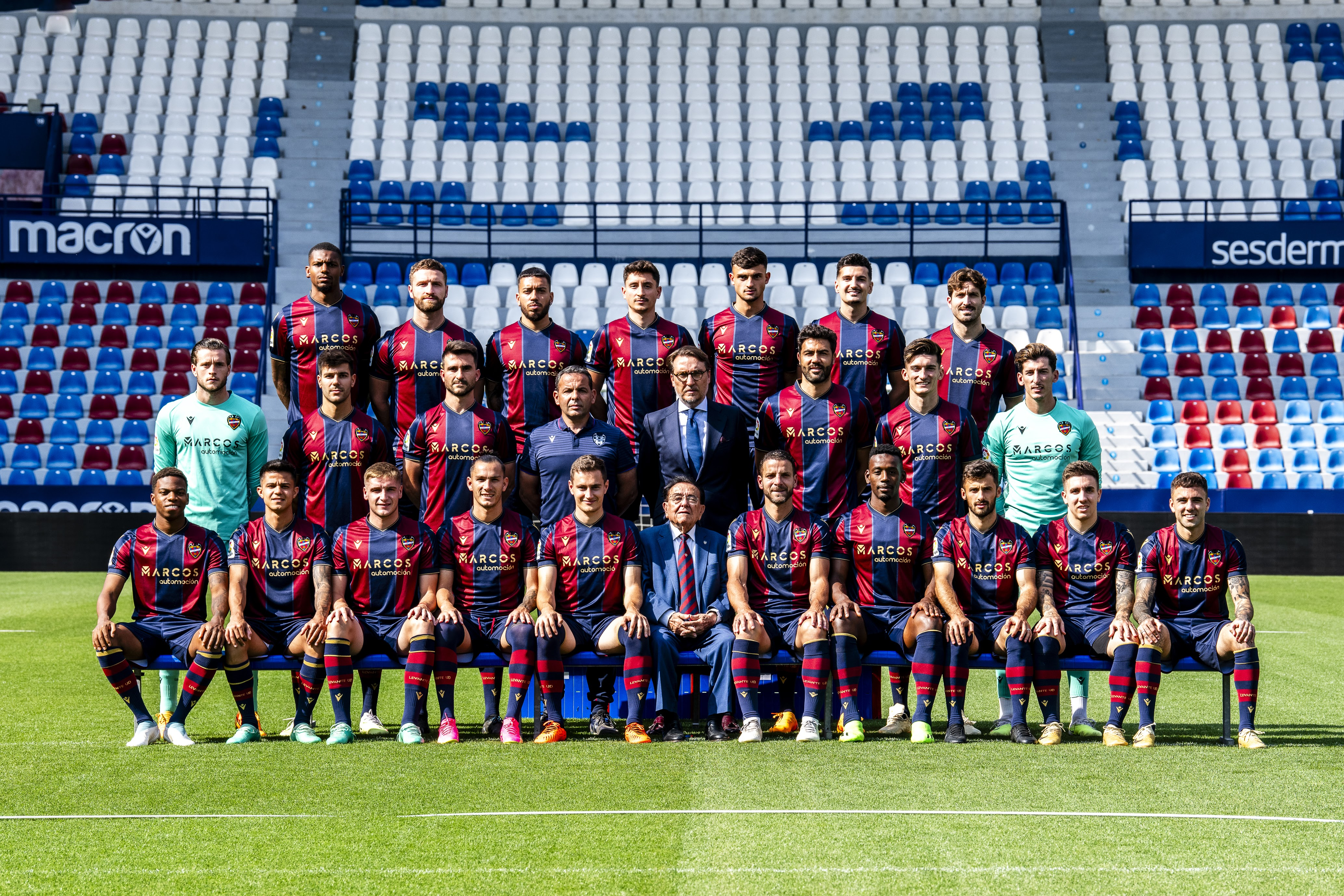
- President: Quico Catalán
- Head coach: Mehdi Nafti (until 10 October); Felipe Miñambres (caretaker, 10–16 October); Javier Calleja (from 16 October)
- Stadium: Estadi Ciutat de València
- Segunda División: 3rd
- Copa del Rey: Round of 16
- Top goalscorer: League: Mohamed Bouldini (8); All: Mohamed Bouldini (8)
Home colours	Away colours	Third colours

The 2022–23 season was the 84th season in the history of Levante UD and their first season back in the second division since 2017. The club participated in Segunda División and the Copa del Rey.

== Players ==
As of 29 October 2022.

Note: Flags indicate national team as defined under FIFA eligibility rules; some limited exceptions apply. Players may hold more than one non-FIFA nationality.

No.	Pos.	Nation	Player
1	GK	ESP	Dani Cárdenas
2	DF	ESP	Son
3	DF	ESP	Enric Franquesa
4	DF	ESP	Róber Pier
5	DF	GER	Shkodran Mustafi
6	MF	ESP	Pablo Martínez
7	FW	BRA	Wesley Moraes (on loan from Aston Villa)
8	MF	ESP	Pepelu
9	FW	ESP	Roberto Soldado
10	MF	ESP	Vicente Iborra (vice-captain; on loan from Villarreal)
11	FW	ESP	Álex Cantero
13	GK	ESP	Joan Femenías

No.	Pos.	Nation	Player
14	DF	POR	Rúben Vezo
15	DF	ESP	Sergio Postigo (captain)
16	DF	ESP	Álex Muñoz
17	FW	ESP	Roger Brugué
18	MF	ESP	Jorge de Frutos
19	MF	ESP	Rober Ibáñez
20	MF	ESP	Joni Montiel (on loan from Rayo Vallecano)
21	FW	BEL	Charly Musonda Jr.
22	FW	MAR	Mohamed Bouldini
23	DF	URU	Marcelo Saracchi
24	MF	ESP	José Campaña
29	DF	ESP	Marc Pubill

=== Reserve team ===
Note: Flags indicate national team as defined under FIFA eligibility rules; some limited exceptions apply. Players may hold more than one non-FIFA nationality.

No.	Pos.	Nation	Player
26	GK	ESP	Pablo Cuñat
31	DF	ESP	Carlos Giménez
33	FW	ESP	José Cambra

No.	Pos.	Nation	Player
35	MF	ESP	Hugo Redón
39	DF	ESP	Mario Climent

=== Out on loan ===
Note: Flags indicate national team as defined under FIFA eligibility rules; some limited exceptions apply. Players may hold more than one non-FIFA nationality.

No.	Pos.	Nation	Player
—	DF	ESP	Toni Herrero (at Amorebieta until 30 June 2023)
—	DF	ESP	Antonio Leal (at Unionistas until 30 June 2023)
—	MF	ESP	Álex Blesa (at Cultural Leonesa until 30 June 2023)
—	MF	GEO	Giorgi Kochorashvili (at Castellón until 30 June 2023)

No.	Pos.	Nation	Player
—	FW	SWE	Omar Faraj (at Degerfors until 31 December 2022)
—	FW	ESP	Dani Gómez (at Espanyol until 30 June 2023)
—	FW	BRA	Fabrício (at Castellón until 30 June 2023)
—	FW	ESP	Joan Pulpón (at Alzira until 30 June 2023)

== Transfers ==
=== In ===
Date	Player	From	Type	Fee	Ref
1 July 2022	(Spain) Joan Femenías	Oviedo	Transfer	Free	
8 July 2022	(Spain) Álex Muñoz	Tenerife	Transfer	Undisclosed	
14 July 2022	(Spain) Joni Montiel	Rayo Vallecano	Loan		
22 July 2022	(Brazil) Wesley	(England) Aston Villa	Loan		
29 July 2022	(Spain) Vicente Iborra	Villarreal	Loan		
10 August 2022	(Spain) Robert Ibáñez	Osasuna	Transfer	Free	
16 August 2022	(Belgium) Charly Musonda	(England) Chelsea	Transfer	Free	
23 August 2022	(Morocco) Mohamed Bouldini	(Portugal) Santa Clara	Transfer	Undisclosed	

=== Out ===
Date	Player	To	Type	Fee	Ref
1 July 2022	(Spain) José Luis Morales	Villarreal	Transfer	Free	
2 July 2022	(Spain) Aitor Fernández	Osasuna	Transfer	Free	
6 July 2022	(Russia) Edgar Sevikyan	(Russia) Pari Nizhny Novgorod	Transfer	Undisclosed	
19 July 2022	(Spain) Jorge Miramón	Leganés	Transfer	Free	
21 July 2022	(Spain) Carlos Clerc	Elche	Transfer	Free	
21 July 2022	(Sweden) Omar Faraj	(Sweden) Degerfors	Loan		
4 August 2022	(Spain) Roger Martí	Elche	Transfer	Undisclosed	
12 August 2022	(North Macedonia) Enis Bardhi	(Turkey) Trabzonspor	Transfer	Undisclosed	
12 August 2022	(Martinique) Mickaël Malsa	Real Valladolid	Transfer	Undisclosed	
19 August 2022	(Spain) Álex Blesa	Cultural Leonesa	Loan		
22 August 2022	(Spain) Dani Gómez	Espanyol	Loan		
25 August 2022	(Spain) Antonio Leal	Unionistas de Salamanca	Loan		
30 August 2022	(Georgia (country)) Giorgi Kochorashvili	Castellón	Loan		
1 September 2022	(Spain) Coke	Ibiza	Transfer	Free	
1 September 2022	(Spain) Gonzalo Melero	Almería	Transfer	Undisclosed	
19 January 2023	(Spain) Enric Franquesa	Leganés	Loan		

== Pre-season and friendlies ==
Win Draw Loss Fixtures

21 July 2022 Friendly	Levante	2–1	Wolverhampton Wanderers	Benidorm
10:30 CEST (UTC+2)	Roger 32', (red card) 44'; Bardhi (red card) 35'; Leal (yellow card) 53'; Kochorashvili 59'		Mosquera (red card) 35'; Podence (red card) 44'; Toti 82'	Stadium: Melia Villaitana Football Center; Attendance: 0 Referee: Jorge Tarraga Lajara

24 July 2022 Friendly	Getafe	0–0	Levante	San Pedro del Pinatar
10:30 CEST (UTC+2)				Stadium: Pinatar Arena

30 July 2022 Friendly	Levante	4–0	Castellón
CEST (UTC+2)

3 August 2022 Friendly	Villarreal	3–1	Levante	Villarreal
20:00 CEST (UTC+2)	Pier 17' (o.g.); Niño 25'; Morales 71' (pen.)		Iborra 90+1'	Stadium: Ciudad Deportiva Villarreal CF; Referee: Sergio Claudio Muresan

== Competitions ==
=== Overall record ===
Competition	First match	Last match	Starting round	Final position	Record							
Competition	First match	Last match	Starting round	Final position	Pld	W	D	L	GF	GA	GD	Win %
Segunda División	12 August 2022	27 May 2023	Matchday 1	3rd	42	18	18	6	46	30	+16	42.86
Segunda División promotion play-offs	3 June 2023	17 June 2023	Semi-finals	Runners-up	4	2	1	1	6	2	+4	50.00
Copa del Rey	12 November 2022	18 January 2023	First round	Quarter-final	4	3	0	1	9	5	+4	75.00
Total					50	23	19	8	61	37	+24	46.00

Source: Soccerway

=== Segunda División ===
==== League table ====
Pos	Team	Pld	W	D	L	GF	GA	GD	Pts	Qualification or relegation
1	Granada (C, P)	42	22	9	11	55	30	+25	75	Promotion to La Liga
2	Las Palmas (P)	42	18	18	6	49	29	+20	72 (Note: Overall goal difference: Las Palmas +20, Levante +16.)	Promotion to La Liga
3	Levante	42	18	18	6	46	30	+16	72	Qualification for promotion play-offs
4	Alavés (O, P)	42	19	14	9	47	33	+14	71 (Note: Alavés finished ahead of Eibar on head-to-head points: Eibar 0–0 Alavés, Alavés 2–0 Eibar.)	Qualification for promotion play-offs
5	Eibar	42	19	14	9	45	36	+9	71	Qualification for promotion play-offs

Source: LaLiga SmartBank
Rules for classification: 1) points; 2) head-to-head points; 3) head-to-head goal difference; 4) goal difference; 5) number of goals scored
(C) Champions; (O) Play-off winners; (P) Promoted
Notes:

Notes

1. Reserve teams are not eligible for promotion to the same league as the first team.

==== Results summary ====
Overall								Home						Away					
Pld	W	D	L	GF	GA	GD	Pts	W	D	L	GF	GA	GD	W	D	L	GF	GA	GD
42	18	18	6	46	30	+16	72	11	7	3	25	11	+14	7	11	3	21	19	+2

Source: LaLiga SmartBank

==== Results by round ====
Round	1	2	3	4	5	6	7	8	9	10	11	12	13	14	15	16	17	18	19	20	21	22	23	24	25	26	27	28	29	30	31	32	33	34	35	36	37	38	39	40	41	42
Ground	H	A	H	A	H	H	A	A	H	A	H	A	H	A	A	H	A	H	H	A	H	A	H	A	H	A	H	A	H	A	H	A	A	H	A	H	A	H	A	H	A	H
Result	D	D	W	D	W	L	D	L	L	W	W	W	W	D	W	D	D	W	D	W	D	D	W	D	W	W	W	D	W	L	D	D	W	D	D	L	D	W	L	D	W	W
Position	12	13	10	11	5	10	11	12	14	11	10	7	4	6	4	4	4	4	5	3	3	3	3	3	3	2	2	3	2	3	3	4	4	5	5	5	5	3	5	5	4	3

Source: LaLiga SmartBank
A = Away; H = Home; W = Win; D = Draw; L = Loss

==== Matches ====
The league fixtures were announced on 23 June 2022.

12 August 2022 1	Levante	0-0	Huesca	Valencia
21:00 CEST (UTC+2)	Saracchi (yellow card) 29' Rober Pier (yellow card) 34' Campana (yellow card) 45+3' Pepelu (yellow card) 65' Brugue* (red card) 90+3'	Report	Timor (yellow card) 57'	Stadium: Estadi Ciutat de València; Attendance: 12,677; Referee: Gonzalez Esteban J. A.
Note: *not on pitch

20 August 2022 2	Zaragoza	0-0	Levante	Zaragoza
19:30 CEST (UTC+2)		Report	Postigo (yellow card) 74'	Stadium: La Romareda; Attendance: 17,418; Referee: Frances R.

27 August 2022 3	Levante	2-0	Tenerife	Valencia
22:00 CEST (UTC+2)	Cantero 34' Vezo (yellow card) 49' Campana (yellow card) 52' Mustafi 83' Postigo (yellow card) 85'	Report	Dauda (yellow card) 40' Nacho (yellow card) 50' Shashoua (yellow card) 50' Rubio (yellow card) 52' Sanz (yellow card) 62' Leon (yellow card) 68' Sanz (yellow card) 90+2' (red card)	Stadium: Estadi Ciutat de València; Attendance: 12,249; Referee: Garcia V.

5 September 2022 4	Real Oviedo	1-1	Levante	Oviedo
21:00 CEST (UTC+2)	Enrich 16' Baston (yellow card) 25' Calvo (yellow card) 62' Montoro (yellow card) 90+6'	Report	Pepelu (yellow card) 25' Iborra 51' Wesley (yellow card) 69' Pepelu (yellow card) 71' (red card) Son (yellow card) 90+2' Cardenas (yellow card) 90+3' Soldado (yellow card) 90+5' Postigo (yellow card) 90+9' Iborra (yellow card) 90+9'	Stadium: Estadio Carlos Tartiere; Attendance: 13,519; Referee: Moreno A.

10 September 2022 5	Levante	4-1	Villarreal B	Valencia
21:00 CEST (UTC+2)	Soldado 1' de Frutos (yellow card) 28' Nafti* (yellow card) 29' Nafti* (yellow card) 29' (red card) Wesley (yellow card) 37' Cardenas (yellow card) 45+1' Vezo (yellow card) 48' Brugue 71' Montiel 86' Brugue (yellow card) 90' Cantero 90+3'	Report	Lozano (yellow card) 6' Miguel (yellow card) 33' del Moral (yellow card) 50' Lozano 53'	Stadium: Estadi Ciutat de València; Attendance: 12,907; Referee: Toca Lopez J.

29 April 2023 38	Levante	2–0	Alavés	Valencia
16:15 CEST (UTC+2)				Stadium: Ciutat de València; Referee: Mateo Busquets

6 May 2023 39	Tenerife	1–0	Levante	Santa Cruz de Tenerife
18:30 CEST (UTC+2)	Gallego 53'			Stadium: Heliodoro Rodríguez Lopéz; Referee: Rubén Ávalos Barrera

15 May 2023 40	Levante	0–0	Ibiza	Valencia
21:00 CEST (UTC+2)		Report		Stadium: Estadi Ciutat de València; Referee: Luis Mario Milla Alvendiz

20 May 2023 41	Villarreal B	2–3	Levante	Villarreal
18:30 CEST (UTC+2)				Stadium: Estadio de la Cerámica

27 May 2023 42	Levante	2–1	Oviedo	Valencia
21:00 CEST (UTC+2)				Stadium: Ciutat de València

=== Copa del Rey ===
12 November 2022 First round	Olot	0–4	Levante	Olot
17:00		Report	Soldado 6', 26'; Pubill 32'; Aimar 35' (o.g.)	Stadium: Municipal; Referee: Mateo Busquets Ferrer

21 December 2022 Second round	Levante	2–1	Andorra	Valencia
19:00	Brugué 12'; Cantero 42'	Report	Gil 59'	Stadium: Ciutat de València; Referee: Iosu Galech Apezteguía

3 January 2023 Round of 32	Levante	3–2	Getafe	Valencia
21:00 CET (UTC+1)	Postigo 52'; Muñoz 62'; Wesley 90+1'; Saracchi (yellow card) 90+4'; Vezo (yellow card) 90+4'; Iborra (red card) 90+4'	Report	Aleñá (yellow card) 22'; Munir 34', 56'; Duarte (yellow card) 46'; Djené (yellow card) 70'; Algobia (yellow card) 81'; Alderete (yellow card) 90+6'; Latasa (yellow card) 90+7'	Stadium: Ciutat de València; Attendance: 11,403; Referee: José María Sánchez Martínez

18 January 2023 Round of 16	Levante	0–2	Atlético Madrid	Valencia
21:00 CET (UTC+1)	Muñoz (yellow card) 70'; Campaña (yellow card) 85'	Report	Morata 54'; Llorente 90+1'	Stadium: Ciutat de València; Attendance: 18,000; Referee: Jorge Figueroa Vázquez
