= 2021–22 Levante UD season =

Levante UD
2021–22 season
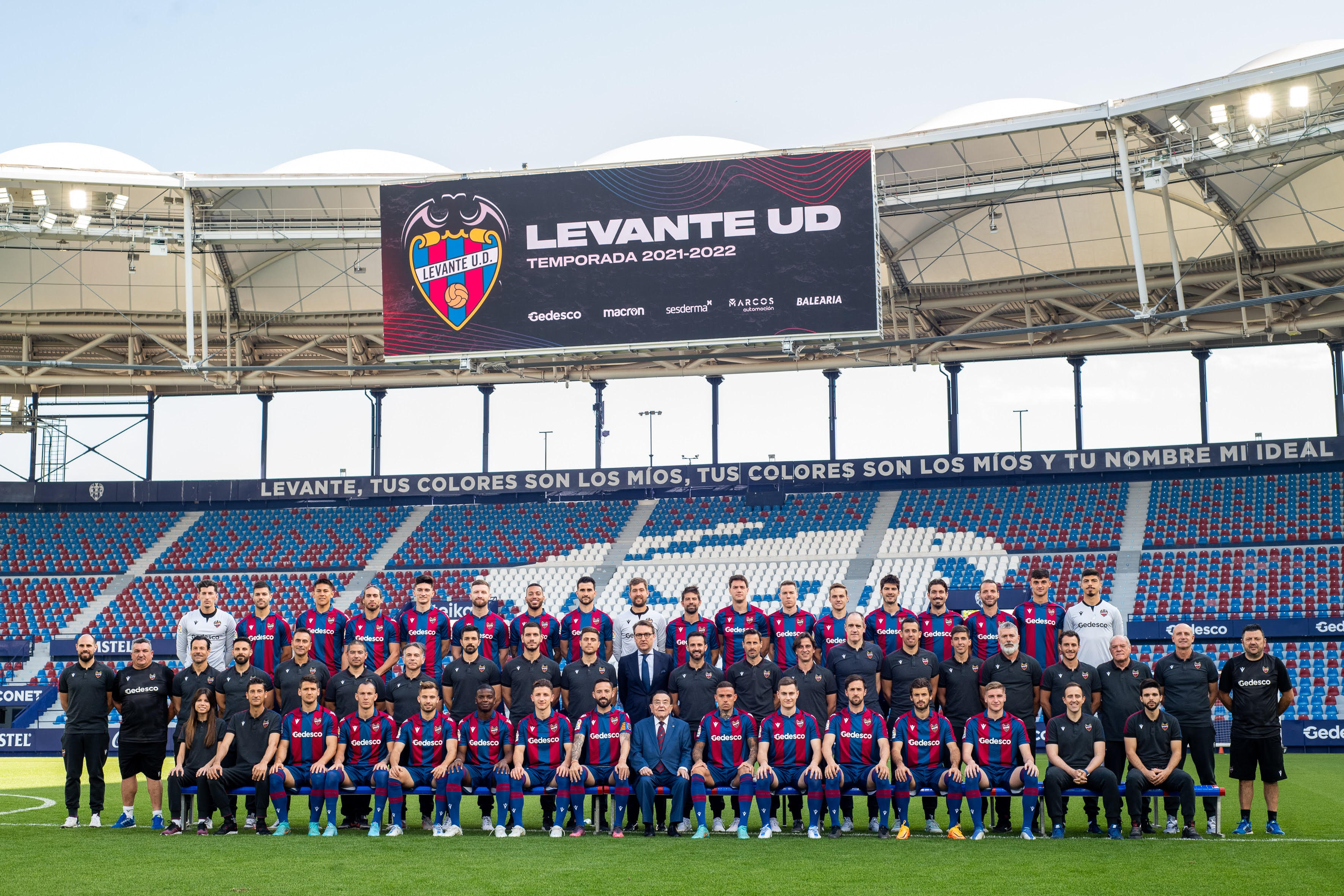
- President: Quico Catalán
- Head coach: Paco López (until 3 October); Javier Pereira (from 7 October until 29 November); Alessio Lisci (from 7 December)
- Stadium: Ciutat de València
- La Liga: 19th (relegated)
- Copa del Rey: Second round
- Top goalscorer: League: José Luis Morales (13); All: José Luis Morales (13)
- Highest home attendance: 20,785 vs Barcelona (10 April 2022)
- Lowest home attendance: 9,838 vs Real Madrid (22 August 2021)
- Biggest win: Huracán Melilla 0–8 Levante
- Biggest defeat: Real Madrid 6-0 Levante
Home colours	Away colours	Third colours

The 2021–22 season was the 83rd season in the existence of Levante UD and the club's fifth consecutive season in the top flight of Spanish football. In addition to the domestic league, Levante participated in this season's edition of the Copa del Rey.

== Players ==
=== First-team squad ===
As of 22 February 2022

Note: Flags indicate national team as defined under FIFA eligibility rules; some limited exceptions apply. Players may hold more than one non-FIFA nationality.

No.	Pos.	Nation	Player
1	GK	ESP	Aitor Fernández
2	DF	ESP	Son
3	DF	ESP	Enric Franquesa
4	DF	ESP	Róber Pier
5	MF	SRB	Nemanja Radoja
6	DF	CRC	Óscar Duarte
7	DF	URU	Martín Cáceres
8	MF	ESP	Pepelu
9	FW	ESP	Roger
10	MF	MKD	Enis Bardhi
11	FW	ESP	José Luis Morales (captain)
12	MF	MTQ	Mickaël Malsa
13	DF	GER	Shkodran Mustafi
14	DF	POR	Rúben Vezo

No.	Pos.	Nation	Player
15	DF	ESP	Sergio Postigo (Vice-captain)
16	FW	ESP	Roberto Soldado
17	MF	MNE	Nikola Vukčević
18	FW	ESP	Jorge de Frutos
19	DF	ESP	Carlos Clerc
20	DF	ESP	Jorge Miramón
21	FW	ESP	Dani Gómez
22	MF	ESP	Gonzalo Melero
23	DF	ESP	Coke
24	MF	ESP	José Campaña
25	DF	URU	Marcelo Saracchi
29	FW	ESP	Álex Cantero
34	GK	ESP	Dani Cárdenas

=== Reserve team ===
Note: Flags indicate national team as defined under FIFA eligibility rules; some limited exceptions apply. Players may hold more than one non-FIFA nationality.

No.	Pos.	Nation	Player
36	DF	ESP	Antonio Leal
37	GK	ESP	Pablo Cuñat
39	MF	ESP	Carlos Benítez

No.	Pos.	Nation	Player
40	FW	SWE	Omar Faraj
44	DF	ESP	Marc Pubill

=== Out on loan ===
Note: Flags indicate national team as defined under FIFA eligibility rules; some limited exceptions apply. Players may hold more than one non-FIFA nationality.

No.	Pos.	Nation	Player
—	MF	ESP	Pablo Martínez (at Huesca until 30 June 2022)
—	MF	ESP	Álex Blesa (at Castellón until 30 June 2022)

No.	Pos.	Nation	Player
—	FW	ESP	Brugui (at Mirandés until 30 June 2022)

== Transfers ==
=== In ===
Date	Player	From	Type	Fee	Ref
30 June 2021	(Portugal) Hernâni	(Saudi Arabia) Al Wehda	Loan return		
30 June 2021	(Spain) Pablo Martínez	Mirandés	Loan return		
30 June 2021	(Spain) Arturo Molina	Castellón	Loan return		
30 June 2021	(Spain) Pepelu	(Portugal) Vitória Guimarães	Loan return		
30 June 2021	(Spain) Koke Vegas	Mallorca	Loan return		
1 July 2021	(Spain) Roberto Soldado	Granada	Transfer	Free	
2 July 2021	(Spain) Enric Franquesa	Villarreal	Transfer	Undisclosed	

== Pre-season and friendlies ==
Win Draw Loss Fixtures

24 July 2021 Friendly	Levante	3–1	Rennes	San Pedro del Pinatar, Spain
18:00 CEST (UTC+2)	Soldado 1'; De Frutos 25'; Morales 33'	Report	Tait 56'	Stadium: Pinatar Arena Football Center; Referee: Salva Abril Portillo

27 July 2021 Friendly	Levante	2–1	Atromitos	San Pedro del Pinatar, Spain
19:00 CEST (UTC+2)	Vezo 37'; Postigo 69'	Report	Koulouris 54'	Stadium: Pinatar Arena Football Center; Referee: Alejandro Clemente Ortuño

29 July 2021 Friendly	Villarreal	0–0	Levante	Villarreal, Spain
19:00 CEST (UTC+2)	Baena (yellow card) 74'	Report	Soldado (yellow card) 43'; Martínez (yellow card) 53'	Stadium: Ciudad Deportiva; Referee: Iván Caparrós Hernández

30 July 2021 Friendly	Valencia	1–0	Levante	Paterna, Spain
19:00 CEST (UTC+2)	Alderete 71'; Burlamaqui (yellow card) 72'; Menargues (yellow card) 89'	Report	Radoja (yellow card) 27'; Vezo (yellow card) 47'; Malsa (red card) 56'; Postigo (yellow card) 81'	Stadium: Ciudad Deportiva de Paterna; Attendance: 0 Referee: Saúl Ais Reig

31 July 2021 Friendly	Levante	Cancelled	Beşiktaş	La Nucía, Spain
19:00 CEST (UTC+2)				Stadium: Estadi Olímpic Camilo Cano

4 August 2021 Friendly	Southampton	1–0	Levante	Southampton, England
19:00 BST (UTC+1)	Walker-Peters 62'	Report		Stadium: St Mary's Stadium; Referee: Tim Robinson

6 August 2021 Friendly	Levante	0–1	Alavés	San Pedro del Pinatar, Spain
20:00 CEST (UTC+2)		Report	Joselu 90+2' (pen.)	Stadium: Pinatar Arena Football Center

7 August 2021 Friendly	Elche	1–2	Levante	Elche, Spain
21:00 CEST (UTC+2)	Boyé 65'	Report	Melero 53'; Morales 80'	Stadium: Estadio Manuel Martínez Valero

11 August 2021 Friendly	Levante	0–2	Castellón	Buñol, Spain
19:00 CEST (UTC+2)		Report	Kone 34'; Cubillas 42'	Stadium: Ciudad Deportiva Levante; Attendance: 0 Referee: Miguel García Aceña

== Competitions ==
=== Overall record ===
Competition	First match	Last match	Starting round	Final position	Record							
Competition	First match	Last match	Starting round	Final position	Pld	W	D	L	GF	GA	GD	Win %
La Liga	14 August 2021	20 May 2022	Matchday 1	19th	38	8	11	19	51	76	−25	21.05
Copa del Rey	2 December 2021	14 December 2021	First round	Second round	2	1	1	0	11	3	+8	50.00
Total					40	9	12	19	62	79	−17	22.50

Last updated: 20 May 2022
Source: Soccerway

=== La Liga ===
==== League table ====
Pos	Team	Pld	W	D	L	GF	GA	GD	Pts	Qualification or relegation
16	Mallorca	38	10	9	19	36	63	−27	39 (Note: Head-to-head points: Getafe 8, Mallorca 5, Cádiz 2.)	
17	Cádiz	38	8	15	15	35	51	−16	39	
18	Granada (R)	38	8	14	16	44	61	−17	38	Relegation to Segunda División
19	Levante (R)	38	8	11	19	51	76	−25	35	Relegation to Segunda División
20	Alavés (R)	38	8	7	23	31	65	−34	31	Relegation to Segunda División

Source: LaLiga Santander
Rules for classification: 1) Points; 2) Head-to-head points; 3) Head-to-head goal difference; 4) Goal difference; 5) Goals scored; 6) Fair-play points (Note: Head-to-head record is used only after all the matches between the teams in question have been played)
(R) Relegated

==== Results summary ====
Overall								Home						Away					
Pld	W	D	L	GF	GA	GD	Pts	W	D	L	GF	GA	GD	W	D	L	GF	GA	GD
38	8	11	19	51	76	−25	35	5	7	7	28	30	−2	3	4	12	23	46	−23

Last updated: 20 May 2022.
Source: La Liga

==== Results by round ====
Round	1	2	3	4	5	6	7	8	9	10	11	12	13	14	15	16	17	18	19	20	21	22	23	24	25	26	27	28	29	30	31	32	33	34	35	36	37	38
Ground	A	H	A	H	A	H	A	A	H	A	H	H	A	H	A	H	A	H	A	H	A	H	A	H	A	H	A	H	A	H	H	A	H	A	H	A	H	A
Result	D	D	L	D	D	L	L	L	D	L	D	L	L	D	L	D	L	L	L	W	W	L	L	L	D	W	L	D	L	W	L	W	L	D	W	L	W	W
Position	7	8	13	14	15	16	17	18	18	19	19	19	19	20	20	20	20	20	20	20	20	20	20	20	20	20	20	20	20	19	19	19	19	20	19	20	19	19

Updated to match(es) played on 20 May 2022. Source: La Liga
A = Away; H = Home; W = Win; D = Draw; L = Loss

==== Matches ====
The league fixtures were announced on 30 June 2021.

14 August 2021 1	Cádiz	1–1	Levante	Cádiz
19:30 CEST (UTC+2)	Espino (yellow card) 28', (goal) 90+7'	Report	Melero (yellow card) 21'; Morales 39', (yellow card) 90+3'; Soldado (yellow card) 47'; Campaña (yellow card) 62'; Duarte (yellow card) 83'	Stadium: Nuevo Mirandilla; Attendance: 6,941; Referee: Santiago Jaime Latre

22 August 2021 2	Levante	3–3	Real Madrid	Valencia
22:00 CEST (UTC+2)	Clerc (yellow card) 28'; Melero (yellow card) 41'; Roger 46'; Campaña 57', (yellow card) 58'; Pier 79'; Fernández (red card) 87'	Report	Bale 5'; Militão (yellow card) 58'; Vinícius 73', 85'; Rodrygo (yellow card) 90+2'	Stadium: Ciutat de València; Attendance: 9,838; Referee: Guillermo Cuadra Fernández

28 August 2021 3	Real Sociedad	1–0	Levante	San Sebastián
19:30 CEST (UTC+2)	Barrenetxea 42'; Gorosabel (yellow card) 84'	Report	Cantero (yellow card) 18'	Stadium: Anoeta; Attendance: 7,758; Referee: José Luis Munuera Montero

11 September 2021 4	Levante	1–1	Rayo Vallecano	Valencia
18:30 CEST (UTC+2)	Martínez (yellow card) 16'; Roger 39' (pen.); Morales (yellow card) 45+1'; Malsa (yellow card) 66'	Report	Ciss (yellow card) 43'; Comesaña (yellow card) 45+4'; Á. García (yellow card) 54'; Balliu (yellow card) 82'; Guardiola 90+2'	Stadium: Ciutat de València; Attendance: 12,974; Referee: Javier Alberola Rojas

18 September 2021 5	Elche	1–1	Levante	Elche
18:30 CEST (UTC+2)	Roco (yellow card) 29'; Pérez 33'; Verdú (yellow card) 55'	Report	Martínez (yellow card) 53'; Morales 55'; Vezo (yellow card) 82'	Stadium: Estadio Manuel Martínez Valero; Attendance: 11,507; Referee: Miguel Ángel Ortiz Arias

21 September 2021 6	Levante	0–2	Celta Vigo	Valencia
22:00 CEST (UTC+2)	Roger (yellow card) 9', (penalty missed) 72'; Miramón (yellow card) 59'; De Frutos (yellow card) 90'	Report	Tapia (yellow card) 4'; Aspas 66'; Méndez 85'	Stadium: Ciutat de València; Attendance: 11,989; Referee: Jorge Figueroa Vázquez

26 September 2021 7	Barcelona	3–0	Levante	Barcelona
16:15 CEST (UTC+2)	Depay 6' (pen.); L. de Jong 14'; Gavi (yellow card) 24'; Fati 90+1'	Report	Postigo (yellow card) 25'; Pepelu (yellow card) 58'; Clerc (yellow card) 86'	Stadium: Camp Nou; Attendance: 35,334; Referee: Isidro Díaz De Mera Escuderos

2 October 2021 8	Mallorca	1–0	Levante	Palma
16:15 CEST (UTC+2)	Baba (yellow card) 41', (goal) 74'; Costa (yellow card) 65'; Mboula (yellow card) 84'; Amath (yellow card) 90+5'	Report	Roger (yellow card) 40'; Melero (yellow card) 45+1'; Morales (penalty missed) 85'; Pier (yellow card) 86'; Pepelu (yellow card) 88'	Stadium: Visit Mallorca Stadium; Attendance: 11,803; Referee: Alejandro Muñiz Ruiz

16 October 2021 9	Levante	0–0	Getafe	Valencia
18:30 CEST (UTC+2)	Miramón (yellow card) 39'; Morales (yellow card) 58'; Clerc (yellow card) 64'	Report	Timor (yellow card) 29'; Olivera (yellow card) 49'; Arambarri (yellow card) 68'	Stadium: Ciutat de València; Attendance: 14,551; Referee: Mario Melero López

24 October 2021 10	Sevilla	5–3	Levante	Seville
14:00 CEST (UTC+2)	Torres 8'; Mir 24'; Diego Carlos 38'; Munir 50'; Fernando 64', (yellow card) 78'	Report	Morales 33', 55'; Melero 62'; Malsa (yellow card) 66'; Clerc (yellow card) 71'	Stadium: Ramón Sánchez Pizjuán; Attendance: 30,601; Referee: Valentín Pizarro Gómez

28 October 2021 11	Levante	2–2	Atlético Madrid	Valencia
21:30 CEST (UTC+2)	Bardhi 37' (pen.), 90' (pen.); Pepelu (yellow card) 40'; Pier (yellow card) 90+6' (yellow-red card) 90+9'	Report	Griezmann 12'; Hermoso (yellow card) 18'; Felipe (yellow card) 25'; Koke (yellow card) 65'; Cunha 76'; Giménez (yellow card) 85'; Correa (yellow card) 87'	Stadium: Ciutat de València; Attendance: 16,298; Referee: Pablo González Fuertes

1 November 2021 12	Levante	0–3	Granada	Valencia
21:00 CET (UTC+1)	Malsa (yellow card) 25'; Bardhi (yellow card) 71'; Soldado (yellow card) 78'; Vukčević (yellow card) 83'	Report	Sánchez 7', (yellow card) 21'; Suárez 38'; Puertas 69'; Escudero (yellow card) 90'	Stadium: Ciutat de València; Attendance: 14,512; Referee: José María Sánchez Martínez

6 November 2021 13	Alavés	2–1	Levante	Vitoria-Gasteiz
18:30 CET (UTC+1)	Moya (yellow card) 12'; Guidetti (yellow card) 71'; Joselu 77' (pen.), 90+1'; Laguardia (yellow card) 90+5'	Report	De Frutos 13'; Franquesa (yellow card) 55'; Cárdenas (yellow card) 90+1'; Pepelu (yellow card) 90+5'	Stadium: Mendizorrotza; Attendance: 12,176; Referee: Adrián Cordero Vega

19 November 2021 14	Levante	0–0	Athletic Bilbao	Valencia
21:00 CET (UTC+1)	Roger (yellow card) 6'; Vezo (yellow card) 90+3'	Report	Yeray (yellow card) 16'	Stadium: Ciutat de València; Attendance: 15,230; Referee: José Luis Munuera Montero

28 November 2021 15	Real Betis	3–1	Levante	Seville
14:00 CET (UTC+1)	Ruiz (yellow card) 40'; Juanmi 54', 63', 78'; Fekir (yellow card) 71'	Report	Mustafi 7'; Vezo (yellow card) 17'; Roger (yellow card) 29'; Malsa (yellow card) 67'	Stadium: Benito Villamarín; Attendance: 45,012; Referee: Miguel Ángel Ortiz Arias

5 December 2021 16	Levante	0–0	Osasuna	Valencia
18:30 CET (UTC+1)	Radoja (yellow card) 34'; De Frutos (yellow card) 45'	Report	Vidal (yellow card) 54'; Brašanac (yellow card) 69'; Torró (yellow card) 90+4'	Stadium: Ciutat de València; Attendance: 15,361; Referee: Valentín Pizarro Gómez

11 December 2021 17	Espanyol	4–3	Levante	Cornellà de Llobregat
14:00 CET (UTC+1)	Darder 6'; Herrera (yellow card) 9'; Embarba (yellow card) 36'; De Tomás 49'; Vidal (yellow card) 57'; Puado 60', 76'; Bare (yellow card) 81'	Report	De Frutos 11'; Son 26', (red card) 78'; Morales 57'; Campaña (yellow card) 66'; Malsa (yellow card) 80'; Soldado (yellow card) 86'	Stadium: RCDE Stadium; Attendance: 15,193; Referee: Adrián Cordero Vega

20 December 2021 18	Levante	3–4	Valencia	Valencia
21:00 CET (UTC+1)	Campaña (penalty missed) 21', 21'; Pepelu (yellow card) 23'; Roger 24'; Morales (yellow card) 58'; Soldado (yellow card) 90'; Bardhi 90+1'	Report	Diakhaby (yellow card) 20'; Guedes 44', 85'; Soler 50' (pen.), 72'; Račić (yellow card) 60'; Iranzo (yellow card) 80'; Costa (yellow card) 88'	Stadium: Ciutat de València; Attendance: 18,851; Referee: Pablo González Fuertes

3 January 2022 19	Villarreal	5–0	Levante	Villarreal
19:00 CET (UTC+1)	Dia 8'; Aurier (yellow card) 10'; Torres 13'; Gerard 37', 79'; Iborra (yellow card) 50'; Trigueros 74', (yellow card) 76'	Report	Bardhi (yellow card) 4'; Clerc (yellow card) 48'	Stadium: Estadio de la Cerámica; Attendance: 13,462; Referee: Alejandro Hernández Hernández

8 January 2022 20	Levante	2–0	Mallorca	Valencia
14:00 CET (UTC+1)	Soldado 47'; Pepelu (yellow card) 67'; Miramón (yellow card) 68'; Morales 90+7'	Report	Maffeo (yellow card) 2'; Oliván (penalty missed) 68'	Stadium: Ciutat de València; Attendance: 13,330; Referee: Jorge Figueroa Vázquez

22 January 2022 22	Levante	0–2	Cádiz	Valencia
14:00 CET (UTC+1)	Bardhi (yellow card) 49'; Clerc (yellow card) 68'; Fernández (yellow card) 76'; Morales (yellow card) 76'	Report	Fali (yellow card) 23'; Negredo 34'; Lozano (yellow card) 50'; Salvi (yellow card) 59', (goal) 74'; Ledesma (yellow card) 68'; Alejo (yellow card) 76'; Haroyan (yellow card) 90'	Stadium: Ciutat de València; Attendance: 14,063; Referee: César Soto Grado

4 February 2022 23	Getafe	3–0	Levante	Getafe
21:00 CET (UTC+1)	Ünal 1', 29'; Arambarri (yellow card) 56'; Mitrović (yellow card) 66'; Suárez (yellow card) 77'; Aleñá 90+4'; Cuenca (yellow card) 90+6'	Report	Duarte (yellow card) 17'; Roger (yellow card) 58'; Son (yellow card) 90+4'	Stadium: Coliseum Alfonso Pérez; Attendance: 8,475; Referee: Alejandro Muñiz Ruiz

13 February 2022 24	Levante	2–4	Real Betis	Valencia
16:15 CET (UTC+1)	Gómez 43', 47'; Cáceres (yellow card) 48'; Soldado (red card) 74'	Report	Fekir 14', 49'; Pezzella (yellow card) 22'; González 29'; Carvalho 42'; Bellerín (yellow card) 57'	Stadium: Ciutat de València; Attendance: 16,103; Referee: Santiago Jaime Latre

16 February 2022 21	Atlético Madrid	0–1	Levante	Madrid
19:00 CET (UTC+1)	De Paul (yellow card) 26'; Savić (yellow card) 85'; Correa (yellow card) 90+7'	Report	Melero 54'; Pepelu (yellow card) 70'; Gómez (yellow card) 76'; Miramón (yellow card) 85'; Son (yellow card) 90+7'	Stadium: Wanda Metropolitano; Attendance: 43,456; Referee: José Luis Munuera Montero

21 February 2022 25	Celta Vigo	1–1	Levante	Vigo
21:00 CET (UTC+1)	Araujo (yellow card) 45'; Cervi (yellow card) 57', (goal) 67'; Aspas (yellow card) 90'	Report	Melero (yellow card) 25'; Cáceres (yellow card) 40'; Cárdenas (yellow card) 55'; Roger 82', (yellow card) 87'; De Frutos (yellow card) 90+2'	Stadium: Balaídos; Attendance: 9,776; Referee: Valentín Pizarro Gómez

25 February 2022 26	Levante	3–0	Elche	Valencia
21:00 CET (UTC+1)	Morales 37'; De Frutos 67', (yellow card) 69'; Melero 90'	Report	Barragán (yellow card) 59'; Gumbau (red card) 73'; Roco (yellow card) 83'	Stadium: Ciutat de València; Attendance: 14,237; Referee: Pablo González Fuertes

7 March 2022 27	Athletic Bilbao	3–1	Levante	Bilbao
21:00 CET (UTC+1)	Berenguer (yellow card) 14'; Vesga 63'; I. Williams 76'; Zarraga 88' (pen.)	Report	Miramón (yellow card) 20'; Son (yellow card) 37'; De Frutos 90+1'	Stadium: San Mamés; Attendance: 29,435; Referee: Alejandro Muñiz Ruiz

12 March 2022 28	Levante	1–1	Espanyol	Valencia
14:00 CET (UTC+1)	Duarte (yellow card) 35'; Melero (yellow card) 40'; Gómez 80'; Pier (yellow card) 90'; Campaña (yellow card) 90+4'	Report	Pedrosa (yellow card) 18'; Puado 50', (yellow card) 55'; Calero (yellow card) 71'; Embarba (yellow card) 90+3'	Stadium: Ciutat de València; Attendance: 13,407; Referee: Isidro Díaz De Mera Escuderos

19 March 2022 29	Osasuna	3–1	Levante	Pamplona
18:30 CET (UTC+1)	Ávila 44'; Budimir 57'; Brašanac 64'	Report	Pubill (yellow card) 47'; Roger 76'	Stadium: El Sadar; Attendance: 19,429; Referee: Javier Alberola Rojas

2 April 2022 30	Levante	2–0	Villarreal	Valencia
16:15 CEST (UTC+2)	Morales (yellow card) 21', (goal) 69', 90+1'; Roger (yellow card) 56'; Malsa (yellow card) 88'; Pepelu (yellow card) 89'	Report	Torres (yellow card) 64'; Coquelin (yellow card) 74'	Stadium: Ciutat de València; Attendance: 14,908; Referee: Adrián Cordero Vega

10 April 2022 31	Levante	2–3	Barcelona	Valencia
21:00 CEST (UTC+2)	Campaña (yellow card) 11'; Morales 52' (pen.); Roger (penalty missed) 56'; Melero 83' (pen.)	Report	Aubameyang 59'; Pedri 63'; Araújo (yellow card) 87'; L. de Jong 90+2'	Stadium: Ciutat de València; Attendance: 20,785; Referee: José Luis Munuera Montero

17 April 2022 32	Granada	1–4	Levante	Granada
14:00 CEST (UTC+2)	Díaz (yellow card) 35'; Sánchez (yellow card) 44' (yellow-red card) 54'; Petrović (yellow card) 69'; Machís (yellow card) 74'; Collado 90+2'	Report	Gómez 17'; Radoja (yellow card) 40'; Morales 56' (pen.); Malsa 77'; Cárdenas (yellow card) 79'; Soldado 90+5'	Stadium: Nuevo Los Cármenes; Attendance: 15,323; Referee: Valentín Pizarro Gómez

21 April 2022 33	Levante	2–3	Sevilla	Valencia
19:00 CEST (UTC+2)	Morales 22' (pen.), (penalty missed) 71'; Pepelu (yellow card) 57'; Soldado 87'	Report	Jordán (yellow card) 4'; Corona 14', 27'; Navas (yellow card) 22'; Montiel (yellow card) 63'; Acuña (yellow card) 69'; Koundé 81'; Mir (yellow card) 90+5'	Stadium: Ciutat de València; Attendance: 18,107; Referee: Isidro Díaz de Mera Escuderos

30 April 2022 34	Valencia	1–1	Levante	Valencia
18:30 CEST (UTC+2)	Guedes (yellow card) 23'; Duro 27'; Gayà (red card) 31'; Alderete (yellow card) 38'; Mamardashvili (yellow card) 70'; Guillamón (yellow card) 84'	Report	Radoja (yellow card) 36'; Son (yellow card) 38'; Duarte 81', (yellow card) 85'	Stadium: Mestalla; Attendance: 35,099; Referee: Jorge Figueroa Vázquez

6 May 2022 35	Levante	2–1	Real Sociedad	Valencia
21:00 CEST (UTC+2)	Pier (yellow card) 52'; Miramón 53'; Postigo (yellow card) 89'; Melero 90' (pen.)	Report	Isak (yellow card) 38'; Silva 66'; Rico (yellow card) 87'; Le Normand (yellow card) 89'	Stadium: Ciutat de València; Attendance: 17,278; Referee: Javier Alberola Rojas

12 May 2022 36	Real Madrid	6–0	Levante	Madrid
21:30 CEST (UTC+2)	Mendy 13'; Benzema 19'; Rodrygo 34'; Camavinga (yellow card) 43'; Vinícius 45', 68', 83'; Modrić (yellow card) 69'	Report	Roger (yellow card) 65'	Stadium: Santiago Bernabéu; Attendance: 38,421; Referee: Adrián Cordero Vega

15 May 2022 37	Levante	3–1	Alavés	Valencia
19:30 CEST (UTC+2)	Campaña (yellow card) 17'; Morales (yellow card) 29', (goal) 90+5'; Saracchi (yellow card) 35'; Duarte 53'; Malsa (yellow card) 58'; Roger 75'; Son (yellow card) 81'; Soldado (yellow card) 86'; Vezo (yellow card) 90'; Coke (yellow card) 90+3'	Report	Joselu 36'; Pons (yellow card) 38'; Miguel (yellow card) 54'; Méndez (yellow card) 71'; Escalante (yellow card) 86'; Tenas (yellow card) 89'; Lejeune (yellow card) 90+6'	Stadium: Ciutat de València; Attendance: 12,438; Referee: Guillermo Cuadra Fernández

20 May 2022 38	Rayo Vallecano	2–4	Levante	Madrid
21:00 CEST (UTC+2)	Á. García 18'; Guardiola 61' (pen.)	Report	Melero 26', 45+1'; Roger 44'; Saracchi (yellow card) 55'; Postigo (yellow card) 75'; Coke 76'; Vezo (yellow card) 86'	Stadium: Campo de Fútbol de Vallecas; Attendance: 8,446; Referee: Mario Melero López

=== Copa del Rey ===
2 December 2021 First round	Huracán Melilla	0–8	Levante	Melilla
19:00 CET (UTC+1)		Report	Soldado 2', 22'; Blesa 29', 30', 63'; Malsa 51'; Gómez 52', 58'	Stadium: Álvarez Claro (Note: Huracán Melilla played its game at Álvarez Claro, in Melilla instead of their regular stadium La Espiguera as it does not meet the requirements established by the Royal Spanish Football Federation.); Referee: Mario Melero López

14 December 2021 Second round	Alcoyano	3–3 (a.e.t.) (3–1 p)	Levante	Alcoy
21:00 CET (UTC+1)	Mourad 5', 44'; Blanco 55'	Report	Gómez 23', 68'; Soldado 61'	Stadium: Estadio El Collao; Referee: Jorge Figueroa Vázquez
	Penalties
	Lillo (penalty missed); Andy (penalty scored); García (penalty scored); Blanco (penalty scored)		(penalty missed) Pepelu; (penalty scored) Morales; (penalty missed) Roger; (penalty missed) Bardhi

== Statistics ==
=== Goalscorers ===
As of 21 April 2022

Rank	Player	La Liga	Copa del Rey	Total
1	(Spain) José Luis Morales	12	0	12
2	(Spain) Dani Gómez	4	4	8
3	(Spain) Roberto Soldado	3	3	6
4	(Spain) Roger Martí	5	0	5
5	(Spain) Jorge de Frutos	4	0	4
5	(Spain) Gonzalo Melero	4	0	4
7	(North Macedonia) Enis Bardhi	3	0	3
7	(Spain) Álex Blesa	0	3	3
9	(Spain) José Campaña	2	0	2
9	(Martinique) Mickaël Malsa	1	1	2
11	(Germany) Shkodran Mustafi	1	0	1
11	(Spain) Róber Pier	1	0	1
11	(Spain) Son	1	0	1
Own goals		0	0	0
Total		41	11	52
