= Pepelu =

Spanish footballer (born 1998)

Personal information
- Full name: José Luis García Vayá
- Date of birth: 11 August 1998 (age 28)
- Place of birth: Dénia, Spain
- Height: 1.85 m (6 ft 1 in)
- Position: Central midfielder

Team information
- Current team: Valencia
- Number: 18

Youth career
- Dénia
- 2012–2014: Levante

Senior career*
Years	Team	Apps	(Gls)
2014–2019	Levante B	90	(14)
2015–2023	Levante	72	(1)
2017–2018	→ Hércules (loan)	30	(0)
2019–2020	→ Tondela (loan)	33	(2)
2020–2021	→ Vitória Guimarães (loan)	30	(1)
2023–	Valencia	102	(11)

International career^{‡}
2014–2015	Spain U17	15	(2)
2016	Spain U18	2	(0)
2016–2017	Spain U19	7	(0)
2016	Spain U20	6	(0)
2019	Spain U21	3	(0)
- * Club domestic league appearances and goals as of 27 May 2026 ‡ National team caps and goals as of 8 July 2023

José Luis García Vayá (born 11 August 1998), commonly known as Pepelu, is a Spanish professional footballer who plays as a central midfielder for La Liga club Valencia.

== Club career ==
=== Levante ===
==== Early years ====
Born in Dénia, Alicante, Valencian Community, Pepelu joined Levante's youth setup in 2012, after starting it out at Dénia. On 24 June 2014, while still a youth, he renewed his contract until 2021, and made his senior debut with the reserve team on 7 September, coming on as a half-time substitute in a Tercera División 1–1 home draw against Castellón.

Pepelu helped the B-team in their promotion to Segunda División B at the end of the season, and scored his first senior goal on 30 August 2015, netting his team's second in a 2–0 home win over Llosetense. On 15 December, he made his first team debut by replacing Juanfran in a 2–1 Copa del Rey away loss against Espanyol.

==== Loan to Hércules ====
In August 2017, after Levante's B-side suffered relegation to the fourth tier, Pepelu was loaned to Hércules in the third division, for one season. A regular starter, he contributed with 32 matches overall during the campaign.

==== Loan to Tondela ====
Upon returning from loan, Pepelu was a regular starter for the B-side also in the third division, scoring a career-best six goals during the 2018–19 campaign. On 26 July 2019, he moved abroad for the first time in his career after agreeing to a one-year loan deal with Primeira Liga side Tondela.

Pepelu scored his first professional goal on 7 December 2019, netting the opener in a 3–2 away success over Famalicão. The following 26 July, he saved the club from relegation with a late penalty 2–1 winner at Moreirense on the final day.

==== Loan to Vitória SC ====
On 8 September 2020, Pepelu remained in Portugal for a further campaign, after agreeing to a one-year loan deal with Vitória SC. He was also a first-choice for the club, as they narrowly missed out a continental spot.

==== Breakthrough ====
Upon returning to Levante in July 2021, Pepelu made his La Liga debut on 11 September, replacing Pablo Martínez late into a 1–1 home draw against Rayo Vallecano. He established himself as a regular starter for the side under manager Alessio Lisci, but was unable to prevent the club's relegation to Segunda División.

In June 2022, Pepelu signed a new ten-year contract with Levante running until the summer of 2032. He scored his first goal for the club on 29 April 2023, netting the opener in a 2–0 home win over Deportivo Alavés.

=== Valencia ===
On 8 July 2023, Pepelu moved to cross-town rivals Valencia CF in the top tier, for €5 million. The player signed a five-year contract, with a release clause of €100 million.

== International career ==
After representing Spain at under-17, under-18, under-19, under-20 and under-21 levels, Pepelu received his first call-up to the full side on 2 September 2024, for two 2024–25 UEFA Nations League matches against Serbia and Switzerland.

== Career statistics ==
=== Club ===
As of match played 17 August 2024

Appearances and goals by club, season and competition
Club	Season	League			National cup (Note: Includes Copa del Rey and Taça de Portugal)		League cup (Note: Includes Taça da Liga)		Continental		Other		Total	
Club	Season	Division	Apps	Goals	Apps	Goals	Apps	Goals	Apps	Goals	Apps	Goals	Apps	Goals
Levante B	2015–16	Segunda División B	30	4	—		—		—		—		30	4
Levante B	2016–17	Segunda División B	29	4	—		—		—		2 (Note: Appearances in Segunda División B relegation play-offs)	0	31	4
Levante B	2018–19	Segunda División B	31	6	—		—		—		—		31	6
Levante B	Total		90	14	—		—		—		2	0	92	14
Levante	2015–16	La Liga	0	0	1	0	—		—		—		1	0
Levante	2021–22	La Liga	29	0	1	0	—		—		—		30	0
Levante	2022–23	Segunda División	43	1	4	0	—		—		—		47	1
Levante	Total		72	1	6	0	—		—		—		78	1
Hércules (loan)	2017–18	Segunda División B	30	0	2	0	—		—		—		32	0
Tondela (loan)	2019–20	Primeira Liga	33	2	0	0	1	0	—		—		34	2
Vitória SC (loan)	2020–21	Primeira Liga	30	1	2	0	1	0	—		—		33	1
Valencia	2023–24	La Liga	37	7	2	1	—		—		—		39	8
Valencia	2024–25	La Liga	1	0	0	0	—		—		—		1	0
Valencia	Total		38	7	2	1	—		—		—		40	8
Career Total			293	25	12	1	2	0	—		2	0	309	26
