= Valencia derby =

Association football rivalry

Derbi del Turia
- Other names: Derbi Valenciano
- Location: Valencia
- Teams: Levante; Valencia
- First meeting: 28 September 1963; La Liga; Valencia 5–3 Levante
- Latest meeting: 15 February 2026; La Liga; Levante 0–2 Valencia
- Stadiums: Ciutat de València (Levante); Mestalla (Valencia)

Statistics
- Total meetings: 40
- Most wins: Valencia (23)
- All-time series: Levante: 8 Drawn: 9 Valencia: 23
- Largest victory: Levante 1–5 Valencia (11 May 2008)

The Valencian derby (Spanish: Derbi Valenciano) or most commonly known as "Derbi del Turia", is the name given to any association football match contested between Levante and Valencia, the two main clubs in the city of Valencia, Spain.

== History ==
The first match between Levante and Valencia was played in 1920, during the Regional Championship of Valencia. Both teams did not meet in La Liga until 1963.

Levante has not won an official match in Mestalla since 1937. However, the granotas won a friendly match in Valencia's stadium in 1995.

== Head-to-head statistics ==
As of 15 February 2026

Official games
Competition	Pld	LUD	D	VCF	LG	VG
La Liga	34	8	9	17	35	62
Copa del Rey	6	0	0	6	3	17
Total	40	8	9	23	38	79

== All-time results ==
=== La Liga ===
No.	Season	Date	R.	Home team	Score	Away team	Att.	Levante scorers	Valencia scorers
1	1963–64	28 September 1963	3	Valencia	5–3	Levante		Torrents (35), Wanderley (74), Camarasa (87)	Guillot (3, 38, 75), Suco (25), Roberto Gil (32)
2	1963–64	26 January 1964	18	Levante	1–0	Valencia		Domínguez (10)	
3	1964–65	19 September 1964	2	Valencia	2–0	Levante			Paquito (8), Héctor Núñez (83)
4	1964–65	10 January 1965	17	Levante	2–1	Valencia		Domínguez (34), Rivera (43)	Waldo (88)
5	2004–05	8 January 2005	18	Valencia	2–1	Levante	50,000	Congo (73)	Baraja (55), Mista (59)
6	2004–05	22 May 2005	37	Levante	0–0	Valencia	25,000		
7	2006–07	13 January 2007	18	Valencia	3–0	Levante	52,200		Hugo Viana (52), Morientes (56), Ayala (79)
8	2006–07	9 June 2007	37	Levante	4–2	Valencia	25,000	Riga (2, 48), Salva (10), Courtois (74)	Joaquín (15), Baraja (87)
9	2007–08	6 January 2008	18	Valencia	0–0	Levante	35,000		
10	2007–08	11 May 2008	37	Levante	1–5	Valencia	13,418	José Serrano (31)	Villa (13, 29, 66), Mata (35), Angulo (65)
11	2010–11	9 January 2011	18	Levante	0–1	Valencia	15,000		Mata (82)
12	2010–11	15 May 2011	37	Valencia	0–0	Levante	41,000		
13	2011–12	5 November 2011	12	Levante	0–2	Valencia	19,000		Javi Venta (o.g. 30), Tino Costa (49)
14	2011–12	1 April 2012	31	Valencia	1–1	Levante	45,000	Koné (53)	Jonas (34)
15	2012–13	7 October 2012	7	Levante	1–0	Valencia	20,060	Martins (21)	
16	2012–13	2 March 2013	26	Valencia	2–2	Levante	39,000	Iborra (16), Barkero (88)	Jonas (26), Soldado (44)
17	2013–14	4 January 2014	18	Valencia	2–0	Levante	33,000		Piatti (41), Feghouli (73)
18	2013–14	10 May 2014	37	Levante	2–0	Valencia	19,846	Ángel (70), Ivanschitz (81)	
19	2014–15	23 November 2014	12	Levante	2–1	Valencia	22,012	Casadesús (57), Morales (74)	Parejo (73)
20	2014–15	13 April 2015	31	Valencia	3–0	Levante	46,955		Alcácer (15), Feghouli (35), Negredo (89)
21	2015–16	31 October 2015	10	Valencia	3–0	Levante	39,147		Alcácer (64), Feghouli (72), Bakkali (79)
22	2015–16	13 March 2016	29	Levante	1–0	Valencia	17,688	Rossi (64)	
23	2017–18	16 September 2017	4	Levante	1–1	Valencia	21,770	Bardhi (41)	Rodrigo (31)
24	2017–18	11 February 2018	23	Valencia	3–1	Levante	38,280	Postigo (18)	Santi Mina (17), Vietto (65), Parejo (89)
25	2018–19	2 September 2018	3	Levante	2–2	Valencia	24,073	Roger (13, 33)	Cheryshev (16), Parejo (52)
26	2018–19	14 April 2019	32	Valencia	3–1	Levante	42,220	Soler (o.g. 56)	Santi Mina (2, 63), Guedes (57)
27	2019–20	7 December 2019	16	Levante	2–4	Valencia	22,265	Roger (11, 20)	Roger (o.g. 45+3), Gameiro (57, 59), Torres (88)
28	2019–20	12 June 2020	28	Valencia	1–1	Levante	0 (Note: Match played behind closed doors due to the COVID-19 pandemic.)	Melero (90+8 pen.)	Rodrigo (90)
29	2020–21	13 September 2020	1	Valencia	4–2	Levante	0	Morales (1, 36)	Gabriel (12), Gómez (39), Vallejo (75, 90+4)
30	2020–21	12 March 2021	27	Levante	1–0	Valencia	0	Roger (18)	
31	2021–22	20 December 2021	18	Levante	3–4	Valencia	18,851	Campaña (21), Roger (24), Bardhi (90+1)	Guedes (44, 85), Soler (50 pen., 72)
32	2021–22	30 April 2022	34	Valencia	1–1	Levante	35,099	Duarte (81)	Duro (27)
33	2025–26	21 November 2025	13	Valencia	1–0	Levante	46,302		Duro (79)
34	2025–26	15 February 2026	24	Levante	0–2	Valencia	22,967		Ramazani (64), Sadiq (84)

=== Copa del Rey ===
No.	Season	Date	R.	Home team	Score	Away team	Att.	Levante scorers	Valencia scorers
1	1984–85	7 November 1984	R2	Levante	1–4	Valencia		Claudio (55)	Subirats (3), Fernando (20, 60), Palonés (80)
2	1984–85	28 November 1984	R2	Valencia	2–1	Levante		Bernabéu (51)	Sixto (2), Fernando (36)
3	1998–99	20 January 1999	R16	Levante	0–3	Valencia			Rubén Navarro (5, 63), Mendieta (85)
4	1998–99	3 February 1999	R16	Valencia	1–0	Levante			Angloma (86)
5	2011–12	19 January 2012	QF	Valencia	4–1	Levante	39,000	Koné (36)	Jonas (24), Soldado (30), Piatti (44), Tino Costa (89)
6	2011–12	26 January 2012	QF	Levante	0–3	Valencia	12,100		Aduriz (25), Piatti (29, 85)

== Derby in women's football ==
In the 2016–17 season, both teams played in their main stadium registering an attendance of 8,122 spectators at the Ciutat de València and 17,011 at Mestalla.
