= Rúben Vezo =

Portuguese footballer (born 1994)

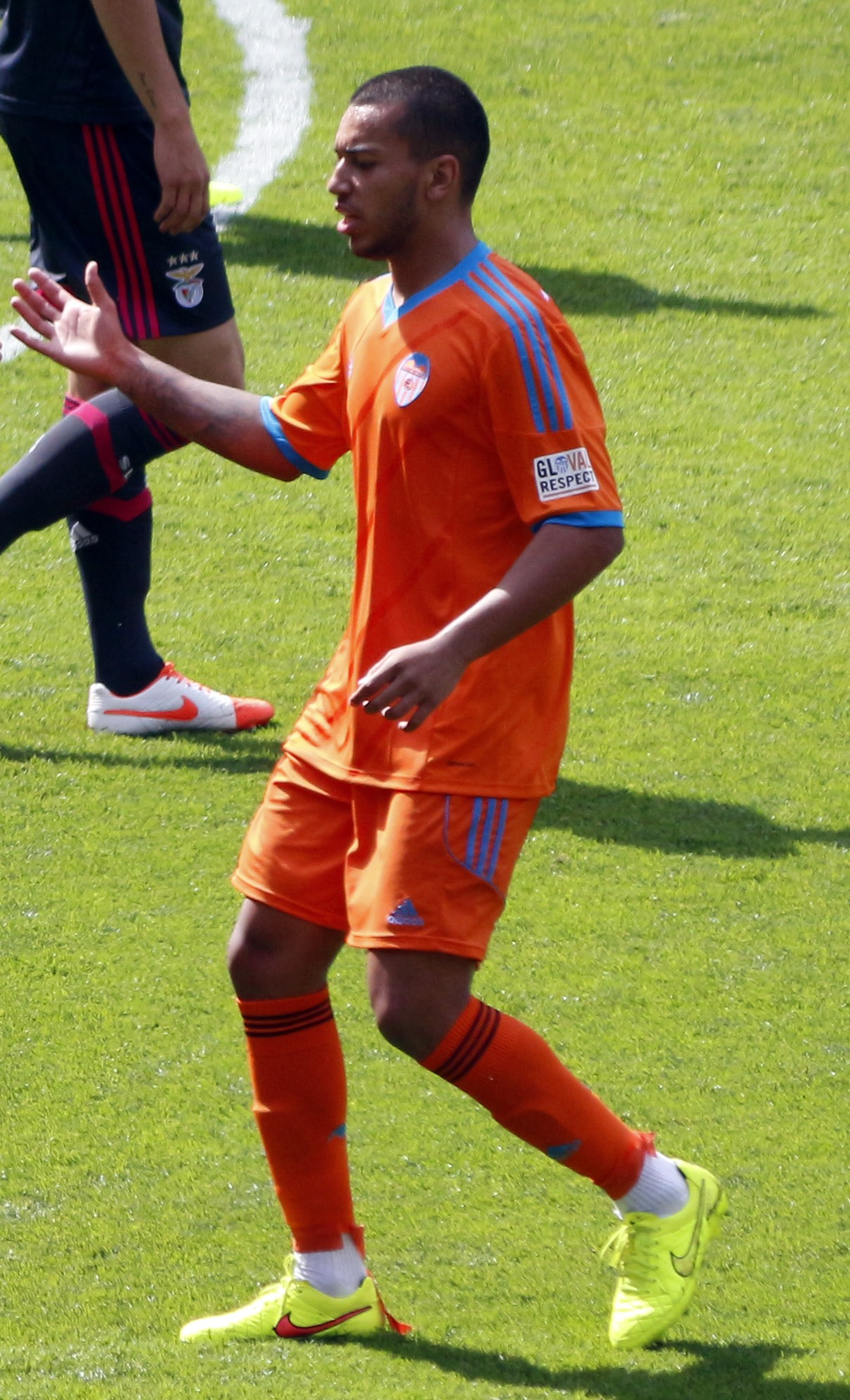
- Vezo with Valencia in 2014

Personal information
- Full name: Rúben Miguel Nunes Vezo
- Date of birth: 25 April 1994 (age 32)
- Place of birth: Setúbal, Portugal
- Height: 1.82 m (6 ft 0 in)
- Position: Defender

Youth career
- 2003–2005: Pelezinhos
- 2005–2013: Vitória Setúbal

Senior career*
Years	Team	Apps	(Gls)
2013	Vitória Setúbal	12	(0)
2014–2019	Valencia	54	(1)
2016–2017	→ Granada (loan)	18	(0)
2019	→ Levante (loan)	15	(2)
2019–2024	Levante	139	(2)
2024–2026	Olympiacos	2	(0)
2024–2025	→ Eyüpspor (loan)	26	(0)

International career
2013	Portugal U19	1	(0)
2014	Portugal U20	5	(1)
2014–2015	Portugal U21	5	(2)
- * Club domestic league appearances and goals as of 15:44, 14 June 2025 (UTC)

Rúben Miguel Nunes Vezo (born 25 April 1994) is a Portuguese professional footballer who plays as a central defender or a right-back.

After starting his career at Vitória de Setúbal in the Primeira Liga, he spent several years in Spain's La Liga with Valencia, Granada and Levante, making 180 appearances in the competition.

== Club career ==
=== Vitória Setúbal ===
Born in Setúbal to a Cape Verdean father and a Portuguese mother, Vezo joined local Vitória Futebol Clube's youth system at the age of 11. He was promoted to the first team for the 2013–14 season, and on 18 August made his Primeira Liga debut, starting in a 1–3 home loss against FC Porto.

During his short spell, Vezo featured the full 90 minutes in all the league matches he appeared in, save for the last five minutes of a 4–1 win at Vitória S.C. where he was sent off, and 34 against F.C. Arouca (1–0 home victory) for the same reason.

=== Valencia ===
On 4 November 2013, Vezo signed a four-year contract with Valencia CF for a reported fee of €1.5 million, with the move being made effective in the January transfer window. He made his La Liga debut on 8 February 2014, playing the last nine minutes in a 5–0 home defeat of Real Betis. Fifteen days later, profiting from suspension to compatriot Ricardo Costa, he started and finished the match against Granada CF also at the Mestalla Stadium, and scored his first goal as a professional from a free kick taken by Dani Parejo to help the hosts come from behind in the 90th minute and win it 2–1; in the process, he became the Spanish club's youngest ever foreigner to achieve that feat.

In 2015–16, Vezo took part in his first European campaigns in the UEFA Champions League and UEFA Europa League. He was dismissed on 24 November in a 2–0 group stage loss away to FC Zenit Saint Petersburg in the former for a foul on Oleg Shatov; following the drop into the latter, he scored the final goal of a 10–0 aggregate win over SK Rapid Wien in the last 32 for Gary Neville's team.

Vezo joined Granada of the same league on 31 August 2016, in a season-long loan. He played 19 times as the Andalusians were relegated, and he was sent off on his second appearance in a 2–2 draw at Betis on 16 September.

In 2018–19, Vezo played only four league games in his last half-season at the Mestalla Stadium, but contributed five matches in the Copa del Rey as the competition was won.

=== Levante ===
On 29 January 2019, Vezo moved across the city to Levante UD also in a temporary deal. Four days later, he made his debut in a goalless draw at home to Getafe CF; his first goal came in a 2–2 draw as RCD Espanyol visited the Estadi Ciutat de València on 21 April, and two weeks later another strike in a 4–1 victory over Rayo Vallecano all but secured survival at the opponents' expense. On 1 July, he agreed to a permanent five-year contract, for a club record €6 million with the first €5 million paid up front.

Vezo had to play in goal for the last minutes of the home fixture with Real Madrid on 22 August 2021, after Aitor Fernández was sent off and manager Paco López had already brought all five replacements in. He conceded no goals in a 3–3 home draw.

=== Olympiacos ===
On 1 February 2024, Vezo was transferred to Olympiacos F.C. of Super League Greece, joining a host of compatriots including manager Carlos Carvalhal. For the following season, he was loaned to Süper Lig side Eyüpspor.

== International career ==
Vezo earned his first cap for the Portugal under-21 side on 5 March 2014 – one month shy of his 20th birthday – playing the full 90 minutes in a 2–0 home win against Macedonia for the 2015 UEFA European Championship qualifiers. He scored his first goal at that level in the same competition, on 14 October, helping defeat the Netherlands 5–4 in the play-offs, in Paços de Ferreira (7–4 on aggregate).

== Career statistics ==
As of 10 February 2026

Appearances and goals by club, season and competition
Club	Season	League			Cup (Note: Includes Taça de Portugal, Taça da Liga, Copa del Rey, Greek Football Cup, Turkish Cup)		Continental		Other		Total	
Club	Season	Division	Apps	Goals	Apps	Goals	Apps	Goals	Apps	Goals	Apps	Goals
Vitória Setúbal	2013–14	Primeira Liga	12	0	3	1	—		—		15	1
Valencia	2013–14	La Liga	8	1	0	0	0	0	—		8	1
Valencia	2014–15	La Liga	7	0	3	0	—		—		10	0
Valencia	2015–16	La Liga	15	0	6	0	6 (Note: Three appearances in UEFA Champions League, three appearances and one goal in UEFA Europa League)	1	—		27	1
Valencia	2016–17	La Liga	1	0	0	0	—		—		1	0
Valencia	2017–18	La Liga	19	0	7	1	—		—		26	1
Valencia	2018–19	La Liga	4	0	5	0	3 (Note: Appearances in UEFA Champions League)	0	—		12	0
Valencia	Total		54	1	21	1	9	1	–		84	3
Granada (loan)	2016–17	La Liga	18	0	1	0	—		—		19	0
Levante (loan)	2018–19	La Liga	15	2	0	0	—		—		15	2
Levante	2019–20	La Liga	29	1	1	0	—		—		30	1
Levante	2020–21	La Liga	32	1	5	0	—		—		37	1
Levante	2021–22	La Liga	32	0	0	0	—		—		32	0
Levante	2022–23	Segunda División	27	0	1	0	—		3 (Note: Appearances in La Liga play-offs)	0	31	0
Levante	2023–24	Segunda División	19	0	1	0	—		—		20	0
Levante	Total		154	4	8	0	—		3	0	165	4
Olympiacos	2023–24	Super League Greece	2	0	0	0	—		3 (Note: Appearances in Super League Greece playoffs)	0	5	0
Olympiacos	2025–26	Super League Greece	0	0	3	0	—		—		3	0
Olympiacos	Total		2	0	3	0	—		3	0	8	0
Eyüpspor (loan)	2024–25	Süper Lig	26	0	2	0	—		—		28	0
Career total			266	5	37	2	9	1	7	0	319	8

== Honours ==
Valencia

- Copa del Rey: 2018–19
