= Marcelo Saracchi =

Uruguayan footballer (born 1998)

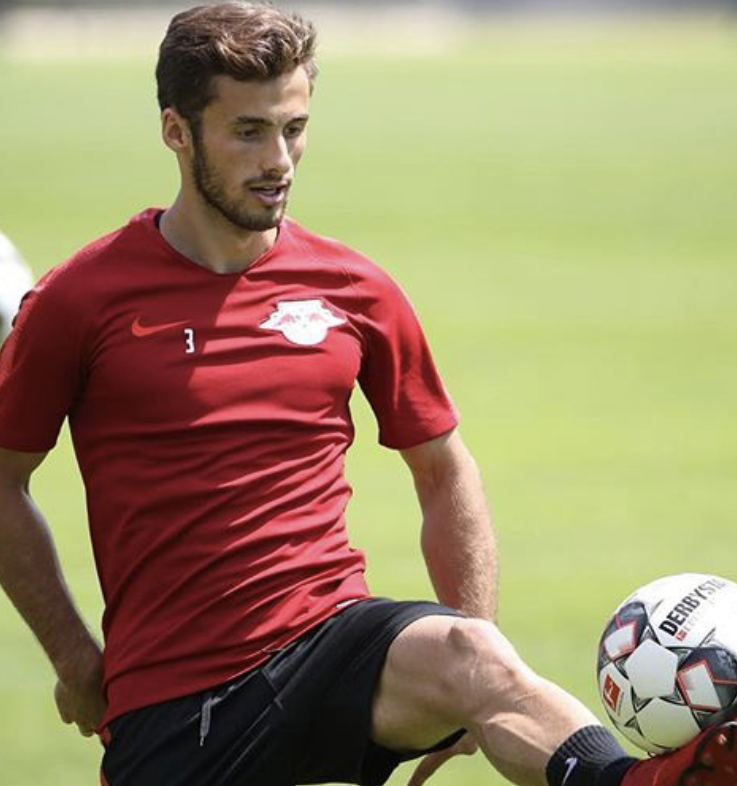
- Saracchi with RB Leipzig in 2018

Personal information
- Full name: Marcelo Josemir Saracchi Pintos
- Date of birth: 23 April 1998 (age 28)
- Place of birth: Paysandú, Uruguay
- Height: 1.72 m (5 ft 8 in)
- Position: Left-back

Team information
- Current team: Houston Dynamo
- Number: 4

Youth career
- 2008–2012: Progreso Paysandú
- 2012–2015: Danubio

Senior career*
Years	Team	Apps	(Gls)
2015–2017	Danubio	54	(3)
2017–2018	River Plate	19	(0)
2018–2021	RB Leipzig	13	(1)
2020–2021	→ Galatasaray (loan)	41	(2)
2022–2023	Levante	29	(0)
2023–2026	Boca Juniors	35	(3)
2025–2026	→ Celtic (loan)	19	(1)
2026–	Houston Dynamo	0	(0)

International career^{‡}
2012–2013	Uruguay U15	15	(3)
2014–2015	Uruguay U17	24	(4)
2015–2017	Uruguay U20	24	(0)
2018–	Uruguay	11	(0)
Medal record
Men's football
Representing Uruguay
South American U-20 Championship
Winner	2017
- * Club domestic league appearances and goals as of 17:05, 16 May 2025 (UTC) ‡ National team caps and goals as of 13 October 2025

Marcelo Josemir Saracchi Pintos (Italian: [saˈrakki]; born 23 April 1998) is a Uruguayan professional footballer who plays as a left-back for Major League Soccer club Houston Dynamo, and the Uruguay national team.

== Club career ==
=== Early career ===
Born in Paysandú, Saracchi joined hometown club Progreso Paysandú at the age of ten, spending five years in their youth system. Saracchi then joined the youth ranks of Danubio.

=== Danubio ===
In July 2015, Saracchi was moved to the Danubio first team. He was included in the matchday squad for the first time on 12 August for Danubio's Copa Sudamericana match against Universidad Católica. During that match, Saracchi was subbed on for Ignacio González in the 77th minute, but his competitive debut for the club was cut short when he was subbed off five minutes later following Alejandro Peña's second yellow card and subsequent sending off.

The following weekend, Saracchi made his Primera División debut, making another substitute appearance, this time replacing Leandro Sosa in the 63rd minute of a 2-0 away victory over Juventud. A month later, Saracchi made his first start for the club in a 1-1 draw against Sud América in league play.

After breaking into the first team throughout the 2015–16 season, Saracchi scored his first goal for the club, in the 77th minute of a 4-1 defeat to Montevideo Wanderers late in the Clausura tournament. It would be his only goal of the season. Saracchi would go on to make 57 appearances for the club, 54 in the league and three in the Copa Sudamericana, alongside netting against El Tanque Sisley and Montevideo Wanderers again for a total of three goals with Danubio.

=== River Plate ===
In August 2017, alterations of foreign player requirements in the Argentine Primera División paved the way for Saracchi to sign with River Plate, with the Argentine club paying around €2 million for his services.

Saracchi made his debut for the club on 10 September 2017, playing the entirety of a 3-1 league victory over Banfield. Despite spending only one season with the club, Saracchi won several trophies, appearing against Defensa y Justicia, Atlanta, and Atlético Tucumán as River Plate won the Copa Argentina, and then against Boca Juniors in the Supercopa Argentina.

In March 2018, interest in Saracchi was reported from Italian clubs Inter Milan and Juventus, although no formal bid was submitted from either club. Throughout 31 appearances in all competitions for River Plate, Saracchi scored once, the opener in River Plate's 4-1 victory over Atlanta.

=== RB Leipzig ===
In the summer of 2018, Saracchi moved to German club RB Leipzig for a transfer fee of around €12 million. He made his competitive debut for the club on 26 July 2018, registering 88 minutes before being replaced by Nordi Mukiele in a 4-0 victory over BK Häcken during Europa League qualification.

During his first two seasons with Leipzig, Saracchi was mainly a fringe player, making 13 league appearances, eight of which were starts. He scored his first goal for the club on 21 September 2019, netting in the 83rd minute of a 3-0 away victory over Werder Bremen. His contract was terminated on 19 December 2021 by mutual consent.

=== Galatasaray ===
In January 2020, Saracchi moved on a year-and-a-half long loan to Turkish club Galatasaray, arriving alongside Henry Onyekuru. Saracchi made his debut for the club on 10 January 2020 in a friendly against Altay. He made his competitive debut for the club a little over a week later, playing the entirety of a 2-1 home victory over Denizlispor. Saracchi registered his first assist for the club in that match, providing the pass for Emre Akbaba's 26th-minute opener.

=== Levante ===
On 22 February 2022, Saracchi signed with Levante in Spain until 2024, with an option to extend for three more seasons.

=== Boca Juniors ===
Saracci signed for Boca Juniors during 2023. He was loaned to Scottish club Celtic in August 2025.

== International career ==
Saracchi is a former Uruguay youth international and was part of the under-20 team which won the 2017 South American U-20 Championship.

Saracchi made his senior international debut on 12 October 2018, coming on as an 84th-minute substitute for Diego Laxalt in a 2-1 friendly defeat against South Korea. Saracchi was included in Uruguay's squad for the 2019 Copa América, but remained as an unused substitute in Uruguay's all four matches.

In September 2024, Saracchi was called up to the Uruguay national team for the first time in five years.

== Personal life ==
Born in Uruguay, Saracchi is of Italian descent.

== Career statistics ==
=== Club ===
As of 23 May 2026

Appearances and goals by club, season and competition
Club	Season	League			National cup (Note: Includes Copa Argentina, DFB-Pokal, Turkish Cup, Copa del Rey, Scottish Cup)		League cup (Note: Includes Scottish League Cup)		Continental		Other		Total	
Club	Season	Division	Apps	Goals	Apps	Goals	Apps	Goals	Apps	Goals	Apps	Goals	Apps	Goals
Danubio	2015–16	Uruguayan Primera División	30	1	—		—		2 (Note: Appearance(s) in Copa Sudamericana)	0	—		32	1
Danubio	2016	Uruguayan Primera División	14	0	—		—		—		—		14	0
Danubio	2017	Uruguayan Primera División	10	2	—		—		1	0	—		11	2
Danubio	Total		54	3	—		—		3	0	—		57	3
River Plate	2017–18	Argentine Primera División	19	0	3	1	—		7 (Note: Appearances in Copa Libertadores)	0	1 (Note: Appearance in Supercopa Argentina.)	0	30	1
RB Leipzig	2018–19	Bundesliga	9	0	1	0	—		10 (Note: Appearances in UEFA Europa League)	0	—		20	0
RB Leipzig	2019–20	Bundesliga	4	1	1	0	—		2 (Note: Appearances in UEFA Champions League)	0	—		7	1
RB Leipzig	Total		13	1	2	0	—		12	0	—		27	1
Galatasaray (loan)	2019–20	Süper Lig	14	2	1	0	—		—		—		15	2
Galatasaray (loan)	2020–21	Süper Lig	27	0	1	0	—		1	0	—		29	0
Galatasaray (loan)	Total		41	2	2	0	—		1	0	—		44	2
Levante	2021–22	La Liga	4	0	—		—		—		—		4	0
Levante	2022–23	Segunda División	25	0	3	0	—		—		3 (Note: Appearances in Segunda División play-offs)	0	31	0
Levante	Total		29	0	3	0	—		—		3	0	35	0
Boca Juniors	2023	Argentine Primera División	11	0	2	0	—		3	0	—		16	0
Boca Juniors	2024	Argentine Primera División	17	2	3	0	—		5	1	—		25	3
Boca Juniors	2025	Argentine Primera División	7	1	1	0	—		2	0	1 (Note: Appearance in FIFA Club World Cup)	0	11	1
Boca Juniors	Total		35	3	6	0	—		10	0	1	0	52	4
Celtic (loan)	2025–26	Scottish Premiership	19	1	3	0	1	0	4	0	—		27	1
Career total			210	10	19	1	1	0	37	3	5	0	271	12

=== International ===
As of match played 13 October 2025

Appearances and goals by national team and year
National team	Year	Apps	Goals
Uruguay	2018	2	0
Uruguay	2019	2	0
Uruguay	2024	5	0
Uruguay	2025	2	0
Total		11	0

== Honours ==
River Plate

- Copa Argentina: 2016–17
- Supercopa Argentina: 2017

RB Leipzig

- DFB-Pokal runner-up: 2018–19

Celtic

- Scottish Premiership: 2025–26
- Scottish Cup: 2025–26

Uruguay U20

- South American U-20 Championship: 2017
