= Daniel Cárdenas =

Spanish footballer (born 1997)

Dani Cárdenas
Personal information
- Full name: Daniel Cárdenas Lindez
- Date of birth: 28 March 1997 (age 29)
- Place of birth: Terrassa, Spain
- Height: 1.86 m (6 ft 1 in)
- Position: Goalkeeper

Team information
- Current team: Rayo Vallecano
- Number: 1

Youth career
- Terrassa
- Maurina Egara
- 2007–2008: Barcelona
- 2008–2013: Jàbac Terrassa
- 2013–2014: Espanyol
- 2014–2016: Levante

Senior career*
Years	Team	Apps	(Gls)
2016–2020	Levante B	73	(0)
2020–2023	Levante	66	(0)
2023–	Rayo Vallecano	14	(0)

International career^{‡}
2022–	Catalonia	3	(0)
- * Club domestic league appearances and goals as of 19:31, 5 September 2026 (UTC) ‡ National team caps and goals as of 16:23, 23 August 2025 (UTC)

Daniel "Dani" Cárdenas Lindez (born 28 March 1997) is a Spanish professional footballer who plays as a goalkeeper for La Liga club Rayo Vallecano.

== Club career ==
=== Levante ===
Born in Terrassa, Barcelona, Catalonia, Cárdenas joined Levante UD's youth academy in January 2014 after notably representing FC Barcelona and RCD Espanyol. He was promoted to Levante's reserves for the 2016–17 season, and made his senior debut on 20 August 2016 by starting in a 1–0 Segunda División B home loss against CD Atlético Baleares.

Initially third choice behind Daniel Sotres and Koke Vegas, Cardenas became a regular starter after the former left and the latter was promoted to the main squad. On 12 March 2020, he renewed his contract until 2022.

On 27 November 2020, as Aitor was injured, Cárdenas made his first-team – and La Liga – debut, playing the full 90 minutes in a 1–1 away draw against Real Valladolid. On 21 March 2022, already established in the first team, he agreed to an extension until 2025.

=== Rayo Vallecano ===
On 18 August 2023, Cárdenas signed a four-year deal with top-tier club Rayo Vallecano. He was a backup for the vast majority of his spell.

== Career statistics ==
As of match played 5 September 2026

Appearances and goals by club, season and competition
Club	Season	League			National cup		Europe		Other		Total	
Club	Season	Division	Apps	Goals	Apps	Goals	Apps	Goals	Apps	Goals	Apps	Goals
Levante B	2015–16	Segunda División B	0	0	—		—		—		1	0
Levante B	2016–17	Segunda División B	2	0	—		—		—		2	0
Levante B	2017–18	Tercera División	26	0	—		—		4	0	30	0
Levante B	2018–19	Segunda División B	21	0	—		—		—		21	0
Levante B	2019–20	Segunda División B	20	0	—		—		—		20	0
Levante B	2020–21	Segunda División B	4	0	—		—		—		4	0
Levante B	Total		73	0	—		—		4	0	77	0
Levante	2019–20	La Liga	0	0	0	0	—		—		0	0
Levante	2020–21	La Liga	8	0	5	0	—		—		13	0
Levante	2021–22	La Liga	24	0	0	0	—		—		24	0
Levante	2022–23	Segunda División	34	0	0	0	—		0	0	34	0
Levante	2023–24	Segunda División	0	0	—		—		—		0	0
Levante	Total		66	0	5	0	—		0	0	71	0
Rayo Vallecano	2023–24	La Liga	1	0	4	0	—		—		5	0
Rayo Vallecano	2024–25	La Liga	6	0	4	0	—		—		10	0
Rayo Vallecano	2025–26	La Liga	4	0	4	0	0	0	—		8	0
Rayo Vallecano	2026–27	La Liga	3	0	0	0	—		—		3	0
Rayo Vallecano	Total		14	0	12	0	0	0	—		26	0
Career total			153	0	17	0	0	0	4	0	174	0

== Honours ==
Rayo Vallecano

- UEFA Conference League runner-up: 2025–26
