= Suco (footballer) =

Spanish footballer (1938–2026)

Personal information
- Full name: Andrés Parada Alvite
- Date of birth: 27 September 1938
- Place of birth: Ribeira, Galicia, Spain
- Date of death: 24 July 2026 (aged 87)
- Place of death: Ferrol, Spain
- Height: 1.74 m (5 ft 9 in)
- Positions: Forward; left winger

Youth career
- –1956: Atlético Ribeira

Senior career*
Years	Team	Apps	(Gls)
1956–1959	Racing Ferrol	71	(21)
1959–1961	Barcelona	9	(1)
1961–1963	Racing Santander	47	(6)
1963–1966	Valencia	28	(2)
1966–1968	Deportivo La Coruña	23	(0)
1969	Arosa	12	(2)
Total		190	(32)
- * Club domestic league appearances and goals

Andrés Parada Alvite (27 September 1938 – 24 July 2026), commonly known as Suco, was a Spanish footballer who played as a forward and left winger.

== Career ==
Suco started his football career with local side Atlético Ribeira, before joining Segunda División side Racing Ferrol in 1956, at the age of 18. In November 1959, he joined Barcelona, spending two seasons there before joining Racing Santander.

In 1963, at the age of 25, he joined Valencia. His first goal for the club came on the second matchday of the 1963–64 La Liga season, where he scored in a 5–3 win against Levante, the first ever Valencia derby at the Mestalla Stadium. Additionally, he helped them reach the Inter-Cities Fairs Cup final in the 1963–64 season, where he was sent off in the 89th minute as Valencia lost 2–1 against Real Zaragoza. In the following seasons, he began to gradually lose his place in the starting lineup to Manuel Polinario, eventually leading him to join Deportivo La Coruña, where he retired in 1968.

== Personal life and death ==
Suco's brother, José Manuel Parada Alvite, was also a footballer who primarily played for Celta Vigo. To differentiate the two brothers, José Manuel was known as Suco II. In 2012, both brothers were honoured by having a sports field renamed after them in Ribeira.

On 24 July 2026, Suco was admitted to a hospital in Ferrol with a lung infection. He died later that day, at the age of 87.

== Honours ==
Barcelona

- La Liga: 1959–60
- Inter-Cities Fairs Cup: 1958–60

Valencia

- Inter-Cities Fairs Cup runner-up: 1963–64

Deportivo La Coruña

- Segunda División: 1967–68
