= Shkodran Mustafi =

German football player

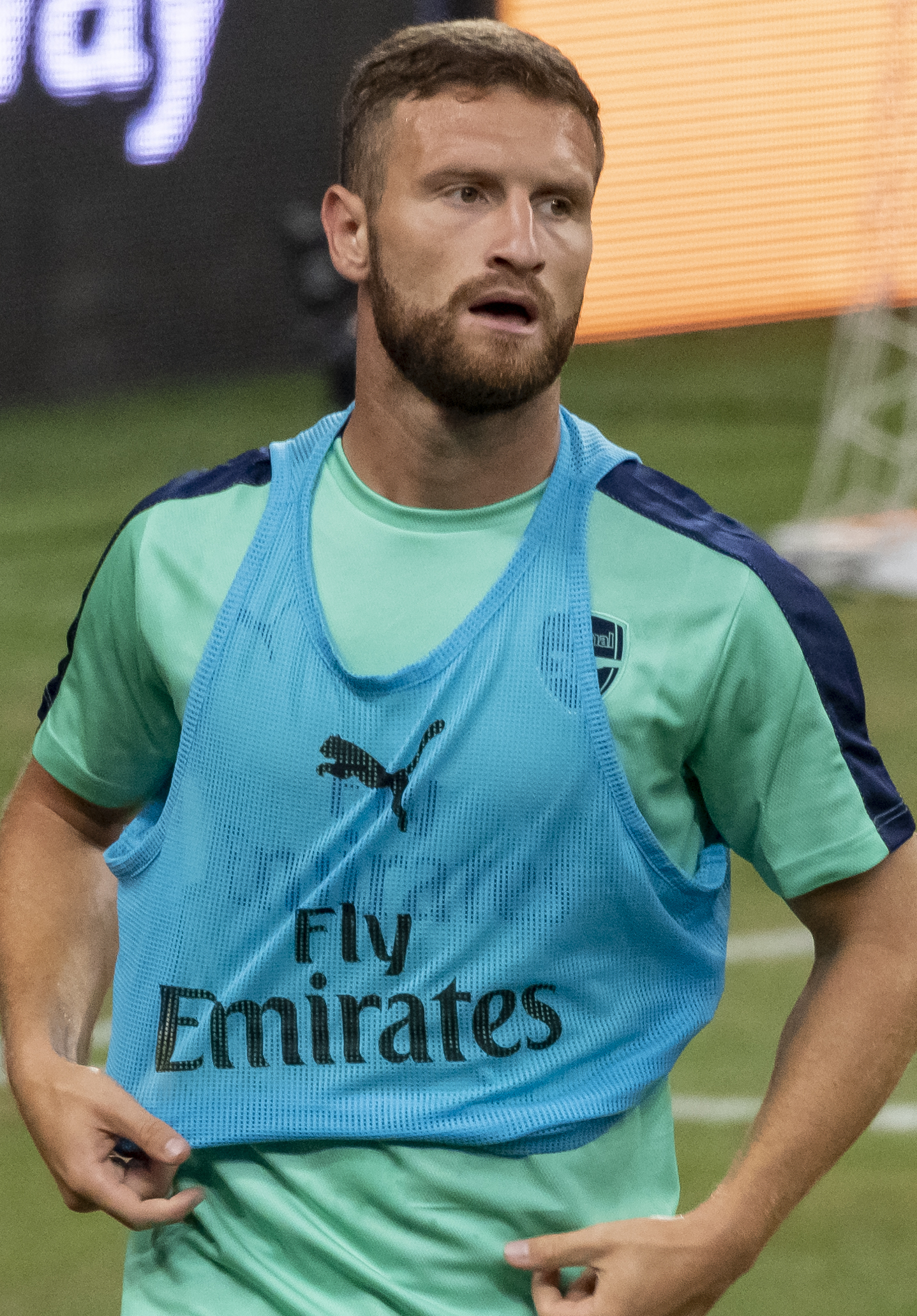
- Mustafi training with Arsenal in 2018

Personal information
- Full name: Shkodran Mustafi
- Date of birth: 17 April 1992 (age 34)
- Place of birth: Bad Hersfeld, Germany
- Height: 1.84 m (6 ft 0 in)
- Position: Centre-back

Youth career
- 2000–2004: 1. FV Bebra
- 2004–2006: SV Rotenburg
- 2006–2009: Hamburger SV
- 2009: Everton

Senior career*
Years	Team	Apps	(Gls)
2009–2012	Everton	0	(0)
2012–2014	Sampdoria	51	(1)
2014–2016	Valencia	64	(6)
2016–2021	Arsenal	102	(7)
2021	Schalke 04	13	(1)
2021–2023	Levante	14	(2)
Total		244	(17)

International career
2008	Germany U16	5	(0)
2008–2009	Germany U17	24	(5)
2009–2010	Germany U18	6	(1)
2010–2011	Germany U19	9	(2)
2011–2013	Germany U20	10	(3)
2013	Germany U21	7	(0)
2014–2017	Germany	20	(2)
Medal record
Men's football
Representing Germany
FIFA World Cup
Winner	2014 Brazil
FIFA Confederations Cup
Winner	2017 Russia
UEFA European Under-17 Championship
Winner	2009 Germany
- * Club domestic league appearances and goals

Shkodran Mustafi (German pronunciation: [ˈʃkoːdʁan mʊsˈtafiː]; born 17 April 1992) is a German former professional footballer who played as a centre-back.

Mustafi began his career in the youth ranks of Hamburger SV and English club Everton, where he made one substitute appearance for them before leaving to Sampdoria in January 2012. He signed a five-year deal at Valencia in August 2014, and moved to Arsenal for a reported £35 million two years later. He played 151 games for Arsenal. He later returned to the Bundesliga with Schalke 04 and La Liga with Levante.

Mustafi made his full international debut against Poland on 13 May 2014, and was part of the German teams that won the 2014 FIFA World Cup and the 2017 FIFA Confederations Cup, also competing at UEFA Euro 2016.

== Club career ==
=== Early career ===
Mustafi was born in Bad Hersfeld, Hesse, to a Macedonian Albanian family originally from Gostivar in the former Yugoslavia. Mustafi started his career in the youth system of local 1. FC Bebra, and had a stint with SV Rotenburg, before joining Hamburger SV's youth setup in 2006.

=== Everton ===
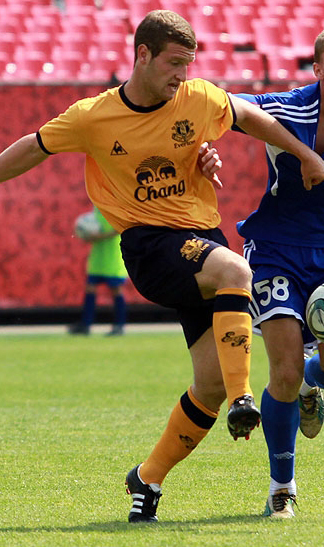
Mustafi playing for Everton in 2011

In May 2009, Mustafi joined Everton, initially assigned to the academy team. He later stated that "Goodison Park feels like home", after turning down offers from Manchester City and Newcastle United.

Mustafi made his competitive debut on 16 December 2009, replacing Tony Hibbert in the 75th minute of a 0–1 home loss against BATE Borisov, for the season's UEFA Europa League. He was also named on the bench for the Premier League matches against Arsenal and Manchester City in January. Mustafi only appeared on the bench nine times in the following two campaigns, but never played in any further matches.

=== Sampdoria ===
In January 2012, Mustafi moved to Italian Serie B side Sampdoria, on a free transfer. Mustafi was released by Everton after he asked manager David Moyes to allow him to move on for more game time.

Mustafi made his Samp debut on 26 May 2012, starting and playing the full 90 minutes of a 1–3 loss at Varese. It was his maiden appearance in the competition, as Sampdoria returned to Serie A at first attempt. He made his debut in the Italian top flight on 11 November 2012, starting in a 0–2 loss at Palermo.

On 26 October of the following year he scored his first professional goal, netting the game's only against Atalanta at the Stadio Luigi Ferraris.

=== Valencia ===
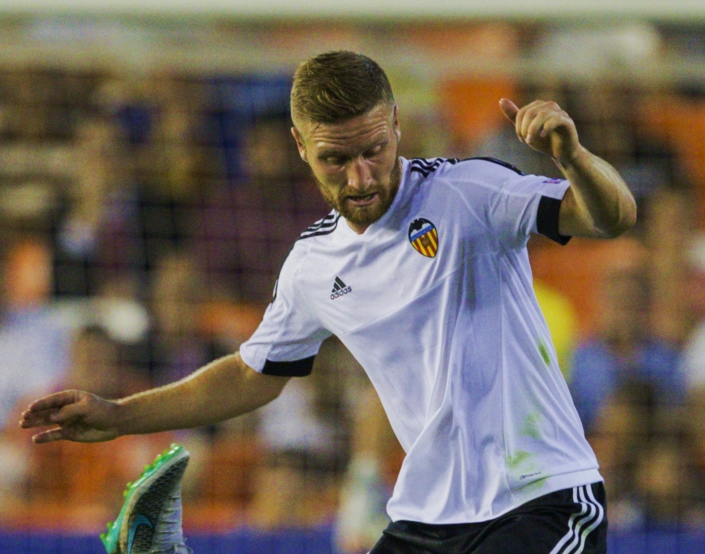
Mustafi playing for Valencia in 2015

On 7 August 2014, Mustafi signed a five-year deal with La Liga's Valencia CF, for an undisclosed fee, rumoured to be €8 million. He debuted for his new team on 25 September, against Córdoba in an eventual 3–0 home win. A month later, he scored his first goal for the team, opening a 3–1 home win over Elche. In Valencia's next match on 2 November, against another regional rival, Villarreal, Mustafi scored a brace in a 3–1 away win to put Valencia into second place in the league.

On 3 March 2016, Mustafi received a straight red card in the first half of Valencia's 7–0 loss at Barcelona in the first leg of the Copa del Rey semi-final, after conceding a penalty with a foul on Lionel Messi. He then pleaded for the team's forgiveness by the Che supporters.

=== Arsenal ===
On 30 August 2016, Mustafi joined English club Arsenal for an undisclosed fee, reported to be in excess of £35 million. He made his debut in Arsenal's 2–1 Premier League win over Southampton at the Emirates Stadium on 10 September. Mustafi beat Bacary Sagna's record unbeaten start of 17 games at the club in Arsenal's 3–3 draw against Bournemouth with his 18th game without defeat. On 22 January 2017, he scored his first goal for the club in a home 2–1 league win over Burnley. Because of illness, he missed Arsenal's 2–1 win over Chelsea in the 2017 FA Cup Final on 27 May.

Mustafi was in the starting 11 against Manchester City in the EFL Cup final on 25 February 2018. He made a mistake in the 18th minute that allowed Sergio Agüero to score the first goal of a 3–0 City win. On 29 May 2019, he was an unused substitute in the Europa League final against Chelsea, in which Arsenal were defeated 4–1. He missed the 2020 FA Cup Final against the same team due to a hamstring injury, and Arsenal won 2–1.

On 29 August 2020, Mustafi missed Arsenal's victory over Liverpool in the 2020 FA Community Shield because of injury. The following 1 February, Arsenal and Mustafi reached a mutual agreement to terminate his contract. During his tenure at Arsenal, he developed a reputation for errors.

=== Schalke 04 ===
On 1 February 2021, Mustafi joined German side Schalke 04 on a permanent transfer. He was reportedly signed as the replacement for Liverpool-bound Ozan Kabak on a six-month contract. He made his debut five days later in a 0–3 defeat against RB Leipzig in the Bundesliga. He played 13 games for the team from Gelsenkirchen, scoring in a 4–2 loss at Hoffenheim on 8 May.

=== Levante ===
On 2 September 2021, Mustafi returned to the city of Valencia, joining La Liga club Levante on a two-year deal. He suffered from several injuries and made only 11 appearances as the team suffered relegation; this included three months with a knee injury from December to March 2022, followed by a quadriceps strain between April and July. His one goal was the early opener in a 3–1 loss at Real Betis on 28 November 2021. He was confirmed to have been released by the club on 10 July 2023 after his contract expired and retired on 25 June 2024 to become the assistant coach of the German U17 national team, having not played senior football after leaving Levante. In the four top-flights of Italy, England, Spain and Germany he amassed 240 league matches in his career.

== International career ==
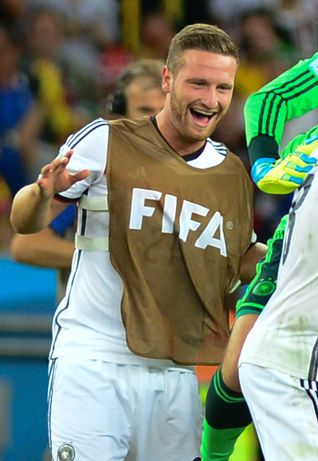
Mustafi celebrating Germany's victory in the 2014 FIFA World Cup

Eligible to represent Germany, North Macedonia and Albania, Mustafi played for his country of birth at youth level; with the under-17 team he won the 2009 UEFA European Under-17 Championship.

Joachim Löw called up Mustafi to the Germany national squad for a friendly match against Chile in February 2014, he made his full international debut in a friendly match against Poland, playing the full 90 minutes of a goalless draw at the Volksparkstadion on 13 May 2014.

Mustafi was selected in Germany's 30-man provisional squad before the 2014 FIFA World Cup by Löw. After initially not making the squad for the finals, he was subsequently nominated as the replacement for the injured Marco Reus. He appeared as a substitute in Germany's opening World Cup game against Portugal, coming on in the 73rd minute in place of Mats Hummels to win his second cap.

In the team's second match, he again came on as a substitute, replacing Jérôme Boateng at half time against Ghana. He was selected to start at right-back in Germany's round of 16 match against Algeria, but was substituted in the 70th minute for Sami Khedira due to an injury in his left thigh. It was later confirmed by the DFB that Mustafi would take no further part in the World Cup due to the torn fibre muscle.

Mustafi was also called up for UEFA Euro 2016. In Germany's opening match against Ukraine in Lille, he headed a delivery from Toni Kroos to open a 2–0 win. That was his first goal for Germany. He was also part of their squad that won the 2017 FIFA Confederations Cup in Russia, but was omitted from the following year's World Cup in the same country due to a poor season with Arsenal. So his 20th international appearance from October 2017 was eventually his last one.

During this time, Mustafi was a part of a collaboration between the German Football Association and The LEGO Group, who in May 2016 released a Europe-exclusive collectible minifigure series, with Mustafi featured as the sixth of sixteen minifigures in the collection.

== Personal life ==
Mustafi is an ethnic Albanian from Gostivar, North Macedonia. He was born and grew up in Germany and holds both Albanian and German citizenship. Mustafi is a practising Muslim. In July 2016, he married Albanian model Vjosa Kaba in Gostivar. The couple have a daughter, Noemi (born in July 2017), and a son, Amar (born in January 2019).

== Career statistics ==
=== Club ===
Appearances and goals by club, season and competition
Club	Season	League			National cup (Note: Includes Coppa Italia, Copa del Rey, FA Cup)		League cup (Note: Includes EFL Cup)		Europe		Total	
Club	Season	Division	Apps	Goals	Apps	Goals	Apps	Goals	Apps	Goals	Apps	Goals
Everton	2009–10	Premier League	0	0	0	0	0	0	1 (Note: Appearance(s) in UEFA Europa League)	0	1	0
Everton	2010–11	Premier League	0	0	0	0	0	0	—		0	0
Everton	2011–12	Premier League	0	0	0	0	0	0	—		0	0
Everton	Total		0	0	0	0	0	0	1	0	1	0
Sampdoria	2011–12	Serie B	1	0	—		—		—		1	0
Sampdoria	2012–13	Serie A	17	0	0	0	—		—		17	0
Sampdoria	2013–14	Serie A	33	1	2	0	—		—		35	1
Sampdoria	Total		51	1	2	0	—		—		53	1
Valencia	2014–15	La Liga	33	4	3	0	—		—		36	4
Valencia	2015–16	La Liga	30	2	4	0	—		10 (Note: Seven appearances in UEFA Champions League, three appearances in UEFA Europa League)	0	44	2
Valencia	2016–17	La Liga	1	0	—		—		—		1	0
Valencia	Total		64	6	7	0	—		10	0	81	6
Arsenal	2016–17	Premier League	26	2	4	0	0	0	7 (Note: Appearances in UEFA Champions League)	0	37	2
Arsenal	2017–18	Premier League	27	3	0	0	3	0	8	0	38	3
Arsenal	2018–19	Premier League	31	2	1	0	2	0	6	1	40	3
Arsenal	2019–20	Premier League	15	0	3	0	2	0	7	1	27	1
Arsenal	2020–21	Premier League	3	0	0	0	1	0	5	0	9	0
Arsenal	Total		102	7	8	0	8	0	33	2	151	9
Schalke 04	2020–21	Bundesliga	13	1	0	0	—		—		13	1
Levante	2021–22	La Liga	11	1	1	0	—		—		12	1
Levante	2022–23	Segunda División	3	1	0	0	—		—		3	1
Levante	Total		14	2	1	0	—		—		15	2
Career total			244	17	18	0	8	0	44	2	314	19

=== International ===
Appearances and goals by national team and year
National team	Year	Apps	Goals
Germany
Germany	2014	6	0
Germany	2015	3	0
Germany	2016	6	1
Germany	2017	5	1
Total		20	2

Germany score listed first, score column indicates score after each Mustafi goal.

List of international goals scored by Shkodran Mustafi
No.	Date	Venue	Cap	Opponent	Score	Result	Competition
1	12 June 2016	Stade Pierre-Mauroy, Lille, France	11	Ukraine	1–0	2–0	UEFA Euro 2016
2	10 June 2017	Stadion Nürnberg, Nuremberg, Germany	16	San Marino	5–0	7–0	2018 FIFA World Cup qualification

== Honours ==
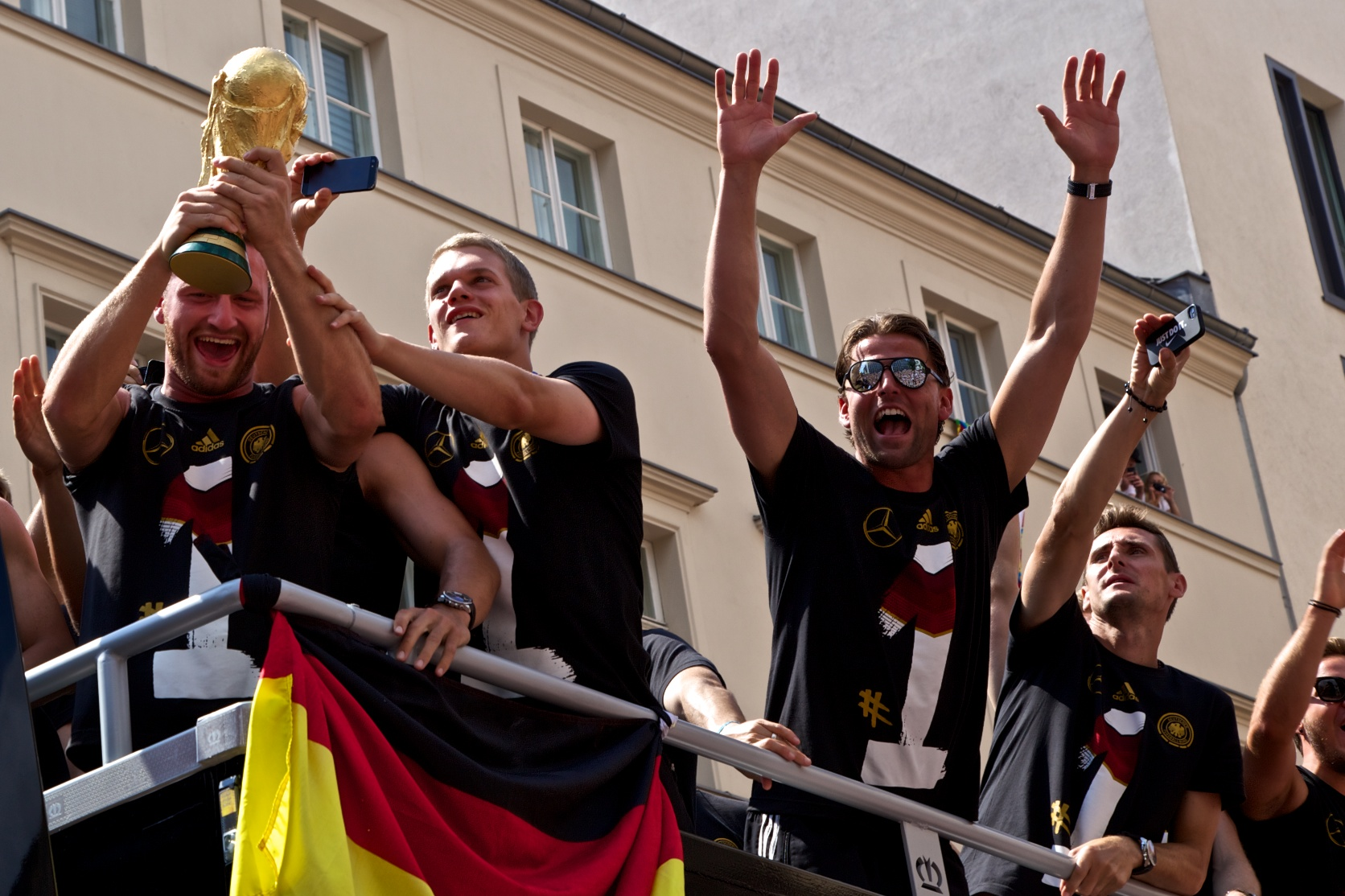
Mustafi holding the FIFA World Cup Trophy at Germany's victory parade in Berlin

Arsenal

- FA Cup: 2016–17, 2019–20
- EFL Cup runner-up: 2017–18
- UEFA Europa League runner-up: 2018–19

Germany U17

- UEFA European Under-17 Championship: 2009

Germany

- FIFA World Cup: 2014
- FIFA Confederations Cup: 2017

Orders

- Silbernes Lorbeerblatt: 2014
