= Mickaël Malsa =

Martinique international footballer (born 1995)

Personal information
- Full name: Mickaël Ramon Vincent Malsa
- Date of birth: 12 October 1995 (age 31)
- Place of birth: Paris, France
- Height: 1.79 m (5 ft 10 in)
- Position: Defensive midfielder

Team information
- Current team: Punjab

Youth career
- –2013: Sochaux

Senior career*
Years	Team	Apps	(Gls)
2013–2015	Sochaux II	27	(4)
2013–2015	Sochaux	9	(0)
2015–2017	Antwerp	23	(2)
2017	Avranches II	5	(0)
2017	Avranches	8	(0)
2017–2019	Fortuna Sittard	5	(0)
2018	→ Platanias (loan)	13	(0)
2018–2019	→ Albacete (loan)	30	(0)
2019–2020	Mirandés	30	(0)
2020–2022	Levante	61	(2)
2022–2023	Valladolid	9	(0)
2023	→ Kasımpaşa (loan)	10	(1)
2024–2025	Wydad AC	5	(1)
2025–2026	Mirandés	3	(0)
2026–	Punjab	0	(0)

International career^{‡}
2014–	Martinique	4	(0)
- * Club domestic league appearances and goals as of 16:48, 29 September 2026 (UTC) ‡ National team caps and goals as of 26 February 2014

Mickaël Ramon Vincent Malsa (born 12 October 1995) is a professional footballer who plays as a midfielder. Born in metropolitan France, he plays for Indian Super League club Punjab & the Martinique national team.

== Club career ==
Born in Paris, Malsa passed the youth ranks of FC Sochaux-Montbéliard. He made his full debut at 8 February 2014 in a 2–0 away defeat against Lille. Two weeks later he featured again in a league game against Valenciennes, which ended into a 2–2 draw.

In January 2015 Malsa moved to Royal Antwerp. After a short spell at US Avranches, he joined Fortuna Sittard in 2017.

On 23 July 2018, Malsa was loaned to Segunda División side Albacete Balompié, for one year. On 3 September of the following year, he joined fellow league team CD Mirandés on a permanent one-year deal.

On 22 July 2020, Malsa agreed to a four-year contract with La Liga side Levante UD. He made his debut in the category on 27 September, in a 3–1 away win over CA Osasuna, and scored his first goal in the top tier the following 18 April, but in a 5–1 home loss against Villarreal CF.

On 12 August 2022, after Levante's relegation, Malsa signed a four-year deal with Real Valladolid in the first division. He left the club on 27 February 2024, and spent a period without a club before joining Moroccan side Wydad AC on 29 January 2025.

Malsa left the Moroccan side in September, and returned to Mirandés on 12 February 2026.

== Career statistics ==
As of 14 January 2023

Appearances and goals by club, season and competition
Club	Season	League			National cup		League cup		Europe		Other		Total	
Club	Season	Division	Apps	Goals	Apps	Goals	Apps	Goals	Apps	Goals	Apps	Goals	Apps	Goals
Sochaux II	2013–14	Ligue 1	4	0	0	0	1	0	—		—		5	0
Sochaux II	2014–15	Ligue 2	5	0	0	0	—		—		—		5	0
Sochaux II	Total		9	0	0	0	1	0	—		—		10	0
Royal Antwerp	2015–16	Belgian Second Division	20	2	1	0	—		—		—		21	2
Royal Antwerp	2016–17	Belgian Second Division	3	0	0	0	—		—		—		3	0
Royal Antwerp	Total		23	2	1	0	—		—		—		24	2
US Avranches	2016–17	CFA	8	0	1	0	—		—		—		9	0
Fortuna Sittard	2017–18	Eerste Divisie	5	0	1	1	—		—		—		6	1
Platanias (loan)	2018–19	Super League Greece	13	0	1	0	—		—		—		14	0
Albacete (loan)	2018–19	Segunda División	30	0	1	0	—		—		1 (Note: Appearance in La Liga play-offs)	0	32	0
Mirandés	2019–20	Segunda División	30	0	7	0	—		—		—		37	0
Levante	2020–21	La Liga	35	1	5	1	—		—		—		40	2
Levante	2021–22	La Liga	26	1	1	1	—		—		—		27	2
Levante	Total		61	2	6	2	—		—		—		67	4
Real Valladolid	2022–23	La Liga	5	0	1	0	—		—		—		6	0
Career total			177	4	18	1	1	0	0	0	1	0	205	7
