= José Campaña =

Spanish footballer (born 1993)

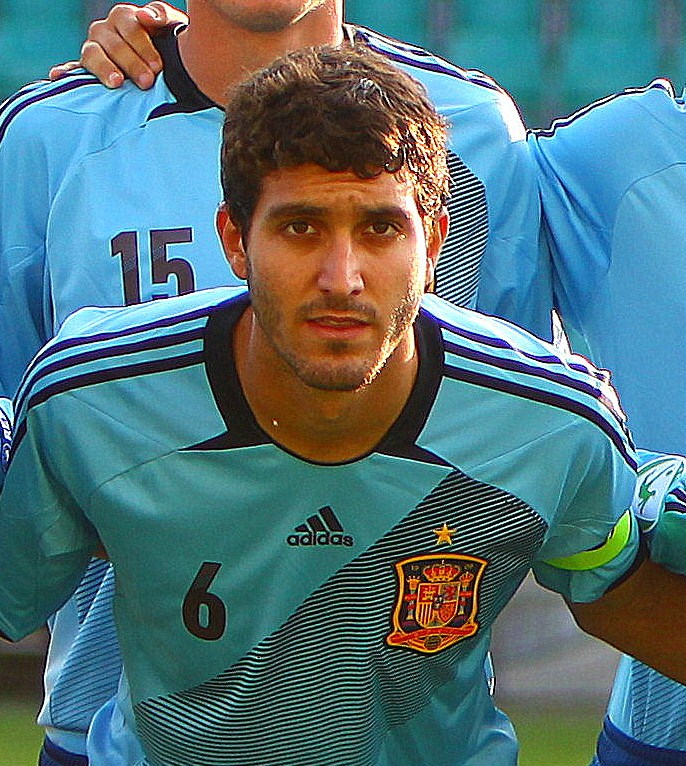
- Campaña with Spain U19 in 2012

Personal information
- Full name: José Ángel Gómez Campaña
- Date of birth: 31 May 1993 (age 33)
- Place of birth: Seville, Spain
- Height: 1.79 m (5 ft 10 in)
- Position: Midfielder

Youth career
- 2000–2009: Sevilla

Senior career*
| Years | Team | Apps | (Gls) |
| 2009–2011 | Sevilla B | 56 | (3) |
| 2011–2013 | Sevilla | 20 | (0) |
| 2013–2014 | Crystal Palace | 6 | (0) |
| 2014 | → Nürnberg (loan) | 10 | (1) |
| 2014–2016 | Sampdoria | 0 | (0) |
| 2014–2015 | → Porto (loan) | 2 | (0) |
| 2014–2015 | → Porto B (loan) | 6 | (0) |
| 2015–2016 | → Alcorcón (loan) | 35 | (3) |
| 2016–2023 | Levante | 197 | (19) |
| 2024–2025 | Las Palmas | 33 | (0) |
| 2026 | Ceuta | 12 | (1) |

International career
| 2009 | Spain U16 | 3 | (2) |
| 2009–2010 | Spain U17 | 12 | (0) |
| 2011 | Spain U18 | 2 | (0) |
| 2011–2012 | Spain U19 | 14 | (1) |
| 2013 | Spain U20 | 7 | (0) |
| 2013–2014 | Spain U21 | 3 | (0) |
| 2020 | Spain | 1 | (0) |
Medal record
Men's football
Representing Spain
UEFA European Under-19 Championship
| Winner | 2011 Romania |
| Winner | 2012 Estonia |
UEFA European Under-17 Championship
| Runner-up | 2010 Lichtenstein |
- * Club domestic league appearances and goals as of 9 June 2026

José Ángel Gómez Campaña (Spanish pronunciation: [xoˈse ˈaŋxel ˈɣomeθ kamˈpaɲa]; born 31 May 1993) is a Spanish professional footballer who plays as a midfielder.

Developed at Sevilla, for whom he appeared in 24 competitive matches, he went on to represent mainly Levante after signing in 2016. He also played for clubs in England, Germany and Portugal.

Campaña won two European Under-19 Championships with Spain. He made his senior debut in 2020.

== Club career ==
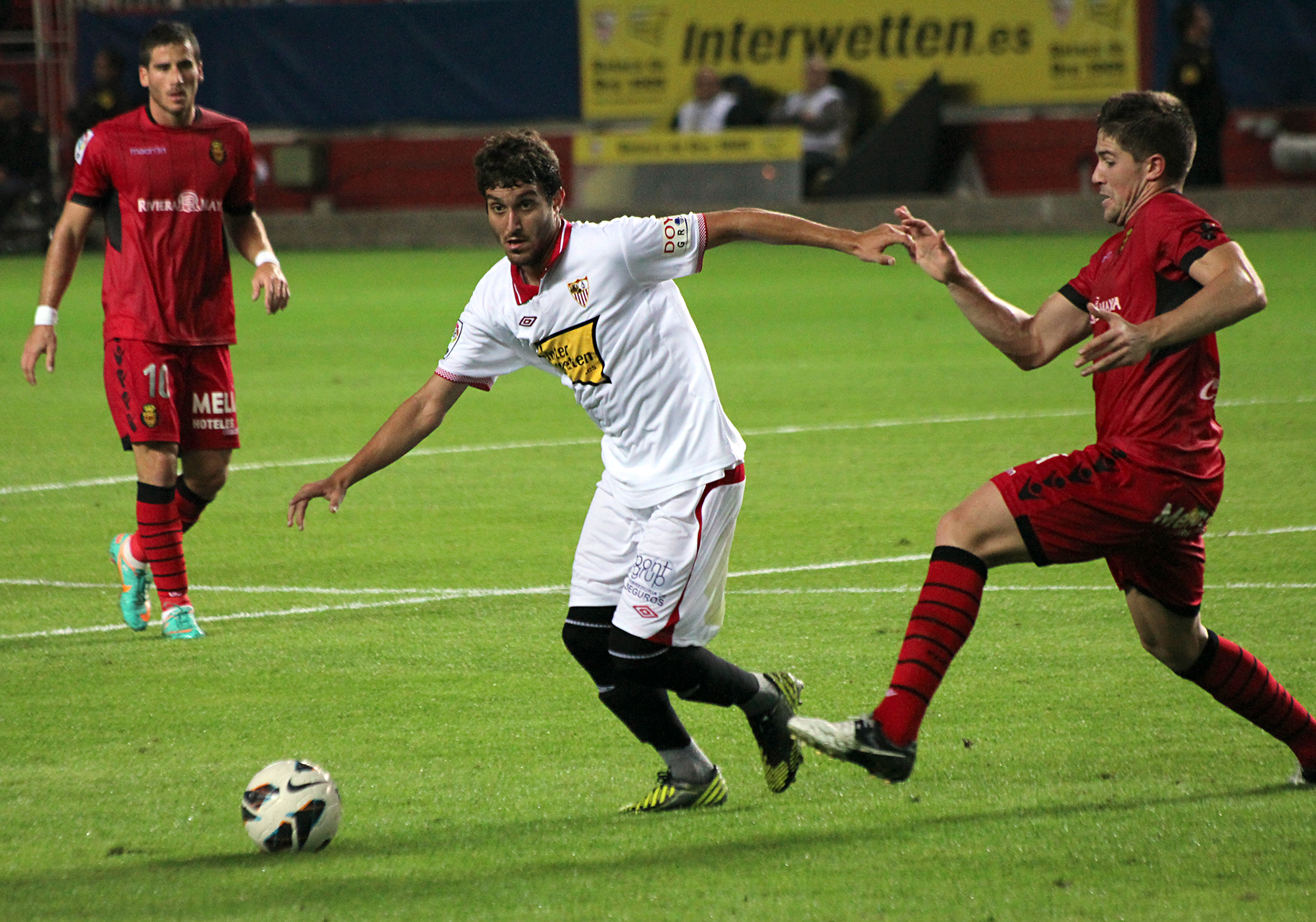
Campaña playing against Mallorca in 2012

=== Sevilla ===
Born in Seville, Andalusia, Campaña reached Sevilla FC's youth system at the age of seven, and made his senior debut at only 16, going on to play in two Segunda División B seasons with the reserves. He was promoted to the main squad by newly appointed coach Marcelino García Toral, for the 2011 pre-season.

Campaña made his debut for the first team on 25 August 2011, playing ten minutes in a 1–1 home draw against Hannover 96 in that season's UEFA Europa League (3–2 aggregate loss), in place of Piotr Trochowski. He made his first La Liga appearance three days later, replacing Manu del Moral in a 2–1 home win over Málaga CF.

In his first year, Campaña appeared in 18 official games to help Sevilla to the ninth place. In March 2013, after undergoing surgery to a fracture in his left foot, he was sidelined for the rest of the campaign.

=== Crystal Palace ===
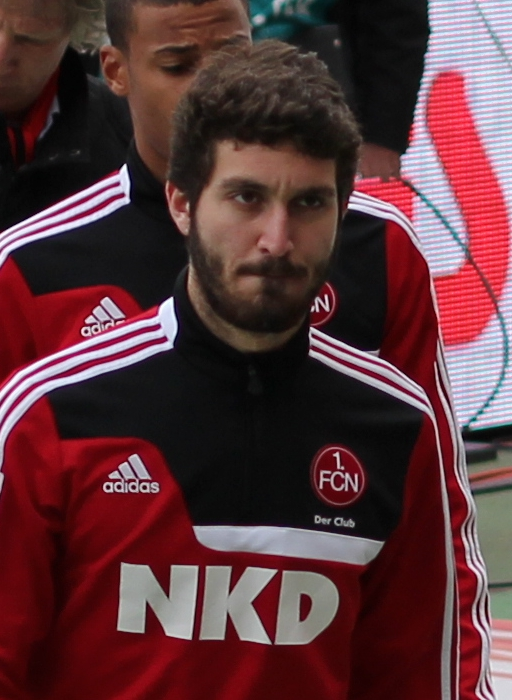
Campaña on loan at Nürnberg in 2014

On 13 July 2013, Premier League club Crystal Palace had a €2 million bid accepted by Sevilla; four days later, after passing his medical, he signed for four years. He made his debut on 24 August, in a 2–1 defeat at Stoke City.

On 31 January 2014, Campaña joined Bundesliga's 1. FC Nürnberg on loan for the remainder of the season with a view to a permanent move. He made his debut in the competition on 16 February, playing the entire second half in a 1–0 away victory over FC Augsburg.

Campaña scored his first goal for the German side on 23 March 2014, but in a 2–5 home loss against Eintracht Frankfurt. He finished the campaign with 591 minutes and five starts, with his team being relegated; he subsequently returned to Palace, being one of the retained players.

=== Sampdoria ===
On 22 July 2014, Campaña joined Serie A side UC Sampdoria for an undisclosed fee. However, on 1 September, he was loaned to Portuguese club FC Porto in a season-long deal, becoming the seventh Spaniard brought in by manager Julen Lopetegui in three months.

Campaña signed with AD Alcorcón on 17 July 2015, on loan for one year.

=== Levante ===
On 11 August 2016, Campaña agreed to a four-year deal with Levante UD, recently relegated to the second tier. He played regularly in his first season, as the Valencians won promotion as champions.

In April 2019, when he had one year remaining on his contract, Campaña extended his link until 2023. He missed the vast majority of 2020–21 due to injury problems.

Campaña ruptured the anterior cruciate ligament of his right knee in a match against UD Las Palmas on 22 April 2023. Despite not being under contract, he was allowed to use the club's facilities during his recovery; during his spell at the Estadi Ciutat de València, he totalled 208 appearances, 19 goals and 30 assists.

=== Las Palmas ===
On 14 February 2024, Campaña signed for Las Palmas until the end of the top-flight campaign, with an option to extend. He left in June 2025 after their relegation.

=== Later career ===
Campaña signed a six-month deal with second-tier AD Ceuta FC on 13 January 2026. He scored on his debut 13 days later, contributing to a 3–1 comeback home win over Cultural y Deportiva Leonesa.

== International career ==
Campaña represented Spain in two UEFA European Under-19 Championship tournaments. In the 2011 edition, hosted in Romania, he played three games, including the final against the Czech Republic.

In 2012, Campaña helped the national side renew their continental supremacy in Estonia by appearing in all five matches and starting in four, three as captain. He missed, however, his penalty shootout attempt in the semi-finals against France (4–2, 3–3 after 120 minutes).

In October 2020, Campaña was first called up to the senior team for matches with Portugal, Switzerland and Germany. He won his first cap against the first opponent, playing the second half of a 0–0 friendly draw in Lisbon.

== Career statistics ==
As of match played on 19 May 2024

Appearances and goals by club, season and competition
| Club | Season | League | | | National cup (Note: Includes Copa del Rey, Taça de Portugal) | | Continental | | Other | | Total | |
| Club | Season | Division | Apps | Goals | Apps | Goals | Apps | Goals | Apps | Goals | Apps | Goals |
|---|---|---|---|---|---|---|---|---|---|---|---|---|
| Sevilla B | 2009–10 | Segunda División B | 22 | 0 | — | | — | | — | | 22 | 0 |
| Sevilla B | 2010–11 | Segunda División B | 34 | 2 | — | | — | | 4 (Note: Appearances in Segunda División B play-offs) | 1 | 38 | 3 |
| Sevilla B | Total | | 56 | 2 | — | | — | | 4 | 1 | 60 | 3 |
| Sevilla | 2010–11 | La Liga | 0 | 0 | 0 | 0 | 0 | 0 | — | | 0 | 0 |
| Sevilla | 2011–12 | La Liga | 15 | 0 | 2 | 0 | 1 (Note: Appearance in UEFA Europa League) | 0 | — | | 18 | 0 |
| Sevilla | 2012–13 | La Liga | 5 | 0 | 1 | 0 | — | | — | | 6 | 0 |
| Sevilla | Total | | 20 | 0 | 3 | 0 | 1 | 0 | — | | 24 | 0 |
| Crystal Palace | 2013–14 | Premier League | 6 | 0 | 0 | 0 | — | | — | | 6 | 0 |
| 1. FC Nürnberg (loan) | 2013–14 | Bundesliga | 10 | 1 | 0 | 0 | — | | — | | 10 | 1 |
| Sampdoria | 2014–15 | Serie A | 0 | 0 | 0 | 0 | — | | — | | 0 | 0 |
| Porto (loan) | 2014–15 | Primeira Liga | 2 | 0 | 4 | 0 | — | | — | | 6 | 0 |
| Porto B (loan) | 2014–15 | Segunda Liga | 6 | 1 | — | | — | | — | | 6 | 1 |
| Alcorcón (loan) | 2015–16 | Segunda División | 35 | 3 | 0 | 0 | — | | — | | 35 | 3 |
| Levante | 2016–17 | Segunda División | 39 | 4 | 1 | 0 | — | | — | | 40 | 4 |
| Levante | 2017–18 | La Liga | 35 | 1 | 3 | 0 | — | | — | | 38 | 1 |
| Levante | 2018–19 | La Liga | 36 | 4 | 3 | 0 | — | | — | | 39 | 4 |
| Levante | 2019–20 | La Liga | 37 | 2 | 3 | 0 | — | | — | | 40 | 2 |
| Levante | 2020–21 | La Liga | 9 | 1 | 0 | 0 | — | | — | | 9 | 1 |
| Levante | 2021–22 | La Liga | 20 | 2 | 0 | 0 | — | | — | | 20 | 2 |
| Levante | 2022–23 | Segunda División | 21 | 5 | 1 | 0 | — | | — | | 22 | 5 |
| Levante | Total | | 197 | 19 | 11 | 0 | — | | — | | 208 | 19 |
| Las Palmas | 2023–24 | La Liga | 8 | 0 | — | | — | | — | | 8 | 0 |
| Career total | | | 340 | 26 | 18 | 0 | 1 | 0 | 4 | 1 | 363 | 27 |

== Honours ==
Levante

- Segunda División: 2016–17

Spain U17

- UEFA European Under-17 Championship runner-up: 2010

Spain U19

- UEFA European Under-19 Championship: 2011, 2012
