= Mario Climent =

Spanish footballer

Personal information
- Full name: Mario Climent Plá
- Date of birth: 30 January 2002 (age 24)
- Place of birth: Jijona, Spain
- Height: 1.76 m (5 ft 9 in)
- Position: Left-back

Team information
- Current team: Arouca
- Number: 21

Youth career
- 2011–2014: Kelme
- 2014–2020: Elche
- 2020–2021: Levante

Senior career*
Years	Team	Apps	(Gls)
2021–2023	Levante B	36	(0)
2021–2022	→ Torrent (loan)	5	(0)
2023–2024	Cartagena B	30	(1)
2024–2025	Mérida	15	(0)
2025–2026	Cádiz	51	(3)
2026–	Arouca	0	(0)
- * Club domestic league appearances and goals as of 9 June 2026

Mario Climent Plá (born 30 January 2002) is a Spanish footballer who plays as a left-back for Portuguese club FC Arouca.

== Career ==
Born in Jijona, Alicante, Valencian Community, Climent represented Kelme CF, Elche CF and Levante UD as a youth. In 2021, after finishing his formation, he was loaned to Tercera División RFEF side Torrent CF, for one year.

On 18 January 2022, Torrent announced Climent's return to Levante, and he was assigned to the reserves in Segunda División RFEF. He established himself as a starter during the 2022–23 season, before moving to another reserve team, FC Cartagena B, on 17 August 2023.

On 28 June 2024, Climent agreed to a contract with Primera Federación side Mérida AD. On 2 January 2025, he joined Cádiz CF in Segunda División on a three-and-a-half-year deal, for a rumoured fee of € 100,000.

Climent made his professional debut on 12 January 2025, coming on as a late substitute for Álex Fernández in a 0–0 home draw against Levante UD. He scored his first professional goal six days later, netting his side's fourth in a 4–1 away routing of CD Eldense.

On 3 August 2026, Climent moved abroad for the first time in his career, signing a two-year contract with Primeira Liga side FC Arouca.
