= Gonzalo Melero =

Spanish footballer

Personal information
- Full name: Gonzalo Julián Melero Manzanares
- Date of birth: 2 January 1994 (age 32)
- Place of birth: Madrid, Spain
- Height: 1.83 m (6 ft 0 in)
- Position: Midfielder

Youth career
- 2000–2004: Zona Norte
- 2004–2013: Real Madrid

Senior career*
Years	Team	Apps	(Gls)
2013–2014	Real Madrid C	37	(7)
2014–2015	Real Madrid B	6	(0)
2015–2016	Ponferradina	38	(1)
2016–2019	Huesca	98	(25)
2019–2022	Levante	85	(16)
2022–2025	Almería	87	(9)
2025–2026	Leganés	33	(5)

International career
2010–2011	Spain U17	3	(0)
- * Club domestic league appearances and goals as of 9 June 2026

Gonzalo Julián Melero Manzanares (born 2 January 1994) is a Spanish professional footballer who plays as a midfielder.

== Club career ==
Born in Madrid, Melero joined Real Madrid's youth setup in 2004, aged ten, after starting out at EF Zona Norte. He made his debut as a senior with the former's C-team in the 2013–14 campaign, being relegated from Segunda División B.

In July 2014 Melero was promoted to the reserves, now also in the third level. On 30 January of the following year, after being sparingly used by manager Zinedine Zidane, he moved to Segunda División's SD Ponferradina in a 2 1/2-year deal.

Melero made his professional debut on 15 February 2015, coming on as a second half substitute for Pablo Infante in a 2–1 home loss against CD Numancia. He scored his first professional goal on 27 February of the following year, but in a 4–2 away loss against Bilbao Athletic.

On 27 July 2016, after Ponfe's relegation, Melero signed a one-year contract with SD Huesca still in the second level. On 10 December, he scored a brace in a 5–2 home routing of UCAM Murcia CF.

Melero was an undisputed starter during the 2017–18 campaign, contributing with a career-best 17 goals as his side achieved promotion to La Liga. He made his debut in the category on 19 August 2018, playing the full 90 minutes in a 2–1 away win against SD Eibar.

On 3 July 2019, after suffering relegation, Melero signed a four-year contract with Levante UD still in the top tier. On 1 September 2022, he agreed to a four-year deal with UD Almería also in the first division.

On 13 August 2025, Melero was transferred to second division side CD Leganés, and signed a two-year contract with the club. On 1 September of the following year, he terminated his link with the club.

== Personal life ==
Melero has two children with the sports journalist Lucía Villalón.

== Career statistics ==
As of 25 May 2024

Appearances and goals by club, season and competition
Club	Season	League			Cup		Other		Total	
Club	Season	Division	Apps	Goals	Apps	Goals	Apps	Goals	Apps	Goals
Real Madrid C	2012–13	Segunda División B	37	7	—		—		37	7
Real Madrid B	2013–14	Segunda División B	6	0	—		—		6	0
Ponferradina	2014–15	Segunda División	10	0	—		—		10	0
Ponferradina	2015–16	Segunda División	28	1	4	0	—		32	1
Ponferradina	Total		38	1	4	0	—		42	1
Huesca	2016–17	Segunda División	36	7	3	0	3	0	42	7
Huesca	2017–18	Segunda División	38	16	0	0	—		38	16
Huesca	2018–19	La Liga	22	2	1	0	—		23	2
Huesca	Total		96	25	4	0	3	0	103	25
Levante	2019–20	La Liga	25	2	2	0	—		27	2
Levante	2020–21	La Liga	29	7	6	1	—		35	8
Levante	2021–22	La Liga	29	7	1	0	—		30	7
Levante	2022–23	Segunda División	2	0	—		—		2	0
Levante	Total		85	16	9	1	—		94	17
Almería	2022–23	La Liga	27	4	1	0	—		28	4
Almería	2023–24	La Liga	28	1	1	0	—		29	1
Almería	Total		55	5	2	0	—		57	5
Career total			317	54	19	1	3	0	339	55
