= Álex Blesa =

Spanish footballer (born 2002)

Personal information
- Full name: Alejandro Blesa Pina
- Date of birth: 15 January 2002 (age 24)
- Place of birth: Valencia, Spain
- Height: 1.80 m (5 ft 11 in)
- Position: Midfielder

Youth career
- 2012–2018: Levante

Senior career*
Years	Team	Apps	(Gls)
2018–2021	Levante B	66	(3)
2020–2024	Levante	4	(0)
2022	→ Castellón (loan)	13	(0)
2022–2023	→ Cultural Leonesa (loan)	29	(3)
2024–2025	Ceuta	10	(1)
2025	Ourense	7	(0)
2025–2026	Teruel	28	(1)

International career^{‡}
2018-2019	Spain U17	10	(1)
- * Club domestic league appearances and goals as of 10 June 2026 ‡ National team caps and goals as of 23 July 2020

Alejandro "Álex" Blesa Pina (born 15 January 2002) is a Spanish footballer who plays as a midfielder.

== Club career ==
Born in Valencia, Blesa played youth football for Levante UD. In August 2018, while still a youth, he signed his first professional contract by agreeing to a deal until 2022.

On 26 August 2018, aged only 16, Blesa made his senior debut with the reserves, starting and playing 81 minutes in a 3–0 Segunda División B home win over CD Teruel. He scored his first goal on 8 September, netting his side's second in a 2–2 away draw against UE Olot.

Blesa made his first team – and La Liga – debut on 19 July 2020, coming on as a late substitute for captain José Luis Morales in a 1–0 home win against Getafe CF. On 24 June 2021, he was promoted to the main squad for the 2021–22 campaign.

On 28 January 2022, after failing to feature in a single league minute during the campaign, Blesa moved to Primera División RFEF side CD Castellón on loan. On 19 August, he moved to fellow league team Cultural y Deportiva Leonesa also in a temporary deal.

On 12 July 2024, Blesa signed with Ceuta in Primera Federación.

== Career statistics ==
=== Club ===
As of 20 July 2020.

Club	Season	League			Cup		Continental		Other		Total	
Club	Season	Division	Apps	Goals	Apps	Goals	Apps	Goals	Apps	Goals	Apps	Goals
Atlético Levante	2018–19	Segunda División B	24	2	–		–		0	0	24	2
Atlético Levante	2019–20	Segunda División B	17	0	–		–		0	0	17	0
Atlético Levante	Career total		41	2	0	0	0	0	0	0	41	2
Levante	2019–20	La Liga	1	0	0	0	–		0	0	1	0
Career total			42	4	0	0	0	0	0	0	42	2
