= Róber Pier =

Spanish footballer (born 1995)

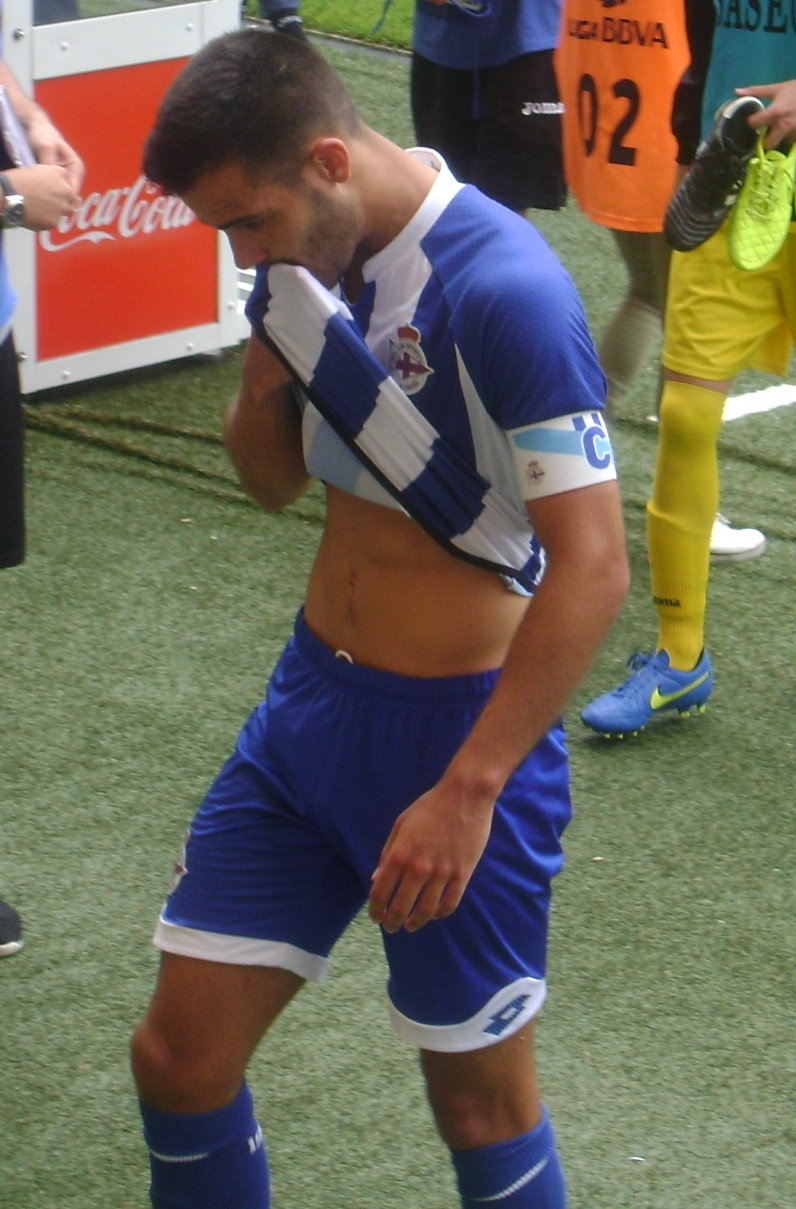
- Pier with Deportivo in 2016

Personal information
- Full name: Roberto Suárez Pier
- Date of birth: 16 February 1995 (age 31)
- Place of birth: Oleiros, Spain
- Height: 1.82 m (6 ft 0 in)
- Position: Centre-back

Team information
- Current team: Cultural Leonesa

Youth career
- Deportivo La Coruña

Senior career*
Years	Team	Apps	(Gls)
2012–2016	Deportivo B	113	(4)
2015–2019	Deportivo La Coruña	2	(0)
2016–2019	→ Levante (loan)	84	(2)
2019–2023	Levante	84	(1)
2023–2025	Sporting Gijón	73	(2)
2025–2026	Atlas	5	(0)
2026–	Cultural Leonesa	0	(0)
- * Club domestic league appearances and goals as of 21:48, 27 October 2025 (UTC)

Roberto "Róber" Suárez Pier (born 16 February 1995) is a Spanish professional footballer who plays as a centre-back for Primera Federación club Cultural Leonesa.

== Club career ==
=== Deportivo ===
Born in Oleiros, Galicia, Pier was a youth product of Deportivo de La Coruña. He made his debut as a senior with their reserves in 2012, spending several years with the side in the Tercera División.

Pier made his competitive debut for the first team on 2 December 2015, starting in a 2–1 away win against UE Llagostera in the round of 32 of the Copa del Rey. His first match in La Liga took place on 12 March 2016, when he came on as a second-half substitute for Álex Bergantiños in a 3–0 away loss to Atlético Madrid.

=== Levante ===
On 6 July 2016, Pier was loaned to Segunda División club Levante UD for one year. He scored his first professional goal the following 13 May, his team's second in the 2–1 home victory over Girona FC.

On 2 August 2017, after achieving top-tier promotion as champions, Pier renewed with Deportivo until 2020 and immediately returned to Levante on a one-year loan deal. The following 7 July, the move was extended for a further season.

Pier signed a permanent four-year contract at the Estadi Ciutat de València on 2 September 2019.

=== Sporting Gijón ===
On 1 August 2023, free agent Pier agreed to a two-year deal with Sporting de Gijón in the second division. He totalled 75 games during his spell in Asturias, scoring twice.

=== Later career ===
The 30-year-old Pier moved abroad for the first time in June 2025, on a contract at Liga MX side Atlas FC. He returned to Spain one year later, joining Cultural y Deportiva Leonesa of Primera Federación.

== Honours ==
Levante

- Segunda División: 2016–17
