= Pablo Martínez (Spanish footballer) =

Spanish footballer

Personal information
- Full name: Pablo Martínez Andrés
- Date of birth: 22 February 1998 (age 28)
- Place of birth: Madrid, Spain
- Height: 1.82 m (6 ft 0 in)
- Position: Defensive midfielder

Team information
- Current team: Málaga
- Number: 18

Youth career
- 2007–2016: Moratalaz
- 2016–2017: Alcorcón

Senior career*
Years	Team	Apps	(Gls)
2017–2018	Alcorcón B	26	(6)
2018–2019	Alcorcón	1	(0)
2018–2019	→ SS Reyes (loan)	33	(5)
2019–2020	Levante B	20	(3)
2019–2026	Levante	154	(12)
2020–2021	→ Mirandés (loan)	37	(3)
2022	→ Huesca (loan)	17	(1)
2026–	Málaga	0	(0)
- * Club domestic league appearances and goals as of 27 May 2026

Pablo Martínez Andrés (born 22 February 1998) is a Spanish professional footballer who plays as a defensive midfielder for La Liga club Málaga CF.

== Career ==
=== Alcorcón ===
Martínez was born in Madrid, and joined AD Alcorcón's youth setup in January 2016, from ED Moratalaz. He made his senior debut with the reserves on 12 April of the following year, coming on as a second-half substitute in a 3–1 Tercera División home loss against Atlético Madrid B.

Martínez scored his first senior goal on 28 January 2018, netting the last in a 5–0 away routing of CF San Agustín del Guadalix. He made his first team debut on 17 February, as he replaced Foued Kadir in a 1–1 home draw against CD Tenerife in the Segunda División.

On 16 August 2018, Martínez joined Segunda División B side UD San Sebastián de los Reyes on loan for a year.

=== Levante ===
On 5 July 2019, Martínez moved to Levante UD after agreeing to a three-year contract, and was assigned to the B-team in the same category. He made his La Liga debut on 1 December, replacing Nikola Vukčević late into a 4–0 away loss against Getafe CF.

On 17 July 2020, Martínez renewed his contract until 2024, and joined CD Mirandés in the second division on a one-year loan deal on 2 October. Upon returning, he was permanently assigned in the main squad for the 2021–22 campaign, but was loaned to second division side SD Huesca on 14 January 2022. He scored his first professional goal nine days later, but in a 2–1 home loss against SD Ponferradina.

Back to the Granotes in July 2022, with the club now also in division two, Martínez started to feature regularly and renewed his link until 2026 on 8 February 2023. He was an undisputed starter during the 2024–25 season, scoring three goals in 37 appearances overall as the club returned to the top tier.

Martínez scored his first goal in the main category of Spanish football on 23 January 2026, netting the equalizer in a 3–2 home win over Elche CF. He left the club on 30 June, as his contract was due to expire, after 12 goals in 155 official matches.

=== Málaga ===
On 21 August 2026, free agent Martínez signed a one-year deal with fellow top tier side Málaga CF, with an option for a further season.

== Honours ==
Levante

- Segunda División: 2024–25
