= Sergio Postigo =

Spanish footballer

Personal information
- Full name: Sergio Postigo Redondo
- Date of birth: 4 November 1988 (age 38)
- Place of birth: Madrid, Spain
- Height: 1.84 m (6 ft 0 in)
- Position: Centre-back

Youth career
- Leganés

Senior career*
| Years | Team | Apps | (Gls) |
| 2007–2008 | Leganés B | 18 | (0) |
| 2007–2010 | Leganés | 28 | (2) |
| 2010–2012 | Osasuna B | 51 | (2) |
| 2012–2013 | Getafe B | 30 | (1) |
| 2013–2015 | Leganés | 58 | (2) |
| 2015–2016 | Spezia | 31 | (2) |
| 2016–2024 | Levante | 194 | (5) |
| 2024–2026 | Mirandés | 20 | (0) |
- * Club domestic league appearances and goals as of 29 November 2025

Sergio Postigo Redondo (born 4 November 1988) is a Spanish professional footballer who plays as a central defender.

He scored three goals in 114 games in La Liga in five seasons with Levante.

== Club career ==
Born in Madrid, Postigo finished his development at CD Leganés, and made his senior debut with the reserves in the regional leagues. Also in the 2007–08 season, he began appearing with the first team in the Segunda División B.

In July 2010, Postigo signed with CA Osasuna, being initially assigned to the B side also in the third division. On 13 January 2012, he appeared in his first game as a professional, playing the last 11 minutes of a 1–2 home loss against FC Barcelona in the round of 16 of the Copa del Rey.

Postigo was released by the Navarrese in May 2012, and shortly after moved to another reserve team, Getafe CF B. In July of the following year, however, he was released again, returning to former club Leganés shortly after.

On 20 July 2015, Postigo moved abroad for the first time in his career, joining Spezia Calcio from the Italian Serie B after paying his €300.000 buyout clause. On 16 July of the following year, he returned to Spain, signing a two-year contract with Segunda División side Levante UD.

Postigo contributed two goals in 36 appearances in his first season, as his team achieved promotion to La Liga. He made his debut in the competition on 21 August 2017, starting the 1–0 home win over Villarreal CF. His first goal came the following 11 February, but in a 3–1 defeat at Valencia CF.

On 17 July 2024, free agent Postigo agreed a one-year deal at second-tier CD Mirandés. At the end of the campaign, the 36-year-old agreed to a contract of the same duration.

== Career statistics ==
As of 2 June 2024

| Club | Season | League | | | Cup | | Continental | | Other | | Total | |
| Club | Season | Division | Apps | Goals | Apps | Goals | Apps | Goals | Apps | Goals | Apps | Goals |
|---|---|---|---|---|---|---|---|---|---|---|---|---|
| Leganés | 2007–08 | Segunda División B | 1 | 0 | — | | — | | — | | 1 | 0 |
| Leganés | 2008–09 | Segunda División B | 5 | 0 | — | | — | | 0 | 0 | 5 | 0 |
| Leganés | 2009–10 | Segunda División B | 22 | 2 | — | | — | | — | | 22 | 2 |
| Leganés | Total | | 28 | 2 | — | | — | | 0 | 0 | 28 | 2 |
| Osasuna B | 2010–11 | Segunda División B | 22 | 1 | — | | — | | — | | 22 | 1 |
| Osasuna B | 2011–12 | Segunda División B | 29 | 1 | — | | — | | — | | 29 | 1 |
| Osasuna B | Total | | 51 | 2 | — | | — | | — | | 51 | 2 |
| Osasuna | 2011–12 | La Liga | 0 | 0 | 1 | 0 | — | | — | | 1 | 0 |
| Getafe B | 2012–13 | Segunda División B | 30 | 1 | — | | — | | — | | 30 | 1 |
| Getafe | 2012–13 | La Liga | 0 | 0 | — | | — | | — | | 0 | 0 |
| Leganés | 2013–14 | Segunda División B | 15 | 0 | 3 | 1 | — | | 6 (Note: Appearances in Segunda División B play-offs) | 0 | 24 | 1 |
| Leganés | 2014–15 | Segunda División | 37 | 2 | 0 | 0 | — | | — | | 37 | 2 |
| Leganés | Total | | 52 | 2 | 3 | 1 | — | | 6 | 0 | 61 | 3 |
| Spezia | 2015–16 | Serie B | 31 | 2 | 3 | 1 | — | | — | | 34 | 3 |
| Levante | 2016–17 | Segunda División | 36 | 2 | 0 | 0 | — | | — | | 36 | 2 |
| Levante | 2017–18 | La Liga | 30 | 1 | 2 | 0 | — | | — | | 32 | 1 |
| Levante | 2018–19 | La Liga | 21 | 1 | 2 | 0 | — | | — | | 23 | 1 |
| Levante | 2019–20 | La Liga | 28 | 1 | 0 | 0 | — | | — | | 28 | 1 |
| Levante | 2020–21 | La Liga | 22 | 0 | 5 | 0 | — | | — | | 27 | 0 |
| Levante | 2021–22 | La Liga | 13 | 0 | 0 | 0 | — | | — | | 13 | 0 |
| Levante | 2022–23 | Segunda División | 21 | 0 | 2 | 1 | — | | 4 (Note: Appearances in La Liga play-offs) | 0 | 27 | 1 |
| Levante | 2023–24 | Segunda División | 23 | 0 | 1 | 0 | — | | — | | 24 | 0 |
| Levante | Total | | 194 | 5 | 12 | 1 | — | | 4 | 0 | 210 | 6 |
| Career Total | | | 386 | 14 | 16 | 2 | — | | 10 | 0 | 410 | 16 |

== Honours ==
Levante

- Segunda División: 2016–17
