= 2024–25 Levante UD season =

Levante UD
2024–25 season
- President: Pablo Sánchez
- Head coach: Julián Calero
- Stadium: Estadi Ciutat de València
- Segunda División: 1st (promoted)
- Copa del Rey: First round
- Top goalscorer: League: Roger Brugué; José Luis Morales (11 each); All: José Luis Morales (12)
- Average home league attendance: 15,985
Home colours	Away colours	Third colours

The 2024–25 season was the 86th season in the history of Levante UD, and the club's third consecutive season in the Segunda División. In addition to the domestic league, the club participated in the Copa del Rey.

== Players ==
=== First-team squad ===
As of 3 February 2025

Note: Flags indicate national team as defined under FIFA eligibility rules; some limited exceptions apply. Players may hold more than one non-FIFA nationality.

No.	Pos.	Nation	Player
1	GK	ESP	Andrés Fernández (4th captain)
4	DF	ESP	Adrián de la Fuente
5	DF	ESP	Unai Elgezabal
6	MF	GEO	Giorgi Kochorashvili
7	FW	ESP	Roger Brugué
8	MF	ESP	Ángel Algobia
9	FW	ESP	Iván Romero
10	MF	ESP	Vicente Iborra (captain)
11	FW	ESP	José Luis Morales (3rd captain)
13	GK	ESP	Alfonso Pastor
14	DF	ESP	Jorge Cabello
16	DF	ESP	Diego Pampín

No.	Pos.	Nation	Player
18	DF	ESP	Ignasi Miquel
19	FW	ESP	Álex Forés (on loan from Villarreal B)
20	MF	ESP	Oriol Rey
21	MF	ESP	Sergio Lozano
22	DF	ESP	Manu Sánchez
23	MF	ESP	Pablo Martínez (vice-captain)
24	FW	ESP	Carlos Álvarez
29	DF	ESP	Marcos Navarro
30	FW	ESP	Víctor Fernández
31	DF	ESP	Xavi Grande
32	GK	ESP	Alejandro Primo
38	FW	ESP	Carlos Espí

=== Reserve team ===
Note: Flags indicate national team as defined under FIFA eligibility rules; some limited exceptions apply. Players may hold more than one non-FIFA nationality.

No.	Pos.	Nation	Player
26	DF	ESP	David Sellés
27	MF	ESP	Edgar Alcañiz

No.	Pos.	Nation	Player
34	DF	ESP	Borja Cortina

=== Out on loan ===
Note: Flags indicate national team as defined under FIFA eligibility rules; some limited exceptions apply. Players may hold more than one non-FIFA nationality.

No.	Pos.	Nation	Player
—	GK	ESP	Pablo Cuñat (at Cartagena until 30 June 2025)
—	GK	ESP	Dani Martín (at Marbella until 30 June 2025)

No.	Pos.	Nation	Player
—	DF	ALG	Chemseddine Bekkouche (at Recreativo until 30 June 2025)
—	MF	ESP	Óscar Clemente (at Cartagena until 30 June 2025)

== Transfers ==
=== In ===
Pos.	Player	Transferred from	Fee	Date	Source
FW	(Spain) José Luis Morales	(Spain) Villarreal	Free	5 July 2024	
MF	(Spain) Vicente Iborra	(Greece) Olympiacos	Free	9 July 2024	
DF	(Spain) Diego Pampín	Andorra	Free	22 July 2024	
FW	(Spain) Álex Forés	(Spain) Villarreal	Loan	19 January 2025	

=== Out ===
Pos.	Player	Transferred to	Fee	Date	Source
DF	(Spain) Enric Franquesa	(Spain) Leganés		1 July 2024	
MF	(Spain) Alejandro Cantero	(Spain) Tenerife		21 July 2024	
FW	(Brazil) Fabrício	(Brazil) Vitória		10 January 2025	
DF	(Spain) Andrés García	(England) Aston Villa	€7M	21 January 2025	

== Friendlies ==
=== Pre-season ===
17 July 2024 Friendly	Levante	1–0	Castellón	Buñol
19:00	Brugué 24'			Stadium: Ciudad Deportiva de Buñol - Campo 1

20 July 2024 Friendly	Levante	4–0	Qatar SC	Benidorm
19:00	Fabrício 2'; Algobia 10'; Martínez 17'; Espí 83'	Report		Stadium: Instalaciones del Hotel Meliá Villaitana

27 July 2024 Friendly	Levante	1–1	Alavés	La Nucia
19:30	Bouldini 36'		Stoichkov 19'	Stadium: Estadi Olímpic Camilo Cano

31 July 2024 Friendly	Valencia	0–0	Levante	Paterna
19:00				Stadium: Ciudad Deportiva

3 August 2024 Friendly	Levante	3–2	Villarreal CF B
19:00

== Competitions ==
=== Overall record ===
Competition	First match	Last match	Starting round	Final position	Record							
Competition	First match	Last match	Starting round	Final position	Pld	W	D	L	GF	GA	GD	Win %
Segunda División	18 August 2024	1 June 2025	Matchday 1	Winners	42	22	13	7	69	42	+27	52.38
Copa del Rey	19 November 2024		First round	First round	1	0	0	1	1	4	−3	0.00
Total					43	22	13	8	70	46	+24	51.16

Source: Soccerway

=== Segunda División ===
==== League table ====
Pos	Team	Pld	W	D	L	GF	GA	GD	Pts	Qualification or relegation
1	Levante (C, P)	42	22	13	7	69	42	+27	79	Promotion to La Liga
2	Elche (P)	42	22	11	9	59	34	+25	77	Promotion to La Liga
3	Oviedo (O, P)	42	21	12	9	56	42	+14	75 (Note: Oviedo finished ahead of Mirandés on head-to-head goal difference: Oviedo 4–1 Mirandés, Mirandés 1–0 Oviedo.)	Qualification for promotion playoffs
4	Mirandés	42	22	9	11	59	40	+19	75	Qualification for promotion playoffs
5	Racing Santander	42	20	11	11	65	51	+14	71	Qualification for promotion playoffs

Source: LaLiga Hypermotion
Rules for classification: 1) Points; 2) Head-to-head points; 3) Head-to-head goal difference; 4) Goal difference; 5) Goals scored; 6) Fair-play points
(Note: Head-to-head record is used only after all the matches between the teams in question have been played)
(C) Champions; (O) Play-off winners; (P) Promoted

==== Results summary ====
Overall								Home						Away					
Pld	W	D	L	GF	GA	GD	Pts	W	D	L	GF	GA	GD	W	D	L	GF	GA	GD
42	22	13	7	69	42	+27	79	13	7	1	42	20	+22	9	6	6	27	22	+5

Source: Soccerway

==== Results by round ====
Round	1	2	3	4	5	6	7	8	9	10	11	12	13	14	15	16	17	18	19	20	21	22	23	24	25	26	27	28	29	30	31	32	33	34	35	36	37	38	39	40	41	42
Ground	A	H	A	A	H	A	H	H	A	A	H	A	H	A	H	H	A	H	A	H	A	A	H	A	H	A	H	H	A	H	A	H	A	H	A	H	A	H	A	H	A	H
Result	W	D	D	W	W	L	W	D	L	L	W	W	D	D	W	W	L	D	D	D	W	D	W	W	L	D	D	W	W	W	W	W	L	W	D	W	L	D	W	W	W	W
Position	5	5	5	4	1	6	1	3	4	9	6	2	2	2	2	2	2	3	4	5	5	5	5	4	7	7	7	6	4	2	1	1	2	2	2	2	2	2	2	1	1	1

Source: WorldFootball.net
A = Away; H = Home; W = Win; D = Draw; L = Loss

==== Matches ====
The match schedule was released on 26 June 2024.

18 August 2024 1	Sporting Gijón	1–2	Levante	Gijón
17:00	Olaetxea (yellow card) 40'; Ángel (yellow card) 57'; Dubasin 59'	Report	Álvarez 14'; Kochorashvili 42'; Elgezabal (yellow card) 44'; Navarro (yellow card) 80'	Stadium: El Molinón; Attendance: 23,319; Referee: José Luis Guzmán Mansilla

24 August 2024 2	Levante	1–1	Cádiz	Valencia
19:00	Brugué 57'		Alcaraz 81' (pen.)	Stadium: Estadi Ciutat de València

2 September 2024 3	Eibar	2–2	Levante	Eibar
19:00	Puertas 47', 90+2'		Brugué 4'; Romero 79'	Stadium: Ipurua Municipal Stadium

8 September 2024 4	Cartagena	0–1	Levante	Cartagena
16:15			Morales 28'	Stadium: Estadio Cartagonova

14 September 2024 5	Levante	3–1	Eldense	Valencia
16:15	Martínez 44'; Espí 74'; Álvarez 81'		Chapela 41'	Stadium: Estadi Ciutat de València

21 September 2024 6	Zaragoza	2–1	Levante	Zaragoza
21:00	Soberón 16' (pen.); Baždar 85'		Morales 40'	Stadium: La Romareda

29 September 2024 7	Levante	4–2	Almería	Valencia
14:00	Brugué 2'; Morales 15'; Kochorashvili 51'; Carlos Álvarez 74'		Arribas 17', 45+2'	Stadium: Estadi Ciutat de València

6 October 2024 8	Levante	0–0	Oviedo	Valencia
16:30				Stadium: Estadi Ciutat de València

13 October 2024 9	Racing Santander	1–0	Levante	Santander
14:15	Vicente 81'			Stadium: El Sardinero

19 October 2024 10	Castellón	2–0	Levante	Castellón de la Plana
16:30	Sánchez 53', 77'			Stadium: Nou Estadi Castàlia

24 October 2024 11	Levante	2–1	Deportivo La Coruña	Valencia
17:00	Romero 7', 28'		Barbero 88'	Stadium: Estadi Ciutat de València

27 October 2024 12	Granada	1–2	Levante	Granada
19:00	Sánchez 58'		Kochorashvili 18'; Martínez 31'	Stadium: Nuevo Estadio de Los Cármenes

16 November 2024 13	Levante	1–1	Elche	Valencia
16:30	Brugué 73'		Álvarez 33'	Stadium: Estadi Ciutat de València

22 November 2024 14	Racing Ferrol	0–0	Levante	Ferrol
18:30				Stadium: Estadio Municipal da Malata

27 November 2024 15	Levante	4–2	Malaga	Valencia
17:00	Romero 14', 33'; Espí 81'; Algobia 90+5'		Larrubia 16'; Lorenzo 41'	Stadium: Estadi Ciutat de València

1 December 2024 16	Levante	3–1	Burgos	Valencia
16:30	Morales 35'; Espí 84', 90+2'		Sánchez 20'	Stadium: Estadi Ciutat de València

6 December 2024 17	Mirandés	2–1	Levante	Miranda de Ebro
18:30	Roca 87'; Panichelli 90+3'		García 56'	Stadium: Estadio Municipal de Anduva

14 December 2024 18	Levante	2–2	Córdoba	Valencia
12:00	Morales 56'; Kochorashvili 84' (pen.)		Zidane 46'; González 90+4' (pen.)	Stadium: Estadi Ciutat de València

17 December 2024 19	Albacete	0–0	Levante	Albacete
17:00				Stadium: Estadio Carlos Belmonte

22 December 2024 20	Levante	1–1	Huesca	Valencia
19:00	García 90+5'		Soko 45'	Stadium: Estadi Ciutat de València

7 January 2025 21	Tenerife	0–3	Levante	Santa Cruz de Tenerife
19:30			Morales 49'; Badia 71' (o.g.); García 85'	Stadium: Estadio Heliodoro Rodríguez López

12 January 2025 22	Cádiz	0–0	Levante	Cádiz
14:15				Stadium: Nuevo Mirandilla

18 January 2025 23	Levante	3–1	Granada	Valencia
19:00	Brugué 21'; Algobia 72'; Kochorashvili 90+5'		Boyé 58'	Stadium: Estadi Ciutat de València

25 January 2025 24	Deportivo La Coruña	1–2	Levante	A Coruña
18:30	José Ángel (yellow card) 19'; Martinez (yellow card) 74'; Diego Villares 82'	Report	Unai Elgezabal (yellow card) 20'; Carlos Álvarez 51'; Adrián de la Fuente (yellow card) 62'; Sergio Lozano (yellow card) 68'; José Luis Morales 84'; Oriol Rey (yellow card) 90+3'	Stadium: Estadio Riazor; Attendance: 22,397; Referee: (Spain) Manuel Orellana Cid

3 February 2025 25	Levante	0–1	Racing de Ferrol	Valencia
20:30	Jorge Cabello (yellow card) 54'	Report	Josué Dorrio 8'; Eneko Jauregi (yellow card) 47'	Stadium: Estadi Ciutat de València; Attendance: 13,464; Referee: (Spain) Álvaro Moreno Aragón

8 February 2025 26	Málaga	1–1	Levante	Málaga
18:30	Álex Pastor 68'; Kevin (yellow card) 90'; Carlos Puga (red card) 90+2'	Report	Unai Elgezabal (yellow card) 20'; Pablo Martínez 35' (pen.); Manu Sánchez (yellow card) 55'	Stadium: La Rosaleda Stadium; Attendance: 24,512; Referee: (Spain) Iosu Galech Apezteguía

16 February 2025 27	Levante	0–0	Sporting Gijón	Valencia
14:00	Unai Elgezabal (yellow card) 21'; Vicente Iborra (yellow card) 42'; Adrián de la Fuente (yellow card) 81'	Report	Lander Olaetxea (yellow card) 27'; Nacho Méndez (yellow card) 62'	Stadium: Estadi Ciutat de València; Attendance: 16,906; Referee: (Spain) Manuel Pérez Hernández

23 February 2025 28	Levante	1–0	Mirandés	Valencia
18:30	Vicente Iborra (yellow card) 53'; Carlos Álvarez 65'; Adrián de la Fuente (yellow card) 90+3' (yellow-red card) 90+5'; Sergio Lozano (yellow card) 90+4'	Report	Alberto Dadie (red card) 90+3'	Stadium: Estadi Ciutat de València; Attendance: 14,857; Referee: (Spain) Carlos Muñiz Muñoz

2 March 2025 29	Eldense	1–2	Levante	Elda
18:30	Diego Collado 44' (yellow card) 68'; Dani Martín (yellow card) 84'; Sergio Ortuño (yellow card) 90+1'; Raúl Parra (yellow card) 90+1'	Report	Ignasi Miquel (yellow card) 80'; Roger Brugué 90+1'; Carlos Espí 90+4'	Stadium: Nuevo Pepico Amat; Attendance: 5,327; Referee: (Spain) Miguel González Díaz

9 March 2025 30	Levante	3–0	FC Cartagena	Valencia
18:30	Iván Romero 29'; Kochorashvili (yellow card) 50' (goal) 71'; Vicente Iborra 89' (pen.)	Report	Martín Aguirregabiria (yellow card) 25'; Musto (yellow card) 48'; Šipčić (yellow card) 90'	Stadium: Estadi Ciutat de València; Attendance: 14,367; Referee: (Spain) Germán Cid Camacho

16 March 2025 31	Huesca	1–2	Levante	Huesca
16:15	Jordi Martín (yellow card) 29'; Miguel Loureiro (yellow card) 57'; Joaquín Muñoz 69'; Diego González (yellow card) 89'; Jorge Pulido (yellow card) 90+8'	Report	Diego Pampín 54' (yellow card) 90+7'; Kochorashvili (yellow card) 87'; Álex Forés 90+1'	Stadium: Estadio El Alcoraz; Attendance: 6,833; Referee: (Spain) Jon González Esteban

23 March 2025 32	Levante	3–2	Castellón	Valencia
14:00	Iván Romero 34' (pen.) 45+3'; Adrián de la Fuente 88' (pen.)	Report	Camara 27' 55'; Israel Suero (yellow card) 35'; Chirino (yellow card) 57'; van den Belt (yellow card) 87'; Alberto Jiménez (yellow card) 88'	Stadium: Estadi Ciutat de València; Attendance: 16,953; Referee: (Spain) Oliver De la Fuente Ramos

29 March 2025 33	Almería	1–0	Levante	Almería
21:00	Lopy (yellow card) 36'; Suárez 81' (pen.)	Report	Roger Brugué (yellow card) 54'; Ignasi Miquel (yellow card) 80'; José Luis Morales (yellow card) 80'; Sergio Lozano (yellow card) 85'; Kochorashvili (yellow card) 90+5'	Stadium: UD Almería Stadium; Attendance: 10,930; Referee: (Spain) Eder Mallo Fernández

6 April 2025 34	Levante	3–1	Racing Santander	Valencia
16:15	José Luis Morales 16' 46'; Adrián de la Fuente (yellow card) 60'; Carlos Álvarez (yellow card) 71'; Jorge Cabello (yellow card) 81'; Oriol Rey (yellow card) 90+2'; Álex Forés 90+7' (yellow card) 90+9'	Report	Álvaro Mantilla (yellow card) 86'; Javier Castro 90+5'	Stadium: Estadi Ciutat de València; Attendance: 20,389; Referee: (Spain) Iosu Galech Apezteguía

11 April 2025 35	Córdoba	2–2	Levante	Córdoba
20:30	Pedro Ortiz 48'; Carlos Albarrán (yellow card) 80'; Rubén Alves 90+7'	Report	Roger Brugué 17'; Manu Sánchez (yellow card) 73'; Vicente Iborra (yellow card) 80'; Álex Forés 90+2'; Adrián de la Fuente (yellow card) 90+5'	Stadium: Estadio Nuevo Arcángel; Attendance: 15,879; Referee: (Spain) Daniel Palencia Caballero

19 April 2025 36	Levante	5–2	Zaragoza	Valencia
18:30	Carlos Álvarez 6'; Álex Forés 12'; José Luis Morales 50'; Carlos Espí 85'; Iván Romero 90+2' (pen.)	Report	Bernardo Vital (yellow card) 60'; Pau Sans 89'; Iván Calero (yellow card) 90'; Mario Soberón 90+3'	Stadium: Estadi Ciutat de València; Attendance: 18,506; Referee: (Spain) Germán Cid Camacho

26 April 2025 37	Oviedo	1–0	Levante	Oviedo
16:15	Ignasi Miquel 27' (o.g.); Jaime Seoane (yellow card) 49'; Colombatto (yellow card) 82'; Alemão (yellow card) 90+8'	Report		Stadium: Estadio Carlos Tartiere; Attendance: 20,840; Referee: (Spain) José Luis Guzmán Mansilla

4 May 2025 38	Levante	–	Tenerife	Valencia
14:00				Stadium: Estadi Ciutat de València; Referee: (Spain)

=== Copa del Rey ===
19 November 2024 First round	Pontevedra	4–1	Levante	Pontevedra
18:00	Hernández 24'; Fontán 57'; Castellano 90+1'; Pino 90+6'		Morales 72'	Stadium: Estadio Municipal de Pasarón
