= 2025–26 Levante UD season =

Levante UD
2025–26 season
- President: Pablo Sánchez
- Head coach: Julián Calero (until 30 November); Álvaro del Moral (caretaker, from 30 November to 20 December); Luís Castro (from 20 December)
- Stadium: Estadi Ciutat de València
- La Liga: 16th
- Copa del Rey: Round of 32
- Top goalscorer: League: Carlos Espí (11); All: Carlos Espí (13)
- Biggest win: Girona 0–4 Levante
- Biggest defeat: Villarreal 5–1 Levante
Home colours	Away colours	Third colours

The 2025–26 season was the 87th season in the history of Levante UD, and the club's first season back in La Liga following promotion from the Segunda División in the previous campaign. In addition to the domestic league, the club participated in the Copa del Rey.

Julián Calero was dismissed as coach on 30 November 2025 after 14 matches. Levante sat at the bottom of the La Liga table at the time, equal with Oviedo on 9 points. His replacement, Luís Castro, would guide the club to safety, finishing the season in 16th place.

== Players ==
=== First-team squad ===
As of 29 January 2026

Note: Flags indicate national team as defined under FIFA eligibility rules; some limited exceptions apply. Players may hold more than one non-FIFA nationality.

No.	Pos.	Nation	Player
1	GK	ESP	Pablo Campos
2	DF	ARG	Matías Moreno (on loan from Fiorentina)
3	DF	URU	Alan Matturro (on loan from Genoa)
4	DF	ESP	Adrián de la Fuente (3rd captain)
5	DF	ESP	Unai Elgezabal (vice-captain)
6	DF	ESP	Diego Pampín
7	FW	ESP	Roger Brugué (4th captain)
8	MF	ESP	Jon Ander Olasagasti
9	FW	ESP	Iván Romero
10	MF	ESP	Pablo Martínez (captain)
11	FW	ESP	José Luis Morales
12	MF	ESP	Unai Vencedor (on loan from Athletic Bilbao)
13	GK	AUS	Mathew Ryan

No.	Pos.	Nation	Player
14	MF	FRA	Ugo Raghouber (on loan from Lille)
16	MF	HON	Kervin Arriaga
17	DF	ESP	Víctor García
18	FW	ESP	Iker Losada (on loan from Real Betis)
19	FW	ESP	Carlos Espí
20	MF	ESP	Oriol Rey
21	FW	CMR	Karl Etta Eyong
22	DF	GER	Jeremy Toljan
23	DF	ESP	Manu Sánchez (on loan from Celta Vigo)
24	MF	ESP	Carlos Álvarez
27	MF	ESP	Paco Cortés
32	GK	ESP	Alejandro Primo
55	MF	ISR	Tay Abed

=== Reserve team ===
Note: Flags indicate national team as defined under FIFA eligibility rules; some limited exceptions apply. Players may hold more than one non-FIFA nationality.

No.	Pos.	Nation	Player
26	MF	ESP	Kareem Tunde
28	DF	PAN	Martín Krug
29	DF	ESP	Nacho Pérez
30	MF	ESP	Pablo Rosón

No.	Pos.	Nation	Player
33	MF	ESP	Joan Ruiz
34	GK	ESP	Cayetano Romero
35	DF	GHA	Huseini Nakoha
37	MF	ESP	Dani Cervera

=== Out on loan ===
Note: Flags indicate national team as defined under FIFA eligibility rules; some limited exceptions apply. Players may hold more than one non-FIFA nationality.

No.	Pos.	Nation	Player
—	GK	ESP	Dani Martín (at Huesca until 30 June 2026)
—	DF	ESP	Jorge Cabello (at Mirandés until 30 June 2026)
—	DF	ESP	Xavi Grande (at Marítimo until 30 June 2026)

No.	Pos.	Nation	Player
—	MF	ESP	Hugo Redón (at Teruel until 30 June 2026)
—	MF	ESP	Edgar Alcañiz (at Cartagena until 30 June 2026)
—	FW	ESP	Víctor Fernández (at Valencia Mestalla until 30 June 2026)

== Transfers ==
=== In ===
Pos.	Player	Transferred from	Fee	Date	Source
MF	(Honduras) Kervin Arriaga	(Serbia) Partizan	€500,000	2 July 2025	
MF	(Spain) Víctor García	(Spain) Eldense	Free	3 July 2025	
DF	(Germany) Jeremy Toljan	(Italy) Sassuolo	Free	8 July 2025	
DF	(Uruguay) Alan Matturro	(Italy) Genoa	Loan	9 July 2025	
DF	(Argentina) Matías Moreno	(Italy) Fiorentina	Loan	11 July 2025	
MF	(Spain) Jon Ander Olasagasti	(Spain) Real Sociedad	€500,000	16 July 2025	
DF	(Spain) Manu Sánchez	(Spain) Celta Vigo	Loan	25 July 2025	
MF	(Spain) Iker Losada	(Spain) Real Betis	Loan	21 August 2025	
GK	(Australia) Mathew Ryan	(France) Lens	Free	26 August 2025	
MF	(Spain) Unai Vencedor	(Spain) Athletic Bilbao	Loan	1 September 2025	
MF	(Cameroon) Karl Etta Eyong	(Spain) Villarreal	€3,000,000	1 September 2025	
FW	(Spain) Paco Cortés	(Spain) Cultural Leonesa	Loan return	8 January 2026	
MF	(France) Ugo Raghouber	(France) Lille	Loan	14 January 2026	

=== Out ===
Pos.	Player	Transferred to	Fee	Date	Source
FW	(Spain) Álex Forés	(Spain) Villarreal	Loan return	30 June 2025	
MF	(Spain) Vicente Iborra	Retired		1 July 2025	
MF	(Georgia (country)) Giorgi Kochorashvili	(Portugal) Sporting CP	€5,500,000	1 July 2025	
MF	(Spain) Ángel Algobia	(Portugal) AVS		14 July 2025	
GK	(Spain) Alfonso Pastor	(Portugal) Rio Ave	Free	1 September 2025	
MF	(Spain) Sergio Lozano	(Poland) Jagiellonia Białystok	Free	2 September 2025	
DF	(Spain) Jorge Cabello	(Spain) Mirandés	Loan	8 January 2026	

== Pre-season and friendlies ==
12 July 2025	Levante	0–0	Johor Darul Ta'zim
19:00

23 July 2025	Teruel	0–2	Levante
20:00

26 July 2025	Levante	2–0	Neom
19:00

31 July 2025	Al Qadsiah	0–0	Levante
19:00

8 August 2025	Levante	0–2	Castellón
19:00

9 August 2025	Auxerre	0–2	Levante
19:00

13 October 2025	Leganés	3–3 (4–3 p)	Levante
20:00

== Competitions ==
=== La Liga ===
Pos	Team	Pld	W	D	L	GF	GA	GD	Pts	Qualification or relegation
14	Alavés	38	11	10	17	44	56	−12	43 (Note: Head-to-head points: Sevilla 6, Alavés 5, Elche 3.)	
15	Elche	38	10	13	15	49	57	−8	43	
16	Levante	38	11	9	18	47	61	−14	42 (Note: Head-to-head points: Levante 7, Osasuna 5, Mallorca 3.)	
17	Osasuna	38	11	9	18	44	50	−6	42	
18	Mallorca (R)	38	11	9	18	47	57	−10	42	Relegation to Segunda División

Source: LaLiga EA Sports
Rules for classification: 1) Points; 2) Head-to-head points; 3) Head-to-head goal difference; 4) Goal difference; 5) Goals scored; 6) Fair-play points
(Note: Head-to-head record is used only after all the matches between the teams in question have been played)
(R) Relegated

==== Results by round ====
Round	1	2	3	4	5	6	7	8
Ground	A	H	A	H	A	H	A	A
Result	L	L	L	D	W	L	D	W
Position								

A = Away; H = Home; W = Win; D = Draw; L = Loss

==== Matches ====
16 August 2025 1	Alavés	2–1	Levante
21:30

23 August 2025 2	Levante	2–3	Barcelona
21:30

29 August 2025 3	Elche	2–0	Levante
19:30

14 September 2025 4	Levante	2–2	Real Betis
16:15

20 September 2025 5	Girona	0–4	Levante
14:00

23 September 2025 6	Levante	1–4	Real Madrid
21:30

27 September 2025 7	Getafe	1–1	Levante
14:00

4 October 2025 8	Oviedo	0–2	Levante
14:00

19 October 2025 9	Levante	0–3	Rayo Vallecano
18:30

26 October 2025 10	Mallorca	1–1	Levante
14:00

2 November 2025 11	Levante	1–2	Celta Vigo
14:00

8 November 2025 12	Atlético Madrid	3–1	Levante
18:30

21 November 2025 13	Valencia	1–0	Levante
21:00

29 November 2025 14	Levante	0–2	Athletic Bilbao
18:30

8 December 2025 15	Osasuna	2–0	Levante
21:00

20 December 2025 17	Levante	1–1	Real Sociedad
16:15

4 January 2026 18	Sevilla	0–3	Levante
14:00

11 January 2026 19	Levante	1–1	Espanyol
16:15

17 January 2026 20	Real Madrid	2–0	Levante
14:00

23 January 2026 21	Levante	3–2	Elche
21:00

31 January 2026 22	Levante	0–0	Atlético Madrid
18:30

8 February 2026 23	Athletic Bilbao	4–2	Levante
16:15

15 February 2026 24	Levante	0–2	Valencia
18:30

18 February 2026 16	Levante	0–1	Villarreal
20:00

22 February 2026 25	Barcelona	3–0	Levante
16:15

27 February 2026 26	Levante	2–0	Alavés
21:00

7 March 2026 27	Levante	1–1	Girona
16:15

16 March 2026 28	Rayo Vallecano	1–1	Levante
21:00

21 March 2026 29	Levante	4–2	Oviedo
18:30

4 April 2026 30	Real Sociedad	2–0	Levante
14:00

13 April 2026 31	Levante	1–0	Getafe	Valencia
21:00	Espí (yellow card) 12', (goal) 84'; De la Fuente (penalty missed) , 62; Romero (penalty missed) , 90+2, (yellow card) 90+3'		Vázquez (yellow card) 47'; Djene (yellow card) 59'; Romero (yellow card) 79' (yellow-red card) 90+1'; Duarte (yellow card) 79'; Femenía (yellow card) 81'	Stadium: Estadi Ciutat de València; Attendance: 18,155; Referee: Alejandro Quintero González

23 April 2026 33	Levante	2–0	Sevilla	Valencia
19:00	Rey (yellow card) 24'; Romero 39', 90+4', (yellow card) 90+1'; Raghouber (yellow card) 60'		Adams (yellow card) 11'; Agoumé (yellow card) 61'; Sow (yellow card) 78'; Romero (yellow card) 90+9'	Stadium: Estadi Ciutat de València; Referee: José María Sánchez Martínez

27 April 2026 32	Espanyol	0–0	Levante	Cornellà de Llobregat
21:00				Stadium: RCDE Stadium; Referee: Mateo Busquets Ferrer

2 May 2026 34	Villarreal	5–1	Levante
14:00

8 May 2026 35	Levante	3–2	Osasuna
21:00

12 May 2026 36	Celta Vigo	2–3	Levante
19:00

17 May 2026 37	Levante	2–0	Mallorca
19:00

23 May 2026 38	Real Betis	2–1	Levante
21:00

=== Copa del Rey ===
30 October 2025 First round	Orihuela	3–4	Levante
19:00

3 December 2025 Second round	Cieza	0–1	Levante
21:00

17 December 2025 Round of 32	Cultural Leonesa	1–0	Levante
18:00
