= 2023–24 Levante UD season =

Levante UD
2023–24 season
- President: Quico Catalán (until 4 September); Pablo Sánchez (from 4 September)
- Head coach: Javier Calleja (until 19 February); Felipe Miñambres (from 19 February)
- Stadium: Estadi Ciutat de València
- Segunda División: 8th
- Copa del Rey: Second round
- Top goalscorer: League: Mohamed Bouldini (8); All: Mohamed Bouldini (8)
- Average home league attendance: 14,226

The 2023–24 season was Levante UD's 85th season in existence and second consecutive in the Segunda División, the second division of association football in Spain. They also competed in the Copa del Rey.

== Players ==
=== First-team squad ===
As of 2 February 2024

Note: Flags indicate national team as defined under FIFA eligibility rules; some limited exceptions apply. Players may hold more than one non-FIFA nationality.

No.	Pos.	Nation	Player
1	GK	ESP	Joan Femenías (vice-captain)
2	DF	ESP	Ander Capa
3	DF	ESP	Álex Muñoz (4th captain)
4	DF	ESP	Adrián de la Fuente
5	DF	ESP	Álex Valle (on loan from Barcelona)
6	MF	GEO	Giorgi Kochorashvili
7	FW	ESP	Roger Brugué
9	FW	ESP	Dani Gómez
10	MF	ESP	Pablo Martínez
11	FW	ESP	Alejandro Cantero
12	FW	BRA	Fabrício
13	GK	ESP	Andrés Fernández
14	DF	SRB	Nikola Maraš (on loan from Deportivo Alavés)

No.	Pos.	Nation	Player
15	DF	ESP	Sergio Postigo (captain)
16	MF	ESP	Álex Blesa
17	MF	ESP	Óscar Clemente
18	FW	ESP	Iván Romero
19	FW	ESP	Rober Ibáñez
20	MF	ESP	Oriol Rey
21	MF	ESP	Sergio Lozano
22	FW	MAR	Mohamed Bouldini
23	MF	ESP	Ángel Algobia
29	DF	ESP	Marcos Navarro
30	FW	ESP	Andrés García
31	DF	ESP	Xavi Grande
37	FW	ESP	Carlos Álvarez

=== Reserve team ===
Note: Flags indicate national team as defined under FIFA eligibility rules; some limited exceptions apply. Players may hold more than one non-FIFA nationality.

No.	Pos.	Nation	Player
27	MF	ESP	Edgar Alcañiz
28	DF	ESP	Carlos Jiménez
32	GK	ESP	Álex Primo
33	GK	ESP	Alfonso Pastor
34	DF	ESP	Borja Cortina
35	MF	ESP	Lass Kourouma

No.	Pos.	Nation	Player
38	FW	ESP	Carlos Espí
39	MF	ESP	Hugo Redón
41	DF	ESP	David Sellés
42	DF	ESP	Buba Sangaré
43	DF	ESP	Jorge Cabello
44	FW	ESP	Paco Cortés

=== Out on loan ===
Note: Flags indicate national team as defined under FIFA eligibility rules; some limited exceptions apply. Players may hold more than one non-FIFA nationality.

No.	Pos.	Nation	Player
—	GK	ESP	Pablo Cuñat (at Amorebieta until 30 June 2024)
—	DF	ESP	Enric Franquesa (at Leganés until 30 June 2024)

No.	Pos.	Nation	Player
—	MF	ESP	Alex Cerdá (at Real Unión until 30 June 2024)
—	MF	ESP	Carlos Benítez (at Fuenlabrada until 30 June 2024)

== Transfers ==
=== In ===
Pos.	Player	Transferred from	Fee	Date	Source
FW	(Spain) Iván Romero	(Spain) Sevilla	Free	12 August 2023	
MF	(Spain) Carlos Álvarez	(Spain) Sevilla Atlético	Free	12 August 2023	
DF	(Spain) Álex Valle	(Spain) Barcelona	Loan	14 August 2023	
DF	(Spain) Ander Capa	(Spain) Athletic Bilbao	Free	15 August 2023	
GK	(Spain) Andrés Fernández	(Spain) Huesca	Free	18 August 2023	

=== Out ===
Pos.	Player	Transferred to	Fee	Date	Source
DF	(Spain) Toni Herrero	(Spain) Sabadell	Free	14 August 2023	
MF	(Spain) Jorge de Frutos	(Spain) Rayo Vallecano	€8,000,000	17 August 2023	
GK	(Spain) Daniel Cárdenas	(Spain) Rayo Vallecano	Undisclosed	18 August 2023	
MF	(Belgium) Charly Musonda	Released		1 September 2023	

== Pre-season and friendlies ==
Win Draw Loss

15 July 2023 Friendly	Levante	1–1	Stoke City	La Nucía
18:15 UTC+2	Cantero 22'		Campbell 62'	Stadium: Estadi Olímpic Camilo Cano

22 July 2023 Friendly	Levante	1–2	Nottingham Forest	Buñol
11:00 UTC+2	Cantero 25'		Yates 3'; Danilo 21'; Awoniyi (red card) 45'	Stadium: Ciudad Deportiva de Buñol; Attendance: 0 Referee: Escriche Guzmán

28 July 2023 Friendly	Levante	1–1	Qatar SC	Buñol
18:00 UTC+2	Brugue 33'; Lozano (red card) 53'	Report	Omar (red card) 53'; Ben 74'	Stadium: Ciudad Deportiva de Buñol; Referee: José Tárraga Lajara

2 August 2023 Friendly	Castellón	2–1	Levante	El Saler
18:30 UTC+2		Report		Referee: Andrés Molina Fuentes

5 August 2023 Friendly	Leganés	2–0	Levante	Leganés
20:00 UTC+2	García 10', 49'	Report		Stadium: Estadio Municipal de Butarque; Referee: Javier Alberola Rojas

== Competitions ==
=== Overall record ===
Competition	First match	Last match	Starting round	Final position	Record							
Competition	First match	Last match	Starting round	Final position	Pld	W	D	L	GF	GA	GD	Win %
Segunda División	12 August 2023	2 June 2024	Matchday 1	8th	42	13	20	9	49	45	+4	30.95
Copa del Rey	31 October 2023	6 December 2023	First round	Second round	2	1	0	1	3	1	+2	50.00
Total					44	14	20	10	52	46	+6	31.82

Source: Soccerway

=== Segunda División ===
==== League table ====
Pos	Team	Pld	W	D	L	GF	GA	GD	Pts	Qualification or relegation
6	Oviedo	42	17	13	12	55	39	+16	64 (Note: Oviedo finished ahead of Racing Santander on overall goal difference)	Qualification for promotion play-offs
7	Racing Santander	42	18	10	14	63	55	+8	64	
8	Levante	42	13	20	9	49	45	+4	59 (Note: Levante finished ahead of Burgos, Racing Ferrol, and Elche on head-to-head points: Levante 12 pts, Burgos 8 pts, Racing Ferrol 8 pts, Elche 4 pts. Burgos finished ahead of Racing Ferrol on head-to-head points: Racing Ferrol 1–1 Burgos, Burgos 2–0 Racing Ferrol)	
9	Burgos	42	16	11	15	52	54	−2	59	
10	Racing Ferrol	42	15	14	13	49	52	−3	59	

Updated to match(es) played on 2 Jun 2024. Source: LaLiga HyperMotion
Rules for classification: 1) Points; 2) Head-to-head points; 3) Head-to-head goal difference; 4) Goal difference; 5) Goals scored; 6) Fair-play points
(Note: Head-to-head record is used only after all the matches between the teams in question have been played)

==== Results summary ====
Overall								Home						Away					
Pld	W	D	L	GF	GA	GD	Pts	W	D	L	GF	GA	GD	W	D	L	GF	GA	GD
42	13	20	9	49	45	+4	59	9	8	4	31	28	+3	4	12	5	18	17	+1

Source: LaLiga.com

==== Results by round ====
Round	1	2	3	4	5	6	7	8	9	10
Ground	A	H	A	H	H	A	H	A	H	A
Result	D	W	W	D	L	W	W	D	D	W
Position	10	5	4	6	7	5	5	4	6	

Updated to match(es) played on 25 November 2023. Source: LaLiga.com
A = Away; H = Home; W = Win; D = Draw; L = Loss

==== Matches ====
The league fixtures were unveiled on 28 June 2023.

11 August 2023 1	Amorebieta	1–1	Levante	Lezama
19:00 CEST (UTC+2)	Jauregi 64'	Report	Bouldini 30'; Cantero (yellow card) 34'; Rey (yellow card) 45+1'	Stadium: Instalaciones de Lezama Campo 2 Attendance: 1,297; Referee: Dámaso Arcediano Monescillo

19 August 2023 2	Levante	3–2	Burgos	Valencia
19:30 CEST (UTC+2)	Femenías (yellow card) 45'; Lozano (yellow card) 45', (goal) 45+6'; Cantero 45+3'; Bouldini 60'; Postigo (yellow card) 70'; Muñoz (yellow card) 90+9'	Report	Elgezabal (yellow card) 10'; Sánchez 45'; Espiau (yellow card) 70'; Sánchez 71' (pen.); Miki (yellow card) 82'	Stadium: Estadi Ciutat de València; Attendance: 12,952; Referee: José Luis Guzmán Mansilla

25 August 2023 3	Cartagena	0–1	Levante	Cartagena
21:30 CEST (UTC+2)	Musto (yellow card) 56'; Sánchez (yellow card) 62'; Jansson (yellow card) 71'; Real (yellow card) 73'	Report	Kochorashvili 25', (yellow card) 37'; Cantero (yellow card) 54'; Postigo (yellow card) 64'; Muñoz (yellow card) 80'; Bouldini (yellow card) 80'; Álvarez (yellow card) 90+4'	Stadium: Cartagonova; Attendance: 7,243; Referee: Adrián Cordero Vega

2 September 2023 4	Levante	1–1	Oviedo	Valencia
18:30 CEST (UTC+2)	Bouldini 63'	Report	Bastón 47'	Stadium: Estadi Ciutat de València; Attendance: 13,844; Referee: Luis Mario Milla Alvendiz

8 September 2023 5	Levante	1–4	Espanyol	Valencia
21:00 CEST (UTC+2)	Bouldini 34'	Report	Melamed 13', 56'; Puado 45+1', 84'	Stadium: Estadi Ciutat de València; Attendance: 15,548; Referee: Jon Ander González Esteban

16 September 2023 6	Alcorcón	0–2	Levante	Alcorcón
18:30 CEST (UTC+2)		Report	Rey 36'; Brugué 80'	Stadium: Estadio Municipal de Santo Domingo; Attendance: 3,505; Referee: Iosu Galech Apezteguía

23 September 2023 7	Levante	2–0	Eldense	Valencia
16:15 CEST (UTC+2)	Bouldini 28'; Fabrício 82'	Report		Stadium: Estadi Ciutat de València; Attendance: 14,845; Referee: Rafael Sánchez López

30 September 2023 8	Elche	0–0	Levante	Elche
18:30 CEST (UTC+2)		Report		Stadium: Estadio Martínez Valero; Referee: Raúl Martín González Francés

3 October 2023 9	Levante	1–1	Villarreal B	Valencia
19:00 CEST (UTC+2)		Report		Stadium: Estadi Ciutat de València; Referee: Adrián Cordero Vega

6 October 2023 10	Albacete	0–2	Levante	Albacete
21:00 CEST (UTC+2)		Report		Stadium: Estadio Carlos Belmonte; Referee: José Antonio López Toca

16 October 2023 11	Levante	1–0	Racing Ferrol	Valencia
21:00 CEST (UTC+2)				Stadium: Estadi Ciutat de València; Referee: Rubén Ávalos Barrera

4 November 2023 14	Levante	2–2	Mirandés	Valencia
18:30 CET (UTC+1)				Stadium: Estadi Ciutat de València; Referee: Raúl Martín González Francés

20 November 2023 16	Levante	2–4	Racing de Santander	Valencia
21:00 CET (UTC+1)				Stadium: Estadi Ciutat de València; Referee: Marcos Barroso Galán

2 December 2023 18	Levante	v	Valladolid	Valencia
21:00 CET (UTC+1)				Stadium: Estadi Ciutat de València

TBD 28	Levante	v	Andorra	Valencia
--:-- CET (UTC+1)				Stadium: Estadi Ciutat de València
Note: The match, which was scheduled for 24 February 2024, was postponed due to the Valencia fire.

2 March 2024 29	Oviedo	v	Levante	Oviedo
18:30				Stadium: Estadio Carlos Tartiere

10 March 2024 30	Levante	v	Sporting Gijón	Valencia
16:15				Stadium: Estadi Ciutat de València

16 March 2024 31	Burgos	v	Levante	Burgos
14:00				Stadium: El Plantío

24 March 2024 32	Levante	v	Elche	Valencia
				Stadium: Estadi Ciutat de València

31 March 2024 33	Valladolid	v	Levante	Valladolid
				Stadium: Estadio José Zorrilla

7 April 2024 34	Levante	v	Zaragoza	Valencia
				Stadium: Estadi Ciutat de València

14 April 2024 35	Levante	v	Amorebieta	Valencia
				Stadium: Estadi Ciutat de València

21 April 2024 36	Racing Santander	v	Levante	Santander
				Stadium: Campos de Sport de El Sardinero

28 April 2024 37	Levante	v	Cartagena	Valencia
				Stadium: Estadi Ciutat de València

5 May 2024 38	Villarreal B	v	Levante	Villarreal

12 May 2024 39	Levante	v	Eibar	Valencia
				Stadium: Estadi Ciutat de València

19 May 2024 40	Eldense	v	Levante	Elda
				Stadium: Nuevo Pepico Amat

26 May 2024 41	Levante	v	Alcorcón	Valencia
				Stadium: Estadi Ciutat de València

2 June 2024 42	Huesca	v	Levante	Huesca
				Stadium: Estadio El Alcoraz

=== Copa del Rey ===
31 October 2023 First round	Varea	0–3	Levante	Varea
20:00 CET (UTC+1)		Report	Álvarez 51'; Ibáñez 60'; Gómez 77'	Stadium: Estadio Municipal de Varea; Referee: Jon Ander González Esteban

6 December 2023 Second round	Levante	0–1	Amorebieta	Valencia
19:00 CET (UTC+1)	Muñoz (yellow card) 62'	Report	Eraso (yellow card) 55', (goal) 71'; Carbonell (yellow card) 65'	Stadium: Estadi Ciutat de València; Attendance: 11,216; Referee: Miguel Sesma Espinosa
