= Alejandro Primo =

Spanish footballer

Personal information
- Full name: Alejandro Primo Hernández
- Date of birth: 10 July 2004 (age 22)
- Place of birth: Valencia, Spain
- Height: 1.87 m (6 ft 2 in)
- Position: Goalkeeper

Team information
- Current team: Levante
- Number: 32

Youth career
- 2012–2023: Levante

Senior career*
Years	Team	Apps	(Gls)
2021–2025	Levante B	60	(0)
2022–	Levante	1	(0)
- * Club domestic league appearances and goals as of 1 June 2025

Alejandro Primo Hernández (born 10 July 2004) is a Spanish professional footballer who plays as a goalkeeper for Levante UD.

== Career ==
Primo was born in Valencia, and was a Levante UD youth graduate. He was a part of the reserves in the 2021–22 Segunda División RFEF, but acted only as a third-choice.

On 15 May 2022, after first team members Aitor Fernández and Dani Cárdenas were out due to a suspicion of COVID-19 and a severe gastrointestinal problem, respectively, Primo was named in the starting lineup of a La Liga match against Deportivo Alavés, as the B-team starter Pablo Cuñat were already in action with the B's and his reserve Pablo Picón did not renew his contract. He made his professional debut at the age of just 17, starting in the 3–1 home win at the Estadi Ciutat de València.

== Career statistics ==
As of match played 1 June 2025

Appearances and goals by club, season and competition
Club	Season	League			National cup		Europe		Other		Total	
Club	Season	Division	Apps	Goals	Apps	Goals	Apps	Goals	Apps	Goals	Apps	Goals
Levante B	2021–22	Segunda División RFEF	0	0	—		—		—		0	0
Levante B	2022–23	Tercera Federación	0	0	—		—		0	0	0	0
Levante B	2023–24	Tercera Federación	30	0	—		—		—		30	0
Levante B	2024–25	Tercera Federación	30	0	—		—		—		30	0
Levante B	Total		60	0	—		—		0	0	60	0
Levante	2021–22	La Liga	1	0	0	0	—		—		1	0
Levante	2023–24	Segunda División	0	0	0	0	—		—		0	0
Levante	2024–25	Segunda División	0	0	0	0	—		—		0	0
Levante	2025–26	La Liga	0	0	0	0	—		—		0	0
Levante	Total		1	0	0	0	—		—		1	0
Career total			61	0	0	0	0	0	0	0	62	0
