= José Luis Morales (footballer, born 1987) =

Spanish footballer (born 1987)

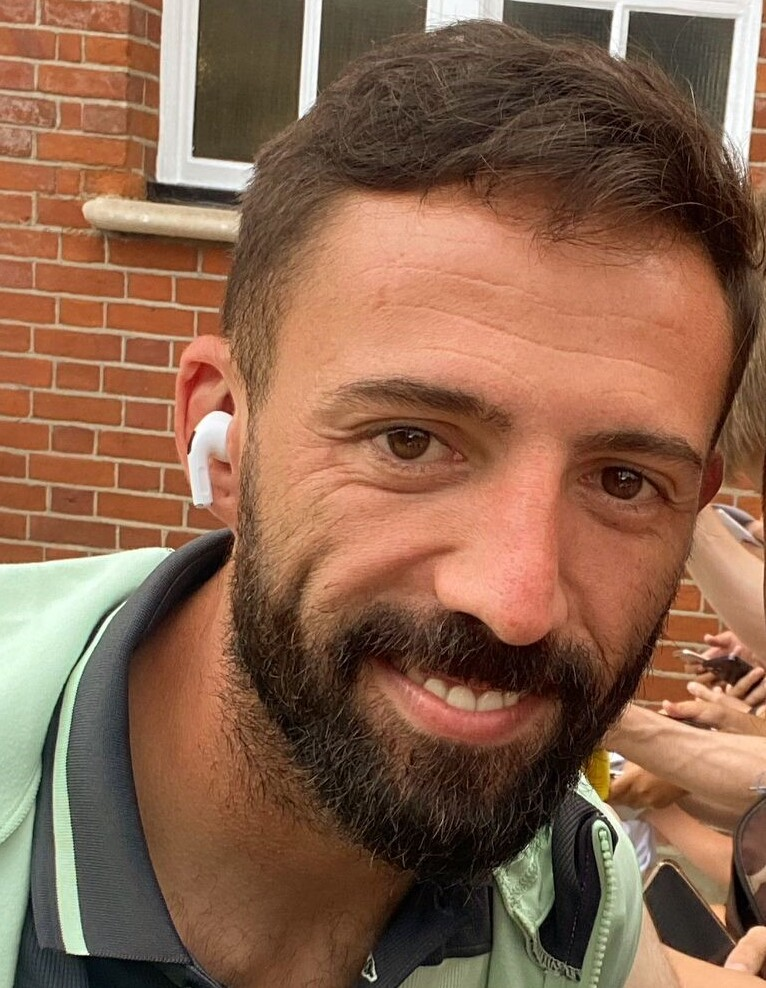
- Morales in 2022

Personal information
- Full name: José Luis Morales Nogales
- Date of birth: 23 July 1987 (age 39)
- Place of birth: Madrid, Spain
- Height: 1.80 m (5 ft 11 in)
- Positions: Winger; forward

Team information
- Current team: Oviedo
- Number: 25

Youth career
- 1992–2006: Brunete

Senior career*
Years	Team	Apps	(Gls)
2006–2010	Parla	69	(17)
2010–2011	Fuenlabrada	36	(20)
2011–2013	Levante B	79	(22)
2013–2022	Levante	294	(66)
2013–2014	→ Eibar (loan)	38	(3)
2022–2024	Villarreal	58	(14)
2024–2026	Levante	62	(12)
2026–	Oviedo	4	(0)
- * Club domestic league appearances and goals as of 19:18, 11 November 2026 (UTC)

José Luis Morales Nogales (Spanish pronunciation: [xoˈse lwis moˈɾales]; born 23 July 1987) is a Spanish professional footballer who plays as a winger or forward for Segunda División club Oviedo.

A late bloomer, he only reached La Liga at the age of 27, with Levante, and spent most of his career with the club while appearing in 377 competitive matches and scoring 83 goals across two spells. He also won the 2016–17 Segunda División.

== Career ==
=== Early career ===
Born in Madrid, Morales only played amateur football well into his 20s. At 10 or 11 years of age, he had unsuccessful trials with Real Madrid. A Brunete youth graduate, he made his senior debut in the Tercera División with Parla.

Morales signed with Fuenlabrada also in the fourth division – and the Community of Madrid – in 2010. He scored a career-best 20 goals in his only season, in an eighth-place finish.

=== Levante ===
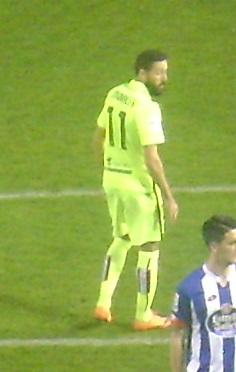
Morales with Levante in 2016

On 1 July 2011, Morales joined Levante, being assigned to the reserves in the fourth tier and promoting in his first season, with the player contributing 14 goals in 41 matches. On 17 April 2013, he agreed to a new two-year deal and was promoted to the main squad.

Morales was loaned to Segunda División club Eibar on 30 July 2013. He played his first game as a professional on 18 August 2013, starting in a 2–1 away win against Real Jaén.

Morales scored his first professional goal on 27 October 2013, the second in the 2–0 victory at Barcelona B. He added a further two in 40 competitive appearances during the campaign, helping the Basques to a first-ever promotion to La Liga.

Back to Levante, Morales made his top-flight debut on 30 August 2014, starting in a 3–0 away loss to Athletic Bilbao. He scored his first goal in the competition on 4 October, in a 3–3 draw at former side Eibar.

On 29 May 2015, Morales renewed his contract with the Valencians, signing until 2019. He scored 12 times in 2018–19, adding five assists for the 15th-placed team.

Morales netted 13 goals in 2020–21, establishing himself as Levante's all-time scorer in the top division. He repeated the feat the following season (with seven assists), but was not able to prevent relegation.

=== Villarreal ===
On 24 June 2022, Villarreal announced the signing of Morales on a two-year deal. On 6 October, he scored a second-half hat-trick as a substitute in the 5–0 home win over Austria Wien in the group stage of the UEFA Europa Conference League.

Morales scored a further three times on 26 November 2023 in the 3–1 league victory against Osasuna, this time as a starter.

=== Levante return ===
On 5 July 2024, the free agent Morales returned to Levante on a one-year contract. He and Roger Brugué led all players in the squad in the first season of his second spell with 11 goals, in a top-flight promotion as champions; in addition, in took part in all 42 league games.

=== Oviedo ===
On 4 October 2026, aged 39, Morales joined Real Oviedo on a contract running until June 2027.

== Career statistics ==
As of match played 8 May 2026

Appearances and goals by club, season and competition
Club	Season	League			Copa del Rey		Other		Total	
Club	Season	Division	Apps	Goals	Apps	Goals	Apps	Goals	Apps	Goals
Eibar (loan)	2013–14	Segunda División	38	3	2	0	—		40	3
Levante	2014–15	La Liga	36	3	0	0	—		36	3
Levante	2015–16	La Liga	35	7	1	0	—		36	7
Levante	2016–17	Segunda División	40	4	0	0	—		40	4
Levante	2017–18	La Liga	35	10	4	2	—		39	12
Levante	2018–19	La Liga	37	12	1	0	—		38	12
Levante	2019–20	La Liga	38	4	3	0	—		41	4
Levante	2020–21	La Liga	38	13	7	1	—		45	14
Levante	2021–22	La Liga	35	13	1	0	—		36	13
Levante	Total		294	66	17	3	—		311	69
Villarreal	2022–23	La Liga	29	7	3	2	10 (Note: Appearances in UEFA Conference League)	6	42	15
Villarreal	2023–24	La Liga	29	7	3	2	6 (Note: Appearances in UEFA Europa League)	1	38	10
Villarreal	Total		58	14	6	4	16	7	80	25
Levante	2024–25	Segunda División	42	11	1	1	—		43	12
Levante	2025–26	La Liga	20	1	3	1	—		23	2
Levante	Total		62	12	4	2	—		66	14
Career total			452	95	29	9	16	7	497	111

== Honours ==
Eibar

- Segunda División: 2013–14

Levante

- Segunda División: 2016–17, 2024–25

Individual

- Segunda División Player of the Month: December 2013
