= 2026–27 Real Madrid CF season =

Real Madrid
2026–27 season
- President: Florentino Pérez
- Head coach: José Mourinho
- Stadium: Bernabéu
- La Liga: 2nd
- Copa del Rey: Round of 32
- Supercopa de España: Semi-finals
- UEFA Champions League: League phase
- Top goalscorer: League: Kylian Mbappé (13); All: Kylian Mbappé (17)
- Highest home attendance: 75,242 vs Villarreal
- Lowest home attendance: 71,898 vs Rayo Vallecano
- Average home league attendance: 73,719
- Biggest win: 4–0 vs Málaga
- Biggest defeat: 0–1 vs Real Betis; 1–2 vs Atlético Madrid
| Home colours | Away colours | Third colours |
- All statistics correct as of 21 November 2026.

The 2026–27 season is Real Madrid Club de Fútbol's 123rd season in existence and the club's 96th consecutive season in the top flight of Spanish football. In addition to the domestic league, Real Madrid is participating in this season's editions of the Copa del Rey, the Supercopa de España and the UEFA Champions League.

This season is the first since 2012–13 without youth graduate and captain Dani Carvajal, as well as the first since 2020–21 without David Alaba, both of whom departed as free agents, to Getafe and Udinese, respectively.

The departure of Carvajal marked the end of the club's association with the last remaining player from the squad that won the UEFA Champions League in three consecutive seasons, in 2016, 2017 and 2018 respectively.

== Summary ==
=== Pre-season ===
On 18 May 2026, Madrid announced an agreement with Dani Carvajal for the club captain to depart after 23 seasons within the club's ranks. He left as the holder of 27 senior trophies and as one of only five players in football history to have won six European Cups. On 22 May, the club confirmed the departure of David Alaba, who concluded his five-year spell at Real Madrid with eleven trophies, including two UEFA Champions League titles. On 7 June, following the first presidential vote by club members in two decades, Florentino Pérez was elected president in the extraordinary elections announced on 12 May. On 9 June, Madrid reached an agreement with Álvaro Arbeloa to end his tenure as first-team head coach. On 11 June, José Mourinho returned as the club's head coach, signing a contract running until 30 June 2029, effective from 13 July. Madrid's first summer signing was confirmed on 15 June, when Marc Cucurella joined from Chelsea on a six-year contract, with the move set to become effective after the 2026 FIFA World Cup. On 16 June, Antonio Rüdiger committed his future to the club by signing a one-year contract extension until 2027. On 17 June, Madrid secured the signing of Bernardo Silva on a free transfer from Manchester City, with the Portuguese midfielder agreeing a two-year contract after the World Cup. On 18 June, Ibrahima Konaté also arrived on a free transfer, leaving Liverpool to sign a four-year deal with the club. On 26 June, Dani Ceballos departed the club after his contract was terminated by mutual consent, bringing an end to a nine-year association during which he collected fifteen trophies. Madrid strengthened further on 5 July by completing the signing of Denzel Dumfries from Inter Milan, with the Dutch defender penning a four-year contract. On 8 July, Fran García completed a permanent transfer to Real Betis. On 30 July, Madrid signed Levante's striker Carlos Espí on a contract running until 2031. On 3 August, Gonzalo García completed a permanent move to Fulham, with Madrid confirming his departure. On 6 August, Madrid completed the signing of Yan Diomande from RB Leipzig, with the Ivorian winger agreeing to a seven-year contract. On the same day, the club confirmed an agreement with Vinícius Júnior to extend the Brazilian forward's contract until 2032. On 7 August, Madrid announced that Franco Mastantuono had joined Fiorentina on loan until the end of the season.

=== August ===
On 22 August, Madrid opened the new campaign with a 2–1 victory away at Espanyol, as Carlos Espí scored a late close-range winner after Jude Bellingham had also found the net. Four days later, Kylian Mbappé recorded his first goals of the season by scoring a hat-trick, while Vinícius added another goal as Madrid secured a 4–1 win over Real Sociedad at the Bernabéu. On 30 August, Madrid beat Málaga 4–0 at home to maintain their perfect start to the league campaign, with Bellingham, Mbappé and Arda Güler all finding the net alongside an own goal.

=== September ===
Madrid suffered their first defeat of the season on 4 September, losing 1–0 to Real Betis in the league. On 8 September, Madrid beat Inter Milan 2–1 in their Champions League opener with goals from Mbappé and Federico Valverde. Four days later, Madrid beat Rayo Vallecano 4–1 at home, with Mbappé scoring twice and Álvaro Carreras and Bellingham also finding the net. On 15 September, Madrid defeated Elche 3–2 away from home, with Mbappé and an own goal giving Madrid a two-goal lead before Espí scored the stoppage-time winner after Elche had fought back to level. Five days later, Real lost 1–2 to Atlético Madrid in the Madrid derby, with Rüdiger scoring the only goal for the team.

=== October ===
Following a lengthy international break, Madrid returned to action on 10 October in their first match of the month, defeating Villarreal 1–0 at the Bernabéu, with Diomande scoring his first goal for the club in the second half to secure the victory. Four days later, Madrid staged a comeback from 1–3 down to win 4–3 away from home against Roma in the Champions League, completing the turnaround in the final ten minutes with goals from Mbappé, Espí, Endrick and Rüdiger. On 18 October, Madrid secured a 4–1 win over Sevilla at home, with Güler opening the scoring before Mbappé struck twice and Diomande added a fourth to round off the victory. Three days later, Madrid defeated RB Leipzig 4–1 on matchday three of the Champions League league phase, maintaining their perfect record in the competition, as Silva opened his scoring account for the club before Güler, Mbappé and Diomande also found the net. On 25 October, a brace from Mbappé sealed the win in the first El Clásico of the season, beating Barcelona 2–1 at the Spotify Camp Nou.

=== November ===
On 1 November, Madrid started the month with another win, as Racing Santander were beaten 3–0 on the road with goals from Mbappé, Bellingham and Diomande. Three days later, goals from Bellingham and Mbappé brought Madrid level after twice falling behind against AEK Athens, before Valverde scored a stoppage-time winner in a 3–2 victory. On 7 November, first-half goals from Valverde and Güler were followed up by a finish from Mbappé in the second half, as Madrid beat Valencia 3–0 away from home. On 18 November, Güler signed a contract extension until 2032. The following day, Aurélien Tchouaméni also extended his contract until 2032, while Thibaut Courtois's renewal until 2028 was confirmed on 20 November. On 21 November, Madrid came from behind to defeat Celta Vigo 2–1 at home following the international break, with goals from Bellingham and Espí securing the victory.

== Kits ==
| Home | Away | Third |

| Goalkeeper 1 | Goalkeeper 2 | Goalkeeper 3 | Goalkeeper 4 | Goalkeeper 5 |

== Players ==
As of 2 September 2026

Note: Flags indicate national team as defined under FIFA eligibility rules; some limited exceptions apply. Players may hold more than one non-FIFA nationality.

| No. | Pos. | Nation | Player |
|---|---|---|---|
| 1 | GK | BEL | Thibaut Courtois |
| 2 | DF | ESP | Raúl Asencio |
| 3 | DF | BRA | Éder Militão |
| 4 | DF | ESP | Dean Huijsen |
| 5 | MF | ENG | Jude Bellingham |
| 6 | MF | FRA | Eduardo Camavinga |
| 7 | FW | BRA | Vinícius Júnior (vice-captain) |
| 8 | MF | URU | Federico Valverde (captain) |
| 9 | FW | BRA | Endrick |
| 10 | FW | FRA | Kylian Mbappé |
| 11 | FW | BRA | Rodrygo |
| 12 | DF | ENG | Trent Alexander-Arnold |
| 13 | GK | UKR | Andriy Lunin |

| No. | Pos. | Nation | Player |
|---|---|---|---|
| 14 | MF | FRA | Aurélien Tchouaméni |
| 15 | MF | TUR | Arda Güler |
| 16 | DF | FRA | Ibrahima Konaté |
| 17 | DF | ESP | Marc Cucurella |
| 18 | DF | ESP | Álvaro Carreras |
| 19 | FW | ESP | Carlos Espí |
| 20 | MF | POR | Bernardo Silva |
| 21 | FW | MAR | Brahim Díaz |
| 22 | DF | GER | Antonio Rüdiger |
| 23 | DF | FRA | Ferland Mendy |
| 24 | DF | NED | Denzel Dumfries |
| 25 | FW | CIV | Yan Diomande |
| 27 | MF | ESP | Thiago Pitarch |

== Transfers ==
=== In ===
| Date | Pos. | Player | From | Type | Ref. |
|---|---|---|---|---|---|
| 1 July 2026 | DF | (Spain) Marc Cucurella | (England) Chelsea | Transfer | |
| 1 July 2026 | DF | (France) Ibrahima Konaté | (England) Liverpool | Free transfer | |
| 1 July 2026 | MF | (Portugal) Bernardo Silva | (England) Manchester City | Free transfer | |
| 1 July 2026 | FW | (Brazil) Endrick | (France) Lyon | End of loan | |
| 5 July 2026 | DF | (Netherlands) Denzel Dumfries | (Italy) Inter Milan | Transfer | |
| 30 July 2026 | FW | (Spain) Carlos Espí | Levante | Transfer | |
| 6 August 2026 | FW | (Ivory Coast) Yan Diomande | (Germany) RB Leipzig | Transfer | |

=== Out ===
| Date | Pos. | Player | To | Type | Ref. |
|---|---|---|---|---|---|
| 26 June 2026 | MF | (Spain) Dani Ceballos | Real Betis | Mutual agreement | |
| 1 July 2026 | DF | (Austria) David Alaba | (Italy) Udinese | End of contract | |
| 1 July 2026 | DF | (Spain) Dani Carvajal | Getafe | End of contract | |
| 8 July 2026 | DF | (Spain) Fran García | Real Betis | Transfer | |
| 3 August 2026 | FW | (Spain) Gonzalo García | (England) Fulham | Transfer | |
| 7 August 2026 | FW | (Argentina) Franco Mastantuono | (Italy) Fiorentina | Loan | |

=== Contract renewals ===
| Date | Pos. | Player | Contract length | Contract ends | Ref. |
|---|---|---|---|---|---|
| 16 June 2026 | DF | (Germany) Antonio Rüdiger | 1 year | 2027 | |
| 6 August 2026 | FW | (Brazil) Vinícius Júnior | 5 years | 2032 | |
| 18 November 2026 | MF | (Turkey) Arda Güler | 3 years | 2032 | |
| 19 November 2026 | MF | (France) Aurélien Tchouaméni | 4 years | 2032 | |
| 20 November 2026 | GK | (Belgium) Thibaut Courtois | 1 year | 2028 | |

== Pre-season and friendlies ==
On 9 July 2026, Real Madrid announced they would play against Deportivo A Coruña for the Teresa Herrera Trophy.

| 24 July 2026 1 | Alcorcón | 0–1 | Real Madrid | Madrid |
| 19:00 UTC+2 | | Report | Yáñez 81' (pen.) | Stadium: Alfredo Di Stéfano; Attendance: 0 |
Note: The match was played behind closed doors.

| 28 July 2026 2 | Leganés | 1–4 | Real Madrid | Madrid |
| 11:30 UTC+2 | N. García 36' | Report | Valverde 21'; García 25'; Mastantuono 58'; Pulido 60' (o.g.) | Stadium: Alfredo Di Stéfano; Attendance: 0 |
Note: The match was played behind closed doors.

| 1 August 2026 3 | Real Madrid (Spain) | 2–2 | (Italy) Fiorentina | Klagenfurt, Austria |
| 18:00 UTC+2 | Endrick 12'; Ciria 24' | Report | Piccoli 41'; Kean 58' | Stadium: Wörthersee Stadion; Attendance: 30,000; Referee: Julian Weinberger (Austria) |

| 8 August 2026 4 | Ferencváros (Hungary) | 1–2 | (Spain) Real Madrid | Budapest, Hungary |
| 19:00 UTC+2 | Kodro 57' | Report | Rivas 41'; Espí 49' | Stadium: Groupama Aréna; Attendance: 20,097; Referee: Balázs Berke (Hungary) |

| 12 August 2026 5 | Deportivo A Coruña | 0–1 | Real Madrid | A Coruña |
| 21:00 UTC+2 | | Report | Brahim 45+1' | Stadium: ABANCA-Riazor; Attendance: 28,789; Referee: Adrián Cordero Vega |

| 16 August 2026 6 | Schalke 04 (Germany) | 0–3 | (Spain) Real Madrid | Gelsenkirchen, Germany |
| 17:00 UTC+2 | | Report | Mbappé 6'; Huijsen 20'; Espí 57' | Stadium: Veltins-Arena; Attendance: 61,587; Referee: Sören Storks |

== Competitions ==
=== Overview ===
| Competition | First match | Last match | Starting round | Record | | | | | | | |
| Competition | First match | Last match | Starting round | Pld | W | D | L | GF | GA | GD | Win % |
|---|---|---|---|---|---|---|---|---|---|---|---|
| La Liga | 22 August 2026 | 30 May 2027 | Matchday 1 | 13 | 11 | 0 | 2 | 33 | 11 | +22 | 84.62 |
| Copa del Rey | 15–17 December 2026 | | Round of 32 | 0 | 0 | 0 | 0 | 0 | 0 | +0 | — |
| Supercopa de España | 3 February 2027 | February 2027 | Semi-finals | 0 | 0 | 0 | 0 | 0 | 0 | +0 | — |
| UEFA Champions League | 8 September 2026 | | League phase | 4 | 4 | 0 | 0 | 13 | 7 | +6 | 100.00 |
| Total | | | | 17 | 15 | 0 | 2 | 46 | 18 | +28 | 88.24 |

Last updated: 21 November 2026
Source: Soccerway

=== La Liga ===
==== League table ====
| Pos | Team | Pld | W | D | L | GF | GA | GD | Pts | Qualification or relegation |
|---|---|---|---|---|---|---|---|---|---|---|
| 1 | Barcelona | 13 | 12 | 0 | 1 | 51 | 15 | +36 | 36 | Qualification for the UEFA Champions League league phase |
| 2 | Real Madrid | 13 | 11 | 0 | 2 | 33 | 11 | +22 | 33 | Qualification for the UEFA Champions League league phase |
| 3 | Atlético Madrid | 12 | 9 | 1 | 2 | 23 | 10 | +13 | 28 | Qualification for the UEFA Champions League league phase |
| 4 | Real Betis | 13 | 8 | 3 | 2 | 21 | 16 | +5 | 27 | Qualification for the UEFA Champions League league phase |
| 5 | Real Sociedad | 12 | 7 | 1 | 4 | 21 | 20 | +1 | 22 | Qualification for the UEFA Europa League league phase |

Updated to match(es) played on 22 November 2026. Source: LaLiga EA Sports
Rules for classification: 1) Points; 2) Head-to-head points; 3) Head-to-head goal difference; 4) Goal difference; 5) Goals scored; 6) Fair-play points (if three or more teams tied); 7) Play-off at neutral site.
(Note: Head-to-head record is used only after all the matches between the teams in question have been played)

==== Results summary ====
| Overall | | | | | | | | Home | | | | | | Away | | | | | |
| Pld | W | D | L | GF | GA | GD | Pts | W | D | L | GF | GA | GD | W | D | L | GF | GA | GD |
|---|---|---|---|---|---|---|---|---|---|---|---|---|---|---|---|---|---|---|---|
| 13 | 11 | 0 | 2 | 33 | 11 | +22 | 33 | 6 | 0 | 0 | 19 | 4 | +15 | 5 | 0 | 2 | 14 | 7 | +7 |

Last updated: 21 November 2026.
Source: La Liga

==== Results by round ====
| Round | 1 | 2 | 3 | 4 | 5 | 6 | 7 | 8 | 9 | 10 | 11 | 12 | 13 | 14 | 15 | 16 | 17 | 18 | 19 | 20 | 21 | 22 | 23 | 24 | 25 | 26 | 27 | 28 | 29 | 30 | 31 | 32 | 33 | 34 | 35 | 36 | 37 | 38 |
|---|---|---|---|---|---|---|---|---|---|---|---|---|---|---|---|---|---|---|---|---|---|---|---|---|---|---|---|---|---|---|---|---|---|---|---|---|---|---|
| Ground | A | H | H | A | H | A | A | H | H | A | A | A | H | H | A | A | H | A | H | H | A | H | A | H | A | H | A | H | A | H | A | A | H | A | H | H | A | H |
| Result | W | W | W | L | W | W | L | W | W | W | W | W | W | | | | | | | | | | | | | | | | | | | | | | | | | |
| Position | 6 | 2 | 2 | 3 | 2 | 2 | 4 | 4 | 3 | 3 | 3 | 2 | 2 | | | | | | | | | | | | | | | | | | | | | | | | | |

Updated to match(es) played on 22 November 2026. Source: La Liga
A = Away; H = Home; W = Win; D = Draw; L = Loss

==== Matches ====
The league fixtures were announced on 30 June 2026.

| 22 August 2026 1 | Espanyol | 1–2 | Real Madrid | Cornellà de Llobregat |
| 21:30 UTC+2 | Calatrava 30' | Report | Bellingham 9'; Espí 90' | Stadium: RCDE Stadium; Attendance: 33,304; Referee: José María Sánchez Martínez |

| 26 August 2026 2 | Real Madrid | 4–1 | Real Sociedad | Madrid |
| 21:00 UTC+2 | Mbappé 40', 60', 80'; Vinícius 68' | Report | Sučić 44' | Stadium: Bernabéu; Attendance: 72,226; Referee: Mateo Busquets Ferrer |
Note: The match date was pushed back due to the clubs' player's involvement in the 2026 FIFA World Cup.

| 30 August 2026 3 | Real Madrid | 4–0 | Málaga | Madrid |
| 17:00 UTC+2 | Bellingham 19'; Herrero 26' (o.g.); Mbappé 30'; Güler 90+1' | Report | | Stadium: Bernabéu; Attendance: 74,799; Referee: Juan Martínez Munuera |

| 4 September 2026 4 | Real Betis | 1–0 | Real Madrid | Seville |
| 21:00 UTC+2 | Parrott 81' | Report | | Stadium: La Cartuja; Attendance: 66,046; Referee: Alejandro Hernández Hernández |

| 12 September 2026 5 | Real Madrid | 4–1 | Rayo Vallecano | Madrid |
| 21:00 UTC+2 | Mbappé 14' (pen.), 90+1'; Carreras 17'; Bellingham 35' | Report | Camello 51' | Stadium: Bernabéu; Attendance: 71,898; Referee: Víctor García Verdura |

| 15 September 2026 6 | Elche | 2–3 | Real Madrid | Elche |
| 21:30 UTC+2 | Osorio 71'; Niño 83' | Report | Dituro 25' (o.g.); Mbappé 33'; Espí 90+1' | Stadium: Martínez Valero; Attendance: 30,383; Referee: Jesús Gil Manzano |

| 20 September 2026 7 | Atlético Madrid | 2–1 | Real Madrid | Madrid |
| 16:15 UTC+2 | Grimaldo 53' (pen.); David 59' | Report | Huijsen (red card) 52'; Rüdiger 89' | Stadium: Riyadh Air Metropolitano; Attendance: 70,514; Referee: Miguel Ángel Ortiz Arias |

| 10 October 2026 8 | Real Madrid | 1–0 | Villarreal | Madrid |
| 21:00 UTC+2 | Diomande 62'; Vinícius (red card) 73' | Report | | Stadium: Bernabéu; Attendance: 75,242; Referee: Isidro Díaz de Mera Escuderos |

| 18 October 2026 9 | Real Madrid | 4–1 | Sevilla | Madrid |
| 21:00 UTC+2 | Güler 30'; Mbappé 37', 63' (pen.); Diomande 82' | Report | Bueno 80' | Stadium: Bernabéu; Attendance: 73,907; Referee: Mateo Busquets Ferrer |

| 25 October 2026 10 | Barcelona | 1–2 | Real Madrid | Barcelona |
| 21:00 UTC+1 | Raphinha 61' | Report | Mbappé 41', 87' | Stadium: Spotify Camp Nou; Attendance: 62,055; Referee: Juan Martínez Munuera |

| 1 November 2026 11 | Racing Santander | 0–3 | Real Madrid | Santander |
| 16:15 UTC+1 | | Report | Mbappé 11' (pen.); Bellingham 21'; Diomande 36' | Stadium: El Sardinero; Attendance: 22,892; Referee: José Luis Munuera Montero |

| 7 November 2026 12 | Valencia | 0–3 | Real Madrid | Valencia |
| 21:00 UTC+1 | Gayà (red card) 79' | Report | Valverde 28'; Güler 36'; Mbappé 75' | Stadium: Mestalla; Attendance: 47,914; Referee: Francisco Hernández Maeso |

| 21 November 2026 13 | Real Madrid | 2–1 | Celta Vigo | Madrid |
| 21:00 UTC+1 | Bellingham 66'; Espí 85' | Report | Durán 6' | Stadium: Bernabéu; Attendance: 74,241; Referee: Adrián Cordero Vega |

| 28 November 2026 14 | Real Madrid | v | Alavés | Madrid |
| 21:00 UTC+1 | | Report | | Stadium: Bernabéu |

| 2 December 2026 15 | Real Sociedad | v | Real Madrid | San Sebastián |
| 19:00 UTC+1 | | Report | | Stadium: Anoeta |
Note: The match date was pushed forward due to both clubs' involvement in the 2027 Supercopa de España.

| 6 December 2026 16 | Athletic Bilbao | v | Real Madrid | Bilbao |
| 16:15 UTC+1 | | Report | | Stadium: San Mamés |

| 13 December 2026 17 | Real Madrid | v | Osasuna | Madrid |
| --:-- UTC+1 | | Report | | Stadium: Bernabéu |

| 20 December 2026 18 | Deportivo A Coruña | v | Real Madrid | A Coruña |
| --:-- UTC+1 | | Report | | Stadium: ABANCA-Riazor |

| 3 January 2027 19 | Real Madrid | v | Getafe | Madrid |
| --:-- UTC+1 | | Report | | Stadium: Bernabéu |

| 10 January 2027 20 | Real Madrid | v | Levante | Madrid |
| --:-- UTC+1 | | Report | | Stadium: Bernabéu |

| 17 January 2027 21 | Málaga | v | Real Madrid | Málaga |
| --:-- UTC+1 | | Report | | Stadium: La Rosaleda |

| 24 January 2027 22 | Real Madrid | v | Real Betis | Madrid |
| --:-- UTC+1 | | Report | | Stadium: Bernabéu |

| 31 January 2027 23 | Rayo Vallecano | v | Real Madrid | Madrid |
| --:-- UTC+1 | | Report | | Stadium: Vallecas |

| 14 February 2027 24 | Real Madrid | v | Athletic Bilbao | Madrid |
| --:-- UTC+1 | | Report | | Stadium: Bernabéu |

| 21 February 2027 25 | Sevilla | v | Real Madrid | Seville |
| --:-- UTC+1 | | Report | | Stadium: Ramón Sánchez-Pizjuán |

| 28 February 2027 26 | Real Madrid | v | Valencia | Madrid |
| --:-- UTC+1 | | Report | | Stadium: Bernabéu |

| 7 March 2027 27 | Villarreal | v | Real Madrid | Villarreal |
| --:-- UTC+1 | | Report | | Stadium: La Cerámica |

| 14 March 2027 28 | Real Madrid | v | Espanyol | Madrid |
| --:-- UTC+1 | | Report | | Stadium: Bernabéu |

| 21 March 2027 29 | Celta Vigo | v | Real Madrid | Vigo |
| --:-- UTC+1 | | Report | | Stadium: ABANCA Balaídos |

| 4 April 2027 30 | Real Madrid | v | Atlético Madrid | Madrid |
| --:-- UTC+2 | | Report | | Stadium: Bernabéu |

| 11 April 2027 31 | Osasuna | v | Real Madrid | Pamplona |
| --:-- UTC+2 | | Report | | Stadium: El Sadar |

| 18 April 2027 32 | Getafe | v | Real Madrid | Getafe |
| --:-- UTC+2 | | Report | | Stadium: Coliseum |

| 21 April 2027 33 | Real Madrid | v | Elche | Madrid |
| --:-- UTC+2 | | Report | | Stadium: Bernabéu |

| 2 May 2027 34 | Levante | v | Real Madrid | Valencia |
| --:-- UTC+2 | | Report | | Stadium: Ciutat de València |

| 9 May 2027 35 | Real Madrid | v | Barcelona | Madrid |
| --:-- UTC+2 | | Report | | Stadium: Bernabéu |

| 16 May 2027 36 | Real Madrid | v | Racing Santander | Madrid |
| --:-- UTC+2 | | Report | | Stadium: Bernabéu |

| 23 May 2027 37 | Alavés | v | Real Madrid | Vitoria-Gasteiz |
| --:-- UTC+2 | | Report | | Stadium: Mendizorrotza |

| 30 May 2027 38 | Real Madrid | v | Deportivo A Coruña | Madrid |
| --:-- UTC+2 | | Report | | Stadium: Bernabéu |

=== Copa del Rey ===
Madrid will enter the tournament in the round of 32, as they qualified for the 2027 Supercopa de España.

=== Supercopa de España ===
| 3 February 2027 Semi-finals | Real Sociedad | v | Real Madrid | Istanbul, Turkey |
| 22:00 UTC+3 | | | | Stadium: Beşiktaş Stadium |

=== UEFA Champions League ===
==== League phase ====
The league phase draw was held on 27 August 2026.

| Pos | Team | Pld | W | D | L | GF | GA | GD | Pts | Qualification |
|---|---|---|---|---|---|---|---|---|---|---|
| 1 | (France) Paris Saint-Germain | 4 | 4 | 0 | 0 | 20 | 5 | +15 | 12 | Advance to round of 16 (seeded) |
| 2 | (Spain) Real Madrid | 4 | 4 | 0 | 0 | 13 | 7 | +6 | 12 | Advance to round of 16 (seeded) |
| 3 | (England) Arsenal | 4 | 3 | 1 | 0 | 8 | 3 | +5 | 10 | Advance to round of 16 (seeded) |
| 4 | (Italy) Como | 4 | 3 | 0 | 1 | 19 | 6 | +13 | 9 | Advance to round of 16 (seeded) |
| 5 | (Spain) Barcelona | 4 | 3 | 0 | 1 | 14 | 6 | +8 | 9 | Advance to round of 16 (seeded) |

Updated to match(es) played on 4 November 2026. Source: UEFA
Rules for classification: League phase tiebreakers

| Overall | | | | | | | | Home | | | | | | Away | | | | | |
| Pld | W | D | L | GF | GA | GD | Pts | W | D | L | GF | GA | GD | W | D | L | GF | GA | GD |
|---|---|---|---|---|---|---|---|---|---|---|---|---|---|---|---|---|---|---|---|
| 4 | 4 | 0 | 0 | 13 | 7 | +6 | 12 | 2 | 0 | 0 | 6 | 2 | +4 | 2 | 0 | 0 | 7 | 5 | +2 |

Last updated: 4 November 2026.
Source: UEFA

| Round | 1 | 2 | 3 | 4 | 5 | 6 | 7 | 8 |
|---|---|---|---|---|---|---|---|---|
| Ground | H | A | H | A | H | A | H | A |
| Result | W | W | W | W | | | | |
| Position | 13 | 8 | 4 | 2 | | | | |

Updated to match(es) played on 4 November 2026. Source: UEFA
A = Away; H = Home; W = Win; D = Draw; L = Loss

| 8 September 2026 1 | Real Madrid (Spain) | 2–1 | (Italy) Inter Milan | Madrid, Spain |
| 21:00 UTC+2 | Mbappé 14'; Valverde 23' | Report | Carlos Augusto 77' | Stadium: Bernabéu; Attendance: 74,858; Referee: Michael Oliver (England) |

| 14 October 2026 2 | Roma (Italy) | 3–4 | (Spain) Real Madrid | Rome, Italy |
| 21:00 UTC+2 | De Roon 20'; Malen 51', 57' | Report | Mbappé 25'; Espí 82'; Endrick 85'; Rüdiger 90' | Stadium: Stadio Olimpico; Attendance: 64,256; Referee: François Letexier (France) |

| 21 October 2026 3 | Real Madrid (Spain) | 4–1 | (Germany) RB Leipzig | Madrid, Spain |
| 21:00 UTC+2 | Silva 44'; Güler 52'; Mbappé 83'; Diomande 87' | Report | Gomis 85' | Stadium: Bernabéu; Attendance: 73,016; Referee: István Kovács (Romania) |

| 4 November 2026 4 | AEK Athens (Greece) | 2–3 | (Spain) Real Madrid | Athens, Greece |
| 19:45 UTC+2 | Koïta 12', (red card) 90+5'; Pilios 75' | Report | Bellingham 32'; Mbappé 78'; Valverde 90+2' | Stadium: Agia Sophia Stadium; Attendance: 30,368; Referee: Maurizio Mariani (Italy) |

| 24 November 2026 5 | Real Madrid (Spain) | v | (Netherlands) PSV Eindhoven | Madrid, Spain |
| 21:00 UTC+1 | | Report | | Stadium: Bernabéu; Referee: Espen Eskås (Norway) |

| 9 December 2026 6 | Arsenal (England) | v | (Spain) Real Madrid | London, England |
| 20:00 UTC+0 | | Report | | Stadium: Emirates Stadium |

| 19 January 2027 7 | Real Madrid (Spain) | v | (Austria) LASK | Madrid, Spain |
| 21:00 UTC+1 | | Report | | Stadium: Bernabéu |

| 27 January 2027 8 | Shakhtar Donetsk (Ukraine) | v | (Spain) Real Madrid | London, England |
| 20:00 UTC+0 | | Report | | Stadium: Stamford Bridge (Note: Due to the Russian invasion of Ukraine, Ukrainian teams are required to play their home matches at neutral venues until further notice. Therefore, Shakhtar Donetsk will play their home match at Stamford Bridge, London, England, instead of their regular stadium, the Donbas Arena in Donetsk.) |

== Statistics ==
=== Squad statistics ===
| No. | Pos | Nat | Player | Total | | La Liga | | Copa del Rey | | Champions League | | Supercopa de España | |
| No. | Pos | Nat | Player | Apps | Goals | Apps | Goals | Apps | Goals | Apps | Goals | Apps | Goals |
|---|---|---|---|---|---|---|---|---|---|---|---|---|---|
| 1 | GK | (Belgium) | Thibaut Courtois | 16 | 0 | 12 | 0 | 0 | 0 | 4 | 0 | 0 | 0 |
| 2 | DF | (Spain) | Raúl Asencio | 0 | 0 | 0 | 0 | 0 | 0 | 0 | 0 | 0 | 0 |
| 3 | DF | (Brazil) | Éder Militão | 2 | 0 | 1 | 0 | 0 | 0 | 1 | 0 | 0 | 0 |
| 4 | DF | (Spain) | Dean Huijsen | 13 | 0 | 11 | 0 | 0 | 0 | 2 | 0 | 0 | 0 |
| 5 | MF | (England) | Jude Bellingham | 17 | 6 | 13 | 5 | 0 | 0 | 4 | 1 | 0 | 0 |
| 6 | MF | (France) | Eduardo Camavinga | 14 | 0 | 12 | 0 | 0 | 0 | 2 | 0 | 0 | 0 |
| 7 | FW | (Brazil) | Vinícius Júnior | 13 | 1 | 9 | 1 | 0 | 0 | 4 | 0 | 0 | 0 |
| 8 | MF | (Uruguay) | Federico Valverde | 16 | 3 | 12 | 1 | 0 | 0 | 4 | 2 | 0 | 0 |
| 9 | FW | (Brazil) | Endrick | 8 | 1 | 5 | 0 | 0 | 0 | 3 | 1 | 0 | 0 |
| 10 | FW | (France) | Kylian Mbappé | 17 | 17 | 13 | 13 | 0 | 0 | 4 | 4 | 0 | 0 |
| 11 | FW | (Brazil) | Rodrygo | 0 | 0 | 0 | 0 | 0 | 0 | 0 | 0 | 0 | 0 |
| 12 | DF | (England) | Trent Alexander-Arnold | 9 | 0 | 8 | 0 | 0 | 0 | 1 | 0 | 0 | 0 |
| 13 | GK | (Ukraine) | Andriy Lunin | 1 | 0 | 1 | 0 | 0 | 0 | 0 | 0 | 0 | 0 |
| 14 | MF | (France) | Aurélien Tchouaméni | 10 | 0 | 8 | 0 | 0 | 0 | 2 | 0 | 0 | 0 |
| 15 | MF | (Turkey) | Arda Güler | 15 | 4 | 13 | 3 | 0 | 0 | 2 | 1 | 0 | 0 |
| 16 | DF | (France) | Ibrahima Konaté | 14 | 0 | 12 | 0 | 0 | 0 | 2 | 0 | 0 | 0 |
| 17 | DF | (Spain) | Marc Cucurella | 17 | 0 | 13 | 0 | 0 | 0 | 4 | 0 | 0 | 0 |
| 18 | DF | (Spain) | Álvaro Carreras | 10 | 1 | 6 | 1 | 0 | 0 | 4 | 0 | 0 | 0 |
| 19 | FW | (Spain) | Carlos Espí | 12 | 4 | 8 | 3 | 0 | 0 | 4 | 1 | 0 | 0 |
| 20 | MF | (Portugal) | Bernardo Silva | 14 | 1 | 11 | 0 | 0 | 0 | 3 | 1 | 0 | 0 |
| 21 | FW | (Morocco) | Brahim Díaz | 9 | 0 | 6 | 0 | 0 | 0 | 3 | 0 | 0 | 0 |
| 22 | DF | (Germany) | Antonio Rüdiger | 7 | 2 | 4 | 1 | 0 | 0 | 3 | 1 | 0 | 0 |
| 23 | DF | (France) | Ferland Mendy | 0 | 0 | 0 | 0 | 0 | 0 | 0 | 0 | 0 | 0 |
| 24 | DF | (Netherlands) | Denzel Dumfries | 11 | 0 | 8 | 0 | 0 | 0 | 3 | 0 | 0 | 0 |
| 25 | FW | (Ivory Coast) | Yan Diomande | 17 | 4 | 13 | 3 | 0 | 0 | 4 | 1 | 0 | 0 |
| 27 | MF | (Spain) | Thiago Pitarch | 1 | 0 | 1 | 0 | 0 | 0 | 0 | 0 | 0 | 0 |

Last updated: 21 November 2026
Source: FBREF

=== Goals ===
As of 21 November 2026

| Rank | Player | La Liga | CdR | UCL | Supercopa | Total |
|---|---|---|---|---|---|---|
| 1 | (France) Kylian Mbappé | 13 | 0 | 4 | 0 | 17 |
| 2 | (England) Jude Bellingham | 5 | 0 | 1 | 0 | 6 |
| 3 | (Ivory Coast) Yan Diomande | 3 | 0 | 1 | 0 | 4 |
| 3 | (Spain) Carlos Espí | 3 | 0 | 1 | 0 | 4 |
| 3 | (Turkey) Arda Güler | 3 | 0 | 1 | 0 | 4 |
| 6 | (Uruguay) Federico Valverde | 1 | 0 | 2 | 0 | 3 |
| 7 | (Germany) Antonio Rüdiger | 1 | 0 | 1 | 0 | 2 |
| 8 | (Spain) Álvaro Carreras | 1 | 0 | 0 | 0 | 1 |
| 8 | (Brazil) Endrick | 0 | 0 | 1 | 0 | 1 |
| 8 | (Portugal) Bernardo Silva | 0 | 0 | 1 | 0 | 1 |
| 8 | (Brazil) Vinícius Júnior | 1 | 0 | 0 | 0 | 1 |
| Own goals | | 2 | 0 | 0 | 0 | 2 |
| Total | | 33 | 0 | 13 | 0 | 46 |

Source: FBREF

=== Hat-tricks ===
| Player | Against | Minutes | Score after goals | Result | Date | Competition |
|---|---|---|---|---|---|---|
| (France) Kylian Mbappé | Real Sociedad | 40', 60', 80' | 1–0, 2–1, 4–1 | 4–1 (H) | 26 August 2026 | La Liga |

=== Clean sheets ===
As of 21 November 2026

| Rank | Player | La Liga | CdR | UCL | Supercopa | Total |
|---|---|---|---|---|---|---|
| 1 | (Belgium) Thibaut Courtois | 4 | 0 | 0 | 0 | 4 |
| 2 | (Ukraine) Andriy Lunin | 0 | 0 | 0 | 0 | 0 |
| Total | | 4 | 0 | 0 | 0 | 4 |

Source: FBREF

=== Disciplinary record ===
| N | P | Nat. | Name | La Liga | | | CdR | | | UCL | | | Supercopa | | | Total | | | Notes |
| N | P | Nat. | Name | Yellow card | Second yellow card | Red card | Yellow card | Second yellow card | Red card | Yellow card | Second yellow card | Red card | Yellow card | Second yellow card | Red card | Yellow card | Second yellow card | Red card | Notes |
| 4 | DF | (Spain) | Dean Huijsen | 1 | | 1 | | | | 1 | | | | | | 2 | | 1 | |
| 7 | FW | (Brazil) | Vinícius Júnior | 2 | | 1 | | | | | | | | | | 2 | | 1 | |
| 10 | FW | (France) | Kylian Mbappé | 3 | | | | | | | | | | | | 3 | | | |
| 16 | DF | (France) | Ibrahima Konaté | 3 | | | | | | | | | | | | 3 | | | |
| 17 | DF | (Spain) | Marc Cucurella | 2 | | | | | | 1 | | | | | | 3 | | | |
| 18 | DF | (Spain) | Álvaro Carreras | 1 | | | | | | 2 | | | | | | 3 | | | |
| 5 | MF | (England) | Jude Bellingham | 2 | | | | | | | | | | | | 2 | | | |
| 6 | MF | (France) | Eduardo Camavinga | 2 | | | | | | | | | | | | 2 | | | |
| 14 | MF | (France) | Aurélien Tchouaméni | 2 | | | | | | | | | | | | 2 | | | |
| 25 | FW | (Ivory Coast) | Yan Diomande | 2 | | | | | | | | | | | | 2 | | | |
| 13 | GK | (Ukraine) | Andriy Lunin | 1 | | | | | | | | | | | | 1 | | | |
| 15 | MF | (Turkey) | Arda Güler | 1 | | | | | | | | | | | | 1 | | | |
| 18 | DF | (Germany) | Antonio Rüdiger | 1 | | | | | | | | | | | | 1 | | | |
| 19 | FW | (Spain) | Carlos Espí | 1 | | | | | | | | | | | | 1 | | | |
| 24 | DF | (Netherlands) | Denzel Dumfries | 1 | | | | | | | | | | | | 1 | | | |

Last updated: 21 November 2026
Source: FBREF
Ordered by (red card) , (second yellow card) and (yellow card)
(yellow card) = Number of bookings; (second yellow card) = Number of sending offs after a second yellow card; (red card) = Number of sending offs by a direct red card.

== Awards ==
=== Monthly awards ===
==== La Liga awards ====
| Award | Month | Player / Coach | Ref. |
|---|---|---|---|
| Coach of the Month | October | (Portugal) José Mourinho | |
| Player of the Month | October | (France) Kylian Mbappé | |

==== Mahou awards ====
| Award | Month | Player | Ref. |
|---|---|---|---|
| Player of the Month | August | (France) Kylian Mbappé | |
| Player of the Month | September | (Turkey) Arda Güler | |
| Player of the Month | October | (England) Jude Bellingham | |

=== Annual Awards ===
| Award | Player(s) / Coach | Ref. |
|---|---|---|
| FIFPRO Men's World 11 | (England) Jude Bellingham (France) Kylian Mbappé | |
