= Carlos Espí =

Spanish footballer (born 2005)

Personal information
- Full name: Carlos Espí Escrihuela
- Date of birth: 24 July 2005 (age 21)
- Place of birth: Tavernes de la Valldigna, Spain
- Height: 1.94 m (6 ft 4 in)
- Position: Striker

Team information
- Current team: Real Madrid
- Number: 19

Youth career
- 2011–2020: Tavernes
- 2020–2022: Alzira
- 2022–2024: Levante

Senior career*
Years	Team	Apps	(Gls)
2022	Alzira B	1	(0)
2023–2024	Levante B	15	(4)
2024–2026	Levante	63	(18)
2026–	Real Madrid	8	(3)

International career^{‡}
2024	Spain U19	2	(2)
2025	Spain U20	2	(0)
2026–	Spain U21	4	(5)
- * Club domestic league appearances and goals as of 22:03, 21 November 2026 (UTC) ‡ National team caps and goals as of 12:21, 14 November 2026 (UTC)

Carlos Espí Escrihuela (born 24 July 2005) is a Spanish professional footballer who plays as a striker for La Liga club Real Madrid.

Espí developed through the youth system of Levante and made his first-team debut in 2024. After establishing himself with the senior side and being named La Liga's best under-23 player, he joined Real Madrid in 2026.

Espí has represented Spain at under-19, under-20 and under-21 level.

== Club career ==
=== Early career ===
Born in Tavernes de la Valldigna, Valencian Community, Espí began his career with hometown side Tavernes at the age of six. In 2020, he joined Alzira, where he spent two seasons playing mainly for their Cadete and Juvenil squads. In that club, he also made his senior debut with the B-team, playing the last 19 minutes of a 1–0 Segunda Regional Valenciana home win over Barxeta.

=== Levante ===
Espí joined Levante's youth setup in 2022, initially for the Juvenil team. He made his debut with the reserves on 19 November 2023, coming on as a late substitute in a 0–0 Tercera Federación home draw against Rayo Ibense.

Espí scored his first senior goal on 29 November 2023, netting the B's opener in a 2–1 home success over Silla; it was also his first senior start. He made his first team debut the following 18 February, replacing Mohamed Bouldini late into a 0–0 Segunda División away draw against Racing de Ferrol.

Espí scored his first professional goal on 26 May 2024, netting his team's second in a 2–2 home draw against Alcorcón. He was regularly used in the main squad during the 2024–25 season, scoring six times as the club returned to La Liga after three years.

Espí made his debut in the main category of Spanish football on 23 August 2025, playing the last 15 minutes in a 3–2 home loss to Barcelona. He scored his first goal in the division the following 4 January, netting his team's second in a 3–0 win at Sevilla.

On 24 February 2026, Espí renewed his link with the Granotes until 2028, and scored a brace in a 2–0 home success over Alavés three days later. He scored five goals in the following five matches, including another double in a 4–2 win over Real Oviedo. He concluded the 2025–26 season as his club's top scorer with 11 goals.

=== Real Madrid ===
On 30 July 2026, Espí signed for La Liga club Real Madrid on a contract until 30 June 2031, becoming the biggest sale in Levante's history in a deal reportedly worth a €25 million release clause. A month later, on 22 August, he scored his first goal on his debut, securing a 2–1 away victory over Espanyol. On 14 October, he scored his first UEFA Champions League goal, equalising the score at 3–3 as Madrid came from 1–3 down to defeat Roma 4–3 away from home.

== International career ==
On 13 February 2024, Espí was called up to the Spain national under-19 team for two friendlies against Norway. He featured in both matches, scoring twice in the first one.

== Career statistics ==
As of match played 21 November 2026

Appearances and goals by club, season and competition
Club	Season	League			Copa del Rey		Europe		Other		Total	
Club	Season	Division	Apps	Goals	Apps	Goals	Apps	Goals	Apps	Goals	Apps	Goals
Alzira B	2021–22	Segunda Regional Valenciana	1	0	—		—		—		1	0
Atlético Levante	2023–24	Tercera Federación	15	4	—		—		—		15	4
Levante	2023–24	Segunda División	2	1	—		—		—		2	1
Levante	2024–25	Segunda División	36	6	1	0	—		—		37	6
Levante	2025–26	La Liga	25	11	2	2	—		—		27	13
Levante	Total		63	18	3	2	—		—		66	20
Real Madrid	2026–27	La Liga	8	3	0	0	4 (Note: Appearances in UEFA Champions League)	1	0	0	12	4
Career total			87	25	3	2	4	1	0	0	94	28

== Honours ==
Levante

- Segunda División: 2024–25

Individual

- La Liga Player of the Month: March 2026
- La Liga U23 Player of the Season: 2025–26
