= Adrián de la Fuente =

Spanish footballer (born 1999)

Personal information
- Full name: Adrián de la Fuente Barquilla
- Date of birth: 26 February 1999 (age 27)
- Place of birth: El Escorial, Spain
- Height: 1.79 m (5 ft 10 in)
- Position: Centre-back

Team information
- Current team: Levante
- Number: 4

Youth career
- 2006–2007: Collado Villalba
- 2007–2018: Real Madrid

Senior career*
Years	Team	Apps	(Gls)
2018–2020	Real Madrid B	42	(2)
2020–2023	Villarreal B	88	(6)
2021–2023	Villarreal	0	(0)
2023–	Levante	100	(10)

International career
2017–2018	Spain U19	4	(1)
- * Club domestic league appearances and goals as of 23 May 2026

Adrián de la Fuente Barquilla (born 26 February 1999), sometimes known as Dela, is a Spanish footballer who plays as a central defender for Levante UD.

== Club career ==
Born in El Escorial, Community of Madrid, de la Fuente joined Real Madrid's La Fábrica in 2007, from CU Collado Villalba. On 10 January 2018, while still a youth, he signed a professional contract until 2022.

Promoted to the reserves in Segunda División B ahead of the 2018–19 season, de la Fuente made his senior debut on 26 August 2018, starting in a 2–0 home win over UD Las Palmas Atlético. Initially a regular starter in Santiago Solari's side, he lost his starting spot after the appointment of Raúl as manager.

On 14 September 2020, de la Fuente moved to another reserve team, after signing a three-year contract with Villarreal CF B also in the third division. He made his first team debut on 30 November of the following year, starting in a 8–0 away routing of Victoria CF, for the season's Copa del Rey.

De la Fuente made his professional debut with the B-side on 14 August 2022, starting in a 2–0 away win over Racing de Santander. He scored his first professional goal on 3 September, netting the B's opener in a 3–0 home win over CD Mirandés.

On 29 June 2023, de la Fuente signed a three-year contract with fellow second division side Levante UD.

== Career statistics ==
As of match played 23 May 2026

Appearances and goals by club, season and competition
Club	Season	League			National cup		Continental		Other		Total	
Club	Season	Division	Apps	Goals	Apps	Goals	Apps	Goals	Apps	Goals	Apps	Goals
Real Madrid B	2018–19	Segunda División B	28	1	—		—		0	0	28	1
Real Madrid B	2019–20	Segunda División B	14	1	—		—		—		14	1
Real Madrid B	Total		42	2	—		—		—		42	2
Villarreal B	2020–21	Segunda División B	13	0	—		—		5	0	18	0
Villarreal B	2021–22	Primera División RFEF	35	4	—		—		2	1	37	5
Villarreal B	2022–23	Segunda División	35	2	—		—		—		35	2
Villarreal B	Total		83	6	—		—		7	1	90	7
Villarreal	2021–22	La Liga	0	0	1	0	—		—		1	0
Villarreal	2022–23	La Liga	—		—		5	0	—		5	0
Villarreal	Total		0	0	1	0	5	0	—		6	0
Levante	2023–24	Segunda División	35	5	2	0	—		—		37	5
Levante	2024–25	Segunda División	32	2	1	0	—		—		33	2
Levante	2025–26	La Liga	33	3	2	0	—		—		35	3
Levante	Total		100	10	5	0	—		—		105	10
Career total			225	18	6	0	5	0	7	1	243	19

== Honours ==
Levante

- Segunda División: 2024–25
