= Andrés García (footballer, born 2003) =

Spanish footballer

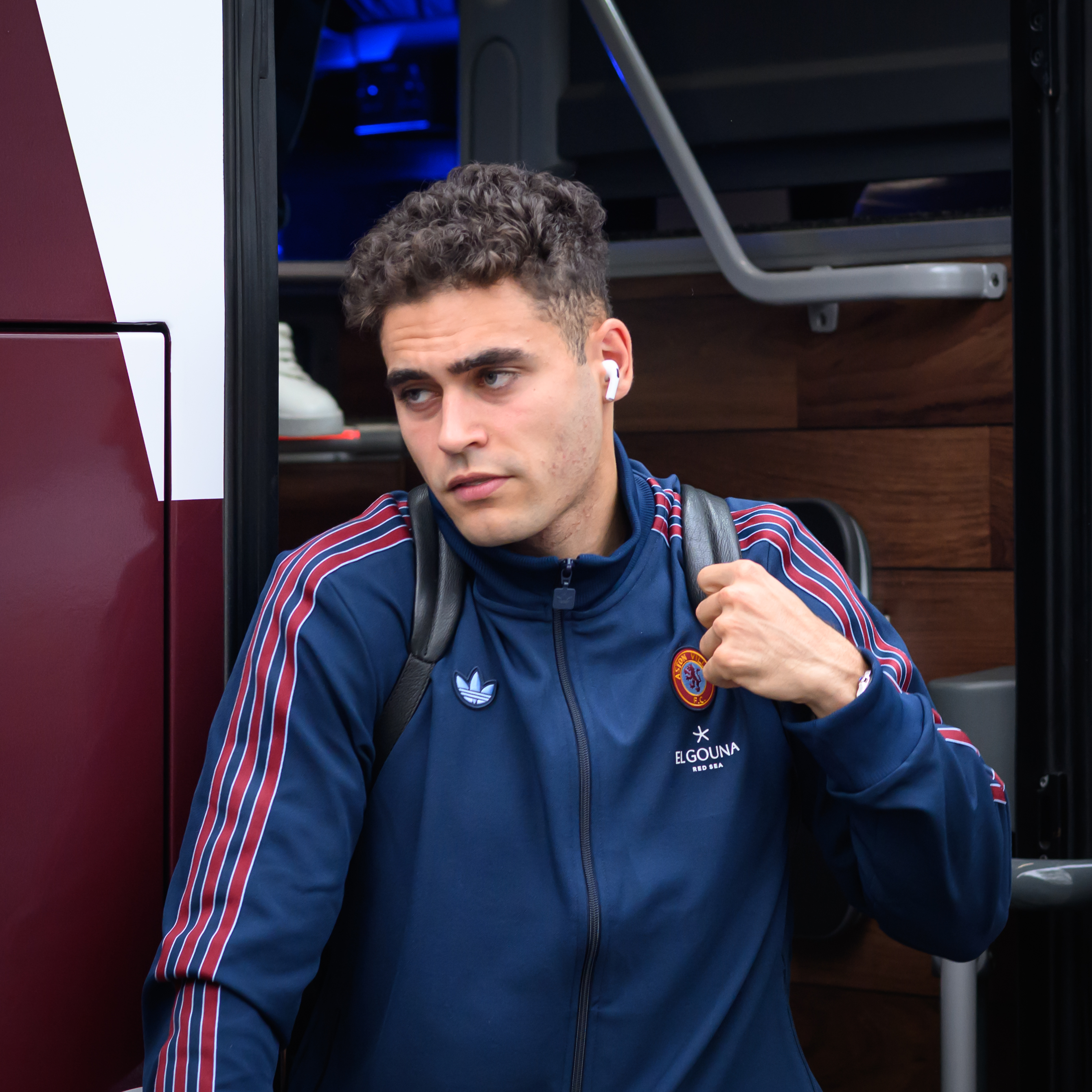
- García with Aston Villa in 2026

Personal information
- Full name: Andrés García Robledo
- Date of birth: 7 February 2003 (age 23)
- Place of birth: Villar del Arzobispo, Spain
- Height: 1.85 m (6 ft 1 in)
- Positions: Right-back; winger

Team information
- Current team: Getafe (on loan from Aston Villa)
- Number: 21

Youth career
- 2017–2020: Inter San José
- 2020–2021: Torre Levante
- 2021–2022: Levante

Senior career*
Years	Team	Apps	(Gls)
2022–2023	Levante B	31	(1)
2023–2025	Levante	47	(4)
2025–	Aston Villa	13	(0)
2026–	→ Getafe (loan)	7	(0)

International career^{‡}
2025	Spain U21	3	(0)
- * Club domestic league appearances and goals as of 14 October 2026 ‡ National team caps and goals as of 14:21, 20 June 2025 (UTC)

Andrés García Robledo (born 7 February 2003) is a Spanish professional footballer who plays as a right-back or a winger for La Liga club Getafe, on loan from Premier League club Aston Villa.

== Club career ==
=== Levante ===
Born in Villar del Arzobispo, García joined Levante's youth setup in 2021, after representing Torre Levante and Inter San José. In July 2022, he was promoted to the reserves in the Tercera Federación.

García made his senior debut with the B-team on 10 September 2022, starting in a 1–0 home loss against Torrent, and scored his first goal on 6 November by netting the winner in a 1–0 home success over Elche Ilicitano. He made his first team debut the following 3 January, coming on as a late substitute for Álex Cantero in a 3–2 home win over Getafe, for the season's Copa del Rey.

On 22 July 2023, García renewed his contract with Levante for another year, with an option for a further three seasons. He suffered an injury in September which sidelined him for three months, before establishing himself as a right-back.

García scored his first professional goal on 26 May 2024, netting the opener in a 2–2 home draw against Alcorcón.

=== Aston Villa ===
On 21 January 2025, 21-year-old García signed for Premier League club Aston Villa for an undisclosed fee, reported to be around £6 million. On 1 February 2025, García made his Premier League debut in a 2–0 defeat to Wolverhampton Wanderers.

On 16 July 2026, García signed for La Liga club Getafe on a season-long loan deal.

== International career ==
In March 2025, Garcia received a Spain U21 call up for games against Czech Republic & Germany. He debuted during the 2–2 draw against Czech Republic on 21 March 2025.

== Career statistics ==
=== Club ===
As of match played 10 October 2026

Appearances and goals by club, season and competition
Club	Season	League			National cup (Note: Includes Copa del Rey, FA Cup)		League cup		Europe		Other		Total	
Club	Season	Division	Apps	Goals	Apps	Goals	Apps	Goals	Apps	Goals	Apps	Goals	Apps	Goals
Levante B	2022–23	Tercera Federación	31	1	0	0	—		—		—		31	1
Levante	2022–23	Segunda División	1	0	2	0	—		—		—		3	0
Levante	2023–24	Segunda División	24	1	0	0	—		—		—		24	1
Levante	2024–25	Segunda División	22	3	1	0	—		—		—		23	3
Levante	Total		47	4	3	0	—		—		—		50	4
Aston Villa	2024–25	Premier League	7	0	3	0	—		0	0	—		10	0
Aston Villa	2025–26	Premier League	6	0	1	0	0	0	1 (Note: Appearance in UEFA Europa League)	0	—		8	0
Aston Villa	2026–27	Premier League	0	0	0	0	0	0	0	0	—		0	0
Aston Villa	Total		13	0	4	0	0	0	1	0	—		18	0
Getafe (loan)	2026–27	La Liga	7	0	0	0	—		2 (Note: Appearance in UEFA Conference League)	1	—		9	1
Career total			98	5	7	0	0	0	3	1	0	0	108	6

== Honours ==
Levante

- Segunda División: 2024–25

Aston Villa

- UEFA Europa League: 2025–26
