= Borja Cortina =

Spanish footballer

Personal information
- Full name: Borja Cortina Carbonell
- Date of birth: 24 February 2006 (age 20)
- Place of birth: Valencia, Spain
- Height: 1.89 m (6 ft 2 in)
- Position: Centre-back

Team information
- Current team: Levante B
- Number: 26

Youth career
- Atlètic Amistat
- 2017–2020: Levante
- 2020–2021: Patacona
- 2021–2024: Levante

Senior career*
Years	Team	Apps	(Gls)
2024–	Levante B	3	(0)
2024–	Levante	1	(0)

International career
2021–2022	Spain U16	8	(0)
2022	Spain U17	2	(0)
- * Club domestic league appearances and goals as of 13 October 2024

Borja Cortina Carbonell (born 24 February 2006) is a Spanish footballer who plays as a centre-back for Atlético Levante UD.

== Club career ==
Born in Valencia, Cortina joined Levante UD's youth sides from local side Club Atlètic Amistat. On 4 July 2023, he renewed his contract with the club for three years.

Cortina was promoted to the reserves in Tercera Federación ahead of the 2024–25 season, and made his senior debut on 7 September 2024, starting in a 2–1 away win over CF La Nucía. He made his first team debut on 13 October, coming on as a late substitute for fellow youth graduate Marcos Navarro in a 1–0 Segunda División away loss to Racing de Santander.

== International career ==
Cortina represented Spain at under-16 and under-17 levels.
