= Alfonso Pastor =

Spanish footballer (born 2000)

Personal information
- Full name: Alfonso Pastor Vacas
- Date of birth: 4 October 2000 (age 26)
- Place of birth: Bujalance, Spain
- Height: 1.89 m (6 ft 2 in)
- Position: Goalkeeper

Team information
- Current team: Marítimo
- Number: 13

Youth career
- Bujalance
- Séneca
- 2013–2019: Sevilla

Senior career*
Years	Team	Apps	(Gls)
2019–2022	Sevilla B	48	(0)
2020–2024	Sevilla	0	(0)
2022–2023	→ Castellón (loan)	34	(0)
2024–2025	Levante	1	(0)
2025–2026	Rio Ave	0	(0)
2026–	Marítimo	1	(0)

International career
2017	Spain U17	1	(0)
- * Club domestic league appearances and goals as of 19 June 2026

Alfonso Pastor Vacas (born 4 October 2000) is a Spanish professional footballer who plays as a goalkeeper for Primeira Liga club Marítimo.

== Club career ==
Born in Bujalance, Seville, Andalusia, Pastor joined Sevilla FC's youth setup in 2013, after representing Séneca CF and AD FB de Bujalance. On 1 September 2018, while still a youth, he renewed his contract until 2021.

Pastor made his senior debut with the reserves on 30 March 2019, starting in a 1–0 Segunda División B home win against UD Almería B. Definitely promoted to the B-side for the 2019–20 campaign, he was mainly a first-choice as the season was curtailed due to the COVID-19 pandemic.

On 3 December 2020, as starter Bono tested positive to COVID-19 and immediate backup Tomáš Vaclík suffered an injury in the warm-up, Pastor made his first team debut by playing the full 90 minutes of a 4–0 home loss against Chelsea. He subsequently lost his starting spot to Javi Díaz at the B-side, before being loaned out to Primera Federación side CD Castellón on 16 August 2022.

On 17 January 2024, after spending the first half of the campaign unregistered, Pastor joined Levante UD on a short-term deal; despite being announced at the reserves, he never featured for the side, being only a third-choice behind Joan Femenías and Andrés Fernández with the main squad. On 4 July, he renewed his contract until 2026.

Pastor was a backup to Fernández during the 2024–25 campaign, featuring in one match as the Granotes achieved promotion to La Liga. On 1 September 2025, after the arrivals of Pablo Campos and Mathew Ryan, he terminated his link with the club and moved to Portugal, joining Primeira Liga side Rio Ave on a one-year contract.

On 2 February 2026, Pastor joined Liga Portugal 2 club Marítimo on a one-and-a-half year contract.

== International career ==
Pastor represented Spain at under-17 level in the 2017 FIFA U-17 World Cup, acting as a backup to Álvaro Fernández as his side finished second in the tournament.

== Honours ==
Levante

- Segunda División: 2024–25
