= Giorgi Kochorashvili =

Georgian footballer (born 1999)

Personal information
- Date of birth: 29 June 1999 (age 27)
- Place of birth: Tbilisi, Georgia
- Height: 1.78 m (5 ft 10 in)
- Position: Central midfielder

Team information
- Current team: Sevilla
- Number: 8

Youth career
- Saburtalo
- 2017–2018: → Girona (loan)

Senior career*
Years	Team	Apps	(Gls)
2017–2019	Saburtalo	2	(0)
2017–2019	→ Peralada (loan)	28	(0)
2019–2022	Levante B	44	(3)
2020–2025	Levante	63	(8)
2022–2023	→ Castellón (loan)	36	(4)
2025–2026	Sporting CP	18	(0)
2026–	Sevilla	8	(0)

International career^{‡}
2016–2017	Georgia U19	7	(0)
2019–2021	Georgia U21	4	(0)
2023–	Georgia	31	(4)
- * Club domestic league appearances and goals as of 21 November 2026 ‡ National team caps and goals as of 18 November 2026

Giorgi Kochorashvili (Order of Honor) (Georgian: გიორგი ქოჩორაშვილი, romanized: giorgi kochorashvili; born 29 June 1999) is a Georgian professional footballer who plays as a central midfielder for La Liga club Sevilla FC and the Georgia national team.

== Club career ==
=== Early career ===
Born in Tbilisi, Kochorashvili played youth football for Saburtalo Tbilisi. He made his first team debut on 23 July 2017, playing the last 16 minutes in a 2–1 home loss against Torpedo Kutaisi.

In August 2017, Kochorashvili was loaned to Girona FC for two years, and was assigned to the youth setup. On 26 June of the following year, after finishing his formation, he was assigned to the farm team in Segunda División B.

=== Levante ===
On 19 July 2019, after Girona's offer was rejected by Saburtalo, Kochorashvili signed a three-year contract with Levante UD, being immediately assigned to the reserves also in the third division. He made his first team – and La Liga – debut on 12 July of the following year, coming on as a late substitute for Rubén Rochina in a 2–1 home loss against Athletic Bilbao.

On 30 August 2022, Kochorashvili was loaned to Primera Federación side CD Castellón for the season. Upon returning in the following year, he renewed his contract until 2025, and subsequently became a regular starter for the Granotes.

=== Sporting CP ===
On 31 March 2025, Kochorashvili was confirmed as an addition of Portuguese side Sporting CP on a five-year contract, for a fee of € 5.5 million, after the club detailed the deals made in the winter transfer window. He was unveiled as a Sporting CP player on 6 July 2025.

=== Sevilla ===
On 21 August 2026, Kochorashvili returned to Spain and its top tier, after signing a four-year deal with Sevilla FC.

== International career ==
Kochorashvili represented Georgia at under-19, under-21 and absolute levels. He made a debut for the senior team on 12 September 2023 in a 2–1 loss to Norway.

Kochorashvili took part in both UEFA Euro 2024 play-off matches, converting from the spot in a penalty shoot-out against Greece on 26 March 2024.

In the summer of 2024, Kochorashvili was selected to represent Georgia in Euro 2024, which was the nation's first international tournament as an independent country. In the nation's first match against Turkey, Kochorashvili assisted Georges Mikautadze in the 32nd minute with a cross into the box – Georgia's first goal in an international tournament.

As Georgia kicked off their 2024–25 UEFA Nations League campaign in September 2024, Kochorashvili scored in first two matches, including a winner against Albania.

== Career statistics ==
=== Club ===
As of match played 21 November 2026

Appearances and goals by club, season and competition
Club	Season	League			National cup (Note: Includes Copa del Rey, Taça de Portugal)		League cup (Note: Includes Taça da Liga)		Continental		Other		Total	
Club	Season	Division	Apps	Goals	Apps	Goals	Apps	Goals	Apps	Goals	Apps	Goals	Apps	Goals
Saburtalo	2017	Erovnuli Liga	2	0	—		—		—		—		2	0
Peralada (loan)	2018–19	Segunda División B	28	0	—		—		—		—		28	0
Levante B	2019–20	Segunda División B	15	1	—		—		—		—		15	1
Levante B	2020–21	Segunda División B	16	0	—		—		—		—		16	0
Levante B	2021–22	Segunda Federación	13	2	—		—		—		—		13	2
Levante B	Total		44	3	—		—		—		—		44	3
Levante	2019–20	La Liga	1	0	—		—		—		—		1	0
Levante	2020–21	La Liga	3	0	2	1	—		—		—		5	1
Levante	2023–24	Segunda División	24	2	1	0	—		—		—		25	2
Levante	2024–25	Segunda División	35	6	0	0	—		—		—		35	6
Levante	Total		63	8	3	1	—		—		—		66	9
Castellón (loan)	2022–23	Primera Federación	36	4	—		—		—		4 (Note: Appearances in Primera Federación promotion play-offs)	0	40	4
Sporting CP	2025–26	Primeira Liga	18	0	3	0	2	0	2 (Note: Appearances in UEFA Champions League)	0	1 (Note: Appearance in Supertaça Cândido de Oliveira)	0	26	0
Sevilla	2026–27	La Liga	8	0	1	0	—		—		—		9	0
Career total			199	15	7	1	2	0	2	0	5	0	215	16

=== International ===
As of match played 17 November 2026

Appearances and goals by national team and year
National team	Year	Apps	Goals
Georgia	2023	5	0
Georgia	2024	12	2
Georgia	2025	7	2
Georgia	2026	7	0
Total		31	4

Scores and results list Georgia's goal tally first.

List of international goals scored by Giorgi Kochorashvili
No.	Date	Venue	Opponent	Score	Result	Competition
1.	7 September 2024	Mikheil Meskhi Stadium, Tbilisi, Georgia	Czech Republic	4–0	4–1	2024–25 UEFA Nations League B
2.	10 September 2024	Arena Kombëtare, Tirana, Albania	Albania	1–0	1–0	2024–25 UEFA Nations League B
3.	20 March 2025	Vazgen Sargsyan Republican Stadium, Yerevan, Armenia	Armenia	1–0	3–0	2024–25 UEFA Nations League promotion/relegation play-offs
4.	14 October 2025	Kocaeli Stadium, Kocaeli, Turkey	Turkey	1–4	1–4	2026 FIFA World Cup qualification

== Honours ==
Levante

- Segunda División: 2024–25
