= Diego Pampín =

Spanish footballer

Personal information
- Full name: Diego Varela Pampín
- Date of birth: 15 March 2000 (age 26)
- Place of birth: Oleiros, Spain
- Height: 1.75 m (5 ft 9 in)
- Position: Left-back

Team information
- Current team: Granada
- Number: 16

Youth career
- Ural
- Victoria
- 2014–2017: Celta

Senior career*
Years	Team	Apps	(Gls)
2017–2022	Celta B	128	(3)
2022–2024	Andorra	65	(1)
2024–2026	Levante	43	(1)
2026–	Granada	0	(0)

International career
2016–2017	Spain U17	6	(1)
2018–2019	Spain U19	2	(0)
- * Club domestic league appearances and goals as of 27 May 2026

Diego Varela Pampín (born 15 March 2000) is a Spanish professional footballer who plays as a left-back for Granada CF.

== Club career ==
Born in Oleiros, A Coruña, Galicia, Pampín joined RC Celta de Vigo's youth sides in 2014, after representing Victoria CF and Ural CF. He made his senior debut with the reserves at the age of just 17 on 20 August 2017, starting in a 2–1 Segunda División B home win over Pontevedra CF.

Pampín scored his first senior goal on 27 October 2018, netting the opener for the B's in a 1–1 away draw against Unionistas de Salamanca CF. A regular starter for the B-team in the following seasons, he left on 1 July after his contract expired.

On 8 July 2022, free agent Pampín signed a two-year deal with Segunda División newcomers FC Andorra. He made his professional debut on 29 August, coming on as a second-half substitute for Martí Vilà in a 2–0 away loss against UD Las Palmas.

Pampín scored his first professional goal on 10 September 2023, netting his team's third in a 4–3 away loss to CD Mirandés. The following 22 July, after the Tricolors' relegation, he moved to fellow second division side Levante UD on a one-year contract.

On 25 July 2026, Pampín agreed to a deal with Granada CF in division two.

== Honours ==
Levante

- Segunda División: 2024–25
