= Hugo Redón =

Spanish footballer

Personal information
- Full name: Hugo Redón Almela
- Date of birth: 19 April 2003 (age 23)
- Place of birth: Castellón de la Plana, Spain
- Height: 1.80 m (5 ft 11 in)
- Position: Midfielder

Team information
- Current team: Teruel
- Number: 6

Youth career
- Castellón
- 2018–2020: Levante
- 2020–2021: Patacona
- 2021–2022: Levante

Senior career*
Years	Team	Apps	(Gls)
2021	Patacona	5	(0)
2022–2025	Levante B	86	(3)
2022–2026	Levante	1	(0)
2025–2026	→ Teruel (loan)	34	(1)
2026–	Teruel	0	(0)
- * Club domestic league appearances and goals as of 10 June 2026

Hugo Redón Almela (born 19 April 2003) is a Spanish footballer who plays as a midfielder for CD Teruel.

== Club career ==
Born in Castellón de la Plana, Valencian Community, Redón joined Levante UD's youth setup in 2018, from hometown side CD Castellón. After appearing with affiliate club Patacona CF, he made his debut with the reserves on 16 April 2022, coming on as a second-half substitute in a 1–0 Segunda División RFEF home win over CD Marchamalo.

On 23 August 2022, Redón renewed his contract until 2026. He made his first team debut on 10 September, replacing Joni Montiel late into a 4–1 Segunda División home routing of Villarreal CF B.

Redón scored his first senior goal on 7 September 2024, netting the B's last-minute winner in a 2–1 away win over CF La Nucía. The following 16 July, he was loaned to Primera Federación side CD Teruel, for one year.

On 5 July 2026, Redón agreed to a permanent one-year deal with Teruel.
