= Andrés Fernández (footballer, born December 1986) =

Spanish footballer

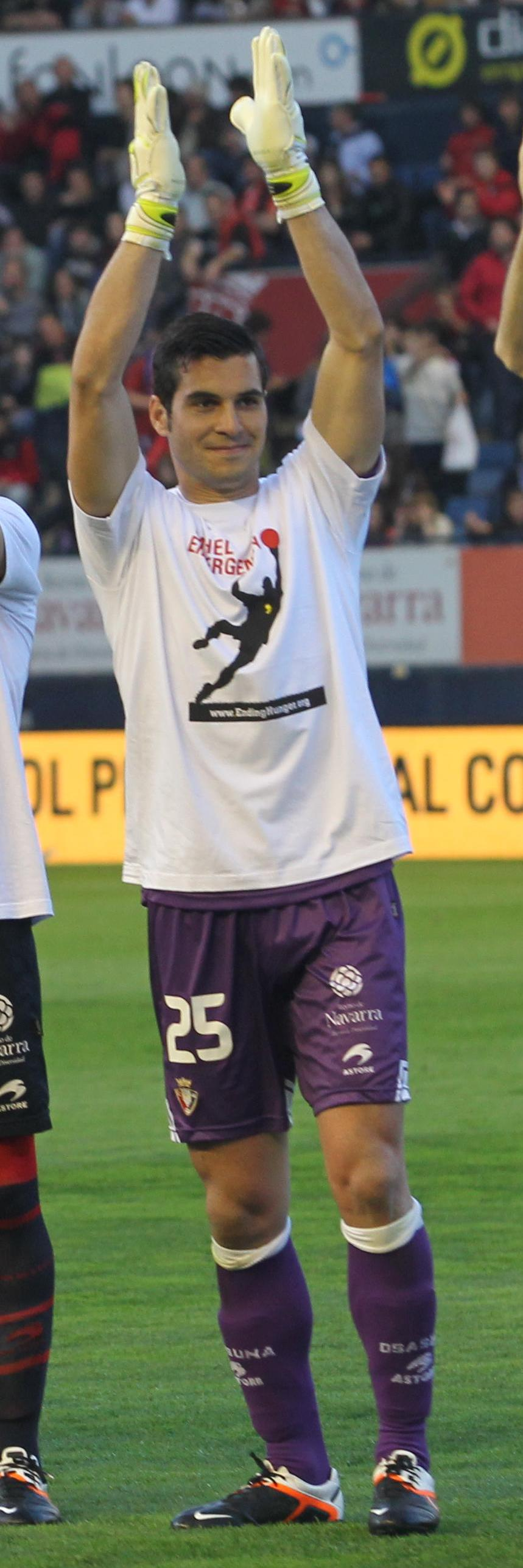
- Fernández before a game with Osasuna in 2012

Personal information
- Full name: Andrés Eduardo Fernández Moreno
- Date of birth: 17 December 1986 (age 39)
- Place of birth: Murcia, Spain
- Height: 1.87 m (6 ft 2 in)
- Position: Goalkeeper

Team information
- Current team: Almería
- Number: 1

Youth career
- 2001–2005: Tenerife

Senior career*
Years	Team	Apps	(Gls)
2005–2007	Mallorca B	25	(0)
2007–2010	Osasuna B	79	(0)
2007–2014	Osasuna	113	(0)
2010–2011	→ Huesca (loan)	31	(0)
2014–2017	Porto	1	(0)
2015–2016	→ Granada (loan)	37	(0)
2016–2017	→ Villarreal (loan)	15	(0)
2017–2020	Villarreal	13	(0)
2020–2023	Huesca	100	(0)
2023–2025	Levante	74	(0)
2025–	Almería	56	(0)
- * Club domestic league appearances and goals as of 21:55, 15 November 2026 (UTC)

Andrés Eduardo Fernández Moreno (born 17 December 1986) is a Spanish professional footballer who plays as a goalkeeper for Segunda División club Almería.

He spent most of his career with Osasuna, making his first-team debut in 2007 and going on to appear in 115 official matches. He also played four seasons with Villarreal, having signed in 2016 on loan.

== Club career ==
=== Osasuna ===
Fernández was born in Murcia. After one year with Mallorca's reserves, he was promoted to Osasuna's first team for 2007–08 and played once during that season, in a 2–0 La Liga away loss against Almería on 21 October 2007 as starter Ricardo was suspended and Juan Elía was sent off in the 50th minute.

The following years, Fernández continued to be third choice as well as the starter at the B side in the Segunda División B. In mid-July 2010, after consecutively helping the Navarrese's reserves to retain their top-flight status but failing to move up the first team's pecking order, he joined Segunda División club Huesca on loan.

Fernández returned for 2011–12 as Asier Riesgo's backup – the 39-year-old Ricardo was still on the roster – replacing the latter due to injury during the first half of a 0–0 draw at Atlético Madrid and eventually finishing the campaign as first choice, appearing in all 38 league games and conceding 61 goals.

=== Porto ===
On 30 July 2014, Fernández signed a four-year contract with Porto, with the buyout clause being set at €30 million. He became the fifth Spaniard to join the Portuguese club after compatriot Julen Lopetegui took over two months earlier.

Fernández made only four appearances during his spell, each in a different competition. His Primeira Liga debut was on 21 September 2014, in a goalless home draw with Boavista in the Derby da Invicta.

Fernández was loaned to Granada on 17 July 2015, in a season-long move. On 25 July of the following year, after playing all the matches but one to help his team again retain their top-tier status, he moved to Villarreal of the same league also in a temporary deal.

=== Villarreal ===
On 22 June 2017, Fernández joined Villarreal on a permanent four-year deal. He had finished his first season as starter due to Sergio Asenjo's serious knee injury but, on 25 August, during a league game away to Real Sociedad, met the same fate.

Fernández played second-fiddle to Asenjo until his departure, save for a brief period at the end of 2018–19.

=== Huesca ===
On 28 August 2020, Fernández agreed to a three-year contract at Huesca, newly promoted to the top division. A backup to Álvaro Fernández, he contributed 16 appearances in his first season, suffering relegation.

=== Later career ===
On 18 August 2023, Fernández signed a one-year deal with second-tier Levante. In July 2025, after helping the side to achieve promotion as champions, he joined Almería on a two-year contract. Starting his debut campaign aged 38, he took part in all 42 matches for the third-placed side, adding four in the unsuccessful promotion playoffs.

== Career statistics ==
As of match played 20 June 2026

Club	Season	League			National Cup		League Cup		Continental		Other		Total	
Club	Season	Division	Apps	Goals	Apps	Goals	Apps	Goals	Apps	Goals	Apps	Goals	Apps	Goals
Osasuna B	2007–08	Segunda División B	33	0	—		—		—		2 (Note: Appearances in Segunda División B relegation play-offs)	0	35	0
Osasuna B	2008–09	Segunda División B	33	0	—		—		—		—		33	0
Osasuna B	2009–10	Segunda División B	13	0	—		—		—		—		13	0
Osasuna B	Total		79	0	—		—		—		2	0	81	0
Osasuna	2007–08	La Liga	1	0	0	0	—		—		—		1	0
Osasuna	2008–09	La Liga	0	0	0	0	—		—		—		0	0
Osasuna	2009–10	La Liga	0	0	0	0	—		—		—		0	0
Osasuna	2011–12	La Liga	38	0	0	0	—		—		—		38	0
Osasuna	2012–13	La Liga	37	0	1	0	—		—		—		38	0
Osasuna	2013–14	La Liga	37	0	1	0	—		—		—		38	0
Osasuna	Total		113	0	2	0	—		—		—		115	0
Huesca (loan)	2010–11	Segunda División	31	0	2	0	—		—		—		33	0
Porto	2014–15	Primeira Liga	1	0	1	0	1	0	1 (Note: Appearance in UEFA Champions League)	0	—		4	0
Granada (loan)	2015–16	La Liga	37	0	0	0	—		–		—		37	0
Villarreal (loan)	2016–17	La Liga	15	0	0	0	—		5 (Note: Appearances in UEFA Europa League)	0	—		20	0
Villarreal	2017–18	La Liga	3	0	0	0	—		0	0	—		3	0
Villarreal	2018–19	La Liga	6	0	4	0	—		12	0	—		22	0
Villarreal	2019–20	La Liga	4	0	5	0	—		—		—		9	0
Villarreal	Total		28	0	9	0	—		17	0	—		54	0
Huesca	2020–21	La Liga	16	0	0	0	—		—		—		16	0
Huesca	2021–22	Segunda División	42	0	2	0	—		—		—		44	0
Huesca	2022–23	Segunda División	41	0	1	0	—		—		—		42	0
Huesca	Total		100	0	3	0	—		—		—		103	0
Levante	2023–24	Segunda División	33	0	1	0	—		—		—		34	0
Levante	2024–25	Segunda División	41	0	1	0	—		—		—		42	0
Levante	Total		74	0	2	0	—		—		—		76	0
Almería	2025–26	Segunda División	42	0	0	0	—		—		4 (Note: Appearances in La Liga play-offs)	0	46	0
Career total			505	0	19	0	1	0	18	0	6	0	549	0

== Honours ==
Levante

- Segunda División: 2024–25
