= Paco Cortés =

Spanish footballer

Personal information
- Full name: Francisco Cortés García
- Date of birth: 11 August 2007 (age 19)
- Place of birth: Granada, Spain
- Height: 1.78 m (5 ft 10 in)
- Position: Winger

Team information
- Current team: Levante

Youth career
- We FC
- Maracena
- 2020–2021: Levante
- 2021–2022: Patacona
- 2022–2024: Levante

Senior career*
Years	Team	Apps	(Gls)
2024–2025	Levante B	38	(6)
2024–	Levante	13	(0)
2025–2026	→ Cultural Leonesa (loan)	7	(2)

International career^{‡}
2024	Spain U17	3	(0)
2025-	Spain U19	5	(1)
- * Club domestic league appearances and goals as of 27 May 2026 ‡ National team caps and goals as of 6 May 2026

Francisco "Paco" Cortés García (born 11 August 2007) is a Spanish footballer who plays mainly as a left winger for Levante UD.

== Club career ==
Cortés was born in Granada, Andalusia, and joined Levante UD's youth setup in 2020, from UD Maracena. On 22 February 2024, while still a youth, he renewed his contract with the club until 2027.

Cortés made his senior debut with the reserves on 24 March 2024, coming on as a second-half substitute in a 1–0 Tercera Federación away loss against Ontinyent 1931 CF. He made his first team debut on 2 June, replacing Carlos Álvarez at half-time in a 0–0 Segunda División away draw against SD Huesca.

On 2 August 2025, Cortés renewed his contract with the Granotes until 2028, and was loaned to second division side Cultural y Deportiva Leonesa on 1 September. He scored his first professional goals on 18 October, netting a brace in a 5–0 away routing of Real Zaragoza.

On 8 January 2026, Cortés was recalled by Levante.

== International career ==
On 30 January 2024, Cortés was called up to the Spain national under-17 team along with Levante teammate Buba Sangaré.
