= Dani Martín (footballer, born 2005) =

Spanish footballer

Personal information
- Full name: Daniel Martín Rodríguez
- Date of birth: 26 September 2005 (age 21)
- Place of birth: Madrid, Spain
- Height: 1.88 m (6 ft 2 in)
- Position: Goalkeeper

Team information
- Current team: Valladolid (on loan from Levante)

Youth career
- Rayo Majadahonda

Senior career*
Years	Team	Apps	(Gls)
2023	Paracuellos Antamira	14	(0)
2023–2024	Rayo Majadahonda	31	(0)
2024–	Levante	0	(0)
2024–2025	→ Marbella (loan)	19	(0)
2025–2026	→ Huesca (loan)	4	(0)
2026–	→ Valladolid (loan)	0	(0)

International career
2023–2024	Spain U19	4	(0)
- * Club domestic league appearances and goals as of 9 June 2026

Daniel "Dani" Martín Rodríguez (born 26 September 2005) is a Spanish professional footballer who plays as a goalkeeper for Real Valladolid, on loan from Levante UD.

== Club career ==
Born in Madrid, Martín was a CF Rayo Majadahonda youth graduate. After making his senior debut with farm team CD Paracuellos Antamira in the 2022–23 Tercera Federación, he made his first team debut on 26 August 2023, starting in a 0–0 Primera Federación away draw against Deportivo de La Coruña.

On 31 August 2023, Martín renewed his contract with the Majariegos until 2026, and was set a release clause of € 1 million. He became a regular starter for the side during the campaign, featuring in 31 matches but being unable to avoid relegation.

On 12 August 2024, Martín signed a four-year deal with Segunda División side Levante UD. Eight days later, however, he was loaned to third division side Marbella FC, for one year.

On 16 July 2025, Martín moved to second division side SD Huesca on loan for the campaign. He made his professional debut on 17 December, starting in a 4–2 Copa del Rey home loss to CA Osasuna, and only appeared in the league the following May.

On 1 September 2026, Martín agreed to a one-year loan deal with Real Valladolid, also in divisio two.

== International career ==
On 30 August 2023, Martín was called up to the Spain national under-19 team for a period of trainings. He made his international debut on 15 November, starting in a 5–0 routing of Moldova.
