= Álex Forés =

Spanish footballer

Personal information
- Full name: Álex Forés Mendoza
- Date of birth: 12 April 2001 (age 25)
- Place of birth: Valencia, Spain
- Height: 1.79 m (5 ft 10 in)
- Position: Forward

Team information
- Current team: Burgos

Youth career
- 2006–2007: Vall dels Alcalans
- 2010–2012: Colegio Salgui
- 2012–2016: Levante
- 2016–2018: Real Madrid
- 2018–2019: Roda
- 2019–2020: Villarreal

Senior career*
| Years | Team | Apps | (Gls) |
| 2019–2021 | Villarreal C | 25 | (13) |
| 2020–2024 | Villarreal B | 109 | (24) |
| 2024–2026 | Villarreal | 0 | (0) |
| 2025 | → Levante (loan) | 18 | (5) |
| 2025–2026 | → Oviedo (loan) | 18 | (0) |
| 2026– | Burgos | 0 | (0) |
- * Club domestic league appearances and goals as of 26 May 2026

Álex Forés Mendoza (born 12 April 2001) is a Spanish footballer who plays as a forward for Burgos CF.

== Club career ==
Born in Valencia, Forés played for UE Vall dels Alcalans, Club Colegio Salgui EDE and Levante UD before joining Real Madrid's La Fábrica in July 2016. He left the latter side in 2018, and finished his formation with Villarreal CF.

Forés made his senior debut with the C-team on 1 September 2019, coming on as a second-half substitute for Juan Carlos Arana in a 1–0 Tercera División home win over CD Olímpic de Xàtiva, and scored his first goal on 11 November of the following year by netting the equalizer in a 2–2 home draw against CD Roda. He also appeared with the reserves in Segunda División B during the 2020–21 season, while scoring 13 times for the C's.

Definitely promoted to the B-side in August 2021, Forés was mainly used as a backup option to Arana, but still scored six times during the campaign as his side achieved promotion to Segunda División. He made his professional debut on 12 October, replacing Diego Collado in a 2–2 home draw against SD Ponferradina.

Forés scored his first professional goal on 11 February 2023, but in a 2–1 away loss against CD Mirandés. On 7 July, he renewed his contract with the Yellow Submarine until 2026.

In May 2024, Forés broke his tibia, only returning to action after nearly eight months. On 20 January 2025, he was loaned to Levante UD in the second division for the remainder of the season.

On 24 July 2025, after helping Levante to achieve promotion to La Liga as champions, Forés moved to Real Oviedo, also newly promoted, on a one-year loan deal. On 7 August 2026, he signed a four-year contract with Burgos CF in division two.

== Honours ==
Levante

- Segunda División: 2024–25
