= Edgar Alcañiz =

Spanish footballer (born 2005)

Personal information
- Full name: Edgar Alcañiz Baldovi
- Date of birth: 18 March 2005 (age 21)
- Place of birth: Sueca, Spain
- Height: 1.73 m (5 ft 8 in)
- Position: Midfielder

Team information
- Current team: Atlético Madrid B

Youth career
- 2011–2013: Promeses Sueca
- 2013–2014: Alzira
- 2014–2019: Levante
- 2019–2020: Patacona
- 2020–2023: Levante

Senior career*
Years	Team	Apps	(Gls)
2023–2025	Levante B	61	(2)
2023–2026	Levante	3	(0)
2025–2026	→ Cartagena (loan)	29	(0)
2026–	Atlético Madrid B	0	(0)

International career
2023	Spain U18	2	(0)
- * Club domestic league appearances and goals as of 10 June 2026

Edgar Alcañiz Baldovi (born 18 March 2005) is a Spanish footballer who plays as a midfielder for Atlético Madrileño.

== Club career ==
Born in Sueca, Valencian Community, Alcañiz joined Levante UD's youth setup in 2014, from UD Alzira. He made his senior debut with the reserves on 12 March 2023, coming on as a second-half substitute in a 2–1 Tercera Federación away loss against Elche CF Ilicitano.

Alcañiz made his first team debut on 27 May 2023, replacing fellow youth graduate Pepelu late into a 2–1 Segunda División home win over Real Oviedo. On 4 July, he renewed his contract until 2025.

On 21 July 2025, Alcañiz was loaned to Primera Federación side FC Cartagena for the season. On 4 August of the following year, he agreed to a three-year deal with another reserve team, Atlético Madrileño also in division three.

== International career ==
On 11 April 2023, Alcañiz was called up to the Spain national under-18 team by manager Santi Denia, making his international debut in a friendly against Switzerland seven days later.
