= Jorge Cabello =

Spanish footballer

Personal information
- Full name: Jorge Cabello Trujillo
- Date of birth: 25 April 2004 (age 22)
- Place of birth: Telde, Spain
- Height: 1.80 m (5 ft 11 in)
- Position: Centre-back

Team information
- Current team: Levante

Youth career
- Telde
- Las Palmas
- 2019–2020: Levante
- 2020–2021: Patacona
- 2021–2023: Levante

Senior career*
Years	Team	Apps	(Gls)
2023–2024	Levante B	29	(0)
2024–	Levante	31	(0)
2026	→ Mirandés (loan)	22	(0)
- * Club domestic league appearances and goals as of 9 June 2026

Jorge Cabello Trujillo (born 25 April 2004) is a Spanish footballer who plays as a centre-back for Levante UD.

== Career ==
Born in Telde, Las Palmas, Canary Islands, Cabello joined Levante UD's youth sides in May 2019, from UD Las Palmas. He made his senior debut with the reserves on 19 February 2023, starting in a 0–0 Tercera Federación home draw against Atzeneta UE.

Cabello made his first team debut on 20 April 2024, starting in a 0–0 Segunda División away draw against Racing de Santander. On 6 July, he renewed his contract until 2028 and was promoted to the main squad.

A backup option, Cabello contributed with 21 appearances overall during the 2024–25 season as the Granotes achieved promotion to La Liga as champions. He made his debut in the category on 16 August 2025, starting in a 2–1 away loss to Deportivo Alavés.

On 8 January 2026, after being rarely used, Cabello was loaned to CD Mirandés in the second division until June.

== Honours ==
Levante

- Segunda División: 2024–25
