= Pablo Campos (Spanish footballer) =

Spanish footballer

Personal information
- Full name: Pablo Cuñat Campos
- Date of birth: 28 April 2002 (age 24)
- Place of birth: Valencia, Spain
- Height: 1.88 m (6 ft 2 in)
- Position: Goalkeeper

Team information
- Current team: Levante
- Number: 1

Youth career
- 2013–2017: Levante
- 2017–2020: Barcelona
- 2020–2021: Levante

Senior career*
Years	Team	Apps	(Gls)
2020–2023	Levante B	51	(0)
2023–	Levante	2	(0)
2023–2024	→ Amorebieta (loan)	26	(0)
2024–2025	→ Cartagena (loan)	35	(0)

International career^{‡}
2023–2025	Spain U21	8	(0)
- * Club domestic league appearances and goals as of 23 August 2025 ‡ National team caps and goals as of 00:12, 17 August 2025 (UTC)

Pablo Cuñat Campos (born 28 April 2002) is a Spanish professional footballer who plays as a goalkeeper for Levante UD.

== Club career ==
Born in Valencia, Campos joined FC Barcelona's La Masia on 13 June 2017, from hometown side Levante UD. He returned to Levante in 2020, and made his senior debut with the reserves on 13 December of that year, starting in a 1–0 Segunda División B home loss against Hércules CF.

On 3 December 2021, after establishing himself as a starter with the B's under manager Alessio Lisci, Campos renewed his contract with the club until 2024. On 7 August 2023, he was loaned to Segunda División side SD Amorebieta for the season.

Campos made his professional debut on 11 August 2023, starting in a 1–1 home draw against his parent club Levante. The following 3 June, after Amore's relegation, he returned to his parent club and had his link renewed until 2026 after the Granotes activated an extension clause.

On 9 July 2024, Campos moved to fellow second division side FC Cartagena also on a one-year loan deal. A first-choice during most of the campaign, he featured in 38 matches overall but was unable to prevent team relegation.

After the departure of Andrés Fernández, Campos became the first-choice of Levante and made his club debut on 16 August 2025, in a 2–1 away loss to Deportivo Alavés; it was also his first match in La Liga. Six days later, he renewed his contract until 2027.

== International career ==
Campos made his debut for the Spain national under-21 team in September 2023, in a 6–0 win over Malta. He continued to feature with the side in the following years, and was included in the 23-man squad for the 2025 UEFA European Under-21 Championship, where he was a backup to Alejandro Iturbe.

== Career statistics ==
As of match played 17 December 2025

Appearances and goals by club, season and competition
Club	Season	League			National cup		Europe		Other		Total	
Club	Season	Division	Apps	Goals	Apps	Goals	Apps	Goals	Apps	Goals	Apps	Goals
Levante B	2020–21	Segunda División B	9	0	—		—		—		9	0
Levante B	2021–22	Segunda División RFEF	20	0	—		—		—		20	0
Levante B	2022–23	Tercera Federación	22	0	—		—		—		22	0
Levante B	Total		51	0	—		—		—		51	0
Levante	2020–21	La Liga	0	0	0	0	—		—		0	0
Levante	2021–22	La Liga	0	0	0	0	—		—		0	0
Levante	2022–23	Segunda División	0	0	0	0	—		0	0	0	0
Levante	2025–26	La Liga	2	0	3	0	—		—		5	0
Levante	2026–27	La Liga	0	0	0	0	—		—		0	0
Levante	Total		2	0	3	0	—		—		5	0
Amorebieta (loan)	2023–24	Segunda División	26	0	0	0	—		—		26	0
Cartagena (loan)	2024–25	Segunda División	35	0	3	0	—		—		38	0
Career total			114	0	6	0	0	0	0	0	120	0
