= Ángel Algobia =

Spanish footballer

Personal information
- Full name: Ángel Algobia Esteves
- Date of birth: 23 June 1999 (age 27)
- Place of birth: Velilla de San Antonio, Spain
- Height: 1.80 m (5 ft 11 in)
- Position: Midfielder

Team information
- Current team: Cultural Leonesa
- Number: 23

Youth career
- 2008–2014: Rayo Vallecano
- 2014–2015: Alcobendas
- 2015–2018: Rayo Vallecano

Senior career*
Years	Team	Apps	(Gls)
2018–2020	Rayo Vallecano B	63	(2)
2020–2022	Getafe B	58	(3)
2021–2023	Getafe	26	(0)
2023–2025	Levante	44	(3)
2025–2026	AVS	22	(1)
2026–	Cultural Leonesa	2	(0)
- * Club domestic league appearances and goals as of 13 September 2026

Ángel Algobia Esteves (born 23 June 1999) is a Spanish professional footballer who plays as a midfielder for Primera Federación club Cultural Leonesa.

== Club career ==
Born in Velilla de San Antonio, Community of Madrid, Algobia joined Rayo Vallecano's youth setup in 2008, aged nine. He left in 2014 and joined Alcobendas CF, but returned to Rayo in the following year.

Algobia made his senior debut with Rayo's reserves on 26 August 2018, starting in a 2–1 Tercera División home win over CD San Fernando de Henares. He scored his first goal as a senior on 21 October, netting the opener in a 3–3 away draw against CF San Agustín del Guadalix, and finished the campaign as an undisputed starter.

Algobia left Rayo on 13 August 2020, and moved to Getafe CF five days later, being assigned to the B-team in Segunda División B. He made his first team debut with the latter on 30 November 2021, starting in a 5–1 away routing of CFJ Mollerussa, for the season's Copa del Rey.

On 11 August 2022, after impressing manager Quique Sánchez Flores during the pre-season, Algobia signed a professional contract and was definitely promoted to the main squad in La Liga. He made his first team debut on 11 September, starting in a 2–1 home win over Real Sociedad.

On 10 August 2023, Algobia signed a two-year contract with Segunda División side Levante UD.

== Honours ==
Levante

- Segunda División: 2024–25
