= Marcos Navarro =

Spanish footballer

Personal information
- Full name: Marcos Navarro Blázquez
- Date of birth: 30 May 2004 (age 22)
- Place of birth: Riba-roja de Túria, Spain
- Height: 1.72 m (5 ft 8 in)
- Position: Left back

Team information
- Current team: Valencia B
- Number: 3

Youth career
- Ribarroja
- Alboraya
- Valencia
- 2022–2023: Levante

Senior career*
Years	Team	Apps	(Gls)
2023–2024	Levante B	14	(0)
2023–2025	Levante	13	(0)
2025–	Valencia B	32	(0)
- * Club domestic league appearances and goals as of 15 May 2026

Marcos Navarro Blázquez (born 30 May 2004) is a Spanish footballer who plays as a left back for Valencia CF Mestalla.

== Career ==
Born in Riba-roja de Túria, Valencian Community, Navarro joined Valencia CF's youth setup from Alboraya UD. On 15 June 2022, aged 18, he moved to Levante UD and was assigned to the Juvenil squad.

Navarro was promoted to the reserves in Tercera Federación on 20 July 2023, but spent the entire pre-season with the main squad. He made his professional debut on 25 August, coming on as a late substitute for Álex Valle in a 1–0 Segunda División away win over FC Cartagena.

On 29 July 2025, Navarro returned to Valencia and was assigned to the reserves in Segunda Federación.

== Honours ==
Levante

- Segunda División: 2024–25
