= Xavi Grande =

Spanish footballer

Personal information
- Full name: Xavier Grande Sánchez
- Date of birth: 28 January 2005 (age 21)
- Place of birth: Almàssera, Spain
- Height: 1.75 m (5 ft 9 in)
- Position: Right-back

Team information
- Current team: Académica de Coimbra
- Number: 2

Youth career
- 2013–2019: Levante
- 2019–2020: Patacona
- 2020–2023: Levante

Senior career*
Years	Team	Apps	(Gls)
2021–2024	Levante B	21	(1)
2023–2026	Levante	24	(0)
2025–2026	→ Marítimo (loan)	25	(0)
2026–	Académica de Coimbra	1	(0)

International career^{‡}
2023	Spain U18	3	(0)
2024	Spain U19	1	(0)
- * Club domestic league appearances and goals as of 11 September 2026 ‡ National team caps and goals as of 17:01, 12 February 2024 (UTC)

Xavier "Xavi" Grande Sánchez (born 28 January 2005) is a Spanish professional footballer who plays as a right-back for Liga Portugal 2 club Académica de Coimbra.

== Club career ==
Born in Almàssera, Valencian Community, Grande joined Levante UD's youth setup in 2013, aged eight. He made his senior debut with the reserves on 17 October 2021, coming on as a late substitute for Carlos Giménez in a 3–0 Segunda División RFEF away win over Hércules CF.

Grande scored his first senior goal on 9 September 2023, netting the B's second in a 3–0 win at Patacona CF. He made his professional debut on 3 October, starting in a 1–1 Segunda División home draw against Villarreal CF B.

On 11 July 2025, Grande moved abroad and joined Liga Portugal 2 side CS Marítimo on a one-year loan deal. Upon returning, he terminated his link with the Granotes on 4 September 2026.

== International career ==
In January 2023, Grande was called up to the Spain national under-18 team.

== Honours ==
Levante

- Segunda División: 2024–25
