= Roger Brugué =

Spanish footballer

Personal information
- Full name: Roger Brugué Ayguade
- Date of birth: 4 November 1996 (age 30)
- Place of birth: Bàscara, Spain
- Height: 1.73 m (5 ft 8 in)
- Position: Winger

Team information
- Current team: Levante
- Number: 7

Youth career
- 2002–2006: Bàscara
- 2006–2009: Peralada
- 2009–2015: Figueres

Senior career*
Years	Team	Apps	(Gls)
2014–2016	Figueres	28	(4)
2016–2018	Pobla Mafumet	66	(10)
2017–2021	Gimnàstic	59	(7)
2021–	Levante	112	(20)
2021–2022	→ Mirandés (loan)	40	(8)
- * Club domestic league appearances and goals as of 27 May 2026

Roger Brugué Ayguade (born 4 November 1996), commonly known as Brugui, is a Spanish professional footballer who plays for Levante UD. Mainly a winger, he can also play as a wing-back.

== Career ==
Born in Bàscara, Girona, Catalonia, Brugui was a UE Figueres youth graduate. On 14 December 2014, aged 18, he made his first team debut by coming on as a second-half substitute in a 2–0 Tercera División home loss against Palamós CF. He scored his first goal the following 26 April, netting his team's second in a 4–2 home loss against FC Vilafranca.

On 19 May 2016, Brugui renewed his contract with the club. On 13 July, however, he joined Gimnàstic de Tarragona, being initially assigned to the farm team also in the fourth division.

Brugui made his first team debut on 28 October 2017, coming on as a late substitute for Maikel Mesa in a 1–0 away loss against CD Lugo in the Segunda División. The following 12 January, he renewed his contract until 2020.

On 1 July 2021, free agent Brugui moved straight to La Liga, after agreeing to a four-year deal with Levante UD, but was loaned to CD Mirandés in the second division on 12 August.

Back to Levante in July 2022, Brugui only established himself as a first-choice during the 2024–25 season, scoring a career-best 11 goals as the club achieved promotion to the top tier. On 2 June 2025, he renewed his contract until 2028.

== Honours ==
Levante

- Segunda División: 2024–25
