= List of Segunda División football transfers summer 2025 =

This is a list of Spanish football transfers for the 2025 summer transfer window. Only transfers featuring Segunda División are listed, for other transfers, see List of Spanish football transfers summer 2025.

== Segunda División ==
Note: Flags indicate national team as has been defined under FIFA eligibility rules. Players may hold more than one non-FIFA nationality.

=== Albacete ===
In:

No.	Pos.	Nation	Player
1	GK	ESP	Diego Mariño (from Granada)
2	DF	ESP	Lorenzo Aguado (from Real Madrid)
3	DF	USA	Jonathan Gómez (on loan from (Greece) PAOK)
7	FW	ESP	Antonio Puertas (from Eibar)
10	FW	ESP	Jefté Betancor (on loan from (Greece) Olympiacos, previously on loan at (Greece) Panserraikos)
11	MF	ESP	Víctor Valverde (from Villarreal B)
15	DF	ESP	Fran Gámez (from Eldense)
21	DF	ESP	Carlos Neva (from Granada)
24	DF	ESP	Jesús Vallejo (from Real Madrid)

Out:

No.	Pos.	Nation	Player
1	GK	ESP	Cristian Rivero (loan return to Valencia)
3	DF	ESP	Juan María Alcedo (to Córdoba)
6	MF	ESP	Rai Marchán (released)
7	FW	ESP	Juanma (released)
10	MF	ESP	Fidel Chaves (released)
19	FW	ESP	Javier Martón (loan return to Athletic Bilbao, later sold to Eibar)
21	MF	ESP	Pablo Sáenz (loan return to Granada)
23	DF	ESP	Álvaro Rodríguez (to Eibar)
24	DF	ESP	Jaume Costa (released)
25	FW	CMR	Christian Kofane (to (Germany) Bayer Leverkusen)
27	DF	ESP	Lalo Aguilar (loan return to Leganés)
29	DF	ESP	Javi Rueda (loan return to Celta Vigo)
34	FW	ESP	Marcos Moreno (on loan to Talavera)
—	FW	VEN	Jovanny Bolívar (on loan to (Colombia) La Equidad, previously on loan at (Ukraine) Kolos Kovalivka)

=== Almería ===
In:

No.	Pos.	Nation	Player
1	GK	ESP	Andrés Fernández (from Levante)
3	DF	ESP	Álex Muñoz (from Las Palmas)
4	DF	POR	Nélson Monte (from Málaga)
6	MF	POR	André Horta (on loan from (Portugal) Braga, previously on loan at (Greece) Olympiacos)
9	FW	BRA	Thalys (from (Brazil) Palmeiras)
15	DF	ESP	Aridane Hernández (from Rayo Vallecano)
16	DF	ESP	Marcos Luna (from Zaragoza)
18	DF	ITA	Federico Bonini (from (Italy) Catanzaro)
19	MF	CMR	Patrick Soko (from Huesca)
22	DF	CUW	Daijiro Chirino (from Castellón)
29	MF	SRB	Stefan Džodić (from (France) Montpellier)

Out:

No.	Pos.	Nation	Player
3	DF	ESP	Edgar González (on loan to (Croatia) Hajduk Split)
4	DF	BRA	Kaiky (to (United Arab Emirates) Shabab Al Ahli)
7	FW	BRA	Lázaro (to (Saudi Arabia) Al-Najma)
9	FW	COL	Luis Suárez (to (Portugal) Sporting CP)
11	MF	ESP	Gonzalo Melero (to Leganés)
16	DF	SRB	Aleksandar Radovanović (to Zaragoza)
17	DF	ESP	Alejandro Pozo (on loan to (Poland) Jagiellonia Białystok)
18	DF	ESP	Marc Pubill (to Atlético Madrid)
19	FW	SRB	Marko Milovanović (on loan to (Portugal) Alverca)
24	DF	MOZ	Bruno Langa (on loan to (Greece) Pafos)
28	FW	MAR	Rachad Fettal (to Real Madrid B)
—	DF	ESP	Arnau Solà (to (Portugal) Arouca, previously on loan at Villarreal)
—	MF	ENG	Arvin Appiah (on loan to (France) Amiens, previously on loan at (Portugal) Nacional)
—	MF	ESP	Marcos Peña (to (Portugal) Famalicão, previously on loan at Marbella)
—	MF	ESP	Rubén Quintanilla (on loan to Eldense, previously on loan at Burgos)
—	FW	URU	Juan Manuel Gutiérrez (on loan to (Argentina) Defensa y Justicia, previously on loan at (Uruguay) Boston River)

=== Andorra ===
In:

No.	Pos.	Nation	Player
2	DF	ESP	Álex Petxarroman (on loan from Deportivo La Coruña)
4	DF	ESP	Gael Alonso (from Celta Vigo B)
8	MF	TUR	Efe Akman (from (Turkey) Galatasaray)
13	GK	GEQ	Jesús Owono (on loan from Alavés)
15	FW	ESP	Aingeru Olabarrieta (on loan from Athletic Bilbao)
16	FW	POR	Jastin García (on loan from Girona)
17	DF	FRA	Thomas Carrique (from Ponferradina)
18	MF	ESP	Marc Domènech (from Ibiza)
19	DF	ESP	Imanol (on loan from (Czech Republic) Sparta Prague)
22	FW	ESP	Aitor Uzkudun (from Arenas Club)
25	GK	HUN	Áron Yaakobishvili (on loan from Barcelona)
29	FW	KOR	Kim Min-su (on loan from Girona)
—	DF	ESP	Jan Encuentra (from Real Betis B)
—	DF	ESP	Alejandro Ibarrondo (from Arenas Club)

Out:

No.	Pos.	Nation	Player
7	FW	COL	Juanda Fuentes (on loan to Gimnàstic Tarragona)
8	MF	ESP	Erik Morán (released)
15	MF	ESP	Luismi Redondo (on loan to Cartagena)
16	MF	ESP	Álvaro Peña (released)
19	FW	GRE	Christos Albanis (on loan to Gimnàstic Tarragona)
24	DF	ESP	Pau Casadesús (to Granada)
27	DF	AND	Iván Rodríguez (on loan to Villarreal B)
—	DF	ESP	Jan Encuentra (on loan to Unionistas de Salamanca)
—	DF	ESP	Alejandro Ibarrondo (to Eldense)
—	DF	ESP	Javier Vicario (on loan to Barakaldo)
—	MF	ESP	Alberto Solís (on loan to Arenteiro)
—	FW	ESP	Bilal Achhiba (on loan to Atlètic Lleida)
—	FW	AND	Albert Rosas (on loan to Logroñés, previously on loan at Atlético Baleares)

=== Burgos ===
In:

No.	Pos.	Nation	Player
1	GK	ESP	Jesús Ruiz (from Racing Ferrol)
2	DF	ESP	Álex Lizancos (from Lugo)
7	MF	COL	Mateo Mejía (from Sevilla)
11	MF	ESP	Víctor Mollejo (from Atlético Madrid)
15	DF	ESP	Aitor Buñuel (from Racing Ferrol)
19	MF	ESP	Iván Chapela (from Eldense)
20	FW	ESP	Mario González (from (United States) Los Angeles FC, previously on loan at (Poland) Lech Poznań)
22	DF	ESP	Brais Martínez (from Racing Ferrol)
24	DF	ESP	Sergio González (from Tenerife)

Out:

No.	Pos.	Nation	Player
1	GK	ESP	Tomeu Nadal (retired)
2	DF	CIV	Ghislain Konan (to (Portugal) Gil Vicente)
6	DF	ESP	Raúl Navarro (released)
7	MF	ESP	Dani Ojeda (to Huesca)
10	MF	ESP	Borja Sánchez (loan return to Real Oviedo)
11	MF	ESP	Álex Sancris (to Getafe)
15	MF	SUI	Gabriel Barès (released)
17	FW	URU	Fernando Mimbacas (on loan to (Colombia) Deportivo Cali)
19	FW	ESP	Edu Espiau (to (Poland) Arka Gdynia)
20	DF	ESP	Pipa (loan return to (Bulgaria) Ludogorets Razgrad)
22	MF	ESP	Elady Zorrilla (released)
46	MF	ESP	Rubén Quintanilla (loan return to Almería, later loaned to Eldense)
—	MF	ESP	Ander Martín (released, previously on loan at Mirandés)

=== Cádiz ===
In:

No.	Pos.	Nation	Player
2	DF	ESP	Jorge Moreno (from Osasuna, previously on loan at Cartagena)
7	MF	NGR	Efe Aghama (from Ceuta)
11	MF	ESP	Suso (from Sevilla)
12	MF	GEO	Iuri Tabatadze (from (Georgia (country)) Iberia 1999)
14	DF	SRB	Bojan Kovačević (from (Serbia) Partizan, previously on loan)
15	MF	ESP	Sergio Ortuño (from Eldense)
17	FW	MTN	Dawda Camara (on loan from Girona)
18	MF	MLI	Youssouf Diarra (from Tenerife)
23	FW	ESP	Álvaro García Pascual (from Sevilla)
24	MF	ESP	Joaquín González (from Atlético Madrid B)
27	DF	ESP	Pelayo Fernández (on loan from Rayo Vallecano)
29	DF	ECU	Alfred Caicedo (on loan from (Belgium) Jong Genk)
—	MF	ESP	David García (from Atlético Sanluqueño)
—	MF	GHA	Isaac Obeng (from Teruel)

Out:

No.	Pos.	Nation	Player
4	MF	ESP	Rubén Alcaraz (to Granada)
5	DF	ESP	Víctor Chust (on loan to Elche)
6	MF	ESP	Fede San Emeterio (released)
7	FW	ESP	Rubén Sobrino (to Cultural Leonesa)
13	GK	ESP	José Antonio Caro (to Las Palmas)
16	FW	ESP	Chris Ramos (on loan to (Brazil) Botafogo)
17	MF	ARG	Gonzalo Escalante (released)
18	DF	ESP	José Joaquín Matos (to Ceuta)
23	FW	ESP	Carlos Fernández (loan return to Real Sociedad, later loaned to Mirandés)
25	MF	ESP	Óscar Melendo (to (China) Shanghai Port)
—	MF	ESP	Iván Alejo (to (Cyprus) APOEL, previously on loan and later sold to Valladolid)
—	MF	MLI	Youba Diarra (to (Austria) TSV Hartberg, previously on loan)
—	MF	GHA	Isaac Obeng (on loan to Algeciras)

=== Castellón ===
In:

No.	Pos.	Nation	Player
3	DF	ITA	Fabrizio Brignani (from (Italy) Mantova)
4	DF	ARG	Agustín Sienra (from (Argentina) Defensa y Justicia)
6	MF	FRA	Marc-Olivier Doué (from Ponferradina)
8	MF	ESP	Diego Barri (from Cultural Leonesa)
12	DF	ESP	Lucas Alcázar (from Real Betis B)
13	GK	BEL	Romain Matthys (from (Netherlands) MVV)
15	MF	ESP	Beñat Gerenabarrena (on loan from Athletic Bilbao)
18	MF	ESP	Pablo Santiago (from Barakaldo)
19	FW	DEN	Adam Jakobsen (from (Sweden) Brommapojkarna)
22	DF	FRA	Jérémy Mellot (from Tenerife)
24	FW	ESP	Serpeta (from Yeclano)
25	MF	BRA	Ronaldo Pompeu (from (Italy) Vicenza)
26	DF	ESP	Tincho Conde (from Celta B)
29	FW	ITA	Tommaso De Nipoti (on loan from (Italy) Atalanta)
55	DF	POL	Michał Willmann (from (Poland) Podbeskidzie Bielsko-Biała)

Out:

No.	Pos.	Nation	Player
1	GK	ARG	Gonzalo Crettaz (to (Netherlands) NEC)
2	MF	URU	Giovanni Zarfino (released)
3	MF	MLI	Mamadou Traoré (on loan to Teruel)
6	MF	NED	Thomas van den Belt (loan return to (Netherlands) Feyenoord, later sold to (Netherlands) Twente)
7	MF	ESP	Sergio Moyita (released)
9	FW	ESP	Jesús de Miguel (to Tenerife)
10	FW	ESP	Raúl Sánchez (to (Mexico) Necaxa)
12	MF	SRB	Miloš Jojić (released)
15	DF	NED	Jetro Willems (to (Netherlands) NEC)
18	MF	FRA	Albert Lottin (on loan to (Portugal) União de Leiria)
22	DF	CUW	Daijiro Chirino (to Almería)
23	MF	ESP	Josep Calavera (to Tenerife)
25	DF	PAR	Juan Escobar (released)
29	DF	GEQ	Santi Borikó (on loan to Arenas Club)
33	DF	NED	Jozhua Vertrouwd (to Rayo Vallecano)
51	MF	ESP	Gonzalo Pastor (to (Portugal) Famalicão)
—	DF	ESP	José Albert (on loan to Ibiza)
—	FW	SLO	David Flakus Bosilj (to Real Murcia, previously on loan)
—	FW	ESP	Pere Marco (on loan to Unionistas de Salamanca, previously on loan at Marbella)

=== Ceuta ===
In:

No.	Pos.	Nation	Player
2	DF	ESP	Manu Sánchez (from Levante)
3	DF	ESP	José Joaquín Matos (from Cádiz)
9	FW	ESP	Marcos Fernández (on loan from Espanyol)
11	FW	ESP	Juanto Ortuño (from Eldense)
12	FW	GHA	Samuel Obeng (from (Morocco) Wydad)
15	DF	ESP	Diego González (from Huesca)
18	MF	USA	Konrad de la Fuente (on loan from (Switzerland) Lausanne-Sport)
21	FW	ESP	Manu Vallejo (from Racing Ferrol)
23	MF	MAR	Anuar Tuhami (from Valladolid)
25	FW	ESP	Salvi Sánchez (Free Agent)
26	MF	CIV	Aboubacar Bassinga (on loan from Las Palmas)
27	MF	NGR	Efe Aghama (from Lleida)
—	FW	ESP	Iomar Vidal (from Elche B)

Out:

No.	Pos.	Nation	Player
9	FW	ESP	Rodri (released)
12	MF	ESP	Víctor Corral (on loan to Mérida)
15	DF	ESP	Jacobo Gúzman (released)
21	MF	ESP	Jota López (released)
27	MF	NGR	Efe Aghama (to Cádiz)
—	DF	ESP	Darío Lozano (on loan to Malacitano)
—	MF	NGR	Bless Aniekan (on loan to Xerez)
—	FW	FRA	Sofiane El Ftouhi (to Ibiza, previously on loan at Atlético Sanluqueño)
—	FW	ESP	Iomar Vidal (on loan to Antequera)

=== Córdoba ===
In:

No.	Pos.	Nation	Player
1	GK	AND	Iker Álvarez (from Villarreal B)
2	DF	ESP	Ignasi Vilarrasa (from Huesca)
3	DF	ESP	Juan María Alcedo (from Albacete)
4	DF	ESP	Álex Martín (from Elche)
5	MF	ESP	Diego Bri (on loan from Atlético Madrid B)
11	MF	ESP	Kevin Medina (from Málaga)
12	DF	CMR	Franck Fomeyem (from Antequera)
14	FW	ESP	Sergi Guardiola (from Rayo Vallecano)
18	FW	ESP	Adrián Fuentes (from Tarazona)
19	MF	BRA	Dalisson (from Pontevedra)
20	MF	ESP	Alberto del Moral (on loan from Real Oviedo, loan extended)
28	MF	ESP	Jan Salas (on loan from Mallorca)
30	MF	ESP	Dani Requena (on loan from Villarreal)
—	FW	ESP	Mariano Carmona (from Coria)

Out:

No.	Pos.	Nation	Player
3	DF	ESP	José Manuel Calderón (released)
5	DF	ESP	Marvel (loan return to Real Madrid B, later sold to Leganés)
6	MF	ESP	Álex Sala (to (Italy) Lecce)
11	MF	ESP	Ander Yoldi (loan return to Osasuna)
18	DF	ESP	Genaro Rodríguez (released)
19	FW	ENG	Jude Soonsup-Bell (to (England) Grimsby Town)
20	FW	ESP	Antonio Casas (to (Italy) Venezia)
24	MF	ESP	Jon Magunazelaia (loan return to Real Sociedad, later sold to Eibar)
25	DF	ITA	Gabriele Corbo (to (Italy) Pescara)
26	GK	ESP	Ramon Vila (on loan to Eldense)
27	DF	ESP	Matías Barboza (on loan to Atlético Madrid B)
28	MF	ESP	Ntji Tounkara (on loan to Atlético Sanluqueño)
—	FW	ESP	George Andrews (on loan to Europa)
—	FW	ESP	Mariano Carmona (on loan to Alcorcón)

=== Cultural Leonesa ===
In:

No.	Pos.	Nation	Player
2	MF	ESP	Jordi Mboula (from (Portugal) Gil Vicente)
7	MF	ESP	Diego Collado (from (Portugal) Gil Vicente, previously on loan at Eldense)
8	MF	ESP	Yayo (from Real Oviedo, previously on loan at Lugo)
10	MF	ESP	Luis Chacón (on loan from Deportivo La Coruña, loan extended)
11	MF	ESP	Paco Cortés (on loan from Levante)
13	GK	ESP	Edgar Badia (from Tenerife)
15	FW	BRA	Lucas Ribeiro (from (South Africa) Mamelodi Sundowns)
16	DF	POR	Tomás Ribeiro (from (Portugal) Farense)
17	DF	ESP	Iván Calero (from Zaragoza)
18	FW	ROU	Daniel Paraschiv (on loan from Real Oviedo)
19	FW	ESP	Rubén Sobrino (from Cádiz)
20	FW	ESP	Rafa Tresaco (from Zamora)
21	DF	ESP	Roger Hinojo (on loan from Espanyol)
23	MF	GUI	Selu Diallo (on loan from Alavés, previously on loan at Atlético Madrid B)
26	GK	ESP	Arnau Rafús (from Valladolid)
28	MF	ARG	Thiago Ojeda (on loan from Villarreal)
33	DF	ESP	Juan Larios (on loan from (England) Southampton)
26	DF	CRO	Matía Barzic (on loan from Elche, previously on loan at Eldense)

Out:

No.	Pos.	Nation	Player
2	DF	ESP	Guzmán Ortega (on loan to Avilés Industrial)
6	MF	ESP	Kevin Presa (released)
7	MF	ESP	Carlos Calderón (released)
8	MF	ESP	Diego Barri (to Castellón)
11	MF	ESP	Santi Samanes (released)
13	GK	ESP	Alejandro Amigo (released)
15	DF	ESP	Víctor Ruiz (released)
17	DF	ESP	Álvaro Martínez (to (Portugal) Moreirense)
18	DF	ESP	Lanchi (released)
19	FW	ESP	Antón Escobar (released)
20	MF	ESP	Txus Alba (to Lugo)
21	MF	ESP	Juan Artola (released)
27	MF	ESP	Adrián Ruiz (on loan to Marbella)
—	FW	ESP	David López (on loan to Alcalá)

=== Deportivo La Coruña ===
In:

No.	Pos.	Nation	Player
3	DF	ESP	Arnau Comas (from (Switzerland) Basel, previously on loan at Eibar)
4	DF	BEL	Lucas Noubi (from (Belgium) Standard Liège)
7	FW	ITA	Samuele Mulattieri (on loan from (Italy) Sassuolo)
12	DF	ITA	Giacomo Quagliata (from (Italy) Cremonese, previously on loan at (Italy) Catanzaro)
15	DF	ESP	Miguel Loureiro (from Huesca)
16	MF	ESP	José Gragera (on loan from Espanyol)
19	MF	ESP	Luismi Cruz (from Tenerife)
22	MF	ESP	Stoichkov (on loan from Granada)
25	GK	AUT	Daniel Bachmann (on loan from (England) Watford)
—	MF	ESP	Jairo Noriega (from Ourense)

Out:

No.	Pos.	Nation	Player
2	MF	AUS	Denis Genreau (to (Australia) Melbourne Victory)
6	DF	ESP	Álex Petxarroman (on loan to Andorra)
9	FW	ESP	Iván Barbero (to (Portugal) Arouca)
11	DF	SRB	Nemanja Tošić (loan return to (Switzerland) Zürich)
12	MF	COD	Omenuke Mfulu (released)
15	DF	ESP	Pablo Vázquez (to Sporting Gijón)
16	MF	ARG	Juan Gauto (loan return to (Switzerland) Basel)
22	FW	MAR	Mohamed Bouldini (on loan to Granada)
22	MF	ESP	Hugo Rama (released)
25	GK	BRA	Helton Leite (to (Brazil) Fortaleza)
32	FW	ESP	Kevin Sánchez (on loan to Cartagena)
33	DF	ESP	Rafa Obrador (loan return to Real Madrid, later sold to (Portugal) Benfica)
—	DF	GBS	Iano Imbeni (to (Portugal) Penafiel, previously on loan at Arenteiro)
—	MF	ESP	Luis Chacón (on loan to Cultural Leonesa, loan extended)
—	MF	ESP	Davo (released, previously on loan at Real Murcia)
—	MF	ESP	Diego Gómez (on loan to Cartagena, previously on loan at Arenteiro)
—	MF	ESP	Pablo Muñoz (to Guadalajara, previously on loan at Marbella)
—	MF	ESP	Jairo Noriega (on loan to Racing Ferrol)
—	FW	ESP	Raúl Alcaina (to (Portugal) Penafiel, previously on loan at Real Murcia)
—	FW	ESP	Martín Ochoa (on loan to Arenteiro)

=== Eibar ===
In:

No.	Pos.	Nation	Player
1	GK	ESP	Luis López (from Mirandés)
11	MF	ESP	Jon Magunazelaia (from Real Sociedad, previously on loan at Córdoba)
14	MF	ESP	Lander Olaetxea (from Sporting Gijón)
15	DF	POR	Jair Amador (from Zaragoza)
18	MF	ESP	Malcom Adu Ares (from Athletic Bilbao, previously on loan at Zaragoza)
20	FW	ESP	Javier Martón (from Athletic Bilbao, previously on loan at Albacete)
21	DF	ESP	Marcos Moreno (from (Portugal) Farense)
22	DF	ESP	Álvaro Rodríguez (from Albacete)
24	DF	POR	Leonardo Buta (on loan from (Italy) Udinese, previously on loan at (Portugal) Moreirense)
30	MF	ESP	Aleix Garrido (from Barcelona)

Out:

No.	Pos.	Nation	Player
1	GK	ESP	Álex Domínguez (loan return to (France) Toulouse)
3	DF	ESP	Cristian Gutiérrez (to Las Palmas)
4	DF	ESP	Álvaro Carrillo (to Huesca)
5	DF	ESP	Chema (released)
11	FW	ESP	Jorge Pascual (loan return to Villarreal, later sold to Granada)
12	MF	ESP	Iván Gil (loan return to Las Palmas)
15	DF	ESP	Arnau Comas (loan return to (Switzerland) Basel, later sold to Deportivo La Coruña)
18	MF	ESP	Martín Merquelanz (released)
20	FW	ESP	Antonio Puertas (to Albacete)
31	MF	ESP	Ángel Troncho (on loan to Arenas Club)
—	MF	VEN	Jorge Yriarte (to (Poland) Śląsk Wrocław, previously on loan at Real Murcia)
—	FW	BUL	Slavy (to Hércules, previously on loan at Villarreal B)

=== Granada ===
In:

No.	Pos.	Nation	Player
2	DF	ESP	Pau Casadesús (from Andorra)
3	DF	ESP	Diego Hormigo (from Sevilla)
4	MF	ESP	Rubén Alcaraz (from Cádiz)
7	DF	ESP	Álex Sola (from Getafe)
8	MF	ESP	Pedro Alemañ (from Valencia B)
10	MF	MAR	Mohamed Bouldini (on loan from Deportivo La Coruña)
11	MF	ESP	José Arnaiz (from Osasuna)
13	GK	ESP	Ander Astralaga (on loan from Barcelona)
17	FW	SEN	Souleymane Faye (from Real Betis B)
19	FW	ESP	Jorge Pascual (from Villarreal, previously on loan at Eibar)
21	MF	ESP	Pablo Sáenz (loan return from Albacete)
22	DF	SEN	Baïla Diallo (from (France) Clermont Foot)
23	MF	GEO	Luka Gagnidze (on loan from (Russia) Dynamo Moscow, previously on loan at (Russia) Krylia Sovetov Samara)

Out:

No.	Pos.	Nation	Player
1	GK	ESP	Marc Martínez (released)
2	DF	ESP	Rubén Sánchez (loan return to Espanyol)
3	DF	ESP	Miguel Ángel Brau (to (England) Coventry City)
4	DF	ESP	Miguel Rubio (to Espanyol)
5	DF	ESP	Pablo Insua (to Zaragoza)
7	FW	ARG	Lucas Boyé (to Alavés)
8	MF	ESP	Gonzalo Villar (to (Croatia) Dinamo Zagreb)
9	FW	ISR	Shon Weissman (released)
10	MF	ESP	Stoichkov (on loan to Deportivo La Coruña)
11	MF	GEO	Giorgi Tsitaishvili (loan return to (France) Metz)
12	DF	ESP	Ricard Sánchez (released)
15	DF	ESP	Carlos Neva (to Albacete)
17	FW	ESP	Borja Bastón (released)
18	MF	POL	Kamil Jóźwiak (released)
19	FW	BRA	Reinier Jesus (loan return to Real Madrid, later sold to (Brazil) Atlético Mineiro)
21	MF	ALG	Abde Rebbach (loan return to Alavés)
25	GK	ESP	Diego Mariño (to Albacete)
30	FW	ESP	Siren Diao (loan return to (Italy) Atalanta U23)
—	MF	ESP	Gerard Gumbau (on loan to Rayo Vallecano, loan extended)

=== Huesca ===
In:

No.	Pos.	Nation	Player
3	DF	ESP	Ro Abajas (from Valencia)
4	DF	ESP	Álvaro Carrillo (from Eibar)
5	DF	ESP	Íñigo Piña (from Eldense)
9	FW	ESP	Sergi Enrich (from Zaragoza, previously on loan)
11	MF	ESP	Liberto Beltrán (from Mérida)
15	DF	ESP	Hugo Pérez (on loan from Espanyol)
16	MF	ESP	Jesús Álvarez (from Ibiza)
17	DF	ESP	Julio Alonso (from Mirandés)
18	FW	ESP	Enol Rodríguez (from Arenteiro)
19	FW	FRA	Samuel Ntamack (from (France) Annecy, previously on loan at (Belgium) Lokeren)
20	MF	ESP	Francisco Portillo (from Real Oviedo)
21	MF	ESP	Dani Ojeda (from Burgos)
28	DF	ESP	Sergio Arribas (on loan from Real Betis)
30	GK	ESP	Dani Martín (on loan from Levante, previously on loan at Marbella)
33	MF	COL	Daniel Luna (on loan from Mallorca, previously on loan at Cartagena)
38	MF	ARG	Gustavo Albarracín (on loan from Alavés)

Out:

No.	Pos.	Nation	Player
4	DF	ESP	Rubén Pulido (to Leganés)
5	DF	ESP	Miguel Loureiro (to Deportivo La Coruña)
7	MF	ESP	Gerard Valentín (to (Qatar) Al-Wakrah)
10	MF	ESP	Hugo Vallejo (to (Poland) Piast Gliwice)
11	MF	ESP	Joaquín Muñoz (to Málaga)
15	DF	FRA	Jérémy Blasco (to (Poland) Radomiak Radom)
18	DF	ESP	Diego González (to Ceuta)
19	MF	CMR	Patrick Soko (to Almería)
20	DF	ESP	Ignasi Vilarrasa (to Córdoba)
29	MF	ESP	Jaime Escario (on loan to (Portugal) Penafiel)
33	FW	MAR	Ayman Arguigue (on loan to Teruel)

=== Las Palmas ===
In:

No.	Pos.	Nation	Player
5	DF	ESP	Enrique Clemente (loan return from Zaragoza)
6	DF	ESP	Sergio Barcia (on loan from (Poland) Legia Warsaw)
8	MF	ESP	Iván Gil (loan return from Eibar)
9	MF	URU	Jeremía Recoba (from (Uruguay) Nacional)
10	MF	ESP	Jesé (from (Malaysia) Johor Darul Ta'zim)
13	GK	ESP	José Antonio Caro (from Cádiz)
16	MF	ITA	Lorenzo Amatucci (on loan from (Italy) Fiorentina, previously on loan at (Italy) Salernitana)
18	MF	PAN	Edward Cedeño (from (Panama) Potros del Este, previously on loan at Tarazona)
21	MF	ESP	Jonathan Viera (from (Malaysia) Johor Darul Ta'zim)
23	DF	ESP	Cristian Gutiérrez (from Eibar)
25	FW	SRB	Miloš Luković (on loan from (France) Strasbourg, previously on loan at (Netherlands) Heerenveen)
29	FW	ESP	Adam Arvelo (from (Portugal) Sporting CP B)
35	GK	ESP	Adrián Suárez (from Villarreal C)

Out:

No.	Pos.	Nation	Player
1	GK	NED	Jasper Cillessen (to (Netherlands) NEC)
5	MF	ESP	Javi Muñoz (to Getafe)
7	FW	GUI	Sory Kaba (released)
10	MF	ESP	Alberto Moleiro (to Villarreal)
16	FW	SCO	Oli McBurnie (to (England) Hull City)
23	DF	ESP	Álex Muñoz (to Almería)
25	GK	ESP	Álvaro Valles (to Real Betis)
26	MF	CIV	Aboubacar Bassinga (on loan to Ceuta)
32	FW	SEN	Saliou Mendiang (on loan to Barakaldo)
—	FW	CMR	Iván Cédric (on loan to (Turkey) Vanspor F.K., previously on loan at Barcelona Atlètic)

=== Leganés ===
In:

No.	Pos.	Nation	Player
2	DF	ESP	Marvel (from Real Madrid B, previously on loan at Córdoba)
4	DF	ESP	Rubén Pulido (from Huesca)
5	DF	ESP	Ignasi Miquel (from Levante)
6	DF	ESP	Lalo Aguilar (loan return from Albacete)
7	DF	ESP	Rubén Peña (from Osasuna)
13	GK	ESP	Miguel San Román (from Elche)
16	MF	ESP	Gonzalo Melero (from Almería)
18	MF	BEL	Benjamin Pauwels (from (Netherlands) Cambuur)
20	MF	ESP	Óscar Plano (from Elche)
21	MF	ESP	Andrés Campos (from Real Madrid Castilla)
22	DF	URU	Sebastián Figueredo (from (Uruguay) Montevideo Wanderers)
23	FW	ESP	Álex Millán (from Cartagena)
24	MF	GUI	Amadou Diawara (from Eldense)

Out:

No.	Pos.	Nation	Player
6	DF	ESP	Sergio González (released)
10	MF	ESP	Dani Raba (to Valencia)
13	GK	SRB	Marko Dmitrović (to Espanyol)
14	MF	SRB	Darko Brašanac (to Málaga)
17	MF	CMR	Yvan Neyou (to Getafe)
20	DF	ESP	Javi Hernández (on loan to (Qatar) Al-Arabi)
30	MF	CIV	Yan Diomande (to (Germany) RB Leipzig)
—	GK	ESP	Alvin Abajas (on loan to Arenteiro)

=== Málaga ===
In:

No.	Pos.	Nation	Player
5	MF	SRB	Darko Brašanac (from Leganés)
11	MF	ESP	Joaquín Muñoz (from Huesca)
12	MF	ESP	Carlos Dotor (on loan from Celta Vigo, previously on loan at Sporting Gijón)
17	FW	ESP	Eneko Jauregi (from Racing Ferrol)
20	DF	ESP	Javi Montero (from Racing Santander)
21	FW	ESP	Adrián Niño (from Atlético Madrid)

Out:

No.	Pos.	Nation	Player
11	MF	ESP	Kevin Medina (to Córdoba)
12	MF	ESP	Manu Molina (released)
17	FW	ESP	Dioni (released)
20	DF	POR	Nélson Monte (to Almería)
26	MF	ESP	Antonio Cordero (to (England) Newcastle United)
—	FW	ESP	Juan Hernández (released, previously on loan at Algeciras)

=== Mirandés ===
In:

No.	Pos.	Nation	Player
1	GK	MNE	Igor Nikić (from (Montenegro) Dečić)
2	DF	ESP	Hugo Novoa (on loan from Alavés)
3	DF	ESP	Fernando Medrano (from Tenerife)
4	DF	ESP	Martín Pascual (from Atlético Madrid B)
5	DF	ESP	Adrián Pica (on loan from Alavés)
6	MF	URU	Thiago Helguera (on loan from (Portugal) Braga)
7	MF	ESP	Iker Varela (on loan from Athletic Bilbao)
8	MF	ESP	Aarón Martín (on loan from (Saudi Arabia) Al Qadsiah, previously on loan at Tenerife)
9	FW	URU	Gonzalo Petit (on loan from Real Betis)
10	FW	ESP	Carlos Fernández (on loan from Real Sociedad, previously on loan at Cádiz)
11	MF	ESP	Álex Cardero (on loan from Real Oviedo)
13	GK	ESP	Juan Palomares (from Mérida)
14	FW	ESP	Alberto Marí (on loan from Valencia, previously on loan at Zaragoza)
17	DF	ESP	Pablo Pérez (on loan from Atlético Madrid B)
18	MF	ESP	Ismael Barea (on loan from Real Betis)
19	MF	ESP	Marino Illescas (from Algeciras)
20	FW	CMR	Etienne Eto'o (on loan from Rayo Vallecano)
24	DF	ESP	Iker Córdoba (on loan from Valencia)
26	MF	ESP	Rafel Bauzà (on loan from Espanyol)
27	MF	ESP	Toni Tamarit (on loan from Villarreal B)
29	MF	ESP	Pablo López (on loan from Valencia)
30	FW	MAR	Salim El Jebari (on loan from Atlético Madrid, previously on loan at Cartagena)

Out:

No.	Pos.	Nation	Player
1	GK	ESP	Luis López (to Eibar)
2	DF	ESP	Hugo Rincón (loan return to Athletic Bilbao, later loaned to Girona)
3	DF	ESP	Julio Alonso (to Huesca)
5	DF	ESP	Tachi (to Zaragoza)
8	MF	ESP	Carlo Adriano (loan return to Villarreal, later sold to (Mexico) Querétaro)
9	FW	ARG	Joaquín Panichelli (loan return to Alavés, later sold to (France) Strasbourg)
10	MF	ESP	Alberto Reina (to Real Oviedo)
13	GK	ESP	Raúl Fernández (to Alavés)
15	DF	ESP	Pablo Tomeo (to Valladolid)
19	MF	FRA	Mathis Lachuer (to Valladolid)
20	MF	ESP	Ander Martín (loan return to Burgos, later released)

=== Racing Santander ===
In:

No.	Pos.	Nation	Player
12	FW	ESP	Asier Villalibre (on loan from Alavés)
13	GK	BUL	Plamen Andreev (on loan from (Netherlands) Feyenoord)
16	DF	URU	Facundo González (on loan from (Italy) Juventus, previously on loan at (Netherlands) Feyenoord)
18	MF	ESP	Peio Canales (on loan from Athletic Bilbao)
19	MF	COL	Gustavo Puerta (from (Germany) Bayer Leverkusen, previously on loan at (England) Hull City)
21	DF	ESP	Pablo Ramón (on loan from Espanyol)

Out:

No.	Pos.	Nation	Player
16	FW	ESP	Rober (loan return to (Netherlands) NEC)
19	FW	ESP	Jon Karrikaburu (loan return to Real Sociedad)
21	MF	ESP	Unai Vencedor (loan return to Athletic Bilbao)
22	FW	ESP	Pablo Rodríguez (loan return to (Italy) Lecce)
23	MF	ESP	Víctor Meseguer (loan return to Valladolid)
24	DF	ESP	Javi Montero (to Málaga)

=== Real Sociedad B ===
In:

No.	Pos.	Nation	Player
15	DF	JPN	Kazunari Kita (on loan from (Japan) Kyoto Sanga)

Out:

No.	Pos.	Nation	Player
14	DF	ESP	Ibrahima Cámara (released)
21	DF	ESP	Jon Merino (to Lugo)

=== Sporting Gijón ===
In:

No.	Pos.	Nation	Player
4	DF	FRA	Lucas Perrin (from (Germany) Hamburger SV, previously on loan at (Belgium) Cercle Brugge)
9	FW	ECU	Jordy Caicedo (on loan from (Mexico) Atlas, loan extended)
14	MF	ESP	Álex Corredera (from (Russia) Khimki)
15	DF	ESP	Pablo Vázquez (from Deportivo La Coruña)
16	MF	COL	Óscar Cortés (on loan from (Scotland) Rangers)
17	FW	BEL	Jonathan Dubasin (from (Switzerland) Basel, previously on loan)
18	MF	ESP	César Gelabert (from (France) Toulouse, previously on loan)
21	MF	SEN	Mamadou Loum (from (Portugal) Arouca)
24	MF	CAN	Justin Smith (on loan from Espanyol)

Out:

No.	Pos.	Nation	Player
4	DF	ESP	Róber Pier (to (Mexico) Atlas)
10	MF	ESP	Nacho Méndez (released)
12	MF	ESP	Carlos Dotor (loaned return to Celta Vigo, later loaned to Málaga)
14	MF	ESP	Lander Olaetxea (to Eibar)

=== Valladolid ===
In:

No.	Pos.	Nation	Player
2	DF	ESP	Trilli (from Barcelona B)
3	DF	ESP	Guille Bueno (from (Germany) Borussia Dortmund, previously on loan at (Germany) Darmstadt 98)
6	MF	FRA	Mathis Lachuer (from Mirandés)
7	MF	ESP	Sergi Canós (on loan from Valencia)
8	MF	ESP	Víctor Meseguer (loan return from Racing Santander)
13	GK	POR	Guilherme Fernandes (on loan from Real Betis B)
14	MF	ESP	Iván Alejo (from (Cyprus) APOEL, previously sold from Cádiz)
15	DF	ESP	Pablo Tomeo (from Mirandés)
21	MF	FRA	Julien Ponceau (from (France) Lorient)
22	MF	DOM	Peter Federico (on loan from Getafe)
23	DF	MAR	Mohamed Jaouab (from (France) Rennes, previously on loan at (France) Amiens)

Out:

No.	Pos.	Nation	Player
1	GK	POR	André Ferreira (released)
6	DF	TUR	Cenk Özkacar (loan return to Valenica, later loaned to (Germany) 1. FC Köln)
6	MF	HUN	Tamás Nikitscher (to (Portugal) Rio Ave)
7	FW	SEN	Mamadou Sylla (to (Saudi Arabia) Al-Riyadh)
11	MF	ESP	Raúl Moro (to (Netherlands) Ajax)
12	MF	ESP	Mario Martín (loan return to Real Madrid, later loaned to Getafe)
18	MF	VEN	Darwin Machís (released)
21	MF	MAR	Selim Amallah (released)
23	MF	MAR	Anuar Tuhami (to Ceuta)
24	FW	BRA	Kenedy (on loan to (Mexico) Pachuca)
26	GK	ESP	Arnau Rafús (to Cultural Leonesa)

=== Zaragoza ===
In:

No.	Pos.	Nation	Player
1	GK	ARG	Esteban Andrada (on loan from (Mexico) Monterrey)
2	DF	ESP	Juan Sebastián (loan return from Alcorcón)
4	DF	ESP	Pablo Insua (from Granada)
5	DF	ESP	Tachi (from Mirandés)
12	FW	TUR	Sinan Bakış (loan return from (Poland) Górnik Zabrze)
13	GK	ARG	Adrián Rodríguez (on loan from Alavés)
15	DF	ESP	Carlos Pomares (from Real Oviedo)
16	DF	SRB	Aleksandar Radovanović (from Almería)
17	MF	ESP	Sebas Moyano (from Real Oviedo)
18	MF	ESP	Paulino (from Real Oviedo)
19	FW	BIH	Kenan Kodro (on loan from (Hungary) Ferencváros, previously on loan at (Turkey) Gaziantep)
20	DF	ESP	Martín Aguirregabiria (from Cartagena)
21	DF	ESP	Valery Fernández (from Girona, previously on loan at Mallorca)
24	MF	CIV	Paul Akouokou (on loan from (France) Lyon)

Out:

No.	Pos.	Nation	Player
2	DF	ESP	Marcos Luna (to Almería)
3	DF	POR	Jair Amador (to Eibar)
5	DF	ESP	Enrique Clemente (loan return to Las Palmas)
13	GK	FRA	Gaëtan Poussin (to (France) Red Star)
15	DF	POR	Bernardo Vital (to (Poland) Jagiellonia Białystok)
16	MF	HON	Kervin Arriaga (loan return to (Serbia) Partizan, later sold to Levante)
17	DF	ESP	Carlos Nieto (released)
18	FW	ESP	Alberto Marí (loan return to Valencia, later loaned to Mirandés)
19	DF	ESP	Iván Calero (to Cultural Leonesa)
20	MF	ESP	Malcom Adu Ares (loan return to Athletic Bilbao, later sold to Eibar)
23	MF	ESP	Ager Aketxe (to (Malaysia) Johor Darul Ta'zim)
24	DF	ESP	Lluís López (to (China) Shandong Taishan)
25	GK	ESP	Joan Femenías (released)
28	MF	ESP	Gori (to Juventud de Torremolinos, previously on loan at Ibiza)
33	MF	ESP	Adrián Liso (on loan to Getafe)
38	DF	ESP	Jaime Vallejo (on loan to Eldense)
—	DF	ESP	Andrés Borge (released, previously on loan at Arenteiro)
—	FW	ESP	Sergi Enrich (to Huesca, previously on loan)

== See also ==
- 2025–26 Segunda División
- List of La Liga football transfers summer 2025
