= List of Spanish football transfers summer 2025 =

This is a list of Spanish football transfers for the 2025 summer transfer window. Only transfers featuring La Liga are listed, for Segunda División see List of Segunda División football transfers summer 2025.

== La Liga ==
Note: Flags indicate national team as has been defined under FIFA eligibility rules. Players may hold more than one non-FIFA nationality.

=== Alavés ===
In:

| No. | Pos. | Nation | Player |
|---|---|---|---|
| 3 | DF | MAR | Yusi (from Real Madrid Castilla) |
| 4 | MF | ESP | Denis Suárez (from Villarreal) |
| 5 | DF | ESP | Jon Pacheco (on loan from Real Sociedad) |
| 9 | FW | DOM | Mariano Díaz (free agent) |
| 10 | MF | ESP | Carles Aleñá (from Getafe, previously on loan) |
| 13 | GK | ESP | Raúl Fernández (from Mirandés) |
| 15 | FW | ARG | Lucas Boyé (from Granada) |
| 17 | DF | ESP | Jonny Otto (from (Greece) PAOK) |
| 19 | MF | ESP | Pablo Ibáñez (from Osasuna) |
| 20 | MF | BRA | Calebe (on loan from (Brazil) Fortaleza) |
| 21 | MF | ALG | Abde Rebbach (loan return from Granada) |
| — | MF | ARG | Gustavo Albarracín (from (Argentina) Talleres) |
| — | FW | ESP | Dennis Rufo (from Zaragoza B) |

Out:

| No. | Pos. | Nation | Player |
|---|---|---|---|
| 3 | DF | ESP | Manu Sánchez (loan return to Celta Vigo, later loaned to Levante) |
| 4 | DF | SRB | Aleksandar Sedlar (released) |
| 5 | DF | MAR | Abdel Abqar (to Getafe) |
| 9 | FW | ESP | Asier Villalibre (on loan to Racing Santander) |
| 10 | MF | ARG | Tomás Conechny (to (Argentina) Racing Club) |
| 12 | DF | URU | Santiago Mouriño (to Atlético Madrid, later sold to Villarreal) |
| 13 | GK | GEQ | Jesús Owono (on loan to Andorra) |
| 15 | FW | ESP | Carlos Martín (loan return to Atlético Madrid) |
| 16 | DF | ESP | Hugo Novoa (on loan to Mirandés) |
| 17 | FW | ESP | Kike García (to Espanyol) |
| 19 | FW | ESP | Pau Cabanes (loan return to Villarreal) |
| 24 | MF | ESP | Joan Jordán (loan return to Sevilla) |
| 30 | MF | ESP | Tomás Mendes (on loan to (Portugal) Alverca) |
| 31 | GK | ARG | Adrián Rodríguez (on loan to Zaragoza) |
| 36 | DF | ESP | Adrián Pica (on loan to Mirandés) |
| 37 | MF | DOM | José de León (on loan to Barakaldo) |
| — | MF | ARG | Gustavo Albarracín (on loan to Huesca) |
| — | MF | GUI | Selu Diallo (on loan to Cultural Leonesa, previously on loan at Atlético Madrid B) |
| — | MF | ESP | Unai Ropero (on loan to Hérculers, previously on loan at Eldense) |
| — | FW | ARG | Joaquín Panichelli (to (France) Strasbourg, previously on loan at Mirandés) |

=== Athletic Bilbao ===
In:

| No. | Pos. | Nation | Player |
|---|---|---|---|
| 12 | DF | ESP | Jesús Areso (from Osasuna) |
| 23 | MF | ESP | Robert Navarro (from Mallorca) |
| 27 | GK | MEX | Alex Padilla (loan return from (Mexico) Pumas UNAM) |

Out:

| No. | Pos. | Nation | Player |
|---|---|---|---|
| 11 | FW | ESP | Álvaro Djaló (on loan to (Qatar) Al-Gharafa) |
| 13 | GK | ESP | Julen Agirrezabala (on loan to Valencia) |
| 14 | DF | ESP | Unai Nuñez (loan return to Celta Vigo, later loaned to (Italy) Hellas Verona) |
| 19 | FW | ESP | Javier Martón (to Eibar, previously on loan at Albacete) |
| 23 | MF | ESP | Malcom Adu Ares (to Eibar, previously on loan at Zaragoza) |
| 28 | MF | ESP | Peio Canales (on loan to Racing Santander) |
| 33 | FW | ESP | Aingeru Olabarrieta (on loan to Andorra) |
| — | GK | ESP | Oier Gastesi (on loan to Arenas Club) |
| — | DF | ESP | Hugo Rincón (on loan to Girona, previously on loan at Mirandés) |
| — | MF | ESP | Beñat Gerenabarrena (on loan to Castellón) |
| — | MF | ESP | Iker Varela (on loan to Mirandés) |
| — | MF | ESP | Unai Vencedor (on loan to Levante, previously on loan at Racing Santander) |

=== Atlético Madrid ===
In:

| No. | Pos. | Nation | Player |
|---|---|---|---|
| 1 | GK | ARG | Juan Musso (from (Italy) Atalanta, previously on loan) |
| 3 | DF | ITA | Matteo Ruggeri (from (Italy) Atalanta) |
| 5 | MF | USA | Johnny Cardoso (from Real Betis) |
| 10 | MF | ESP | Álex Baena (from Villarreal) |
| 11 | MF | ARG | Thiago Almada (from (Brazil) Botafogo, previously on loan at (France) Lyon) |
| 12 | FW | ESP | Carlos Martín (loan return from Alavés) |
| 15 | DF | FRA | Clément Lenglet (from Barcelona, previously on loan) |
| 17 | DF | SVK | Dávid Hancko (from (Netherlands) Feyenoord) |
| 18 | DF | ESP | Marc Pubill (from Almería) |
| 22 | FW | ITA | Giacomo Raspadori (from (Italy) Napoli) |
| 23 | MF | ARG | Nico González (on loan from (Italy) Juventus) |
| — | DF | URU | Santiago Mouriño (from Deportivo Alavés) |

Out:

| No. | Pos. | Nation | Player |
|---|---|---|---|
| 3 | DF | ESP | César Azpilicueta (to Sevilla) |
| 5 | MF | ARG | Rodrigo De Paul (on loan to (United States) Inter Miami) |
| 10 | FW | ARG | Ángel Correa (to (Mexico) Tigres) |
| 11 | MF | FRA | Thomas Lemar (on loan to Girona) |
| 12 | DF | BRA | Samuel Lino (to (Brazil) Flamengo) |
| 17 | MF | ESP | Rodrigo Riquelme (to Real Betis) |
| 20 | DF | BEL | Axel Witsel (to Girona) |
| 23 | DF | MOZ | Reinildo Mandava (to (England) Sunderland) |
| 32 | FW | ESP | Adrián Niño (to Málaga) |
| — | GK | ROU | Horațiu Moldovan (on loan to Real Oviedo, previously on loan at (Italy) Sassuolo) |
| — | DF | URU | Santiago Mouriño (to Villarreal) |
| — | MF | ESP | Víctor Mollejo (to Burgos) |
| — | MF | ESP | Saúl (to (Brazil) Flamengo, previously on loan at Sevilla) |
| — | MF | BEL | Arthur Vermeeren (to (Germany) RB Leipzig, previously on loan) |
| — | FW | MAR | Salim El Jebari (on loan to Mirandés, previously on loan at Cartagena) |

=== Barcelona ===
In:

| No. | Pos. | Nation | Player |
|---|---|---|---|
| 13 | GK | ESP | Joan García (from Espanyol) |
| 14 | FW | ENG | Marcus Rashford (on loan from (England) Manchester United) |
| 28 | MF | SWE | Roony Bardghji (from (Denmark) Copenhagen) |
| — | MF | ESP | Oriol Romeu (loan return from Girona) |

Out:

| No. | Pos. | Nation | Player |
|---|---|---|---|
| 5 | DF | ESP | Iñigo Martínez (to (Saudi Arabia) Al-Nassr) |
| 10 | FW | ESP | Ansu Fati (on loan to (France) Monaco) |
| 13 | GK | ESP | Iñaki Peña (on loan to Elche) |
| 14 | MF | ESP | Pablo Torre (to Mallorca) |
| 18 | FW | ESP | Pau Víctor (to (Portugal) Braga) |
| 26 | GK | ESP | Ander Astralaga (on loan to Granada) |
| 29 | MF | ESP | Aleix Garrido (to Eibar) |
| 32 | DF | ESP | Héctor Fort (on loan to Elche) |
| 34 | MF | GER | Noah Darvich (to (Germany) VfB Stuttgart) |
| 36 | DF | ESP | Sergi Domínguez (to (Croatia) Dinamo Zagreb) |
| 40 | GK | HUN | Áron Yaakobishvili (on loan to Andorra) |
| — | DF | FRA | Clément Lenglet (to Atlético Madrid, previously on loan) |
| — | MF | ESP | Álex Valle (to (Italy) Como, previously on loan) |
| — | FW | ESP | Alan Godoy (on loan to (Portugal) Estrela da Amadora) |
| — | MF | ESP | Jan Virgili (to Mallorca) |

=== Celta Vigo ===
In:

| No. | Pos. | Nation | Player |
|---|---|---|---|
| 6 | MF | GUI | Ilaix Moriba (from (Germany) RB Leipzig, previously on loan) |
| 7 | FW | ESP | Borja Iglesias (from Real Betis, previously on loan) |
| 9 | FW | ESP | Ferran Jutglà (from (Belgium) Club Brugge) |
| 13 | GK | ROU | Ionuț Radu (from (Italy) Venezia) |
| 15 | MF | ESP | Bryan Zaragoza (on loan from (Germany) Bayern Munich, previously on loan at Osasuna) |
| 17 | DF | ESP | Javi Rueda (loan return from Albacete) |

Out:

| No. | Pos. | Nation | Player |
|---|---|---|---|
| 12 | MF | ESP | Alfon (to Sevilla) |
| 13 | GK | ESP | Vicente Guaita (released) |
| 14 | MF | ESP | Iker Losada (loan return to Real Betis, later loaned to Levante) |
| 16 | MF | BRA | Jailson (released) |
| 22 | DF | ESP | Javier Manquillo (released) |
| 28 | MF | ESP | Fer López (to (England) Wolverhampton Wanderers) |
| — | DF | ESP | Unai Nuñez (on loan to (Italy) Hellas Verona, previously on loan at Athletic Bilbao) |
| — | DF | ESP | Manu Sánchez (on loan to Levante, previously on loan at Alavés) |
| — | MF | ESP | Carlos Dotor (on loan to Málaga, previously on loan at Sporting Gijón) |
| — | FW | ESP | Carles Pérez (on loan to (Greece) Aris, previously on loan at Getafe) |
| — | FW | NOR | Jørgen Strand Larsen (to (England) Wolverhampton Wanderers, previously on loan) |

=== Elche ===
In:

| No. | Pos. | Nation | Player |
|---|---|---|---|
| 3 | DF | ESP | Adrià Pedrosa (on loan from Sevilla) |
| 5 | MF | ARG | Federico Redondo (from (United States) Inter Miami) |
| 9 | FW | POR | André Silva (from (Germany) RB Leipzig, previously on loan at (Germany) Werder Bremen) |
| 10 | FW | ESP | Rafa Mir (on loan from Sevilla, previously on loan at Valencia) |
| 11 | MF | ESP | Germán Valera (from Valencia, previously on loan) |
| 13 | GK | ESP | Iñaki Peña (on loan from Barcelona) |
| 16 | MF | POR | Martim Neto (from (Portugal) Benfica, previously on loan at (Portugal) Rio Ave) |
| 19 | FW | COD | Grady Diangana (from (England) West Bromwich Albion) |
| 20 | FW | URU | Álvaro Rodríguez (from Real Madrid, previously on loan at Getafe) |
| 21 | DF | FRA | Léo Pétrot (from (France) Saint-Étienne) |
| 23 | DF | ESP | Víctor Chust (on loan from Cádiz) |
| 39 | DF | ESP | Héctor Fort (on loan from Barcelona) |
| 45 | GK | ESP | Alejandro Iturbe (from Atlético Madrid B) |

Out:

| No. | Pos. | Nation | Player |
|---|---|---|---|
| 1 | GK | ESP | Miguel San Román (to Leganés) |
| 3 | DF | ESP | Jairo Izquierdo (released) |
| 7 | MF | ESP | Óscar Plano (to Leganés) |
| 10 | MF | ARG | Nicolás Fernández (to (United States) New York City FC) |
| 12 | DF | ESP | José Salinas (to Espanyol) |
| 16 | DF | ESP | Álex Martín (to Córdoba) |
| 21 | MF | ARG | Nicolás Castro (to (Mexico) Toluca) |
| — | DF | CRO | Matía Barzic (on loan to Cultural Leonesa, previously on loan at Eldense) |
| — | DF | ESP | Bakary Traoré (on loan to Tarazona) |
| — | MF | DOM | Rafa Núñez (on loan to Eldense, previously on loan at Cartagena) |

=== Espanyol ===
In:

| No. | Pos. | Nation | Player |
|---|---|---|---|
| 2 | DF | ESP | Rubén Sánchez (loan return from Granada) |
| 4 | MF | ESP | Urko González de Zárate (from Real Sociedad, previously on loan) |
| 9 | FW | ESP | Roberto Fernández (from (Portugal) Braga, previously on loan) |
| 12 | DF | ESP | José Salinas (from Elche) |
| 13 | GK | SRB | Marko Dmitrović (from Leganés) |
| 14 | MF | ESP | Ramon Terrats (on loan from Villarreal, previously on loan at Getafe) |
| 15 | DF | ESP | Miguel Rubio (from Granada) |
| 16 | MF | ITA | Luca Koleosho (on loan from (England) Burnley) |
| 18 | MF | COD | Charles Pickel (from (Italy) Cremonese) |
| 19 | FW | ESP | Kike García (from Alavés) |
| 22 | DF | ESP | Carlos Romero (on loan from Villarreal, loan extended) |
| 24 | FW | ENG | Tyrhys Dolan (from (England) Blackburn Rovers) |
| 38 | DF | GER | Clemens Riedel (from (Germany) Darmstadt 98) |
| — | DF | ESP | Hugo Pérez (from Villarreal B) |
| — | FW | ESP | Marcos Fernández (from Real Betis B) |

Out:

| No. | Pos. | Nation | Player |
|---|---|---|---|
| 1 | GK | ESP | Joan García (to Barcelona) |
| 3 | DF | ESP | Sergi Gómez (released) |
| 4 | DF | ALB | Marash Kumbulla (loan return to (Italy) Roma, later loaned to Mallorca) |
| 9 | FW | ARG | Alejo Véliz (loan return to (England) Tottenham Hotspur) |
| 12 | DF | ESP | Álvaro Tejero (to (Greece) Aris) |
| 13 | GK | ESP | Fernando Pacheco (released) |
| 14 | DF | ESP | Brian Oliván (released) |
| 15 | MF | ESP | José Gragera (on loan to Deportivo La Coruña) |
| 16 | FW | MAR | Walid Cheddira (loan return to (Italy) Napoli) |
| 18 | MF | ESP | Álvaro Aguado (released) |
| 20 | MF | CZE | Alex Král (loan return to (Germany) Union Berlin) |
| 28 | MF | ESP | Rafel Bauzà (on loan to Mirandés) |
| 31 | DF | ESP | Roger Hinojo (on loan to Cultural Leonesa) |
| 32 | FW | MAR | Omar Sadik (on loan to (France) Pau) |
| 40 | MF | CAN | Justin Smith (on loan to Sporting Gijón) |
| — | DF | ESP | Pablo Ramón (on loan to Racing Santander) |
| — | DF | ESP | Hugo Pérez (on loan to Huesca) |
| — | FW | ESP | Marcos Fernández (on loan to Ceuta) |
| — | FW | URU | Gastón Valles (released, previously on loan at Cartagena) |

=== Getafe ===
In:

| No. | Pos. | Nation | Player |
|---|---|---|---|
| 3 | DF | MAR | Abdel Abqar (from Alavés) |
| 4 | MF | CMR | Yvan Neyou (from Leganés) |
| 6 | MF | ESP | Mario Martín (on loan from Real Madrid, previously on loan at Valladolid) |
| 7 | FW | ESP | Juanmi (from Real Betis, previously on loan) |
| 11 | FW | ENG | Abu Kamara (on loan from (England) Hull City) |
| 14 | MF | ESP | Javi Muñoz (from Las Palmas) |
| 17 | DF | ESP | Kiko Femenía (from Villarreal) |
| 18 | MF | ESP | Álex Sancris (from Burgos) |
| 23 | MF | ESP | Adrián Liso (on loan from Zaragoza) |
| 26 | DF | ESP | Davinchi (from Recreativo) |

Out:

| No. | Pos. | Nation | Player |
|---|---|---|---|
| 4 | DF | ESP | Juan Berrocal (on loan to (United States) Atlanta United) |
| 7 | DF | ESP | Álex Sola (to Granada) |
| 10 | MF | NGR | Christantus Uche (on loan to (England) Crystal Palace) |
| 11 | MF | ESP | Ramon Terrats (loan return to Villarreal, later loaned to Espanyol) |
| 15 | DF | PAR | Omar Alderete (to (England) Sunderland) |
| 17 | FW | ESP | Carles Pérez (loan return to Celta Vigo, later loaned to (Greece) Aris) |
| 18 | FW | URU | Álvaro Rodríguez (loan return to Real Madrid, later sold to Elche) |
| 19 | MF | DOM | Peter Federico (on loan to Valladolid) |
| — | MF | ESP | Carles Aleñá (to Alavés, previously on loan) |

=== Girona ===
In:

| No. | Pos. | Nation | Player |
|---|---|---|---|
| 1 | GK | CRO | Dominik Livaković (on loan from (Turkey) Fenerbahçe) |
| 2 | DF | ESP | Hugo Rincón (on loan from Athletic Bilbao, previously on loan at Mirandés) |
| 11 | MF | FRA | Thomas Lemar (on loan from Atlético Madrid) |
| 12 | DF | BRA | Vitor Reis (on loan from (England) Manchester City) |
| 18 | MF | MAR | Azzedine Ounahi (from (France) Marseille, previously on loan at (Greece) Panathinaikos) |
| 19 | FW | UKR | Vladyslav Vanat (from (Ukraine) Dynamo Kyiv) |
| 20 | MF | BEL | Axel Witsel (from Atlético Madrid) |
| 21 | MF | ESP | Bryan Gil (from (England) Tottenham Hotspur, previously on loan) |
| 24 | DF | ESP | Àlex Moreno (from (England) Aston Villa, previously on loan at (England) Nottingham Forest) |

Out:

| No. | Pos. | Nation | Player |
|---|---|---|---|
| 3 | DF | ESP | Miguel Gutiérrez (to (Italy) Napoli) |
| 11 | FW | NED | Arnaut Danjuma (loan return to Villarreal, later sold to Valencia) |
| 12 | MF | BRA | Arthur (loan return to (Italy) Juventus) |
| 14 | MF | ESP | Oriol Romeu (loan return to Barcelona) |
| 15 | DF | ESP | Juanpe (to (Mexico) Atlético San Luis) |
| 18 | DF | CZE | Ladisalv Krejčí (on loan to (England) Wolverhampton Wanderers) |
| 19 | FW | MKD | Bojan Miovski (to (Scotland) Rangers) |
| 21 | MF | VEN | Yangel Herrera (to Real Sociedad) |
| 27 | MF | NED | Gabriel Misehouy (on loan to (Greece) Aris) |
| 29 | FW | KOR | Kim Min-su (on loan to Andorra) |
| 31 | FW | POR | Jastin García (on loan to Andorra) |
| 46 | FW | MTN | Dawda Camara (on loan to Cádiz) |
| — | GK | ESP | Toni Fuidias (on loan to Gimnàstic Tarragona, previously on loan at Cartagena) |
| — | DF | ESP | Valery Fernández (to Zaragoza, previously on loan at Mallorca) |
| — | MF | MAR | Ilyas Chaira (to Real Oviedo, previously on loan) |
| — | MF | MLI | Ibrahima Kébé (released, previously on loan at (Belgium) Lommel) |

=== Levante ===
In:

| No. | Pos. | Nation | Player |
|---|---|---|---|
| 2 | DF | ARG | Matías Moreno (on loan from (Italy) Fiorentina) |
| 3 | DF | URU | Alan Matturro (on loan from (Italy) Genoa) |
| 8 | MF | ESP | Jon Ander Olasagasti (from Real Sociedad) |
| 12 | MF | ESP | Unai Vencedor (on loan from Athletic Bilbao, previously on loan at Racing Santander) |
| 13 | GK | AUS | Mathew Ryan (from (France) Lens) |
| 15 | FW | CAF | Goduine Koyalipou (on loan from (France) Lens) |
| 16 | MF | HON | Kervin Arriaga (from (Serbia) Partizan, previously on loan at Zaragoza) |
| 17 | DF | ESP | Víctor García (from Eldense) |
| 18 | MF | ESP | Iker Losada (on loan from Real Betis, previously on loan at Celta Vigo) |
| 21 | FW | CMR | Karl Etta Eyong (from Villarreal) |
| 22 | DF | GER | Jeremy Toljan (from (Italy) Sassuolo) |
| 23 | DF | ESP | Manu Sánchez (on loan from Celta Vigo, previously on loan at Alavés) |

Out:

| No. | Pos. | Nation | Player |
|---|---|---|---|
| 1 | GK | ESP | Andrés Fernández (to Almería) |
| 6 | MF | GEO | Giorgi Kochorashvili (to (Portugal) Sporting CP) |
| 8 | MF | ESP | Ángel Algobia (to (Portugal) AVS) |
| 10 | MF | ESP | Vicente Iborra (retired) |
| 13 | GK | ESP | Alfonso Pastor (released) |
| 18 | DF | ESP | Ignasi Miquel (to Leganés) |
| 19 | FW | ESP | Álex Forés (loan return to Villarreal, later loaned to Real Oviedo) |
| 21 | MF | ESP | Sergio Lozano (to (Poland) Jagiellonia Białystok) |
| 22 | DF | ESP | Manu Sánchez (to Ceuta) |
| 29 | DF | ESP | Marcos Navarro (released) |
| 30 | MF | ESP | Víctor Jr. (on loan to Valencia B) |
| 37 | MF | ESP | Paco Cortés (on loan to Cultural Leonesa) |
| — | GK | ESP | Dani Martín (on loan to Huesca, previously on loan at Marbella) |
| — | MF | ESP | Óscar Clemente (to (Switzerland) Grasshopper, previously on loan at Cartagena) |

=== Mallorca ===
In:

| No. | Pos. | Nation | Player |
|---|---|---|---|
| 4 | DF | ALB | Marash Kumbulla (on loan from (Italy) Roma, previously on loan at Espanyol) |
| 13 | GK | FIN | Lucas Bergström (from (England) Chelsea) |
| 17 | MF | ESP | Jan Virgili (from Barcelona) |
| 18 | FW | ESP | Mateo Joseph (on loan from (England) Leeds United) |
| 20 | MF | ESP | Pablo Torre (from Barcelona) |

Out:

| No. | Pos. | Nation | Player |
|---|---|---|---|
| 1 | DF | SVK | Dominik Greif (to (France) Lyon) |
| 6 | DF | ESP | José Manuel Copete (to Valencia) |
| 16 | DF | ESP | Valery Fernández (loan return to Girona, later to Zaragoza) |
| 17 | FW | CAN | Cyle Larin (on loan to (Netherlands) Feyenoord) |
| 20 | MF | POR | Chiquinho (loan return to (England) Wolverhampton Wanderers, later sold to (Portugal) Alverca) |
| 27 | MF | ESP | Robert Navarro (to Athletic Bilbao) |
| 28 | MF | ESP | Jan Salas (on loan to Córdoba) |
| — | DF | BEL | Siebe Van der Heyden (to (Belgium) Gent, previously on loan at (Germany) FC St. Pauli) |
| — | MF | COL | Daniel Luna (on loan to Huesca, previously on loan at Cartagena) |

=== Osasuna ===
In:

| No. | Pos. | Nation | Player |
|---|---|---|---|
| 18 | FW | SUR | Sheraldo Becker (from Real Sociedad) |
| 21 | FW | ESP | Víctor Muñoz (from Real Madrid) |
| — | MF | ESP | Ander Yoldi (loan return from Córdoba) |

Out:

| No. | Pos. | Nation | Player |
|---|---|---|---|
| 8 | MF | ESP | Pablo Ibáñez (to Alavés) |
| 12 | DF | ESP | Jesús Areso (to Athletic Bilbao) |
| 15 | DF | ESP | Rubén Peña (to Leganés) |
| 20 | MF | ESP | José Arnaiz (to Granada) |
| 19 | MF | ESP | Bryan Zaragoza (loan return to (Germany) Bayern Munich, later loaned to Celta Vigo) |
| — | DF | ESP | Diego Moreno (released) |
| — | DF | ESP | Jorge Moreno (to Cádiz, previously on loan at Cartagena) |
| — | MF | ESP | Xabi Huarte (to (Portugal) Tondela) |

=== Rayo Vallecano ===
In:

| No. | Pos. | Nation | Player |
|---|---|---|---|
| 5 | DF | ITA | Luiz Felipe (from (France) Marseille) |
| 9 | FW | BRA | Alemão (from (Mexico) Pachuca) |
| 15 | MF | ESP | Gerard Gumbau (on loan from Granada, loan extended) |
| 21 | MF | ESP | Fran Pérez (from Valencia) |
| 32 | DF | SEN | Nobel Mendy (on loan from Real Betis) |
| 33 | DF | NED | Jozhua Vertrouwd (from Castellón) |

Out:

| No. | Pos. | Nation | Player |
|---|---|---|---|
| 5 | DF | ESP | Aridane Hernández (to Almería) |
| 9 | FW | ESP | Raúl de Tomás (on loan to (Qatar) Al-Wakrah) |
| 12 | FW | ESP | Sergi Guardiola (to Córdoba) |
| 27 | DF | ESP | Pelayo Fernández (on loan to Cádiz) |
| 28 | FW | CMR | Etienne Eto'o (on loan to Mirandés) |
| — | GK | ESP | Miguel Morro (on loan to (Portugal) Leixões, previously on loan at (Portugal) Vizela) |

=== Real Betis ===
In:

| No. | Pos. | Nation | Player |
|---|---|---|---|
| 1 | GK | ESP | Álvaro Valles (from Las Palmas) |
| 4 | DF | BRA | Natan (from (Italy) Napoli, previously on loan) |
| 7 | MF | BRA | Antony (from (England) Manchester United, previously on loan) |
| 14 | MF | MAR | Sofyan Amrabat (on loan from (Turkey) Fenerbahçe) |
| 16 | DF | ARG | Valentín Gómez (from (Argentina) Vélez Sarsfield) |
| 17 | MF | ESP | Rodrigo Riquelme (from Atlético Madrid) |
| 18 | MF | COL | Nelson Deossa (from (Mexico) Monterrey) |
| 23 | DF | DOM | Junior Firpo (from (England) Leeds United) |
| 25 | GK | ESP | Pau López (from (France) Marseille, previously on loan at (Mexico) Toluca) |
| — | FW | URU | Gonzalo Petit (from (Uruguay) Nacional) |

Out:

| No. | Pos. | Nation | Player |
|---|---|---|---|
| 1 | GK | ESP | Fran Vieites (to (England) Leicester City) |
| 4 | MF | USA | Johnny Cardoso (to Atlético Madrid) |
| 14 | MF | POR | William Carvalho (released) |
| 15 | DF | FRA | Romain Perraud (to (France) Lille) |
| 23 | DF | SEN | Youssouf Sabaly (to (Qatar) Al-Duhail) |
| 32 | DF | SEN | Nobel Mendy (on loan to Rayo Vallecano) |
| 36 | FW | ESP | Jesús Rodríguez (to (Italy) Como) |
| 57 | DF | ESP | Sergio Arribas (on loan to Huesca) |
| — | DF | ESP | Ricardo Visus (to (Poland) Widzew Łódź, previously on loan at (Netherlands) Almere City) |
| — | MF | ESP | Ismael Barea (on loan to Mirandés) |
| — | MF | ESP | Álex Collado (to (Qatar) Al-Shamal, previously on loan at (Saudi Arabia) Al-Kholood) |
| — | MF | ESP | Iker Losada (on loan from Real Betis, previously on loan at Celta Vigo) |
| — | FW | ESP | Juanmi (to Getafe, previously on loan) |
| — | FW | ESP | Borja Iglesias (to Celta Vigo, previously on loan) |
| — | FW | URU | Gonzalo Petit (on loan to Mirandés) |

=== Real Madrid ===
In:

| No. | Pos. | Nation | Player |
|---|---|---|---|
| 12 | DF | ENG | Trent Alexander-Arnold (from (England) Liverpool) |
| 18 | DF | ESP | Álvaro Carreras (from (Portugal) Benfica) |
| 24 | DF | ESP | Dean Huijsen (from (England) Bournemouth) |
| 30 | MF | ARG | Franco Mastantuono (from (Argentina) River Plate) |

Out:

| No. | Pos. | Nation | Player |
|---|---|---|---|
| 10 | MF | CRO | Luka Modrić (to (Italy) Milan) |
| 17 | DF | ESP | Lucas Vázquez (released) |
| 18 | DF | ESP | Jesús Vallejo (to Albacete) |
| 39 | DF | ESP | Lorenzo Aguado (to Albacete) |
| 44 | FW | ESP | Víctor Muñoz (to Osasuna) |
| — | DF | ESP | Rafa Obrador (to (Portugal) Benfica, previously on loan at Deportivo La Coruña) |
| — | MF | ESP | Mario Martín (on loan to Getafe, previously on loan at Valladolid) |
| — | FW | BRA | Reinier Jesus (to (Brazil) Atlético Mineiro, previously on loan at Granada) |
| — | FW | URU | Álvaro Rodríguez (to Elche, previously on loan at Getafe) |

=== Real Oviedo ===
In:

| No. | Pos. | Nation | Player |
|---|---|---|---|
| 1 | GK | ROU | Horațiu Moldovan (on loan from Atlético Madrid, previously on loan at (Italy) Sassuolo) |
| 2 | DF | CIV | Eric Bailly (from Villarreal) |
| 5 | MF | ESP | Alberto Reina (from Mirandés) |
| 7 | MF | MAR | Ilyas Chaira (from Girona, previously on loan) |
| 14 | MF | ENG | Ovie Ejaria (Free Agent) |
| 16 | DF | ANG | David Carmo (on loan from (England) Nottingham Forest) |
| 17 | MF | FRA | Brandon Domingues (from (Hungary) Debrecen) |
| 18 | MF | CRO | Josip Brekalo (from (Italy) Fiorentina, previously on loan at (Turkey) Kasımpaşa) |
| 19 | FW | ESP | Álex Forés (on loan from Villarreal, previously on loan at Levante) |
| 20 | MF | BEL | Leander Dendoncker (from (England) Aston Villa) |
| 21 | MF | SRB | Luka Ilić (from (Serbia) Red Star Belgrade) |
| 23 | FW | VEN | Salomón Rondón (on loan from (Mexico) Pachuca) |
| 25 | DF | ESP | Javi López (on loan from Real Sociedad) |

Out:

| No. | Pos. | Nation | Player |
|---|---|---|---|
| 1 | GK | FRA | Quentin Braat (to (France) Rodez) |
| 7 | MF | ESP | Sebas Moyano (to Zaragoza) |
| 9 | FW | BRA | Alemão (to (Mexico) Pachuca) |
| 10 | MF | ESP | Francisco Portillo (to Huesca) |
| 11 | MF | ARG | Santiago Colombatto (released) |
| 14 | FW | ROU | Daniel Paraschiv (on loan to Cultural Leonesa) |
| 16 | MF | ESP | Borja Sánchez (released, previously on loan at Burgos) |
| 17 | MF | ESP | César de la Hoz (released) |
| 18 | MF | ESP | Paulino (to Zaragoza) |
| 19 | FW | URU | Federico Viñas (loan return to (Mexico) León) |
| 20 | MF | ESP | Jaime Seoane (released) |
| 21 | DF | ESP | Carlos Pomares (to Zaragoza) |
| 27 | MF | ESP | Álex Cardero (on loan to Mirandés) |
| 31 | DF | NGR | Chukwuma Eze (on loan to Avilés Industrial) |
| — | MF | ESP | Alberto del Moral (on loan to Córdoba, loan extended) |
| — | MF | ESP | Yayo (to Cultural Leonesa, previously on loan at Lugo) |

=== Real Sociedad ===
In:

| No. | Pos. | Nation | Player |
|---|---|---|---|
| 11 | FW | POR | Gonçalo Guedes (from (England) Wolverhampton Wanderers) |
| 12 | MF | VEN | Yangel Herrera (from Girona) |
| 16 | DF | CRO | Duje Ćaleta-Car (on loan from (France) Lyon) |
| 19 | FW | ESP | Jon Karrikaburu (loan return from Racing Santander) |

Out:

| No. | Pos. | Nation | Player |
|---|---|---|---|
| 4 | MF | ESP | Martín Zubimendi (to (England) Arsenal) |
| 11 | FW | SUR | Sheraldo Becker (to Osasuna) |
| 12 | DF | ESP | Javi López (on loan to Real Oviedo) |
| 16 | MF | ESP | Jon Ander Olasagasti (to Levante) |
| 18 | DF | MLI | Hamari Traoré (to (France) Paris FC) |
| 20 | DF | ESP | Jon Pacheco (on loan to Alavés) |
| — | MF | ESP | Urko González de Zárate (to Espanyol, previously on loan) |
| — | MF | ESP | Jon Magunazelaia (to Eibar, previously on loan at Córdoba) |
| — | FW | ESP | Carlos Fernández (on loan to Mirandés, previously on loan at Cádiz) |

=== Sevilla ===
In:

| No. | Pos. | Nation | Player |
|---|---|---|---|
| 1 | GK | GRE | Odysseas Vlachodimos (on loan from (England) Newcastle United) |
| 3 | DF | ESP | César Azpilicueta (from Atlético Madrid) |
| 8 | MF | ESP | Joan Jordán (loan return from Alavés) |
| 10 | FW | CHI | Alexis Sánchez (from (Italy) Udinese) |
| 12 | DF | CHI | Gabriel Suazo (from (France) Toulouse) |
| 15 | DF | POR | Fábio Cardoso (from (Portugal) Porto, previously on loan at (United Arab Emirates) Al Ain) |
| 17 | MF | ESP | Alfon (from Celta Vigo) |
| 19 | MF | FRA | Batista Mendy (on loan from (Turkey) Trabzonspor) |

Out:

| No. | Pos. | Nation | Player |
|---|---|---|---|
| 3 | DF | ESP | Adrià Pedrosa (on loan to Elche) |
| 10 | MF | ESP | Suso (to Cádiz) |
| 11 | MF | BEL | Dodi Lukébakio (to (Portugal) Benfica) |
| 12 | MF | BEL | Albert Sambi Lokonga (loan return to (England) Arsenal) |
| 17 | MF | ESP | Saúl (loan return to Atlético Madrid, later to (Brazil) Flamengo) |
| 22 | DF | FRA | Loïc Badé (to (Germany) Bayer Leverkusen) |
| 27 | MF | BEL | Stanis Idumbo (to (France) Monaco) |
| 34 | MF | COL | Mateo Mejía (to Burgos) |
| 38 | DF | ESP | Diego Hormigo (to Granada) |
| 42 | FW | ESP | Álvaro García Pascual (to Cádiz) |
| — | FW | NGR | Kelechi Iheanacho (to (Scotland) Celtic, previously on loan at (England) Middlesbrough) |
| — | FW | ESP | Rafa Mir (on loan to Elche, previously on loan at Valencia) |

=== Valencia ===
In:

| No. | Pos. | Nation | Player |
|---|---|---|---|
| 3 | DF | ESP | José Manuel Copete (from Mallorca) |
| 7 | FW | NED | Arnaut Danjuma (from Villarreal, previously on loan at Girona) |
| 13 | GK | ESP | Cristian Rivero (loan return from Albacete) |
| 15 | FW | ARG | Lucas Beltrán (on loan from (Italy) Fiorentina) |
| 17 | MF | BEL | Largie Ramazani (on loan from (England) Leeds United) |
| 19 | MF | ESP | Dani Raba (from Leganés) |
| 22 | MF | FRA | Baptiste Santamaria (from (France) Rennes, previously on loan at (France) Nice) |
| 23 | MF | SUI | Filip Ugrinić (from (Switzerland) Young Boys) |
| 25 | GK | ESP | Julen Agirrezabala (on loan from Athletic Bilbao) |

Out:

| No. | Pos. | Nation | Player |
|---|---|---|---|
| 3 | DF | ESP | Cristhian Mosquera (to (England) Arsenal) |
| 6 | MF | ESP | Hugo Guillamón (to (Croatia) Hajduk Split) |
| 7 | MF | ESP | Sergi Canós (on loan to Valladolid) |
| 11 | FW | ESP | Rafa Mir (loan return to Sevilla, later loaned to Elche) |
| 23 | MF | ESP | Fran Pérez (to Rayo Vallecano) |
| 24 | DF | ESP | Yarek Gasiorowski (to (Netherlands) PSV) |
| 25 | GK | GEO | Giorgi Mamardashvili (to (England) Liverpool) |
| 33 | MF | ESP | Pablo López (on loan to Mirandés) |
| 38 | DF | ESP | Iker Córdoba (on loan to Mirandés) |
| 39 | DF | ESP | Ro Abajas (to Huesca) |
| — | DF | TUR | Cenk Özkacar (on loan to (Germany) 1. FC Köln, previously on loan at Valladolid) |
| — | MF | ESP | Germán Valera (to Elche, previously on loan) |
| — | FW | ESP | Alberto Marí (on loan to Mirandés, previously on loan at Zaragoza) |

=== Villarreal ===
In:

| No. | Pos. | Nation | Player |
|---|---|---|---|
| 4 | DF | ESP | Rafa Marín (on loan from (Italy) Napoli) |
| 6 | MF | ISR | Manor Solomon (on loan from (England) Tottenham Hotspur, previously on loan at (England) Leeds United) |
| 9 | FW | GEO | Georges Mikautadze (from (France) Lyon) |
| 12 | DF | POR | Renato Veiga (from (England) Chelsea, previously on loan at (Italy) Juventus) |
| 15 | DF | URU | Santiago Mouriño (from Atlético Madrid) |
| 16 | MF | GHA | Thomas Partey (from (England) Arsenal) |
| 17 | FW | CAN | Tajon Buchanan (from (Italy) Inter, previously on loan) |
| 20 | MF | ESP | Alberto Moleiro (from Las Palmas) |
| 21 | FW | CAN | Tani Oluwaseyi (from (United States) Minnesota United) |
| 25 | GK | ESP | Arnau Tenas (from (France) Paris Saint-Germain) |
| 33 | FW | ESP | Pau Cabanes (loan return from Alavés) |

Out:

| No. | Pos. | Nation | Player |
|---|---|---|---|
| 4 | DF | CIV | Eric Bailly (to Real Oviedo) |
| 6 | MF | ESP | Denis Suárez (to Alavés) |
| 15 | FW | FRA | Thierno Barry (to (England) Everton) |
| 16 | MF | ESP | Álex Baena (to Atlético Madrid) |
| 17 | DF | ESP | Kiko Femenía (to Getafe) |
| 21 | MF | ESP | Yéremy Pino (to (England) Crystal Palace) |
| 27 | DF | ESP | Arnau Solà (loan return to Almería, later sold to (Portugal) Arouca) |
| 29 | FW | CMR | Karl Etta Eyong (to Levante) |
| 30 | MF | ESP | Dani Requena (on loan to Córdoba) |
| 38 | MF | ARG | Thiago Ojeda (on loan to Cultural Leonesa) |
| — | DF | ESP | Carlos Romero (on loan to Espanyol, loan extended) |
| — | MF | ESP | Carlo Adriano (to (Mexico) Querétaro, previously on loan at Mirandés) |
| — | MF | ESP | Ramon Terrats (on loan to Espanyol, previously on loan at Getafe) |
| — | FW | NED | Arnaut Danjuma (to Valencia, previously on loan at Girona) |
| — | FW | ESP | Álex Forés (on loan to Real Oviedo, previously on loan at Levante) |
| — | FW | ESP | Jorge Pascual (to Granada, previously on loan at Eibar) |

== See also ==
- 2025–26 La Liga
- 2025–26 Segunda División
  - List of Segunda División football transfers summer 2025
