= Isaac Obeng =

Ghanaian footballer

Personal information
- Full name: Isaac Korankye Obeng
- Date of birth: 10 May 2003 (age 23)
- Place of birth: Obuasi, Ghana
- Height: 1.81 m (5 ft 11 in)
- Position: Winger

Team information
- Current team: Hércules

Youth career
- Murcia
- 2018–2021: Elche
- 2021–2022: Espanyol

Senior career*
Years	Team	Apps	(Gls)
2022–2023	Espanyol B	0	(0)
2022–2023	→ Unionistas (loan)	8	(0)
2019–2020	Logroñés B	8	(1)
2020–2023	Logroñés	1	(0)
2023–2025	Racing B	48	(1)
2025	Teruel	14	(3)
2025–2026	Cádiz	2	(0)
2025–2026	→ Algeciras (loan)	37	(3)
2026–	Hércules	0	(0)
- * Club domestic league appearances and goals as of 10 June 2026

Isaac Korankye Obeng (born 10 May 2003) is a Ghanaian professional footballer who plays as a winger for Spanish club Hércules CF.

== Career ==
Born in Obuasi, Obeng played for the youth sides of Real Murcia CF and Elche CF before joining RCD Espanyol on 18 August 2021, initially for the Juvenil squad. On 18 July of the following year, after finishing his formation, he was loaned to Primera Federación side Unionistas de Salamanca CF, for one year.

Obeng made his senior debut on 4 September 2022, coming on as a late substitute in a 1–1 home draw against Linares Deportivo. The following 13 January, his loan was cut short and he signed for UD Logroñés, being initially assigned to the reserves in Segunda Federación.

On 2 September 2023, Obeng moved to another reserve team, Rayo Cantabria also in division four. On 28 January 2025, he agreed to a deal with fellow league team CD Teruel.

On 19 June 2025, after helping Teruel to achieve promotion, Obeng signed a three-year contract with Segunda División side Cádiz CF. He made his professional debut on 17 August, coming on as a late substitute for José Antonio de la Rosa in a 1–0 home win over CD Mirandés.

On 1 September 2025, however, Obeng was loaned to Primera Federación side Algeciras CF for one year. The following 30 June, he moved to fellow league team Hércules CF on a permanent deal.
