= Álex Mohamed =

Spanish footballer

Personal information
- Full name: Al-Lal Mohamed Amar
- Date of birth: 25 December 1957 (age 68)
- Place of birth: Melilla, Spain
- Height: 1.80 m (5 ft 11 in)
- Position: Defender

Youth career
- Betis

Senior career*
Years	Team	Apps	(Gls)
1976–1979	Betis B		
1979–1987	Betis	206	(3)
1978–1979	→ Xerez (loan)	30	(3)
1987–1988	Recreativo	32	(3)
1988–1991	Xerez	77	(3)
1991–1992	Poli Ejido	33	(2)
1992–1993	San Juan		
Total		348	(10)

International career
1975	Spain U18	1	(0)
- * Club domestic league appearances and goals

Al-Lal "Alex" Mohamed Amar (born 25 December 1957) is a Spanish retired footballer who played as a right back or a central defender.

== Club career ==
Born in Melilla, Álex played his entire career in Andalusia, successively representing Real Betis, Xerez CD (two spells), Recreativo de Huelva and Polideportivo Ejido and amassing La Liga totals of 206 matches and two goals over eight seasons, all with the first club. On 1 April 1984, in a 1–0 win against RCD Mallorca at Barcelona's Mini Estadi, he scored their 1.000th goal at the Spanish top level.

In the summer of 1991, after Xerez's relegation from Segunda División, Álex retired professionally from the game at the age of 33. Subsequently, he worked with Betis in directorial capacities.
