= Ro Abajas =

Spanish footballer (born 2003)

Personal information
- Full name: Rodrigo Abajas Martín
- Date of birth: 12 May 2003 (age 23)
- Place of birth: Madrid, Spain
- Height: 1.86 m (6 ft 1 in)
- Position: Left-back

Youth career
- 2012–2013: Sporting Hortaleza
- 2013–2014: Canillas
- 2014–2015: Getafe
- 2015–2017: Real Madrid
- 2017–2022: Leganés

Senior career*
Years	Team	Apps	(Gls)
2021–2024	Leganés B	26	(0)
2023–2024	→ Rayo Majadahonda (loan)	26	(2)
2024–2025	Valencia B	23	(0)
2024–2025	Valencia	1	(0)
2025–2026	Huesca	21	(0)
- * Club domestic league appearances and goals as of 9 June 2026

Rodrigo "Ro" Abajas Martín (born 12 May 2003) is a Spanish professional footballer who plays as a left-back.

== Career ==
Born in Madrid, Abajas represented AD Sporting Hortaleza, CD Canillas, Getafe CF and Real Madrid CF before joining CD Leganés' youth sides in 2017. He made his senior debut with the reserves on 23 October 2021, coming on as a half-time substitute in a 1–0 Segunda División RFEF away loss to CD Arenteiro.

On 5 August 2023, Abajas was loaned to Primera Federación side CF Rayo Majadahonda for the season. He scored his first senior goal on 14 October, netting Rayo's third in a 3–1 home win over CE Sabadell FC.

On 19 July 2024, Abajas moved to another reserve team, Valencia CF Mestalla in the fourth division. He made his first team debut on 21 October, starting in a 3–2 home loss to UD Las Palmas.

On 1 July 2025, Abajas signed a three-year contract with SD Huesca in Segunda División.

== Personal life ==
Abajas' twin brother Alvin is also a footballer. A goalkeeper, he too was groomed at Leganés.
