= Efe Aghama =

Nigerian footballer

Personal information
- Full name: Efe Aghama Ugiagbe
- Date of birth: 11 June 2004 (age 22)
- Place of birth: Edo State, Nigeria
- Height: 1.78 m (5 ft 10 in)
- Position: Winger

Team information
- Current team: Cádiz

Youth career
- Bendel Insurance

Senior career*
Years	Team	Apps	(Gls)
2021–2023	Bendel Insurance		
2023–2024	Mačva Šabac	8	(1)
2025	Lleida	11	(1)
2025	Ceuta	3	(0)
2025–	Cádiz	11	(1)
2026	→ Huesca (loan)	6	(0)
- * Club domestic league appearances and goals as of 9 June 2026

Efe Aghama Ugiagbe (born 11 June 2004) is a Nigerian professional footballer who plays for Spanish club Cádiz CF. Mainly a left winger, he can also play as an attacking midfielder.

== Career ==
A Bendel Insurance youth graduate, Aghama was promoted to the first team in January 2021, but only made his senior debut in May 2022. In September 2023, he moved to Serbian First League side Mačva Šabac on a three-year deal.

Aghama made his professional debut on 22 September 2023, starting in a 0–0 home draw against Sloboda Užice, and scored his first goal eight days later in a 1–0 home win over Jedinstvo Ub. He featured in eight matches for the side before leaving.

In July 2024, Aghama started training with Segunda Federación side Lleida CF, while waiting for a registration. Bureaucratic issues prevented his registration until the following 14 January, when he officially signed a six-month contract with the club.

On 16 July 2025, Aghama signed for AD Ceuta FC, being initially assigned with the reserves in Tercera Federación. He made his first team debut on 15 August, coming on as a second-half substitute for Kialy Abdoul Kone in a 3–0 Segunda División away loss to Real Valladolid.

On 1 September 2025, Aghama signed a five-year contract with fellow second division side Cádiz CF, after the club activated his buyout clause. He scored his first professional goal on 23 November, in a 2–1 home loss against Cultural y Deportiva Leonesa.

On 7 January 2026, Aghama was loaned to fellow second division side SD Huesca until the end of the season.
