= Adam Arvelo =

Spanish footballer

Personal information
- Full name: José Adam Arvelo López
- Date of birth: 31 May 2005 (age 21)
- Place of birth: Candelaria, Spain
- Height: 1.76 m (5 ft 9 in)
- Position: Winger

Team information
- Current team: Las Palmas

Youth career
- 2014–2015: Candelaria
- 2015–2017: Tenerife
- 2017–2019: Villarreal
- 2019–2020: Roda
- 2020–2022: Real Madrid

Senior career*
Years	Team	Apps	(Gls)
2022–2025	Sporting CP B	2	(0)
2025–	Las Palmas	1	(0)
2026	→ Unionistas (loan)	4	(0)

International career
2019–2020	Spain U15	5	(0)
2021	Spain U17	2	(0)
- * Club domestic league appearances and goals as of 9 June 2026

José Adam Arvelo López (born 31 May 2005) is a Spanish professional footballer who plays as a winger for UD Las Palmas.

== Club career ==
=== Early career ===
Born in Candelaria, Tenerife, Canary Islands, Arvelo began his career with local side EMF Candelaria, and subsequently represented CD Tenerife before joining the youth sides of Villarreal CF in 2017. On 15 September 2020, he moved to Real Madrid, after the club beat off competition from FC Barcelona and other Premier League clubs.

=== Sporting CP ===
On 22 August 2022, Arvelo moved abroad for the first time in his career, signing a three-year contract with Portuguese side Sporting CP. Initially a member of the under-23 team, he only made his senior debut with the reserves on 22 February 2025, starting in a 3–1 Liga 3 home loss to CF Os Belenenses.

After failing to make a breakthrough in the first team, Arvelo departed the club on 28 May 2025.

=== Las Palmas ===
On 16 June 2025, after being close to a move back to his former side Tenerife, Arvelo agreed to a two-year deal with UD Las Palmas, recently relegated to Segunda División. He made his professional debut on 20 December, coming on as a late substitute in a 4–0 home routing of Cultural y Deportiva Leonesa.

On 12 January 2026, Arvelo was loaned to Primera Federación side Unionistas de Salamanca CF until June.

== International career ==
Arvelo represented Spain at under-15 and under-17 levels.
