= UD Logroñés =

Association football club in Spain

- Full name: Unión Deportiva Logroñés, S.A.D.
- Nicknames: Logroñés; UDL; Unión Deportiva
- Founded: 2009; 17 years ago
- Ground: Estadio Las Gaunas, Logroño, La Rioja, Spain
- Capacity: 15,902
- Owner: Félix Revuelta
- President: Félix Revuelta
- Head coach: Unai Mendia
- League: Primera Federación – Group 1
- 2025–26: Segunda Federación – Group 2, 3rd of 18 (promoted via play-offs)
- Website: udlogrones.com
Home colours	Away colours

Unión Deportiva Logroñés, S.A.D. is a Spanish football team based in Logroño, in the autonomous community of La Rioja. Founded in 2009, it currently plays in Primera Federación – Group 1, holding home matches at Estadio Las Gaunas, with a capacity of 16,000 seats.

== History ==
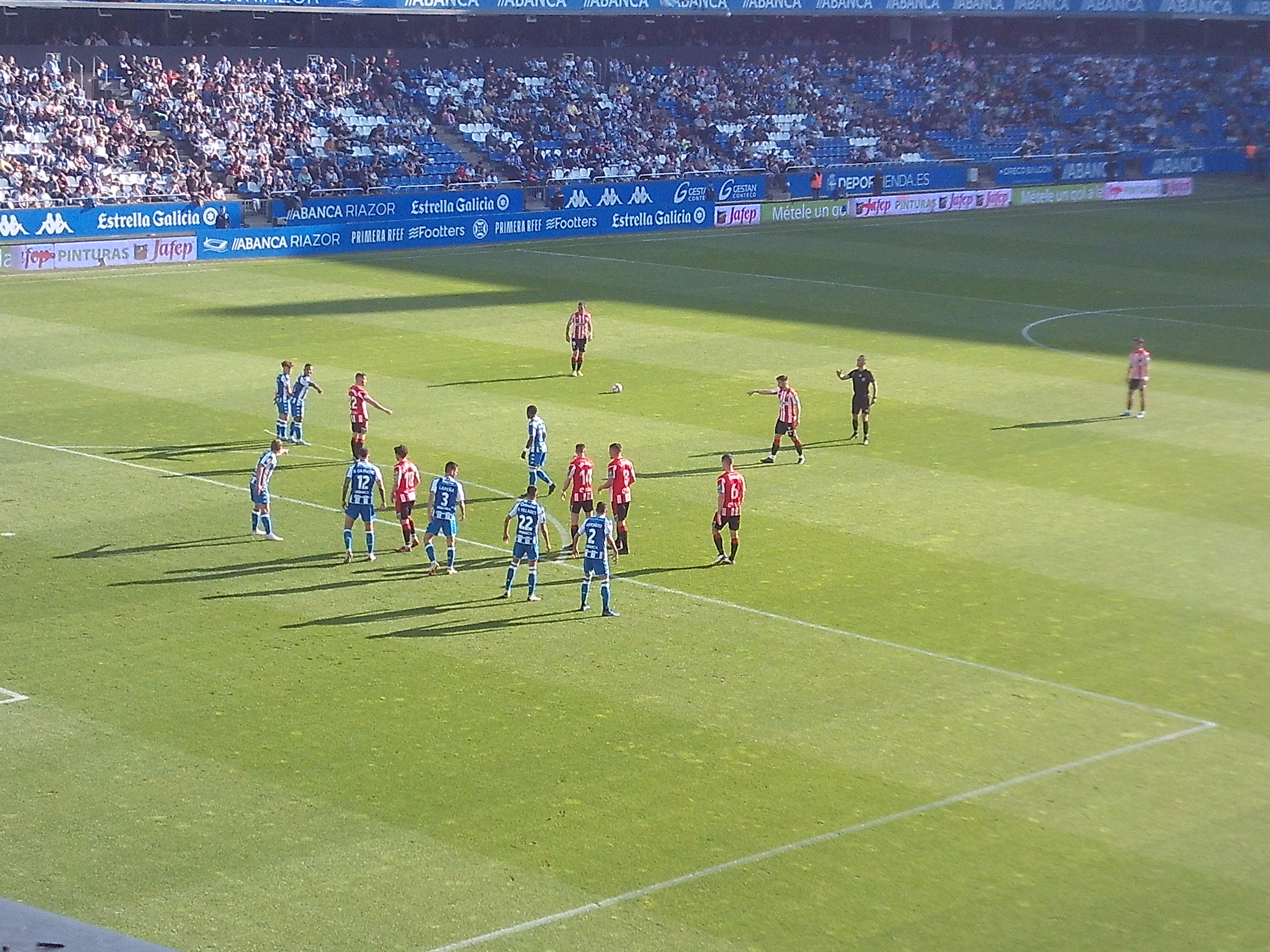
Deportivo de La Coruña vs UD Logroñés

Unión Deportiva Logroñés was founded in 2009 after the extinction of CD Logroñés, occupying the seat of CD Varea, recently promoted to Segunda División B. They comfortably maintained their place in the division in their first season, (2009–10), and their reserve team, UD Logroñés B, finished in third position in the regional championship, thus promoting to Tercera División. UD Logroñés reached 5th place in the 2011–12 season.

In 2016 the club made a 3-year collaboration agreement with SD Eibar, whose fringe players would go on loan to Logroñés for experience with the hosting club hoping to achieving promotion due to the additional talent in the squad; one of the first to make the move was goalkeeper Jon Ander. In Segunda División B, UD Logroñés finished 6th in the 2016–17 season. In the next season, the club finished 7th in Group 2, and in the 2018–19 season they finished as runners-up of their group.

The 2019–20 season was curtailed, due to the COVID-19 pandemic in Spain, when the team was leading Group 2. On 18 July 2020, the season recommenced with the promotion playoffs to Segunda División, and UD Logroñés achieved promotion after beating Castellón in a penalty shootout.

== Season to season ==
Season	Tier	Division	Place	Copa del Rey
2009–10	3	2ª B	9th	
2010–11	3	2ª B	6th	
2011–12	3	2ª B	5th	Third round
2012–13	3	2ª B	14th	First round
2013–14	3	2ª B	11th	
2014–15	3	2ª B	4th	
2015–16	3	2ª B	4th	Round of 32
2016–17	3	2ª B	6th	First round
2017–18	3	2ª B	7th	Third round
2018–19	3	2ª B	2nd	Third round
2019–20	3	2ª B	1st	Round of 32
2020–21	2	2ª	20th	First round
2021–22	3	1ª RFEF	5th	First round
2022–23	3	1ª Fed.	18th	Round of 32
2023–24	4	2ª Fed.	3rd	First round
2024–25	4	2ª Fed.	6th	Round of 32
2025–26	4	2ª Fed.	3rd	First round
2026–27	3	1ª Fed.		TBD

- 1 season in Segunda División
- 3 seasons in Primera Federación/Primera División RFEF
- 11 seasons in Segunda División B
- 3 seasons in Segunda Federación

== Current squad ==
As of 4 November 2026.

Note: Flags indicate national team as defined under FIFA eligibility rules; some limited exceptions apply. Players may hold more than one non-FIFA nationality.

No.	Pos.	Nation	Player
1	GK	ESP	Taliby Konaté
2	DF	ESP	José Val
3	DF	ESP	Sergio Camacho
4	DF	ESP	Eduardo Cabetas
5	DF	ESP	Adrián Bolo
6	MF	ESP	Mario Maroto
7	FW	ESP	David Amigo
8	MF	ESP	Miguel Marí
9	FW	AND	Berto Rosas (on loan from Andorra)
10	MF	ESP	Quique Rivero
11	FW	ESP	Marcos Baselga
12	MF	ESP	Miguel Barandalla

No.	Pos.	Nation	Player
13	GK	ESP	Fermín Sobrón
14	DF	ESP	David Navarro
15	DF	ESP	Manuel Pedreño
16	MF	ESP	Mikel Zabala
17	MF	CIV	Latif Issman
18	FW	SEN	Papa Dame Ba (on loan from Girona)
19	MF	ESP	Ibai Asenjo (on loan from Eibar)
20	FW	ESP	Anai Morales (on loan from Osasuna)
21	FW	ESP	Ismael Santana
22	DF	ESP	Carlos García-Die
23	MF	ESP	Miguelete (on loan from Sabadell)
—	DF	ESP	Jaime Vallejo

=== Reserve team ===
Note: Flags indicate national team as defined under FIFA eligibility rules; some limited exceptions apply. Players may hold more than one non-FIFA nationality.

No.	Pos.	Nation	Player
26	DF	ESP	Eder Larrea
27	FW	ESP	Prince Chinedu

No.	Pos.	Nation	Player
29	DF	ESP	Adei Mendinueta
30	GK	ESP	Eric Gamen

== Stadium ==
Logroñés plays home games at Estadio Las Gaunas. It has a capacity of 16,000 spectators, and its pitch measures 104 x 66 meters.

== See also ==
- UD Logroñés B, reserve team
