= Arnau Rafús =

Spanish footballer (born 2003)

Personal information
- Full name: Arnau Rafús Aulet
- Date of birth: 27 April 2003 (age 23)
- Place of birth: Vic, Spain
- Height: 1.90 m (6 ft 3 in)
- Position: Goalkeeper

Youth career
- Vic Riuprimer
- 2016–2023: Barcelona

Senior career*
| Years | Team | Apps | (Gls) |
| 2023 | Barcelona B | 3 | (0) |
| 2023–2025 | Valladolid B | 28 | (0) |
| 2025 | Valladolid | 1 | (0) |
| 2025–2026 | Cultural Leonesa | 0 | (0) |
- * Club domestic league appearances and goals as of 27 April 2025

Arnau Rafús Aulet (born 27 April 2003) is a Spanish professional footballer who plays as a goalkeeper.

== Career ==
=== Barcelona ===
Born in Vic, Barcelona, Catalonia, Rafús joined FC Barcelona's La Masia in 2016, from Vic Riuprimer REFO FC. In January 2023, after recovering from a knee injury and the promotion of Iñaki Peña to the first team, he was registered in the reserves with the number 24 jersey.

Rafús made his senior debut with Barça Atlètic on 15 January 2023, starting in a 2–1 Primera Federación home win over CF La Nucía. He featured in two further matches for the side before suffering an adductor injury in March.

=== Valladolid ===
On 21 July 2023, Rafús signed a two-year deal with Real Valladolid, being initially assigned to the B-team in Segunda Federación. After becoming a regular starter with the B's in the 2023–24 campaign, he made his first team – and La Liga – debut on 29 March 2025, starting in a 2–1 away loss to Real Sociedad as starter Karl Hein was out injured.

=== Cultural Leonesa ===
On 7 July 2025, Segunda División side Cultural y Deportiva Leonesa announced the signing of Rafús on a one-year deal.
