= Luis López (footballer, born 2001) =

Spanish footballer (born 2001)

Personal information
- Full name: Luis Federico López Andúgar
- Date of birth: 8 May 2001 (age 25)
- Place of birth: Murcia, Spain
- Height: 1.97 m (6 ft 6 in)
- Position: Goalkeeper

Team information
- Current team: Eibar
- Number: 1

Youth career
- 2005–2012: Barnés
- 2012–2015: Murcia
- 2015–2020: Real Madrid

Senior career*
| Years | Team | Apps | (Gls) |
| 2020–2023 | Real Madrid B | 23 | (0) |
| 2023–2025 | Mirandés | 7 | (0) |
| 2025– | Eibar | 0 | (0) |

International career^{‡}
| 2018–2019 | Spain U18 | 3 | (0) |
- * Club domestic league appearances and goals as of 8 June 2024 ‡ National team caps and goals as of 2 June 2022

Luis Federico López Andúgar (born 8 May 2001) is a Spanish professional footballer who plays as a goalkeeper for SD Eibar.

== Club career ==
=== Real Madrid ===
Born in Murcia, López joined Real Madrid's La Fábrica in 2015, from hometown side Real Murcia. He made his senior debut with the reserves on 15 November 2020, starting in a 1–0 Segunda División B away loss against CF Rayo Majadahonda.

In 2021, after Diego Altube's departure, López became the third and fourth-choice goalkeeper at Real Madrid, behind Thibaut Courtois, Andriy Lunin and Toni Fuidias. He remained under that role in the 2022–23 season, only featuring rarely with the B-team.

=== Mirandés ===
On 25 July 2023, López signed a two-year contract with Segunda División side CD Mirandés. He made his professional debut on 14 August, starting in a 4–0 home routing of AD Alcorcón.

López was a backup option during his two-year spell at the club, first to Ramón Juan then to Raúl Fernández.

=== Eibar ===
On 26 June 2025, free agent López agreed to a two-year deal with SD Eibar also in the second division.

== Career statistics ==
=== Club ===
As of 17 June 2023

Appearances and goals by club, season and competition
| Club | Season | League | | | Other | | Total | |
| Club | Season | Division | Apps | Goals | Apps | Goals | Apps | Goals |
|---|---|---|---|---|---|---|---|---|
| Real Madrid Castilla | 2020–21 | Segunda División B | 7 | 0 | 0 | 0 | 7 | 0 |
| Real Madrid Castilla | 2021–22 | Primera División RFEF | 14 | 0 | — | | 14 | 0 |
| Real Madrid Castilla | 2022–23 | Primera Federación | 2 | 0 | 4 (Note: Appearances in 2023 Primera Federación play-offs) | 0 | 6 | 0 |
| Career total | | | 23 | 0 | 4 | 0 | 27 | 0 |

== Honours ==
Real Madrid

- FIFA Club World Cup: 2022

Real Madrid Juvenil A

- UEFA Youth League: 2019–20
