= Chukwuma Eze =

Nigerian footballer

Personal information
- Date of birth: 16 November 2003 (age 22)
- Place of birth: Lagos, Nigeria
- Height: 1.85 m (6 ft 1 in)
- Position: Centre-back

Team information
- Current team: Villarreal B (on loan from Oviedo)

Youth career
- Collis Edwin SC
- 2021–2022: Oviedo

Senior career*
Years	Team	Apps	(Gls)
2022–2025	Oviedo B	19	(1)
2022–2023	→ Llanes (loan)	20	(0)
2023–2024	→ L'Entregu (loan)	31	(3)
2025–	Oviedo	1	(0)
2025–2026	→ Avilés Industrial (loan)	18	(0)
2026–	→ Villarreal B (loan)	0	(0)
- * Club domestic league appearances and goals as of 9 June 2026

Chukwuma Eze (born 16 November 2003) is a Nigerian footballer who plays as a centre-back for Spanish club Villarreal CF B, on loan from Real Oviedo.

== Career ==
Born in Lagos, Eze joined Real Oviedo's youth categories in August 2021, from local side Collis Edwin SC. On 9 August 2022, after finishing his formation, he moved to Tercera Federación side CD Llanes on a one-year loan deal.

On 1 September 2023, Eze moved to fellow fifth division side L'Entregu CF also in a temporary deal. He returned to the Carbayones in July 2024, being assigned to the reserves in the same category, and renewed his contract until 2028 on 27 November of that year.

Eze made his first team debut with Oviedo on 26 April 2025, coming on as a second-half substitute for Dani Calvo in a 1–0 Segunda División home win over Levante UD. On 14 July, he was loaned to Primera Federación side Real Avilés Industrial CF for the season.

Upon returning, Eze renewed his link with the Carbayones until 2029 on 16 August 2026, and was loaned to Villarreal CF B also in the third division the following day.
