= Marcos Moreno =

Spanish footballer (born 2004)

Personal information
- Full name: Marcos Moreno Gómez
- Date of birth: 14 February 2004 (age 22)
- Place of birth: Albacete, Spain
- Height: 1.85 m (6 ft 1 in)
- Position: Forward

Team information
- Current team: Cartagena

Youth career
- 2015–2020: Albacete
- 2020–2021: Villarreal
- 2021–2022: Roda
- 2022–2023: Villarreal

Senior career*
| Years | Team | Apps | (Gls) |
| 2023 | Villarreal C | 2 | (0) |
| 2023–2025 | Albacete B | 63 | (39) |
| 2024–2026 | Albacete | 9 | (0) |
| 2025–2026 | → Talavera (loan) | 36 | (5) |
| 2026– | Cartagena | 0 | (0) |
- * Club domestic league appearances and goals as of 23 May 2026

Marcos Moreno Gómez (born 14 February 2004) is a Spanish footballer who plays as a forward for FC Cartagena.

== Career ==
Born in Albacete, Castilla–La Mancha, Moreno joined Albacete Balompié's youth sides in 2015, aged 11. In May 2020, he moved to Villarreal CF on a three-year contract, being initially assigned to the Juvenil B squad.

After playing for affiliate side CD Roda's Juvenil side, Moreno made his senior debut with the Yellow Submarine's C-team on 18 February 2023, coming on as a late substitute for Marcos Sánchez in a 1–0 Tercera Federación away loss to CF Gandía. On 13 July, however, he returned to Alba and was initially assigned to the reserves also in division five.

Moreno scored his first senior goal on 24 September 2023, netting Atlético Albacete's opener in a 1–1 draw at CP Villarrobledo. He finished the season with 19 goals for the B's, scoring braces against UB Conquense, CD Villacañas and CD Torrijos.

Moreno made his first team debut with Albacete on 21 October 2024, replacing Juanma late into a 2–0 home win over Burgos CF. The following 4 July, he renewed his contract with the club until 2027, but was loaned to Primera Federación side CF Talavera de la Reina on 1 August.

On 12 August 2026, Moreno signed a two-year deal with FC Cartagena also in division three.
