= Pablo López (footballer, born 2006) =

Spanish association football player (born 2006)

Personal information
- Full name: Pablo López Gómez
- Date of birth: 27 March 2006 (age 20)
- Place of birth: La Manga, Spain
- Height: 1.75 m (5 ft 9 in)
- Position: Winger

Team information
- Current team: Valencia B

Youth career
- La Manga
- Levante
- 2020–2021: Patacona
- 2021–2022: Levante
- 2022–2024: Valencia

Senior career*
Years	Team	Apps	(Gls)
2024–	Valencia B	23	(3)
2025–	Valencia	0	(0)
2025–2026	→ Mirandés (loan)	4	(1)

International career
2023	Spain U16	5	(2)
2022–2023	Spain U17	8	(0)
2023–2024	Spain U18	5	(0)
2024–	Spain U19	5	(0)
- * Club domestic league appearances and goals as of 29 November 2025

Pablo López Gómez (born 27 March 2006) is a Spanish professional footballer who plays mainly as a left winger for Valencia CF Mestalla.

== Early life ==
He is from La Manga in the Region of Murcia. He played as a youngster for CD La Manga and Patacona CF before joining the academy at Levante UD.

== Club career ==
Gómez joined the youth academy at Valencia CF from Levante in June 2022. He joined up with Valencia CF Mestalla in the Segunda Federación for the 2024-25 season.

López made his first team debut for the Che on 14 January 2025, coming on as a late substitute for Sadiq Umar in a 1–0 away win over Ourense CF, for the season's Copa del Rey. On 1 September, he was loaned to Segunda División side CD Mirandés, for one year.

López made his professional debut on 5 September 2025, replacing Iker Varela late into a 4–1 away routing of Albacete Balompié, and also scoring his side's fourth goal. In October, after just three further matches, he suffered an anterior cruciate ligament injury, being sidelined for the remainder of the campaign.

== International career ==
He is a Spanish youth international. He played for Spain U17 at the 2023 FIFA U-17 World Cup. The following year he was called-up to the Spain U18 squad.
