= Mariano Carmona =

Spanish footballer

Personal information
- Full name: Mariano Emilio Carmona Cerezo
- Date of birth: 20 June 2001 (age 25)
- Place of birth: Murcia, Spain
- Height: 1.85 m (6 ft 1 in)
- Positions: Winger; forward

Team information
- Current team: Eldense (on loan from Córdoba)
- Number: 9

Youth career
- 2005–2018: Plus Ultra
- 2018–2019: Beniaján
- 2019–2020: Lorquí

Senior career*
Years	Team	Apps	(Gls)
2020–2021	Plus Ultra	26	(7)
2021–2022	UCAM Murcia B	27	(5)
2022–2023	El Palmar	27	(2)
2023–2024	Murcia B	19	(9)
2023–2024	Murcia	7	(0)
2024–2025	Coria	29	(13)
2025–	Córdoba	0	(0)
2025–2026	→ Alcorcón (loan)	31	(6)
2026–	→ Eldense (loan)	2	(1)
- * Club domestic league appearances and goals as of 22 August 2026

Mariano Emilio Carmona Cerezo (born 20 June 2001) is a Spanish professional footballer who plays as either a right winger or a forward for CD Eldense, on loan from Córdoba CF.

== Club career ==
Born in Llano de Brujas, Murcia, Carmona represented CD Plus Ultra, Beniaján CF and ADM Lorquí as a youth, before returning to the former on 24 July 2020, now for the first team in Tercera División. On 3 March of the following year, he agreed to a deal with UCAM Murcia CF, effective as of 1 July, and was assigned to the reserves in Tercera División RFEF.

In September 2022, Carmona left UCAM and signed for El Palmar CF also in the fifth tier. On 31 July of the following year, he moved to Real Murcia CF; initially a member of the B-team in the same division.

On 4 August 2024, after featuring in seven first team matches for Murcia in Primera Federación, Carmona was announced at Segunda Federación side CD Coria. The following 30 April, after becoming the club's top scorer with 13 goals, he agreed to a pre-contract with Córdoba CF; the deal was officially announced on 14 June 2025.

On 30 July 2025, however, Carmona was loaned to AD Alcorcón in the third division, for one year. On 8 July of the following year, he renewed his contract with the Blanquiverdes until 2029, and was immediately loaned to fellow division two side CD Eldense for the season.

Carmona made his professional debut on 17 August 2026, starting in a 3–0 away loss to UD Almería. He scored his first goal in the second division five days later, netting the opener in a 2–2 home draw against Cádiz CF.
