= Diego Hormigo =

Spanish footballer (born 2003)

Personal information
- Full name: Diego Hormigo Iturralde
- Date of birth: 16 April 2003 (age 23)
- Place of birth: Seville, Spain
- Height: 1.82 m (6 ft 0 in)
- Position: Left back

Team information
- Current team: Granada
- Number: 3

Youth career
- Sevilla

Senior career*
Years	Team	Apps	(Gls)
2022	Sevilla C	8	(0)
2022–2025	Sevilla B	78	(5)
2023–2025	Sevilla	3	(0)
2025–	Granada	21	(0)
- * Club domestic league appearances and goals as of 9 June 2026

Diego Hormigo Iturralde (born 16 April 2003) is a Spanish professional footballer who plays as a left back for Granada CF.

== Career ==
Born in Seville, Andalusia, Hormigo was a Sevilla FC youth graduate. He made his senior debut with the C-team on 9 January 2022, coming on as a second-half substitute in a 3–0 Tercera División RFEF away loss against CD Cabecense.

Hormigo renewed with the Nervionenses on 1 July 2022, signing a new contract until 2025. After starting the 2022–23 season as a full member of the C-team, he also started to feature regularly with the reserves in Segunda Federación. He scored his first senior goal on 10 December, netting the opener for the B's in a 2–1 home loss against Xerez Deportivo FC.

Hormigo made his first team – and La Liga – debut on 4 June 2023, starting in a 2–1 away loss against Real Sociedad. On 13 August 2025, he moved to Segunda División side Granada CF on a three-year deal.

== Honours ==
Sevilla

- UEFA Europa League: 2022–23

• uefa- champions-League:2020-2021
