= Jan Salas =

Spanish footballer

Personal information
- Full name: Miquel Jan Salas Franch
- Date of birth: 27 August 2005 (age 21)
- Place of birth: Sabadell, Spain
- Height: 1.82 m (6 ft 0 in)
- Position: Midfielder

Team information
- Current team: Mallorca
- Number: 28

Youth career
- 2013–2023: Mallorca

Senior career*
Years	Team	Apps	(Gls)
2023–	Mallorca B	63	(11)
2025–	Mallorca	6	(0)
2025–2026	→ Córdoba (loan)	4	(0)

International career
2025–	Spain U20	2	(0)
- * Club domestic league appearances and goals as of 3 January 2026

Miquel Jan Salas Franch (born 27 August 2005) is a Spanish professional footballer who plays as a midfielder for RCD Mallorca.

== Career ==
Born in Sabadell, Catalonia but raised in Binissalem, Majorca, Balearic Islands, Salas joined RCD Mallorca's youth sides in 2013, aged eight. He made his senior debut with the reserves on 26 March 2023, coming on as a late substitute in a 2–0 Segunda Federación away loss to SCR Peña Deportiva.

On 17 July 2024, after helping the B-side to return to the fourth division, Salas renewed his contract with the Bermellones until 2028. He made his first team – and La Liga – debut the following 1 February, replacing Dani Rodríguez late into a 2–0 away loss to Atlético Madrid.

On 1 September 2025, Salas was loaned to Segunda División side Córdoba CF for one year. The following 2 February, after just five appearances overall, his loan was cut short, and he suffered an anterior cruciate ligament shortly after.

On 17 July 2026, Salas renewed his link with Mallorca until 2029.

== Personal life ==
Salas' father Miguel Ángel was also a footballer. A centre-back, he never played in any higher than Segunda División B, notably representing CD Atlético Baleares, Terrassa and UE Figueres.

== Career statistics ==
As of match played 22 August 2025

Appearances and goals by club, season and competition
Club	Season	League			Copa del Rey		Europe		Other		Total	
Club	Season	Division	Apps	Goals	Apps	Goals	Apps	Goals	Apps	Goals	Apps	Goals
Mallorca B	2022–23	Segunda Federación	6	1	—		—		—		6	1
Mallorca B	2023–24	Tercera Federación	29	8	—		—		6 (Note: Appearances in 2024 Tercera Federación play-offs)	1	35	9
Mallorca B	2024–25	Segunda Federación	27	2	—		—		—		27	2
Mallorca B	Total		63	11	—		—		6	1	69	12
Mallorca	2024–25	La Liga	4	0	0	0	—		0	0	4	0
Mallorca	2025–26	La Liga	2	0	0	0	—		—		2	0
Mallorca	Total		6	0	0	0	—		0	0	6	0
Career total			69	11	0	0	0	0	6	1	75	12
