= Hugo Pérez (footballer, born 2002) =

Spanish footballer

Personal information
- Full name: Hugo Pérez Balderas
- Date of birth: 16 December 2002 (age 23)
- Place of birth: Barcelona, Spain
- Height: 1.89 m (6 ft 2 in)
- Position: Centre-back

Team information
- Current team: Torreense

Youth career
- Cornellà
- Gavà
- 2014–2017: Espanyol
- 2017–2021: Alavés

Senior career*
Years	Team	Apps	(Gls)
2020–2022	Alavés B	10	(0)
2022–2023	Villarreal C	23	(1)
2022–2025	Villarreal B	38	(1)
2025–2026	Espanyol	0	(0)
2025–2026	→ Huesca (loan)	4	(0)
2026	→ Gimnàstic (loan)	11	(0)
2026–	Torreense	0	(0)
- * Club domestic league appearances and goals as of 10 June 2026

Hugo Pérez Balderas (born 16 December 2002) is a Spanish footballer who plays as a central defender for Liga Portugal 2 club SCU Torreense.

== Club career ==
=== Early career ===
Pérez was born in Barcelona, Catalonia, and joined RCD Espanyol's youth setup in 2014, after representing CF Gavà's youth setup EF Gavà and UE Cornellà. He left the former in 2017, and finished his formation with Deportivo Alavés.

Pérez made his senior debut with the reserves on 1 November 2020, playing the last 16 minutes in a 3–0 Segunda División B away loss against Racing de Santander.

=== Villarreal ===
Pérez left Alavés in 2022, and subsequently joined Villarreal CF's C-team in Tercera Federación shortly after. He made his professional debut with Villarreal CF B on 7 October of that year, starting in a 3–1 away loss against Sporting de Gijón in the Segunda División.

Pérez was definitely promoted to the B-side in July 2023, but suffered a knee injury in October which led him to miss the remainder of the season, which ended in relegation. Back to action in August 2024, he became a regular starter for the B's in Primera Federación.

=== Espanyol ===
On 10 June 2025, Pérez returned to Espanyol on a three-year deal having spent three years with the club's youth academy. On 5 August, however, he was loaned to second division side SD Huesca, for one year.

On 20 January 2026, after being rarely used, Pérez's loan was cut short, and he moved to third division side Gimnàstic de Tarragona also in a temporary deal.

=== Torreense ===
On 1 July 2026, Pérez moved abroad for the first time in his career, signing for Liga Portugal 2 club SCU Torreense.

== Personal life ==
Pérez's father Raúl was also a footballer and a defender. He played mainly in the third tier, only appearing professionally with Elche CF and Ciudad de Murcia.
