= Ander Yoldi =

Spanish footballer (born 2000)

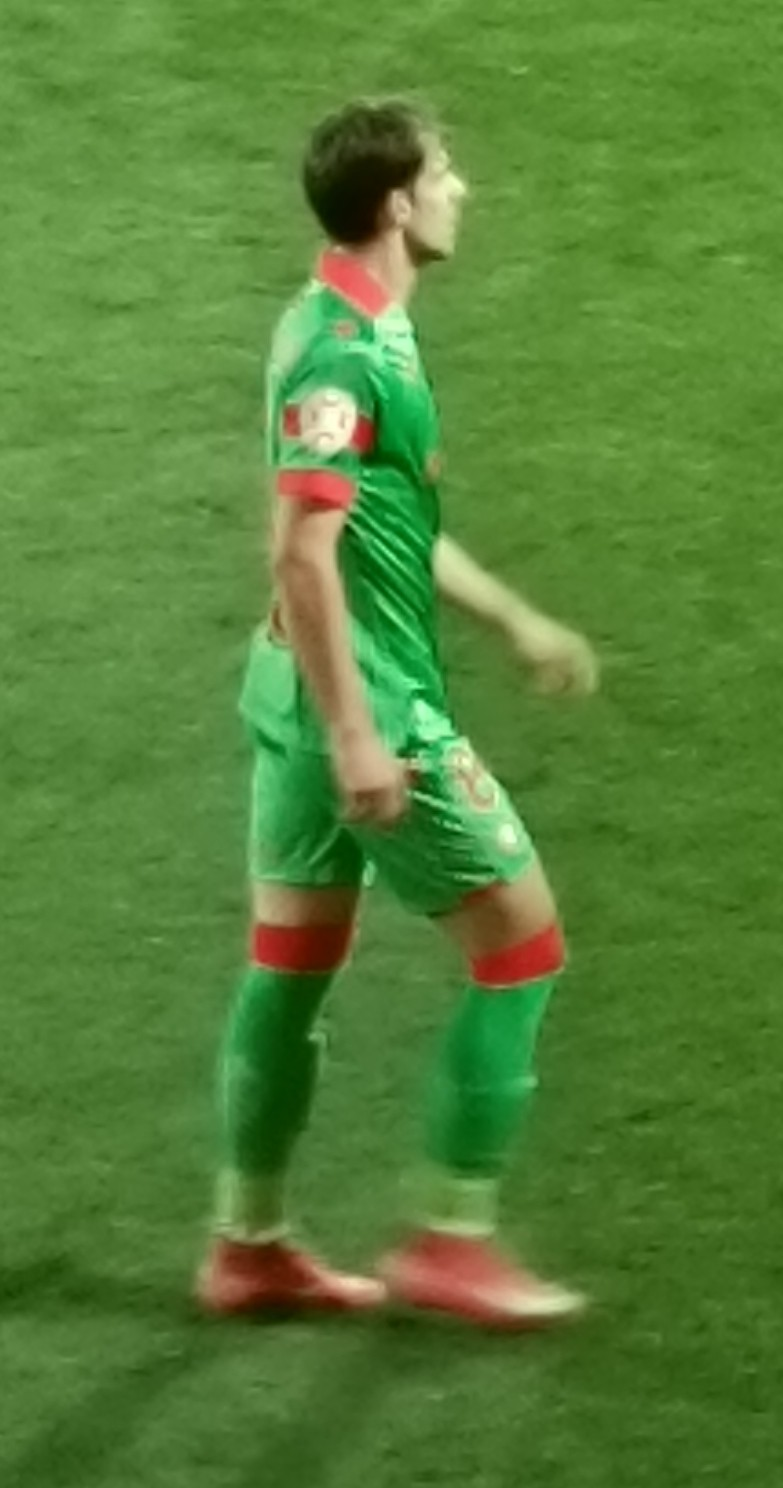
- Yoldi playing for Osasuna B in 2025

Personal information
- Full name: Ander Yoldi Aizagar
- Date of birth: 9 September 2000 (age 26)
- Place of birth: Pamplona, Spain
- Height: 1.87 m (6 ft 2 in)
- Position: Winger

Youth career
- Osasuna
- 2018–2019: Pamplona

Senior career*
Years	Team	Apps	(Gls)
2019–2020	Pamplona	31	(7)
2020–2021	Mutilvera	23	(4)
2021–2026	Osasuna B	113	(25)
2024–2025	→ Córdoba (loan)	40	(3)
- * Club domestic league appearances and goals as of 23 May 2026

Ander Yoldi Aizagar (born 9 September 2000) is a Spanish professional footballer. Mainly a left winger, he can also play as a forward.

== Career ==
Born in Pamplona, Yoldi began his career with the youth sides of CA Osasuna, before finishing his formation with CD Pamplona. He made his senior debut with the latter on 8 March 2019, coming on as a second-half substitute in a 3–1 Tercera División home win over CD Alesves.

Yoldi scored his first senior goal on 4 May 2019, netting the equalizer in a 2–1 away loss to CF Ardoi FE. In September 2020, he moved to Segunda División B side UD Mutilvera.

On 28 May 2021, Yoldi returned to Osasuna on a one-year contract, being assigned to the reserves in Segunda División RFEF. In October, however, he suffered a knee injury, being sidelined for the remainder of the season (which ended in promotion for the B's); the Rojillos also offered him a one-year extension.

Yoldi became an undisputed starter for the B-side during the 2023–24 campaign, where he scored a career-best 12 goals. On 29 May 2024, he extended his link until 2026, being promoted to the main squad, but was loaned to Segunda División side Córdoba CF on 8 August.

Yoldi made his professional debut on 16 August 2024, replacing Adilson late into a 1–0 away loss to CD Mirandés. He scored his first professional goal ten days later, netting a last-minute equalizer in a 2–2 home draw against Burgos CF.
