= Ismael Barea =

Spanish footballer (born 2005)

Personal information
- Full name: Ismael Barea Fernández
- Date of birth: 16 July 2005 (age 21)
- Place of birth: Los Palacios y Villafranca, Spain
- Height: 1.85 m (6 ft 1 in)
- Position: Midfielder

Team information
- Current team: Betis B

Youth career
- Betis
- 2019–2020: El Tinte
- 2020–2022: Utrera
- 2022–2023: San Roque Balompié
- 2023–2024: Betis

Senior career*
Years	Team	Apps	(Gls)
2024–	Betis B	41	(2)
2025–2026	→ Mirandés (loan)	11	(1)

International career
2025–	Spain U20	2	(0)
- * Club domestic league appearances and goals as of 10 June 2026

Ismael Barea Fernández (born 16 July 2005) is a Spanish professional footballer who plays as a central midfielder for Betis Deportivo.

== Club career ==
Born in Los Palacios y Villafranca, Seville, Andalusia, Barea began his career with Real Betis, but went on to play for CD El Tinte, CD Utrera and San Roque Balompié before returning to his first club in 2022. After playing in the Juvenil squad, he made his senior debut with the reserves on 28 January 2024, coming on as a late substitute for Yanis Senhadji in a 1–1 Segunda Federación away draw against Racing Cartagena Mar Menor FC.

Barea became a full member of the B-side during the 2024–25 Primera Federación, and scored his first senior goal on 9 November 2024, netting the opener in a 4–0 home routing of CD Alcoyano. The following 31 July, he renewed his contract until 2028, and was immediately loaned to Segunda División side CD Mirandés, for one year.

Barea made his professional debut on 17 August 2025, starting in a 1–0 away loss to Cádiz CF. On 28 January of the following year, his loan was cut short.
