= Jaime Vallejo =

Spanish footballer

Personal information
- Full name: Jaime Vallejo Mellado
- Date of birth: 18 May 2002 (age 24)
- Place of birth: Tudela, Spain
- Height: 1.79 m (5 ft 10 in)
- Position: Left-back

Youth career
- Corellano
- 2017–2021: Zaragoza

Senior career*
Years	Team	Apps	(Gls)
2021–2025	Zaragoza B	99	(8)
2025–2026	Zaragoza	2	(0)
2025–2026	→ Eldense (loan)	17	(1)
- * Club domestic league appearances and goals as of 23 May 2026

Jaime Vallejo Mellado (born 18 May 2002) is a Spanish footballer who plays as a right-back.

== Career ==
Born in Tudela, Navarre, Vallejo joined Real Zaragoza's youth categories in 2017, from CD Corellano. He made his senior debut with the reserves on 21 March 2021, starting in a 0–0 Tercera División away draw against SD Huesca B.

Vallejo scored his first senior goal on 14 November 2021, netting the B's second in a 3–0 Tercera División RFEF home win over Atlético Monzón, and was a regular starter for the side during the season as they achieved promotion to Segunda Federación. In April 2024, he suffered a knee injury during a match for the B-side.

On 30 July 2024, Vallejo renewed his contract with the Maños. He returned to action in January 2025, and made his first team debut on 7 February of that year, coming on as a late substitute for fellow youth graduate Adrián Liso in a 2–1 Segunda División away loss to Albacete Balompié.

On 4 August 2025, Vallejo was loaned to Primera Federación side CD Eldense for one year.
