= Betis Deportivo =

Association football club in Spain

- Full name: Betis Deportivo Balompié
- Nicknames: Béticos; Verdiblancos
- Founded: 15 July 1942; 84 years ago as Triana Balompié
- Ground: Ciudad Deportiva Luis del Sol
- Capacity: 2,100
- President: Ángel Haro García
- Head coach: Dani Fragoso
- League: Segunda Federación – Group 4
- 2025–26: Primera Federación – Group 2, 16th of 20 (relegated)
Home colours	Away colours

Betis Deportivo Balompié is a Spanish football team based in Seville, Andalusia, Spain. Founded in 1942, it is the reserve team of Real Betis and currently plays in Segunda Federación – Group 4, holding home games at Ciudad Deportiva Luis del Sol, with a 3000 seating-capacity.

Reserve teams in Spain play in the same football pyramid as their senior team, rather than a separate league. However, reserve teams cannot play in the same division as the main squad.

Reserve teams are also no longer permitted to enter the Copa del Rey. Additionally, only under-23 players or under-25 players with a professional contract can switch between senior and reserve teams.

== History ==
Founded in 1942 as Triana Balompié and named after a working class district in Seville. Legend has it that Betis, later to evolve into Real Betis, was formed in 1913 by a group of Sevilla FC directors after the club refused to sign a player who came from Triana.

In 1976, the team was renamed as Betis Deportivo and started to compile an impressive record in the Spanish U-19 Cup, winning the competition in 1983, 1990, 1998 and 1999, and finishing as runners-up in 1969 and 1992. This record was only bettered by FC Barcelona, Real Madrid and Athletic Bilbao, and Betis were also runners-up in the U-19 league in 1990.

Betis Deportivo spent the vast majority of its existence in Segunda División B and Tercera División, never reaching the promotion playoffs in the former category.

After being named as Real Betis B between 1991 and 2017, the club recovered the name of Betis Deportivo.

== Season to season ==
- As a farm team

Season	Tier	Division	Place	Copa del Rey
1964–65	3	3ª	6th	
1965–66	3	3ª	7th	
1966–67	3	3ª	5th	
1967–68	3	3ª	4th	
1968–69	3	3ª	3rd	
1969–70	3	3ª	6th	
1970–71	3	3ª	7th	
1971–72	3	3ª	17th	
1972–73	4	Reg. Pref.	4th	
1973–74	4	Reg. Pref.	4th	
1974–75	4	Reg. Pref.	3rd	
1975–76	4	Reg. Pref.	1st	
1976–77	3	3ª	19th	
1977–78	4	3ª	12th	

Season	Tier	Division	Place	Copa del Rey
1978–79	4	3ª	5th	
1979–80	4	3ª	9th	
1980–81	4	3ª	7th	
1981–82	4	3ª	8th	
1982–83	4	3ª	14th	
1983–84	4	3ª	2nd	
1984–85	4	3ª	1st	
1985–86	3	2ª B	15th	
1986–87	4	3ª	2nd	
1987–88	3	2ª B	14th	
1988–89	3	2ª B	18th	
1989–90	4	3ª	1st	
1990–91	3	2ª B	10th	

- As a reserve team

Season	Tier	Division	Place
1991–92	3	2ª B	7th
1992–93	3	2ª B	17th
1993–94	4	3ª	1st
1994–95	3	2ª B	11th
1995–96	3	2ª B	10th
1996–97	3	2ª B	14th
1997–98	3	2ª B	12th
1998–99	3	2ª B	9th
1999–00	3	2ª B	17th
2000–01	4	3ª	2nd
2001–02	3	2ª B	8th
2002–03	3	2ª B	15th
2003–04	3	2ª B	16th
2004–05	4	3ª	8th
2005–06	4	3ª	6th
2006–07	4	3ª	2nd
2007–08	3	2ª B	12th
2008–09	3	2ª B	11th
2009–10	3	2ª B	14th
2010–11	3	2ª B	16th

Season	Tier	Division	Place
2011–12	3	2ª B	8th
2012–13	3	2ª B	20th
2013–14	4	3ª	1st
2014–15	3	2ª B	8th
2015–16	3	2ª B	17th
2016–17	4	3ª	1st
2017–18	3	2ª B	19th
2018–19	4	3ª	6th
2019–20	4	3ª	1st
2020–21	3	2ª B	3rd / 4th
2021–22	3	1ª RFEF	20th
2022–23	4	2ª Fed.	12th
2023–24	4	2ª Fed.	5th
2024–25	3	1ª Fed.	13th
2025–26	3	1ª Fed.	16th
2026–27	4	2ª Fed.	

- 3 seasons in Primera Federación/Primera División RFEF
- 25 seasons in Segunda División B
- 3 seasons in Segunda Federación
- 28 seasons in Tercera División

== Current squad ==
As of 14 November 2026

Note: Flags indicate national team as defined under FIFA eligibility rules; some limited exceptions apply. Players may hold more than one non-FIFA nationality.

No.	Pos.	Nation	Player
1	GK	ESP	Álvaro de Pablo (on loan from Valladolid)
2	DF	ESP	Òscar Masqué
3	DF	ESP	Ian Forns
5	DF	CIV	Emmanuel N'Agoran
6	DF	ESP	Jorge Oreiro
8	MF	ESP	Rica Fúnez
9	FW	ESP	Rodrigo Marina
10	MF	ESP	Iván Corralejo
11	FW	ESP	Borja Alonso
13	GK	ESP	Manu González
14	FW	GHA	Kwame Sosu
16	MF	ESP	Migue Romero
17	FW	ESP	José Antonio Morante
19	MF	ESP	Cristo Muñoz
20	FW	ESP	Rafa Oya
21	MF	ESP	Enzo Fierro
22	MF	ESP	Marcos Mora

No.	Pos.	Nation	Player
23	DF	ESP	Curro Macías
24	DF	ESP	Carlos de Roa
25	GK	ESP	Alejandro Postigo
27	FW	ESP	Rubén de Sá
29	FW	ESP	Juanma Reyes
30	FW	ESP	Antonio González
32	FW	ESP	Fran Batán
33	DF	ESP	Mario Navarro
36	MF	ESP	Miguel Ángel Castilla
38	MF	ESP	Caye Cordón
39	MF	ESP	Kike Collantes
40	FW	SEN	Fara Ndiaye
—	DF	ESP	Fabián Embalo
—	DF	POR	Vasco Sousa
—	MF	ESP	Ismael Barea
—	FW	ESP	Antonio Toral

=== Reserve team ===
Note: Flags indicate national team as defined under FIFA eligibility rules; some limited exceptions apply. Players may hold more than one non-FIFA nationality.

No.	Pos.	Nation	Player
28	DF	ESP	Marcos Solís
34	MF	ESP	Thiago Acevedo

No.	Pos.	Nation	Player
35	DF	ESP	Miguel Cuevas
37	DF	ESP	Pablo López

=== Out on loan ===
Note: Flags indicate national team as defined under FIFA eligibility rules; some limited exceptions apply. Players may hold more than one non-FIFA nationality.

No.	Pos.	Nation	Player
—	MF	ESP	Adrián Martín (at Getafe B until 30 June 2027)
—	FW	BRA	João Fersura (at Cultural Leonesa until 30 June 2027)

=== Technical staff ===
Position	Name	Nationality
Manager:	Javi Medina	(Spain) Spanish
Assistant manager:	Ignacio Goyenechea 'Vasco'	(Spain) Spanish
Fitness coach:	Alberto Pérez	(Spain) Spanish
Goalkeeping coach:	David Relaño	(Spain) Spanish
Technical assistant:	Marco Fernández	(Spain) Spanish
Analyst:	Alejandro Mendoza	(Spain) Spanish
Delegate:	Álex Mohand	(Spain) Spanish
