= Iker Córdoba =

Spanish footballer (born 2005)

Personal information
- Full name: Iker Córdoba Sánchez
- Date of birth: 11 November 2005 (age 21)
- Place of birth: Els Pallaresos, Spain
- Height: 1.90 m (6 ft 3 in)
- Position: Centre-back

Team information
- Current team: Valencia

Youth career
- 2012–2015: Reus
- 2015–2023: Barcelona
- 2023–2024: Valencia

Senior career*
Years	Team	Apps	(Gls)
2023–2025	Valencia B	36	(1)
2024–	Valencia	2	(0)
2025–2026	→ Mirandés (loan)	23	(0)
- * Club domestic league appearances and goals as of 9 June 2026

Iker Córdoba Sánchez (born 11 November 2005) is a Spanish footballer who plays as a centre-back for Valencia CF.

== Career ==
Born in Els Pallaresos, Tarragona, Catalonia, Córdoba FC Barcelona's youth sides in 2015, from CF Reus Deportiu. At the age of sixteen, he almost joined the youth academy of German Bundesliga side FC Bayern Munich.

On 27 June 2023, Córdoba joined Valencia CF on a three-year contract, being initially assigned to the Juvenil squad. He made his senior debut with the reserves on 28 October 2023, coming on as a second-half substitute in a 2–1 Segunda Federación home loss to Hércules CF.

Córdoba made his first team debut with the Che on 26 November 2024, starting in a 1–0 away win over CP Parla Escuela, for the season's Copa del Rey. He scored his first senior goal on 4 December, netting the opener in a 3–1 win at SD Ejea, also for the national cup.

Córdoba made his professional – and La Liga – on 18 December 2024, replacing Diego López late into a 1–1 away draw against RCD Espanyol. Eight days later, he extended his contract with the club.

On 4 July 2025, Córdoba was loaned to Segunda División side CD Mirandés for the season.

== Style of play ==
Córdoba plays mainly as a centre-back, being sometimes deployed as a right-back. A right-footed player, "clean when bringing the ball out and, above all, powerful in the air, both in defence and attack".
