= Valencia CF Mestalla =

Spanish football team

Valencia Mestalla
- Full name: Valencia Club de Fútbol Mestalla
- Nicknames: Los Che; Els Taronges (The Oranges); Valencianistes; Los Murciélagos (The Bats); Mestalleta
- Founded: 1944
- Ground: Ciudad Deportiva de Paterna, Valencia, Valencian Community, Spain
- Capacity: 4,000
- Owner: Peter Lim
- President: Kiat Lim
- Head coach: Óscar Sánchez
- League: Segunda Federación – Group 3
- 2025–26: Segunda Federación – Group 3, 9th of 18
Home colours	Away colours

Valencia Club de Fútbol Mestalla, shortened to Valencia Mestalla, is the reserve team of Valencia CF, a Spanish football club based in Valencia, in the namesake community. Founded in 1944, and currently plays in Segunda Federación – Group 3, holding home games at Ciudad Deportiva de Paterna, with a 4,000-seat capacity.

Unlike in England, reserve teams in Spain play in the same football pyramid as their senior team rather than a separate league. However, reserve teams cannot play in the same division as their senior team. Therefore, the team is ineligible for promotion to La Liga, the division in which the main side plays. Reserve teams are also no longer permitted to enter the Copa de Europa.

== History ==
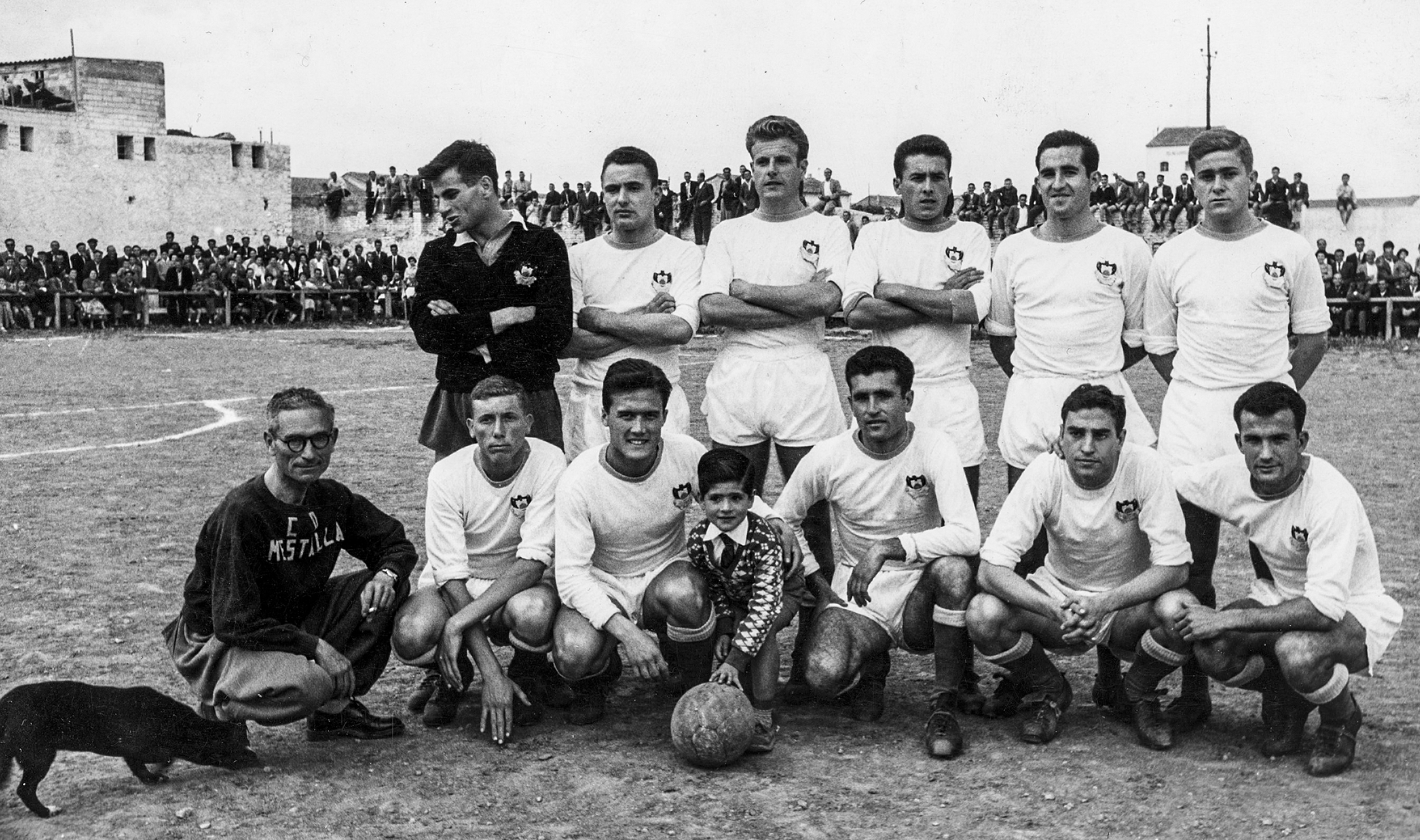
1958 Team, leader of the IX Group in 1957–58 Tercera División.

Founded in 1944 as Club Deportivo Mestalla, the club spent 21 seasons in the Segunda División in the period between 1947 and 1973, including a best ever finish of second place in the southern section in 1951–52; they went on to finish top of the promotion play-off group, but were ineligible for promotion to La Liga as the reserve team of Valencia CF, who were already playing in that division.

In 1972–73, the club finished bottom of the Segunda División and was relegated to the Tercera División; three years later, they were relegated again to the Valencian Regional Preferente, the top division of regional football in Spain. However, their stay was short-lived as a reorganisation of the Spanish league saw them reinstated to the Tercera División, now the fourth tier of the national football pyramid. They were briefly promoted back to the Segunda División B for the 1987–88 season, but were relegated again after finishing just one point from safety. In 1991, after three more seasons in the Tercera División, they merged fully with Valencia CF, officially becoming the club's B team.

In their first season as Valencia B, they finished top of their Tercera División and were promoted back to the Segunda División B. Since then, they have played all but five seasons in the Segunda División B, reaching a peak of second place in their group in 2001–02.

== Season-by-season ==
- As CD Mestalla

Season	Tier	Division	Place	Copa del Rey
1944–45	5	2ª Reg.	1st	
1945–46	4	1ª Reg.		
1946–47	3	3ª	2nd	
1947–48	2	2ª	8th	
1948–49	2	2ª	12th	
1949–50	2	2ª	6th	
1950–51	2	2ª	8th	
1951–52	2	2ª	2nd	
1952–53	2	2ª	6th	
1953–54	2	2ª	15th	
1954–55	3	3ª	2nd	
1955–56	2	2ª	6th	
1956–57	2	2ª	17th	
1957–58	3	3ª	1st	
1958–59	3	3ª	2nd	
1959–60	2	2ª	11th	
1960–61	2	2ª	10th	
1961–62	2	2ª	12th	
1962–63	2	2ª	9th	
1963–64	2	2ª	4th	

Season	Tier	Division	Place	Copa del Rey
1964–65	2	2ª	8th	
1965–66	2	2ª	6th	
1966–67	2	2ª	9th	
1967–68	2	2ª	8th	
1968–69	2	2ª	17th	
1969–70	3	3ª	2nd	
1970–71	3	3ª	1st	
1971–72	2	2ª	13th	
1972–73	2	2ª	20th	
1973–74	3	3ª	2nd	
1974–75	3	3ª	5th	
1975–76	3	3ª	18th	
1976–77	4	Reg. Pref.	3rd	
1977–78	4	3ª	6th	
1978–79	4	3ª	10th	
1979–80	4	3ª	5th	
1980–81	4	3ª	8th	
1981–82	4	3ª	3rd	
1982–83	4	3ª	1st	
1983–84	4	3ª	3rd	

Season	Tier	Division	Place	Copa del Rey
1984–85	4	3ª	1st	
1985–86	4	3ª	5th	
1986–87	4	3ª	5th	
1987–88	3	2ª B	16th	
1988–89	4	3ª	3rd	
1989–90	4	3ª	2nd	
1990–91	4	3ª	4th	

- Merged with Valencia

Season	Tier	Division	Place
1991–92	4	3ª	1st
1992–93	3	2ª B	12th
1993–94	3	2ª B	13th
1994–95	3	2ª B	3rd
1995–96	3	2ª B	4th
1996–97	3	2ª B	14th
1997–98	3	2ª B	14th
1998–99	3	2ª B	10th
1999–2000	3	2ª B	17th
2000–01	4	3ª	2nd
2001–02	3	2ª B	2nd
2002–03	3	2ª B	6th
2003–04	3	2ª B	17th
2004–05	4	3ª	1st
2005–06	4	3ª	2nd
2006–07	3	2ª B	16th
2007–08	4	3ª	2nd
2008–09	3	2ª B	12th
2009–10	3	2ª B	18th
2010–11	4	3ª	1st

Season	Tier	Division	Place
2011–12	3	2ª B	13th
2012–13	3	2ª B	16th
2013–14	3	2ª B	16th
2014–15	3	2ª B	14th
2015–16	3	2ª B	8th
2016–17	3	2ª B	3rd
2017–18	3	2ª B	11th
2018–19	3	2ª B	13th
2019–20	3	2ª B	16th
2020–21	3	2ª B	10th / 8th
2021–22	5	3ª RFEF	1st
2022–23	4	2ª Fed.	3rd
2023–24	4	2ª Fed.	11th
2024–25	4	2ª Fed.	6th
2025–26	4	2ª Fed.	9th
2026–27	4	2ª Fed.	

- 21 seasons in Segunda División
- 25 seasons in Segunda División B
- 5 seasons in Segunda Federación
- 28 seasons in Tercera División
- 1 season in Tercera División RFEF

== Players ==
=== Current squad ===
As of 8 September 2026.

Note: Flags indicate national team as defined under FIFA eligibility rules; some limited exceptions apply. Players may hold more than one non-FIFA nationality.

No.	Pos.	Nation	Player
1	GK	ESP	Raúl Jiménez
2	DF	ESP	Miguel Monferrer
3	DF	ESP	Marcos Navarro
4	DF	ESP	Alejandro Panach
5	DF	ESP	Joel Fontanet
6	MF	ESP	Mario Guilabert
7	FW	ESP	Marc Jurado
8	MF	ESP	Mario González
9	FW	ESP	Aimar Blázquez
10	FW	ESP	Pablo López
11	FW	GHA	Leslie Okai
13	GK	ARG	Alain Gómez
14	FW	ESP	Rubén Fernández

No.	Pos.	Nation	Player
15	DF	ESP	Carlos Alós
16	FW	ESP	Adrián Gómez
17	FW	ESP	Rodrigo Gamón
18	MF	ESP	Hugo Guijarro
19	MF	ROU	Alin Gera
20	MF	ESP	Adrián Ruiz
21	MF	ESP	Alejandro Estévez
22	FW	ESP	David Otorbi
23	DF	ESP	Rubén Muñoz de Morales
24	DF	ESP	Iker Córdoba
25	DF	KEN	Amos Wanjala
28	MF	ESP	Jaume Durà
30	MF	ESP	Aaron Mayol

=== From Youth Academy ===
Note: Flags indicate national team as defined under FIFA eligibility rules; some limited exceptions apply. Players may hold more than one non-FIFA nationality.

No.	Pos.	Nation	Player
27	FW	LTU	Dominykas Taučas
29	FW	MAR	Ismail El Aoud
31	DF	ESP	Héctor Mir
34	MF	ESP	Marc Martínez

No.	Pos.	Nation	Player
35	GK	ESP	Pablo Mollà
36	DF	VEN	Román Davis (on loan from Universidad Central)
38	DF	ESP	Iker Herrera
