= Iker Varela =

Spanish footballer

Personal information
- Full name: Iker Varela Parra
- Date of birth: 1 March 2003 (age 23)
- Place of birth: Barakaldo, Spain
- Height: 1.88 m (6 ft 2 in)
- Position: Winger

Team information
- Current team: Ibiza

Youth career
- 2012–2013: Danok Bat
- 2013–2022: Athletic Bilbao

Senior career*
Years	Team	Apps	(Gls)
2022–2023	Basconia	43	(13)
2022–2026	Bilbao Athletic	67	(13)
2025–2026	→ Mirandés (loan)	16	(1)
2026–	Ibiza	0	(0)
- * Club domestic league appearances and goals as of 9 June 2026

Iker Varela Parra (born 1 March 2003) is a Spanish footballer who plays as a winger for UD Ibiza.

== Career ==
Born in Barakaldo, Biscay, Basque Country, Varela joined Athletic Bilbao's Lezama in 2013, from Danok Bat CF. After progressing through the youth setup, he made his senior debut with farm team CD Basconia during the 2021–22 season, in Tercera División RFEF.

Varela first appeared with the reserves on 8 December 2022, coming on as a late substitute for Beñat Gerenabarrena in a 3–3 Segunda Federación away draw against CD Alcoyano. He finished the campaign with 13 goals for Basconia, and was subsequently promoted to the B-side permanently.

Varela was regularly used for Bilbao Athletic in the following years, and was called up to the first team for an UEFA Europa League match against Manchester United in May 2025, but remained unused in the 4–1 away loss. On 22 July, he moved to Segunda División side CD Mirandés on a one-year loan deal.

Varela made his professional debut on 17 August 2025, starting in a 1–0 away loss to Cádiz CF. The following 16 July, he signed a two-year deal with UD Ibiza in division three.
