= List of Spanish football transfers summer 2026 =

This is a list of Spanish football transfers for the 2026 summer transfer window. Only transfers featuring La Liga and Segunda División are listed.

The summer transfer window began on 1 July 2026, although a few transfers took place prior to that date. The window will close at midnight on 1 September 2026. Players without a club can join one at any time, either during or in between transfer windows. Clubs below La Liga level can also sign players on loan at any time. If needed, clubs can sign a goalkeeper on an emergency loan, if all others are unavailable.

== La Liga ==
=== Alavés ===
Manager: Quique Sánchez Flores (2nd season)

In:

Out:

No.	Pos.	Nation	Player
2	DF	ARG	Nicolás Valentini (from Fiorentina)
16	DF	FIN	Ville Koski (from Istra 1961, previously on loan)
18	MF	ESP	Mikel Rodríguez (from Real Sociedad B)
22	MF	ESP	Miguel Rodríguez (from Utrecht)

No.	Pos.	Nation	Player
—	MF	BRA	Calebe (loan return to Fortaleza, later loaned to Internacional)
—	DF	MLI	Moussa Diarra (to Al Wahda, previously on loan at Anderlecht)
—	FW	CIV	Ibrahim Diabate (loan return to GAIS)
—	GK	ESP	Raúl Fernández (to Leganés)
—	MF	ESP	Jon Guridi (to Sevilla)
—	DF	SRB	Nikola Maraš (fired, previously on loan at Mirandés)
—	GK	GEQ	Jesús Owono (to Andorra, previously on loan)
—	DF	ESP	Jon Pacheco (loan return to Real Sociedad)
—	DF	ESP	Víctor Parada (to Spartak Moscow)
—	FW	ESP	Asier Villalibre (to Racing Santander, previously on loan)

=== Athletic Bilbao ===
Manager: (Germany) Edin Terzić (1st season)

In:

Out:

No.	Pos.	Nation	Player
24	MF	ESP	Beñat Gerenabarrena (loan return from Castellón)

No.	Pos.	Nation	Player
2	DF	ESP	Andoni Gorosabel (on loan to Espanyol)
6	MF	ESP	Mikel Vesga (to Almería)
15	DF	ESP	Iñigo Lekue (retired)
19	DF	ESP	Adama Boiro (on loan to West Ham United)
20	MF	ESP	Unai Gómez (to Udinese)
25	FW	ESP	Urko Izeta (to Cádiz)
—	GK	ESP	Julen Agirrezabala (to Racing Santander, previously on loan at Valencia)
—	MF	ESP	Unai Vencedor (to Burgos, previously on loan at Levante)

=== Atlético Madrid ===
Manager: (Argentina) Diego Simeone (16th season)

In:

Out:

No.	Pos.	Nation	Player
7	MF	KOR	Lee Kang-in (from Paris Saint-Germain)
15	FW	CAN	Jonathan David (on loan from Juventus)
21	DF	ARG	Cristian Romero (from Tottenham Hotspur)
22	DF	ESP	Alejandro Grimaldo (from Bayer Leverkusen)
23	MF	DEN	Morten Hjulmand (from Sporting Lisbon)

No.	Pos.	Nation	Player
2	DF	URU	José María Giménez (on loan to Deportivo A Coruña)
3	DF	ITA	Matteo Ruggeri (to Aston Villa)
7	FW	FRA	Antoine Griezmann (to Orlando City)
11	MF	ARG	Thiago Almada (to River Plate)
15	DF	FRA	Clément Lenglet (on loan to Benfica)
16	DF	ARG	Nahuel Molina (to Roma)
27	MF	ESP	Jano Monserrate (to Ajax)
29	MF	ESP	Rayane Belaid (to Rayo Vallecano)
32	DF	ESP	Javier Boñar (to Girona)
34	DF	ESP	Julio Díaz (to Sevilla)
38	MF	ESP	Iker Luque (to Racing Santander)
47	MF	ESP	Javi Morcillo (to Elche)
—	MF	FRA	Thomas Lemar (on loan to Elche, previously on loan at Girona)
—	FW	ESP	Carlos Martín (on loan to Hajduk Split, previously on loan at Rayo Vallecano)

=== Barcelona ===
Manager: (Germany) Hansi Flick (3rd season)

In:

Out:

No.	Pos.	Nation	Player
2	DF	POR	João Cancelo (from Al Hilal, previously on loan)
9	FW	BRA	Gabriel Jesus (from Arsenal)
14	FW	GER	Karim Adeyemi (from Borussia Dortmund)
16	MF	ESP	Rodri (from Manchester City)
17	FW	ENG	Anthony Gordon (from Newcastle United)
25	GK	CRO	Dominik Livaković (from Fenerbahçe, previously on loan at Dinamo Zagreb)
27	MF	BEL	Jesse Bisiwu (from Club NXT)
29	FW	EGY	Hamza Abdelkarim (from Al Ahly, previously on loan)

No.	Pos.	Nation	Player
4	DF	URU	Ronald Araújo (on loan to Liverpool)
7	FW	ESP	Ferran Torres (to Paris Saint-Germain)
9	FW	POL	Robert Lewandowski (to Chicago Fire)
14	FW	ENG	Marcus Rashford (loan return to Manchester United, later TBD)
17	MF	ESP	Marc Casadó (on loan to Deportivo A Coruña)
26	DF	ESP	Jofre Torrents (to Ajax)
29	FW	ESP	Toni Fernández (on loan to Venezia)
30	MF	ESP	Guille Fernández (to Mallorca)
31	GK	USA	Diego Kochen (on loan to Lyngby)
32	DF	ESP	Alexis Olmedo (to Celta Fortuna)
36	DF	ESP	Álvaro Cortés (to Royal Antwerp)
37	MF	ESP	Dani Rodríguez (to Dinamo Zagreb)
43	MF	ESP	Tommy Marqués (to Braga)
—	GK	ESP	Ander Astralaga (to Atlético Madrileño, previously on loan at Granada)
—	GK	ESP	Iñaki Peña (to Panathinaikos, previously on loan at Elche)
—	GK	GER	Marc-André ter Stegen (on loan to Ajax, previously on loan at Girona)
—	GK	HUN	Áron Yaakobishvili (on loan to Almería, previously on loan at Andorra)
—	DF	ESP	Andrés Cuenca (to Como, previously on loan at Sporting Gijón, later loaned back)
—	DF	ESP	Héctor Fort (to Real Sociedad, previously on loan at Elche)
—	FW	ESP	Ansu Fati (to Monaco, previously on loan)

=== Betis ===
Manager: (Chile) Manuel Pellegrini (7th season)

In:

Out:

No.	Pos.	Nation	Player
6	MF	URU	Facundo Bernal (from Fluminense)
11	DF	ESP	Fran García (from Real Madrid)
13	GK	ESP	Diego Conde (on loan from Villarreal)
19	FW	IRL	Troy Parrott (from AZ)
25	MF	ESP	Dani Ceballos (from Real Madrid)

No.	Pos.	Nation	Player
6	MF	ESP	Sergi Altimira (to Sporting Lisbon)
9	FW	ARG	Chimy Ávila (to TBD)
11	FW	COD	Cédric Bakambu (to TBD)
12	DF	SUI	Ricardo Rodriguez (to TBD)
13	GK	ESP	Adrián San Miguel (retired)
25	GK	ESP	Pau López (to Andorra)
52	MF	ESP	Pablo García (to Racing Santander)
—	GK	POR	Guilherme Fernandes (to Córdoba, previously on loan at Valladolid)
—	DF	SEN	Nobel Mendy (to Rayo Vallecano, previously on loan, later sold to Hull City)
—	FW	URU	Gonzalo Petit (ton loan to Cádiz, previously on loan at Granada)

=== Celta Vigo ===
Manager: Claudio Giráldez (4th season)

In:

Out:

No.	Pos.	Nation	Player
1	GK	TUR	Altay Bayındır (on loan from Manchester United)
4	DF	SEN	Abdoulaye Faye (on loan from Bayer Leverkusen, previously on loan at Lorient)
14	MF	ESP	Aleix Febas (from Elche)
21	DF	URU	Sebastián Cáceres (from Club América)
22	DF	ESP	Javi Galán (from Osasuna)
24	FW	MAR	Couhaib Driouech (from PSV)

No.	Pos.	Nation	Player
3	DF	ESP	Óscar Mingueza (to Crystal Palace)
4	DF	GHA	Joseph Aidoo (to TBD)
8	MF	ESP	Fer López (loan return to Wolverhampton Wanderers, later TBD)
11	MF	ARG	Franco Cervi (to Rosario Central)
12	DF	ESP	Manu Fernández (to Cádiz)
15	MF	URU	Matías Vecino (to TBD)
21	DF	SRB	Mihailo Ristić (to TBD)
22	MF	ESP	Hugo Sotelo (on loan to Levante)
24	DF	ESP	Carlos Domínguez (on loan to Oviedo)
25	GK	ESP	Marc Vidal (to TBD)
—	DF	ESP	Unai Nuñez (on loan to Espanyol, previously on loan at Valencia)
—	DF	ESP	Manu Sánchez (on loan to Levante)
—	MF	ESP	Carlos Dotor (on loan to Málaga)
—	MF	ESP	Carles Pérez (to Girona, previously on loan at Aris)
—	MF	ESP	Damián Rodríguez (on loan to Cádiz, previously on loan at Racing Santander)

=== Deportivo A Coruña ===
Manager: Antonio Hidalgo (2nd season)

In:

Out:

No.	Pos.	Nation	Player
6	MF	ESP	Marc Casadó (on loan from Barcelona)
7	FW	GAB	Pierre-Emerick Aubameyang (from Olympique Marseille)
13	GK	ESP	Leo Román (from Mallorca)
16	MF	ITA	Lorenzo Amatucci (from Fiorentina, previously on loan at Las Palmas)
17	DF	ESP	Angeliño (on loan from Roma)
18	MF	DEN	Jonathan Asp Jensen (from Bayern Munich II, previously on loan at Grasshopper)
20	DF	URU	José María Giménez (on loan from Atlético Madrid)
22	DF	POL	Bright Ede (from Motor Lublin)
24	MF	ESP	Adama Traoré (from West Ham United)
—	MF	NED	Teun Gijselhart (from De Graafschap)

No.	Pos.	Nation	Player
6	MF	ENG	Charlie Patiño (on loan to VfL Bochum)
13	GK	ESP	Eric Puerto (on loan to Penafiel)
16	MF	ESP	José Gragera (loan return to Espanyol, later loaned to Burgos)
17	FW	ESP	Cristian Herrera (to TBD)
18	DF	ESP	Sergio Escudero (to Zaragoza)
20	MF	ESP	José Ángel (to TBD)
—	MF	NED	Teun Gijselhart (on loan to Al Ain)
—	MF	ESP	Diego Gómez (on loan to Huesca, previously on loan at Pontevedra)
—	FW	MAR	Mohamed Bouldini (to Académico de Viseu, previously on loan at Granada)

=== Elche ===
Manager: (Argentina) Martín Anselmi (1st season)

In:

Out:

No.	Pos.	Nation	Player
2	DF	ESP	Buba Sangaré (from Roma, previously on loan)
3	DF	ISR	Roy Revivo (from Maccabi Tel Aviv)
9	FW	ARG	Ezequiel Ponce (from Houston Dynamo)
10	MF	ARG	Facundo Buonanotte (on loan from Brighton & Hove Albion, previously on loan at Leeds United)
14	FW	ESP	Fer Niño (from Burgos)
15	DF	ARG	Kevin Lomónaco (from Independiente)
18	MF	FRA	Thomas Lemar (on loan from Atlético Madrid, previously on loan at Girona)
22	DF	ESP	Rubén Sánchez (from Espanyol)
47	MF	ESP	Javi Morcillo (from Atlético Madrid)
—	FW	ARG	Tiziano Perrotta (from Banfield)

No.	Pos.	Nation	Player
3	DF	ESP	Adrià Pedrosa (loan return to Sevilla, later loaned to Rayo Vallecano)
9	FW	POR	André Silva (to Porto)
10	FW	ESP	Rafa Mir (loan return to Sevilla, later loaned to Aris)
13	GK	ESP	Iñaki Peña (loan return to Barcelona, later signed by Panathinaikos)
14	MF	ESP	Aleix Febas (to Celta Vigo)
18	DF	ESP	John Chetauya (on loan to Mallorca)
20	FW	URU	Álvaro Rodríguez (to Bournemouth)
21	DF	FRA	Léo Pétrot (to Anderlecht)
22	DF	AUT	David Affengruber (to Fulham)
33	DF	ESP	Pablo Felipe (on loan to Teruel)
36	FW	ESP	Umaru Konare (on loan to Ceuta)
39	DF	ESP	Héctor Fort (loan return to Barcelona, later sold to Real Sociedad)
—	GK	ARG	Axel Werner (on loan to Rosario Central, previously on loan at Aldosivi)
—	FW	MAR	Nordin Al-Lal (on loan to Extremadura, previously on loan to Talavera de la Reina)
—	FW	ARG	Tiziano Perrotta (on loan to Defensa y Justicia)

=== Espanyol ===
Manager: Manolo González (4th season)

In:

Out:

No.	Pos.	Nation	Player
2	DF	ESP	Andoni Gorosabel (on loan from Athletic Bilbao)
3	DF	NED	Quilindschy Hartman (on loan from Burnley)
15	FW	ESP	Bryan Zaragoza (on loan from Bayern Munich, previously on loan at Roma)
16	DF	SLO	Vanja Drkušić (on loan from Zenit Saint Petersburg)
19	DF	ESP	Unai Nuñez (on loan from Celta Vigo, previously on loan at Valencia)
20	MF	BRA	Gabriel Moscardo (on loan from Paris Saint-Germain, previously on loan at Braga)
22	MF	ESP	Álex Calatrava (from Castellón)

No.	Pos.	Nation	Player
2	DF	ESP	Rubén Sánchez (to Elche)
5	DF	ESP	Fernando Calero (to Málaga)
12	DF	ESP	José Salinas (on loan to Málaga)
14	MF	ESP	Ramon Terrats (loan return to Villarreal, later signed by Getafe)
15	DF	ESP	Miguel Rubio (to Valladolid)
20	MF	ESP	Antoniu Roca (on loan to Mallorca)
22	DF	ESP	Carlos Romero (loan return to Villarreal)
32	MF	ESP	Lluc Castell (to Burnley)
—	DF	ESP	Hugo Pérez (to Torreense, previously on loan at Gimnàstic Tarragona)
—	DF	ESP	Pablo Ramón (to Racing Santander, previously on loan)
—	MF	ESP	José Gragera (on loan to Burgos, previously on loan at Deportivo A Coruña)

=== Getafe ===
Manager: José Bordalás (5th season)

In:

Out:

No.	Pos.	Nation	Player
4	DF	GEO	Saba Sazonov (from Torino)
8	MF	SRB	Nemanja Gudelj (from Sevilla)
10	FW	URU	Martín Satriano (from Lyon, previously on loan)
11	MF	ESP	Ramón Terrats (from Villarreal, previouly on loan at Espanyol)
14	DF	ESP	Dani Carvajal (from Real Madrid)
16	MF	ESP	Francho Serrano (from Zaragoza)
19	FW	TUR	Enes Ünal (from Bournemouth)
20	FW	ESP	Iván Azón (on loan from Como, previously on loan at Ipswich Town)
21	DF	ESP	Andrés García (on loan from Aston Villa)
23	MF	BEL	Orel Mangala (on loan from Lyon)
24	DF	ARG	Zaid Romero (from Club Brugge, previously on loan)
26	DF	CIV	Jean Ives Valou (on loan from Villarreal B)

No.	Pos.	Nation	Player
5	MF	ESP	Luis Milla (to Como)
8	MF	URU	Mauro Arambarri (to River Plate)
12	DF	CMR	Allan Nyom (to TBD)
14	MF	ESP	Javi Muñoz (to Almería)
16	DF	ESP	Diego Rico (to Osasuna)
19	FW	ARG	Luis Vázquez (loan return to Anderlecht, later signed by Birmingham City)
21	DF	ESP	Juan Iglesias (to Sevilla)
22	DF	POR	Domingos Duarte (to TBD)
29	FW	UKR	Mykyta Aleksandrov (to TBD)
31	DF	MAR	Ismael Bekhoucha (to Extremadura)
38	DF	UKR	Vladyslav Kysil (on loan to Ponferradina)
—	DF	ESP	Juan Berrocal (to Málaga, previously on loan at Atlanta United)
—	MF	CMR	Yvan Neyou (on loan to Volos, previously on loan at Al-Okhdood)
—	FW	DOM	Peter González (to Górnik Zabrze, previously on loan at Valladolid)

=== Levante ===
Manager: (Portugal) Luís Castro (2nd season)

In:

Out:

No.	Pos.	Nation	Player
2	DF	ALG	Aïssa Mandi (from Lille)
3	DF	AUT	Ifeanyi Ndukwe (on loan from Liverpool)
5	MF	ESP	Hugo Sotelo (on loan from Celta Vigo)
6	MF	ESP	Dani Requena (on loan from Villarreal, previously on loan at Córdoba)
10	FW	SRB	Petar Ratkov (on loan from Lazio)
11	FW	BEL	Yanis Musuayi (from Club NXT)
16	DF	FRA	Axel Tape (on loan from Bayer Leverkusen)
18	MF	FRA	Enzo Bardeli (from Dunkerque)
23	DF	ESP	Manu Sánchez (on loan from Celta Vigo)
24	MF	ARG	Thiago Fernández (on loan from Villarreal, previously on loan at Oviedo)

No.	Pos.	Nation	Player
5	DF	ESP	Unai Elgezabal (to Eibar)
6	DF	ESP	Diego Pampín (to Granada)
10	MF	ESP	Pablo Martínez (to TBD)
11	FW	ESP	José Luis Morales (to TBD)
12	MF	ESP	Unai Vencedor (loan return to Athletic Bilbao, later sold to Burgos)
14	MF	FRA	Ugo Raghouber (loan return to Lille, later signed by Burnley)
16	MF	HON	Kervin Arriaga (to AEK Athens)
19	FW	ESP	Carlos Espí (to Real Madrid)
24	MF	ESP	Carlos Álvarez (to Club América)
26	MF	ESP	Kareem Tunde (to West Bromwich Albion)
28	DF	PAN	Martín Krug (on loan to Juventud Torremolinos)
55	MF	ISR	Tai Abed (on loan to Valladolid)
—	GK	ESP	Dani Martín (on loan to Valladolid, previously on loan at Huesca)
—	DF	ESP	Xavi Grande (to Académica de Coimbra, previously on loan at Marítimo)
—	MF	ESP	Edgar Alcañiz (to Atlético Madrileño, previously on loan at Cartagena)

=== Málaga ===
Manager: Juan Francisco Funes (2nd season)

In:

Out:

No.	Pos.	Nation	Player
2	MF	SWE	Jens Cajuste (on loan from Napoli, previously on loan at Ipswich Town)
8	MF	ESP	Carlos Dotor (on loan from Celta Vigo)
12	DF	ESP	José Salinas (on loan from Espanyol)
19	MF	ESP	Juan Cruz (on loan from Leganés)
20	DF	ESP	Fernando Calero (from Espanyol)
25	DF	ESP	Juan Berrocal (from Getafe, previously on loan at Atlanta United)
39	DF	MAR	Adam Aznou (on loan from Everton)

No.	Pos.	Nation	Player
2	DF	ESP	Jokin Gabilondo (to Zaragoza)
5	MF	SRB	Darko Brašanac (to TBD)
14	DF	ESP	Víctor García (to TBD)
18	DF	ESP	Dani Sánchez (to TBD)
19	MF	ESP	Luismi (retired)
20	DF	ESP	Javi Montero (to TBD)
25	MF	ESP	Josué Dorrio (to TBD)

=== Osasuna ===
Manager: Luis Miguel Ramis (1st season)

In:

Out:

No.	Pos.	Nation	Player
15	DF	ESP	Diego Rico (from Getafe)
20	MF	FRA	Romain Del Castillo (from Brest)
21	FW	BEL	Jonathan Dubasin (from Sporting Gijón)
48	DF	GHA	Rockson Yeboah (from Göteborg)

No.	Pos.	Nation	Player
2	MF	ESP	Iker Benito (to Querétaro)
3	DF	ESP	Juan Cruz (to Oviedo)
20	DF	ESP	Javi Galán (to Celta Vigo)
21	MF	ESP	Víctor Muñoz (to Liverpool)

=== Racing Santander ===
Manager: José Alberto López (5th season)

In:

Out:

No.	Pos.	Nation	Player
3	DF	ESP	Aarón Martín (from Genoa)
5	DF	ESP	Pablo Ramón (from Espanyol, previously on loan)
8	MF	POR	André Almeida (on loan from Valencia)
12	FW	ESP	Asier Villalibre (from Alavés, previously on loan)
13	GK	ESP	Julen Agirrezabala (from Athletic Bilbao, previously on loan at Valencia)
15	MF	ESP	Pablo García (from Betis)
16	DF	URU	Facundo González (from Juventus, previously on loan)
18	MF	ITA	Matteo Prati (on loan from Cagliari, previously on loan at Torino)
19	MF	ESP	Iker Luque (from Atlético Madrid)
20	MF	ESP	Sergio Canales (from Monterrey)
21	FW	MAR	Yassir Zabiri (on loan from Rennes)
22	DF	BRA	Pedro Felipe (from Juventus, previously on loan at Sassuolo)
23	MF	ESP	Iván Martín (from Girona)
24	DF	FRA	Jeanuël Belocian (on loan from Bayer Leverkusen, previously on loan at VfL Wolfsburg)

No.	Pos.	Nation	Player
1	GK	ESP	Jokin Ezkieta (on loan to Cádiz)
3	DF	ESP	Mario García (to Widzew Łódź)
5	DF	ESP	Javi Castro (to Cádiz)
8	MF	ESP	Aritz Aldasoro (on loan to Oviedo)
15	MF	ESP	Marco Sangalli (to TBD)
17	FW	ESP	Jaime Mata (to TBD)
19	MF	COL	Gustavo Puerta (to Olympiacos)
20	MF	GAM	Suleiman Camara (to Slovan Bratislava)
23	MF	ESP	Damían Rodríguez (loan return to Celta Vigo, later loaned to Cádiz)
34	MF	ESP	Diego Díaz (on loan to Andorra)
36	MF	ESP	Sergio Martínez (to Real Madrid Castilla)
—	MF	ESP	Yeray Cabanzón (to Valladolid, previously on loan at Andorra)

=== Rayo Vallecano ===
Manager: Beñat San José (1st season)

In:

Out:

No.	Pos.	Nation	Player
3	DF	ALB	Marash Kumbulla (on loan from Roma, previously on loan at Mallorca)
14	MF	GEO	Giorgi Tsitaishvili (from Dynamo Kyiv, previously on loan at Metz)
15	DF	ESP	Mujaid Sadick (on loan from Genk)
17	DF	ESP	Adrià Pedrosa (on loan from Sevilla, previously on loan at Elche)
22	DF	ESP	Pelayo Fernández (loan return from Cádiz)
25	GK	IDN	Emil Audero (on loan from Como, previously on loan at Cremonese)
36	MF	ESP	Gnangoro Bouare (from Betis Deportivo)
37	MF	ESP	Rayane Belaid (from Atlético Madrid)
—	DF	SEN	Nobel Mendy (from Betis, previously on loan)

No.	Pos.	Nation	Player
3	DF	ESP	Pep Chavarría (to Chelsea)
8	MF	ARG	Óscar Trejo (retired)
14	FW	ESP	Carlos Martín (loan return to Atlético Madrid, later loaned to Hajduk Split)
16	DF	GHA	Abdul Mumin (to TBD)
22	DF	URU	Pacha Espino (to Racing Avellaneda)
32	DF	SEN	Nobel Mendy (to Hull City)
—	FW	CMR	Etienne Eto'o (on loan to Racing Ferrol, previously on loan at Villarreal B)

=== Real Madrid ===
Manager: (Portugal) José Mourinho (1st season)

In:

Out:

No.	Pos.	Nation	Player
9	FW	BRA	Endrick (loan return from Lyon)
16	DF	FRA	Ibrahima Konaté (from Liverpool)
17	DF	ESP	Marc Cucurella (from Chelsea)
19	FW	ESP	Carlos Espí (from Levante)
20	MF	POR	Bernardo Silva (from Manchester City)
24	DF	NED	Denzel Dumfries (from Inter)
25	FW	CIV	Yan Diomande (from RB Leipzig)

No.	Pos.	Nation	Player
2	DF	ESP	Dani Carvajal (to Getafe)
4	DF	AUT	David Alaba (to Udinese)
16	FW	ESP	Gonzalo García (to Fulham)
19	MF	ESP	Dani Ceballos (to Betis)
20	DF	ESP	Fran García (to Betis)
26	GK	ESP	Fran González (to Sevilla)
30	MF	ARG	Franco Mastantuono (on loan to Fiorentina)
37	MF	ESP	Manuel Ángel (to Fulham)
38	MF	ESP	César Palacios (to Fulham)
40	DF	ESP	Víctor Valdepeñas (to Fiorentina)

=== Real Sociedad ===
Manager: (United States) Pellegrino Matarazzo (2nd season)

In:

Out:

No.	Pos.	Nation	Player
19	DF	SEN	Mamadou Sarr (on loan from Chelsea)
22	DF	ESP	Héctor Fort (from Barcelona, previously on loan at Elche)

No.	Pos.	Nation	Player
6	DF	ESP	Aritz Elustondo (to PAOK Thessaloniki)
19	FW	ESP	Jon Karrikaburu (to Burgos)
23	MF	ESP	Brais Méndez (to Columbus Crew)
—	DF	ESP	Javi López (on loan to Feyenoord, previously on loan at Oviedo)
—	MF	ESP	Mikel Goti (on loan to Oviedo, previously on loan at Córdoba)
—	FW	ESP	Carlos Fernández (to Oviedo, previously on loan at Mirandés)

=== Sevilla ===
Manager: Luis García Plaza (2nd season)

In:

Out:

No.	Pos.	Nation	Player
1	GK	GRE	Odysseas Vlachodimos (on loan from Newcastle United)
2	DF	ESP	Juan Iglesias (from Getafe)
3	DF	ESP	Julio Díaz (from Atlético Madrid)
8	MF	GEO	Giorgi Kochorashvili (from Sporting CP)
9	FW	SCO	Robbie Ure (from Sirius)
12	DF	SEN	Arouna Sangante (from Le Havre)
13	GK	ESP	Fran González (from Real Madrid)
18	MF	ESP	Jon Guridi (from Alavés)
19	FW	BEL	Lucas Stassin (on loan from Saint-Étienne)
20	MF	POR	Félix Correia (on loan from Lille)
24	MF	FRA	Youssouf Fofana (on loan from Milan)

No.	Pos.	Nation	Player
3	DF	ESP	César Azpilicueta (retired)
5	DF	FRA	Tanguy Nianzou (to Lille)
6	MF	SRB	Nemanja Gudelj (to Getafe)
8	MF	ESP	Joan Jordán (to Estrela da Amadora)
9	FW	NGR	Akor Adams (to Venezia)
11	MF	CHI	Alexis Sánchez (to CF Montréal)
13	GK	NOR	Ørjan Nyland (to RB Leipzig)
16	DF	ESP	Juanlu Sánchez (to Bournemouth)
17	FW	FRA	Neal Maupay (loan return to Marseille)
19	DF	FRA	Batista Mendy (loan return to Trabzonspor)
20	MF	SUI	Djibril Sow (to Genoa)
22	DF	ARG	Federico Gattoni (to Ascoli)
24	MF	BEL	Adnan Januzaj (to TBD)
31	GK	ESP	Alberto Flores (to Granada)
36	DF	ESP	Oso (to Strasbourg)
—	DF	ESP	Adrià Pedrosa (on loan to Rayo Vallecano, previously on loan at Elche)
—	FW	ESP	Rafa Mir (on loan to Aris, previously on loan at Elche)

=== Valencia ===
Manager: Carlos Corberán (3rd season)

In:

Out:

No.	Pos.	Nation	Player
2	MF	ARG	Guido Rodríguez (from West Ham United)
10	DF	ENG	Harvey Elliott (on loan from Liverpool, previously on loan at Aston Villa)
12	DF	NED	Justin de Haas (from Famalicão)
15	MF	MLI	Aliou Dieng (from Al Ahly)
22	DF	ESP	Arnau Martínez (from Girona)
24	DF	ESP	Pablo Maffeo (on loan from Olympiacos)
25	GK	NED	Kayne van Oevelen (on loan from Ipswich Town)
39	MF	JPN	Ryunosuke Sato (from FC Tokyo)

No.	Pos.	Nation	Player
4	DF	ESP	Unai Nuñez (loan return to Celta Vigo, later loaned to Espanyol)
10	MF	POR	André Almeida (on loan to Racing Santander)
12	DF	POR	Thierry Correia (to Venezia)
15	FW	ARG	Lucas Beltrán (loan return to Fiorentina, later loaned to River Plate)
22	MF	FRA	Baptiste Santamaria (to PAOK Thessaloniki)
24	DF	SUI	Eray Cömert (to Torino)
25	GK	ESP	Julen Agirrezabala (loan return to Athletic Bilbao, later sold to Racing Santander)
39	FW	ESP	Mario Domínguez (on loan to Excelsior)
—	DF	TUR	Cenk Özkacar (to Trabzonspor, previously on loan at 1. FC Köln)
—	FW	ESP	Alberto Marí (to Kispest-Honvéd, previously on loan at Mirandés)

=== Villarreal ===
Manager: Iñigo Pérez (1st season)

In:

Out:

No.	Pos.	Nation	Player
20	DF	ESP	Carlos Romero (loan return from Espanyol)
24	MF	CAN	Nathan Saliba (from Anderlecht)
25	GK	HUN	Péter Gulácsi (from RB Leipzig)

No.	Pos.	Nation	Player
5	DF	COD	Willy Kambwala (on loan to Como)
10	MF	ESP	Dani Parejo (to TBD)
13	GK	ESP	Diego Conde (on loan to Betis)
24	DF	ESP	Alfonso Pedraza (to Lazio)
25	GK	ESP	Arnau Tenas (on loan to Mallorca)
30	DF	ESP	Dani Budesca (on loan to Córdoba)
32	MF	ESP	Hugo López (on loan to Andorra)
33	FW	ESP	Pau Cabanes (to Eldense)
—	MF	ARG	Thiago Fernández (on loan to Levante, previously on loan at Oviedo)
—	MF	ESP	Dani Requena (on loan to Levante, previously on loan at Córdoba)
—	MF	ESP	Ramon Terrats (to Getafe, previously on loan at Espanyol)
—	FW	ESP	Álex Forés (to Burgos, previously on loan at Oviedo)

== Segunda División ==
=== Albacete ===
Manager: Alberto González (4th season)

In:

Out:

No.	Pos.	Nation	Player
1	GK	ESP	Carlos Marín (from Córdoba)
9	FW	ESP	Mario Soberón (from Zaragoza)
10	MF	ESP	Rober (from NEC, previously on loan at Zaragoza)
16	FW	MAR	Munir El Haddadi (from Esteghlal)
17	MF	ESP	José Corpas (from Eibar)
18	MF	ESP	Sergio Ortuño (from Cádiz)
32	FW	URU	Agustín Albarracín (on loan from Cagliari)

No.	Pos.	Nation	Player
3	DF	MEX	Jonathan Gómez (loan return to PAOK Thessaloniki)
10	FW	ESP	Jefté Betancor (loan return to Olympiacos, later signed by Las Palmas)
13	GK	ESP	Raúl Lizoain (to Granada)
16	MF	ESP	José Carlos Lazo (to TBD)
17	MF	ESP	Ale Meléndez (to Ceuta)

=== Almería ===
Manager: Francisco Javier García Pimienta (1st year)

In:

Out:

No.	Pos.	Nation	Player
2	DF	ESP	Jorge Pulido (from Huesca)
6	MF	ESP	Mikel Vesga (from Athletic Bilbao)
14	MF	ESP	Javi Muñoz (from Getafe)
15	DF	POR	Leonardo Lelo (on loan from Braga)
17	MF	COD	Brian Cipenga (from Castellón)
20	MF	ESP	Álex Sola (from Granada)
24	FW	ESP	Miguel de la Fuente (from Leganés, previously on loan)
31	GK	HUN	Áron Yaakobishvili (on loan from Barcelona, previously on loan at Andorra)
32	DF	SRB	Andrej Popović (from Hellas Verona)
33	MF	ESP	Quim Junyent (from Barcelona B)
—	MF	POR	André Horta (from Braga, previously on loan)

No.	Pos.	Nation	Player
2	MF	ESP	Arnau Puigmal (to Mallorca)
4	DF	POR	Nélson Monte (on loan to Córdoba)
17	MF	SEN	Dion Lopy (to Al-Ittihad)
19	MF	CMR	Patrick Soko (on loan to Leganés)
20	DF	ESP	Álex Centelles (to Levski Sofia)
31	GK	ESP	Bruno Iribarne (to Burgos)
—	DF	ESP	Edgar González (on loan to Sabadell, previously on loan at Andorra)
—	DF	MOZ	Bruno Langa (to Qarabağ, previously on loan at Estrela da Amadora)
—	DF	ESP	Alejandro Pozo (to ADO Den Haag, previously on loan at Jagiellonia Białystok)
—	MF	ESP	Selvi Clua (on loan to Casa Pia, previously on loan at Mirandés)
—	MF	POR	André Horta (to Al-Ula)
—	MF	MNE	Marko Perović (to Raków Częstochowa, previously on loan at Atlético Madrileño)
—	FW	URU	Juan Manuel Gutiérrez (to Defensa y Justicia, previously on loan)
—	FW	SRB	Marko Milovanović (to Portsmouth, previously on loan at Alverca)

=== Andorra ===
Manager: Carles Manso (2nd season)

In:

Out:

No.	Pos.	Nation	Player
2	DF	ESP	Juan Sebastián (from Zaragoza)
3	DF	ARG	Lautaro Spatz (from Villarreal B)
6	MF	ESP	Hugo Solozábal (from Getafe B)
9	FW	NED	Julian Rijkhoff (on loan from Jong Ajax)
12	MF	ROU	Enes Sali (from FC Dallas, previously on loan at Al-Riyadh)
13	GK	ESP	Pau López (from Betis)
15	FW	ESP	Jordi Cano (from Europa)
16	MF	PHI	Randy Schneider (from Winterthur)
18	DF	ESP	Andoni López (from Ponferradina)
19	MF	ESP	Nacho Quintana (from Eldense)
21	FW	ESP	Moró Sidibe (from Atlètic Lleida)
22	MF	ESP	Diego Díaz (on loan from Racing Santander)
25	GK	GEQ	Jesús Owono (from Alavés, previously on loan)
29	MF	ESP	Hugo López (on loan from Villarreal)
—	MF	AND	Aron Rodrigo (from Huesca B)

No.	Pos.	Nation	Player
2	DF	ESP	Álex Petxarroman (loan return to Deportivo A Coruña, later signed by Ceuta)
3	MF	ESP	Yeray Cabanzón (loan return to Racing Santander, later signed by Valladolid)
6	MF	ESP	Dani Villahermosa (to Oviedo)
9	FW	ESP	Manu Nieto (to Eldense)
10	MF	ESP	Álvaro Martín (to Castellón)
12	DF	ESP	Edgar González (loan return to Almería, later loaned to Sabadell)
16	MF	POR	Jastin García (loan return to Girona)
19	DF	ESP	Imanol García de Albéniz (loan return to Sparta Prague, later signed by Eibar)
21	MF	ESP	Josep Cerdà (to Mallorca)
22	FW	ESP	Marc Cardona (to TBD)
25	GK	HUN	Áron Yaakobishvili (loan return to Barcelona, later loaned to Almería)
29	MF	KOR	Kim Min-su (loan return to Girona, later sold to Rangers)
31	GK	ESP	Jan Lagunas (on loan to Santa Coloma)
—	DF	ESP	Jan Encuentra (to Villarreal B, previously on loan at Unionistas de Salamanca)
—	DF	AND	Iván Rodríguez (on loan to Huesca, previously on loan at Villarreal B)
—	MF	ESP	Luismi Redondo (to Huesca, previously on loan at Cartagena)
—	MF	AND	Aron Rodrigo (on loan to Mirandés)
—	FW	ESP	Bilal Achhiba (on loan to Manresa, previously on loan at Atlètic Lleida)
—	FW	COL	Juanda Fuentes (to Penafiel, previously on loan at Gimnàstic Tarragona)
—	FW	AND	Berto Rosas (on loan to Logroñés)
—	FW	ESP	Aitor Uzkudun (on loan to Mirandés, previously on loan at Avilés Industrial)

=== Burgos ===
Manager: Sergio Francisco (1st season)

In:

Out:

No.	Pos.	Nation	Player
1	GK	ESP	Bruno Iribarne (from Almería)
3	DF	ESP	Ignasi Vilarrasa (from Córdoba)
7	FW	ESP	Jon Karrikaburu (from Real Sociedad)
9	FW	ESP	Álex Forés (from Villarreal, previously on loan at Oviedo)
12	MF	ESP	Unai Vencedor (from Athletic Bilbao, previously on loan at Levante)
15	DF	ESP	Oier Luengo (from Oviedo, previously on loan)
19	MF	ESP	Javi Llabrés (from Mallorca)
20	MF	ESP	José Gragera (on loan from Espanyol, previously on loan at Deportivo A Coruña)
23	DF	ESP	Alberto Dadie (from Real Sociedad B)
24	MF	ARG	Santiago Lencina (on loan from River Plate)

No.	Pos.	Nation	Player
1	GK	ESP	Jesús Ruiz (to Mirandés)
5	MF	ESP	Miguel Atienza (to Leganés)
7	MF	COL	Mateo Mejía (on loan to Panetolikos)
9	FW	ESP	Fer Niño (to Elche)
12	DF	FRA	Florian Miguel (to Metz)
15	DF	ESP	Aitor Buñuel (to TBD)
20	FW	ESP	Mario González (to Noah)
21	MF	ESP	Iñigo Córdoba (to Castellón)
23	MF	ESP	Iván Morante (to Girona)

=== Cádiz ===
Manager: Imanol Idiakez (2nd season)

In:

Out:

No.	Pos.	Nation	Player
2	DF	ESP	Beñat de Jesús (from Barakaldo)
4	DF	ESP	Javi Castro (from Racing Santander)
5	MF	FRA	Marco Doué (from Castellón)
6	DF	ESP	Manu Fernández (from Celta Vigo)
12	DF	GEO	Giorgi Gocholeishvili (on loan from Shakhtar Donetsk)
13	GK	ESP	Jokin Ezkieta (on loan from Racing Santander)
15	DF	COM	Kenan Toibibou (from Bravo)
16	MF	ESP	Antonio Cordero (on loan from Newcastle United)
17	MF	MAR	Aïmen Moueffek (on loan from Saint-Étienne)
18	MF	ESP	Jandro Orellana (from Estoril)
19	FW	ESP	Urko Izeta (from Athletic Bilbao)
21	FW	UKR	Vladyslav Kopotun (from Alcorcón)
22	DF	ESP	Cristian Gutiérrez (on loan from Las Palmas)
23	MF	ESP	Damián Rodríguez (on loan from Celta Vigo, previously on loan at Racing Santander)
24	MF	ESP	Ibon Sánchez (from Bilbao Athletic)
25	FW	URU	Gonzalo Petit (on loan from Betis, previously on loan at Granada)
28	MF	ESP	Dilan Zárate (on loan from Inter Milan U23)
—	MF	ESP	José Andújar (from Atlético Sanluqueño)

No.	Pos.	Nation	Player
2	DF	ESP	Jorge Moreno (to Tenerife)
3	MF	MLI	Rominigue Kouamé (to Clermont)
5	MF	MLI	Moussa Diakité (on loan to Çaykur Rizespor)
6	DF	ESP	Iker Recio (to Eldense)
7	FW	ESP	Lucas Pérez (to TBD)
8	MF	ESP	Álex Fernández (to Dibba Al-Hisn)
9	FW	ESP	Roger Martí (to TBD)
10	FW	URU	Brian Ocampo (to Coritiba)
13	GK	BRA	Victor Aznar (to Lion City Sailors)
15	MF	ESP	Sergio Ortuño (to Albacete)
17	FW	MTN	Dawda Camara (loan return to Girona, later sold to Alverca)
18	MF	MLI	Yussi Diarra (on loan to Córdoba)
19	FW	ESP	José Antonio de la Rosa (to Wieczysta Kraków)
24	MF	ESP	Joaquín González (on loan to Ceuta)
27	DF	ESP	Pelayo Fernández (loan return to Rayo Vallecano)
29	DF	ECU	Alfred Caicedo (loan return to Jong Genk, later sold to Vizela)
33	DF	ESP	Raúl Pereira (to Zaragoza)
37	FW	ARG	Jerónimo Dómina (on loan to Tigre)
—	MF	GHA	Isaac Obeng (to Hércules, previously on loan at Algeciras)

=== Castellón ===
Manager: Pablo Hernández (2nd season)

In:

Out:

No.	Pos.	Nation	Player
1	GK	KOS	Amir Saipi (from Lugano)
2	DF	ESP	Juanjo Nieto (from Celje)
4	DF	ARG	Agustín Sienra (from Defensa y Justicia, previously on loan)
6	MF	COL	Matías Orozco (on loan from Brighton & Hove Albion)
11	DF	ITA	Federico Ceccherini (from Cremonese)
14	MF	ESP	Iñigo Córdoba (from Burgos)
15	DF	GRE	Ilias Kostis (from Atlético Madrileño)
17	MF	ESP	Fran Castillo (from Ibiza)
19	MF	MAR	Hamza Bellari (from Valencia Mestalla, previously on loan at Eldense)
21	MF	ESP	Álvaro Martín (from Andorra)
24	FW	ANG	David Nzanza (from Leça)
25	MF	NED	Jari Vlak (from ADO Den Haag)
26	MF	POR	Rodrigo Rêgo (on loan from Brighton & Hove Albion, previously at Benfica B)
27	MF	ITA	Antonio Gala (from Campobasso)

No.	Pos.	Nation	Player
1	GK	IRI	Amir Abedzadeh (to TBD)
6	MF	FRA	Marco Doué (to Cádiz)
7	MF	AUS	Awer Mabil (to Melbourne City)
11	FW	BRA	Douglas Aurélio (on loan to Huesca)
15	MF	ESP	Beñat Gerenabarrena (loan return to Athletic Bilbao)
16	MF	COD	Brian Cipenga (to Almería)
17	DF	ESP	Salva Ruiz (to Huesca)
21	MF	ESP	Álex Calatrava (to Espanyol)
25	MF	BRA	Ronaldo Pompeu (to TBD)
27	DF	MAR	Ismael Fadel (on loan to Ibiza)
37	MF	ESP	Carlos Segura (to Gimnàstic Tarragona)
—	DF	ESP	José Albert (on loan to Zamora, previously on loan at Ibiza)
—	MF	FRA	Albert Lottin (to União de Leiria, previously on loan)
—	MF	ESP	Serpeta (on loan to Águilas, previously on loan at Unionistas de Salamanca)
—	MF	MLI	Mamadou Traoré (to TBD, previously on loan at Teruel)

=== Celta Fortuna ===
Manager: Fredi Álvarez (4th season)

In:

Out:

No.	Pos.	Nation	Player
7	MF	GHA	Bernard Somuah (from Asante Kotoko, previously on loan at)
17	MF	ESP	Hugo Cuenca (on loan from Genoa, previously on loan at Burgos B)
21	DF	ESP	Alexis Olmedo (from Barcelona)
22	MF	ESP	Stefan Bajcetic (from Liverpool)

No.	Pos.	Nation	Player
—	DF	ESP	Jaime Vázquez (loan return to Oviedo, later TBD)

=== Ceuta ===
Manager: José Juan Romero (4th season)

In:

Out:

No.	Pos.	Nation	Player
15	MF	ESP	Joaquín González (on loan from Cádiz)
27	FW	ESP	Umaru Konare (on loan from Elche)
—	GK	FRA	Ayoub Akabou (from Rennes)
—	MF	ESP	Álex Camacho (from Juventud Torremolinos)
—	FW	ESP	Jordi Escobar (from Huesca)
—	DF	ESP	Adrián Lapeña (from CSKA Sofia)
—	MF	NGR	Kenneth Mamah (from Vanspor)
—	MF	ESP	Ale Meléndez (from Albacete)
—	DF	ESP	Álex Petxarroman (from Deportivo A Coruña, previously on loan at Andorra)
—	FW	MAR	Omar Sadik (on loan from Espanyol, previously on loan at Pau)
—	MF	ARM	Edgar Sevikyan (on loan from Ferencváros, previously on loan at Akron Tolyatti)
—	MF	ESP	Cedric Teguía (from Moreirense)

No.	Pos.	Nation	Player
—	DF	ESP	Aisar Ahmed (to Oviedo)
—	DF	ESP	Gonzalo Almenara (to Ibiza)
—	FW	USA	Konrad de la Fuente (loan return to Lausanne, later signed by Sporting Gijón)
—	MF	ESP	Rubén Díez (to Zaragoza)
—	DF	ESP	Diego González (to Zaragoza)
—	MF	MAR	Youness Lachhab (to Oviedo)
—	MF	ESP	Cristian Rodríguez (to Juventud Torremolinos)
—	MF	ARG	Ignacio Schor (to TBD)

=== Córdoba ===
Manager: Iván Ania (4th season)

In:

Out:

No.	Pos.	Nation	Player
20	DF	POR	Nélson Monte (on loan from Almería)
30	DF	ESP	Dani Budesca (on loan from Villarreal)
—	MF	ESP	Damián Cáceres (from Getafe B)
—	MF	MLI	Yussi Diarra (on loan from Cádiz)
—	MF	MAR	Salim El Jebari (from Atlético Madrid B, previously on loan at Mirandés)
—	GK	POR	Guilherme Fernandes (from Betis, previously on loan at Valladolid)
—	MF	ESP	Eder García (on loan from Bilbao Athletic)
—	MF	MAR	Adnane Ghailan (from Europa)
—	DF	ESP	Juan Gutiérrez (from Mirandés)
—	DF	ESP	Jacobo Martí (from Mérida)
—	DF	ESP	Egoitz Muñoz (on loan from Alavés B)
—	FW	ESP	Enol Rodríguez (from Huesca)
—	MF	ESP	Unai Sabroso (from Rayo Vallecano B)
—	FW	ESP	Ibai Sanz (on loan from Bilbao Athletic)
—	DF	ESP	Dani Tasende (from Zaragoza)

No.	Pos.	Nation	Player
2	DF	ESP	Ignasi Vilarrasa (to Burgos)
—	DF	ESP	Juan María Alcedo (to Torreense)
—	MF	ESP	Dalisson de Almeida (on loan to Hajduk Split)
—	MF	ESP	Alberto del Moral (loan return to Oviedo, later signed by Hajduk Split)
—	FW	ESP	Adrián Fuentes (to Mallorca)
—	MF	ESP	Jacobo González (to Oviedo)
—	MF	ESP	Mikel Goti (loan return to Real Sociedad, later loaned to Oviedo)
—	FW	ESP	Sergi Guardiola (retired)
—	GK	ESP	Carlos Marín (to Albacete)
—	MF	ESP	Pedro Ortiz (to Ibiza)
—	MF	ESP	Dani Requena (loan return to Villarreal, later loaned to Levante)
—	DF	ESP	Xavi Sintes (to TBD)

=== Eldense ===
Manager: Claudio Barragán (2nd year)

In:

Out:

No.	Pos.	Nation	Player
2	DF	ESP	Iker Recio (from Cádiz)
16	FW	ESP	Pau Cabanes (from Villarreal)
29	FW	POR	Dinis Rodrigues (on loan from Napoli)
—	FW	ESP	Mariano Carmona (on loan from Córdoba, previously on loan at Alcorcón)
—	MF	ESP	Jordi Martín (from Huesca)
—	MF	ESP	Javi Martínez (from Eibar)
—	FW	ESP	Manu Nieto (from Andorra)
—	GK	ESP	Juan Palomares (from Mirandés)
—	MF	ESP	Jorge Rastrojo (from Algeciras)
—	MF	CAN	Justin Smith (from Espanyol, previously on loan at Sporting Gijón)
—	MF	ESP	Rodri Val (from Atlético Sanluqueño)
—	DF	GER	Julien Yanda (on loan from Bayern Munich II)

No.	Pos.	Nation	Player
—	MF	MAR	Hamza Bellari (loan return to Valencia Mestalla, later signed by Castellón)
—	MF	MLT	Boston Billups (on loan to Cartagena)
—	DF	BIH	Dario Đumić (to TBD)
—	MF	ESP	Manu Molina (to TBD)
—	MF	ESP	Nacho Quintana (to Andorra)
—	MF	ESP	Rubén Quintanilla (loan return to Almería, later signed by Rayo Majadahonda)

=== Eibar ===
Manager: Jokin Aranbarri (1st year)

In:

Out:

No.	Pos.	Nation	Player
4	DF	ESP	Unai Elgezabal (from Levante)
—	DF	ESP	Imanol García de Albéniz (from Sparta Prague, previously on loan at Andorra)
—	MF	ESP	Iván Gil (from Las Palmas)
—	MF	ESP	Lucas Núñez (on loan from Valencia Mestalla)
—	MF	ESP	Francisco Pejiño (from Las Palmas)

No.	Pos.	Nation	Player
—	DF	ESP	Hodei Arrillaga (on loan to Mirandés)
—	MF	ESP	José Corpas (to Albacete)
—	MF	ESP	Javi Martínez (to Eldense)
—	DF	ESP	Marco Moreno (to Bahia)
—	MF	ESP	Toni Villa (to Cartagena)

=== Girona ===
Manager: Quique Álvarez (1st season)

In:

Out:

No.	Pos.	Nation	Player
4	DF	ESP	Javier Boñar (from Atlético Madrid)
23	MF	ESP	Carles Pérez (from Celta Vigo, previously on loan at Aris)
—	MF	POR	Jastin García (loan return from Andorra)
—	MF	ESP	Izan González (from Cornellà, previously on loan at Granada)
—	MF	ESP	Iván Morante (from Burgos)
—	GK	ESP	Sergi Puig (promoted from Girona B)
—	FW	UKR	Oleksandr Pyshchur (from Győri ETO)

No.	Pos.	Nation	Player
1	GK	ESP	Rubén Blanco (to Yokohama Marinos)
3	MF	ESP	Joel Roca (to Olympiacos)
4	DF	ESP	Arnau Martínez (to Valencia)
17	DF	NED	Daley Blind (to Ajax)
20	MF	BEL	Axel Witsel (to Nice)
—	GK	ESP	Juan Carlos (to TBD)
—	MF	FRA	Thomas Lemar (loan return to Atlético Madrid, later loaned to Elche)
—	MF	ESP	Iván Martín (to Racing Santander)
—	MF	KOR	Kim Min-su (to Rangers, previously on loan at Andorra)
—	MF	COL	Jhon Solís (to Birmingham City, previously on loan)
—	GK	GER	Marc-André ter Stegen (loan return to Barcelona, later loaned to Ajax)
—	FW	UKR	Viktor Tsyhankov (to Ajax)

=== Granada ===
Manager: Pacheta (3rd season)

In:

Out:

No.	Pos.	Nation	Player
1	GK	ESP	Alberto Flores (from Sevila)
—	MF	FRA	Kader Bamba (from Clermont Foot)
—	DF	GER	Benedikt Gimber (from 1. FC Heidenheim)
—	GK	ESP	Raúl Lizoain (from Albacete)
—	DF	ESP	Sergio López (from Darmstadt)
—	FW	VEN	Alejandro Marqués (from Estoril)
—	DF	ESP	Diego Pampín (from Levante)

No.	Pos.	Nation	Player
—	GK	ESP	Ander Astralaga (loan return to Barcelona, later signed by Atlético Madrileño)
—	FW	MAR	Mohamed Bouldini (loan return to Deportivo A Coruña, later signed by Académico de Viseu)
—	MF	ESP	Baba Diocou (loan return to Tenerife)
—	MF	ESP	Izan González (loan return to Cornellà, later signed by Girona)
—	FW	URU	Gonzalo Petit (loan return to Betis, later loaned to Cádiz)
—	MF	ESP	Sergio Ruiz (to Las Palmas)
—	MF	ESP	Pablo Sáenz (to Oviedo)
—	MF	ESP	Álex Sola (to Almería)
—	MF	ESP	Manu Trigueros (retired)

=== Las Palmas ===
Manager: Rubén de la Barrera (1st season)

In:

Out:

No.	Pos.	Nation	Player
21	DF	ITA	Giovanni Bonfanti (on loan from Atalanta, previously on loan at Spezia)
—	MF	SLO	Mateo Aćimović (from Olimpija Ljubljana)
—	FW	ESP	Jefté Betancor (from Olympiacos, previously on loan at Albacete)
—	DF	ESP	Andrés Rodríguez (from Teruel)
—	MF	ESP	Sergio Ruiz (from Granada)

No.	Pos.	Nation	Player
—	MF	ITA	Lorenzo Amatucci (loan return to Fiorentina, later signed by Deportivo A Coruña)
—	DF	ESP	Sergio Barcia (loan return to Legia Warsaw, later signed by Braga)
—	MF	COL	Nicolás Benedetti (to Deportivo Cali)
—	FW	ESP	Iker Bravo (loan return to Udinese, later signed by Watford)
—	MF	ESP	Iván Gil (to Eibar)
—	DF	ESP	Cristian Gutiérrez (on loan to Cádiz)
—	DF	ESP	Mika Mármol (to Feyenoord)
—	FW	ESP	Estanis Pedrola (loan return to Sampdoria, later sold to Oviedo)
—	MF	ESP	Francisco Pejiño (to Eibar)
—	MF	ESP	Jonathan Viera (to TBD)

=== Leganés ===
Manager: Rubén Albés (1st season)

In:

Out:

No.	Pos.	Nation	Player
1	GK	ESP	Raúl Fernández (from Alavés)
8	MF	MAR	Yassine Kechta (from Le Havre)
10	MF	NED	Zico Buurmeester (from AZ Alkmaar, previouly on loan at PEC Zwolle)
17	MF	TUN	Ismaël Gharbi (on loan from Braga, previouly on loan at Augsburg)
19	MF	CMR	Patrick Soko (on loan from Almería)
20	MF	ESP	Miguel Atienza (from Burgos)
21	FW	ESP	Álvaro Morata (on loan from Como)
23	DF	ESP	Álvaro Tejero (from Aris Thessaloniki)
—	FW	DEN	Alfred Gøthler (from Køge)

No.	Pos.	Nation	Player
—	MF	MLI	Seydouba Cissé (to Al-Kholood)
—	MF	ESP	Juan Cruz (on loan to Málaga)
—	MF	CPV	Duk (to Atlas)
—	FW	ESP	Miguel de la Fuente (to Almería, previously on loan)
—	FW	ESP	Diego García (to Malmö)
—	DF	ZAM	David Hamansenya (on loan to Slovan Liberec, previously on loan at Artis Brno)
—	DF	ESP	Jorge Sáenz (to Sporting Gijón)

=== Mallorca ===
Manager: Luis García (1st season)

In:

Out:

No.	Pos.	Nation	Player
1	GK	ESP	Arnau Tenas (on loan from Villarreal)
2	MF	ESP	Guille Fernández (from Barcelona)
15	DF	ESP	John Chetauya (on loan from Elche)
18	FW	POL	Adam Buksa (on loan from Udinese)
19	MF	ESP	Josep Cerdà (from Andorra)
—	FW	ESP	Adrián Fuentes (from Córdoba)
—	MF	ESP	Arnau Puigmal (from Almería)
—	MF	ESP	Antoniu Roca (on loan from Espanyol)
—	MF	ESP	Álex Sala (on loan from Lecce)
—	DF	FRA	Aboubaka Soumahoro (on loan from Hamburg, previously on loan at Saint-Étienne)

No.	Pos.	Nation	Player
—	FW	JPN	Takuma Asano (to Sanfrecce Hiroshima)
—	DF	ALB	Marash Kumbulla (loan return to Roma, later loaned to Rayo Vallecano)
—	FW	CAN	Cyle Larin (to Southampton, previously on loan)
—	MF	ESP	Javi Llabrés (to Burgos)
—	DF	ESP	Pablo Maffeo (to Olympiacos, later loaned to Valencia)
—	MF	GEQ	Omar Mascarell (to Al-Khaleej)
—	FW	KOS	Vedat Muriqi (to Fenerbahçe)
—	GK	ESP	Leo Román (to Deportivo A Coruña)
—	MF	ESP	Jan Virgili (to Club Brugge)

=== Oviedo ===
Manager: Julián Calero (1st season)

In:

Out:

No.	Pos.	Nation	Player
2	DF	ESP	Aisar Ahmed (from Ceuta)
3	DF	ESP	Juan Cruz (from Osasuna)
5	MF	MAR	Youness Lachhab (from Ceuta)
6	MF	ESP	Dani Villahermosa (from Andorra)
8	MF	ESP	Mikel Goti (on loan from Real Sociedad, previously on loan at Córdoba)
9	FW	ESP	Chris Ramos (on loan from Botafogo)
11	MF	ESP	Jacobo González (from Córdoba)
14	FW	ESP	Carlos Fernández (from Real Sociedad, previously on loan at Mirandés)
15	DF	ESP	Samu Rodríguez (from Alcorcón)
16	MF	ESP	Aritz Aldasoro (on loan from Racing Santander)
17	FW	ESP	Estanis Pedrola (from Sampdoria, previously on loan at Las Palmas)
18	FW	ESP	Víctor Mingo (from Arenteiro)
20	MF	ESP	Pablo Sáenz (from Granada)
23	DF	ESP	Carlos Domínguez (on loan from Celta Vigo)
24	FW	ROU	Alexandru Ișfan (from Farul Constanța)

No.	Pos.	Nation	Player
—	DF	ESP	Lucas Ahijado (to TBD)
—	DF	NIG	Rahim Alhassane (to Bologna)
—	DF	CIV	Eric Bailly (to Columbus Crew)
—	FW	URU	Thiago Borbas (loan return to Red Bull Bragantino, later loaned to Atlético Mineiro)
—	DF	ANG	David Carmo (loan return to Nottingham Forest, later loaned to Olympiacos)
—	MF	ESP	Santi Cazorla (retired)
—	MF	ARG	Santiago Colombatto (loan return to León, later TBD)
—	MF	BEL	Leander Dendoncker (to TBD)
—	MF	ENG	Ovie Ejaria (to TBD)
—	MF	ARG	Thiago Fernández (loan return to Villarreal, later loaned to Levante)
—	FW	ESP	Álex Forés (loan return to Villarreal, later sold to Burgos)
—	MF	EGY	Haissem Hassan (to Celtic)
—	DF	ESP	Javi López (loan return to Real Sociedad, later loaned to Feyenoord)
—	DF	ESP	Oier Luengo (to Burgos, previously on loan)
—	GK	ROU	Horațiu Moldovan (loan return to Atlético Madrid, later loaned to Eyüpspor)
—	FW	URU	Federico Viñas (loan return to León, later TBD)

=== Real Sociedad B ===
Manager: Ion Ansotegi (2nd season)

In:

Out:

No.	Pos.	Nation	Player
—	FW	ESP	Javier Soroeta (from Real Unión)

No.	Pos.	Nation	Player
—	GK	ESP	Egoitz Arana (to Sporting Gijón)
—	DF	ESP	Alberto Dadie (to Burgos)
—	FW	ESP	Jakes Gorosabel (to TBD)
—	MF	ESP	Mikel Rodríguez (to Alavés)

=== Sabadell ===
Manager: Ferran Costa (2nd season)

In:

Out:

No.	Pos.	Nation	Player
6	DF	ESP	Edgar González (on loan from Almería, previously on loan at Andorra)
29	MF	ITA	Patrick Nuamah (on loan from Sassuolo, previously on loan at Catanzaro)
—	DF	ESP	Pipa Ávila (from Ludogorets Razgrad)
—	FW	ESP	Ángel Baena (from Widzew Łódź)
—	DF	ESP	José Luis Catalá (from Espanyol B)
—	DF	ESP	Miki Codina (from Zamora)
—	MF	ESP	Pere Pons (from AEK Larnaca)
—	MF	FRA	Yanis Rahmani (from Cartagena)
—	MF	ESP	Alain Ribeiro (from Pontevedra)
—	MF	ESP	Óscar Sanz (from Gimnàstic Tarragona)

No.	Pos.	Nation	Player
—	DF	ESP	Carlos García-Die (to TBD)
—	MF	ESP	Rubén Martínez (retired)
—	MF	ESP	Jordi Ortega (to Olot)
—	GK	ESP	Nil Ruiz (to Europa)
—	DF	ESP	Sergi Segura (to TBD)
—	MF	ESP	Albert Tolosa (to Europa)

=== Sporting Gijón ===
Manager: (Argentina) Nicolás Larcamón (1st season)

In:

Out:

No.	Pos.	Nation	Player
17	FW	ESP	Antonio Casas (on loan from Venezia)
—	GK	ESP	Egoitz Arana (from Real Sociedad B)
—	DF	ESP	Andrés Cuenca (on loan from Como, previously sign from Barcelona)
—	FW	USA	Konrad de la Fuente (from Lausanne, previously on loan at Ceuta)
—	DF	ESP	Aimar Duñabeitia (from Bilbao Athletic)
—	MF	ESP	Hugo Guillamón (from Hajduk Split)
—	DF	URU	Emanuel Gularte (from Puebla, previously on loan at Peñarol Montevideo)
—	MF	RUS	Nikita Iosifov (from Celje)
—	DF	ESP	Jorge Sáenz (from Leganés)
—	FW	ARG	Alejo Sarco (from Bayer Leverkusen, previously on loan at Borussia Möenchengladbach)

No.	Pos.	Nation	Player
—	DF	ESP	Jesús Bernal (to Racing Ferrol)
—	FW	SEN	Amadou Coundoul (on loan to Académica Coimbra)
—	DF	ESP	Andrés Cuenca (loan return to Barcelona Atlètic, later signed by Como)
—	DF	ESP	Eric Curbelo (to TBD)
—	FW	BEL	Jonathan Dubasin (to Osasuna)
—	GK	CUB	Christian Joel (to União Leiria)
—	DF	ESP	Brian Oliván (to TBD)
—	DF	FRA	Lucas Perrin (to Nantes)
—	FW	ESP	Dani Queipo (to TBD)
—	MF	CAN	Justin Smith (loan return to Espanyol, later signed by Eldense)
—	DF	ESP	Kevin Vázquez (to TBD)

=== Tenerife ===
Manager: Álvaro Cervera (3rd season)

In:

Out:

No.	Pos.	Nation	Player
—	MF	ESP	Jesús Álvarez (from Huesca)
—	MF	ESP	Baba Diocou (loan return from Granada)
—	FW	SEN	Christian Gomis (on loan from Schalke 04)
—	MF	BIH	Anes Krdžalić (from Sarajevo)
—	FW	ARM	Grant-Leon Ranos (from Borussia Möenchengladbach, previously on loan at Eintracht Braunschweig)
—	DF	ESP	Jorge Moreno (from Cádiz)
—	MF	ESP	Víctor Moreno (from Villarreal B, previously on loan at Cultural Leonesa)
—	FW	SLO	Martin Pečar (from Bravo)
—	MF	ARG	Mauro Pittón (from Unión de Santa Fe)
—	FW	NED	Neal Viereck (on loan from Jong Utrecht)

No.	Pos.	Nation	Player
—	DF	ARG	Facundo Agüero (to TBD)
—	MF	ESP	Josep Calavera (on loan to Ibiza)
—	MF	ESP	Jeremy Jorge (on loan to Rayo Majadahonda)
—	MF	ESP	Maikel Mesa (to TBD)
—	MF	ESP	Javi Pérez (to TBD)
—	MF	ESP	Aitor Sanz (retired)
—	FW	URU	Gastón Valles (to TBD)

=== Valladolid ===
Manager: Fran Escribá (2nd season)

In:

Out:

No.	Pos.	Nation	Player
12	DF	ESP	Miguel Rubio (from Espanyol)
13	GK	ESP	Dani Martín (on loan from Levante, previously on loan at Huesca)
23	MF	ISR	Tai Abed (on loan from Levante)
—	MF	GEQ	Álex Balboa (from Lugo)
—	FW	ESP	Víctor Barberá (from Barcelona Atlètic)
—	MF	ESP	Yeray Cabanzón (from Racing Santander, previously on loan at Andorra)
—	MF	ESP	Luis Chacón (from Deportivo A Coruña, previously on loan at Cultural Leonesa)
—	MF	NED	Kaj de Rooij (from PEC Zwolle)
—	MF	ESP	Víctor Fernandez Jr. (on loan from Valencia Mestalla)
—	MF	ARG	Thiago Ojeda (from Villarreal, previously on loan at Cultural Leonesa)
—	MF	ESP	Dani Pérez (from Betis Deportivo)
—	FW	NED	Robin van Duiven (from Jong PSV, previously on loan at Lommel)

No.	Pos.	Nation	Player
—	FW	CRO	Stipe Biuk (to Widzew Łódź)
—	MF	ESP	Chuki (to Werder Bremen)
—	FW	NOR	Vegard Erlien (to Tromsø)
—	MF	DOM	Peter Federico (loan return to Getafe, later signed by Górnik Zabrze)
—	GK	POR	Guilherme Fernandes (loan return to Betis, later signed by Córdoba)
—	MF	ESP	Mario Maroto (to UD Logroñés)
—	MF	ESP	Víctor Meseguer (to Wisła Kraków)
—	DF	FRA	Clément Michelin (to Basel)

== See also ==
- 2026–27 La Liga
- 2026–27 Segunda División
