= 2026–27 Levante UD season =

Levante UD
2026–27 season
- President: Pablo Sánchez
- Head coach: Luís Castro
- Stadium: Estadi Ciutat de València
- La Liga: 17th
- Copa del Rey: First round

The 2026–27 season is the 118th season in the history of Levante UD, and the club's second consecutive season in La Liga. In addition to the domestic league, the club is also competing in the Copa del Rey. This season marks the club's second under head coach Luís Castro.

== Transfers ==
=== In ===
Pos.	Player	Transferred from	Fee	Date	Source
MF	(France) Enzo Bardeli	(France) USL Dunkerque	Free	1 July 2026	
DF	(Algeria) Aïssa Mandi	(France) Lille	Free	16 July 2026	
MF	(Spain) Hugo Sotelo	(Spain) Celta Vigo	Loan	20 July 2026	
FW	(Belgium) Yanis Musuayi	(Belgium) Club NXT	€3,000,000	2 August 2026	
MF	(Argentina) Thiago Fernández	(Spain) Villarreal	Loan	11 August 2026	
FW	(Austria) Ifeanyi Ndukwe	(England) Liverpool	Loan	22 August 2026	

== Friendlies ==
11 July 2026	Levante	2–1	Leganés
19:30

17 July 2026	Levante	1–2	Sheffield United
10:00

26 July 2026	Castellón	1–0	Al Qadsiah
10:00

1 August 2026	Levante	2–1	Albacete
10:00

5 August 2026	Villarreal	1–0	Levante
10:00

8 August 2026	Castellón	1–3	Levante
19:00

== Competitions ==
=== La Liga ===
==== League table ====
Pos	Team	Pld	W	D	L	GF	GA	GD	Pts	Qualification or relegation
15	Getafe	12	3	3	6	8	18	−10	12	
16	Osasuna	12	3	3	6	12	23	−11	12	
17	Levante	12	2	5	5	16	21	−5	11	
18	Elche	12	2	4	6	14	20	−6	10	Relegation to Segunda División
19	Valencia	12	2	3	7	8	20	−12	9	Relegation to Segunda División

Updated to match(es) played on 8 November 2026. Source: LaLiga EA Sports
Rules for classification: 1) Points; 2) Head-to-head points; 3) Head-to-head goal difference; 4) Goal difference; 5) Goals scored; 6) Fair-play points (if three or more teams tied); 7) Play-off at neutral site.
(Note: Head-to-head record is used only after all the matches between the teams in question have been played)

==== Results summary ====
Overall								Home						Away					
Pld	W	D	L	GF	GA	GD	Pts	W	D	L	GF	GA	GD	W	D	L	GF	GA	GD
12	2	5	5	16	21	−5	11	2	1	2	13	12	+1	0	4	3	3	9	−6

Last updated: 8 November 2026.
Source: La Liga

==== Results by round ====
Round	1	2	3	4	5	6	7	8	9	10	11	12
Ground	A	A	H	A	H	A	H	A	H	A	H	A
Result	L	D	W	D	L	L	D	D	W	L	L	D
Position	19	17	9	11								17

Updated to match(es) played on 8 November 2026. Source: La Liga
A = Away; H = Home; W = Win; D = Draw; L = Loss

==== Matches ====
16 August 2026 1	Espanyol	3–0	Levante	Cornellà de Llobregat
19:00 CEST (UTC+2)	Fernández 5', 40'; González (yellow card) 37'; Calatrava (yellow card) 63'; Hernández (yellow card) 68'; Dolan 80'	Report		Stadium: RCDE Stadium; Attendance: 28,050; Referee: Carlos Muñiz Muñoz

24 August 2026 2	Osasuna	0–0	Levante	Valencia
19:30 CEST (UTC+2)	Barja (yellow card) 88'; Herrera (yellow card) 90+1'	Report	Romero (yellow card) 38'	Stadium: Estadio Ciutat de València; Attendance: 20,241; Referee: Víctor García Verdura

29 August 2026 3	Levante	5–2	Real Betis	Valencia
17:00 CEST (UTC+2)	de la Fuente 24'; Bardeli 45+1'; Brugué 56', 70'; Toljan (yellow card) 86'; Olasagasti 90+5'	Report	Bartra 34'; Riquelme 45+4'; P. García (yellow card) 69'	Stadium: Ciutat de València; Attendance: 20,474; Referee: Ricardo de Burgos Bengoetxea

6 September 2026 4	Málaga	0–0	Levante	Málaga
18:30 CEST (UTC+2)	Chupete (penalty missed) 9'; Lorenzo (yellow card) 25'; Rafita (yellow card) 34'; Martínez (yellow card) 45+1'; Puga (yellow card) 90+2'	Report	Dela (yellow card) 70'; Mandi (yellow card) 90+5'	Stadium: La Rosaleda; Attendance: 29,264; Referee: Luís Bestard Servera

13 September 2026 5	Levante	2–4	Barcelona	Valencia
16:15 CEST (UTC+2)	Sotelo (yellow card) 45+5'; Romero 79'; Brugué 88'	Report	Espart 5'; Yamal 19', 48' (pen.); Martín (yellow card) 45+1'; Adeyemi 90+3'	Stadium: Ciutat de València; Attendance: 23,630; Referee: Jon Ander González Esteban

20 September 2026 7	Villarreal	3–1	Levante	Villarreal
18:30 CEST (UTC+2)	Pérez 41'; Moleiro 54'; Buchanan (yellow card) 79'; Mikautadze 86'	Report	Mandi (yellow card) 13'; Romero 42'	Stadium: Estadio de la Cerámica; Attendance: 18,671; Referee: Mateo Busquets Ferrer

12 October 2026 8	Levante	3–3	Sevilla	Valencia
21:00 CEST (UTC+2)	Iv. Romero 57'; Requena (yellow card) 76'; Dela (yellow card) 39', (goal) 90+2'; Ndukwe 90+10'	Report	Ure 13'; Correia (yellow card) 48', (goal) 54'; Castrín (yellow card) 63'; Alfon (yellow card) 84'; Is. Romero 90+5', (yellow card) 90+2' (yellow-red card) 90+6'; Iglesias (yellow card) 90+6'	Stadium: Ciutat de València; Attendance: 19,840; Referee: Adrián Cordero Vega

16 October 2026 9	Deportivo A Coruña	1–1	Levante	A Coruña
21:00 CEST (UTC+2)	Cruz (yellow card) 42'; Nsongo 63'; Altimira (yellow card) 90+6'; Giménez (yellow card) 90+7'	Report	Iv. Romero (yellow card) 33'; Requena 82'; Dela (yellow card) 89'	Stadium: Estadio Riazor; Attendance: 28,437; Referee: Roberto Tejero García

21 October 2026 10	Levante	3–1	Athletic Bilbao	Valencia
20:00 CEST (UTC+2)	Brugué 20', 22'; Mandi (yellow card) 66'; Eyong (yellow card) 77', (goal) 90+8'; Toljan (yellow card) 80'	Report	Berenguer 67' (pen.); Laporte (yellow card) 73' (red card); Berchiche (yellow card) 90+6'; Sannadi (yellow card) 90+10'	Stadium: Ciutat de València; Attendance: 18,779; Referee: Alejandro Quintero González

25 October 2026 11	Real Sociedad	2–1	Levante	San Sebastián
18:30 CET (UTC+1)	Óskarsson 6'; Turrientes 27'; Martín (yellow card) 64'	Report	Pérez 22'; Sánchez (yellow card) 75'; Musuayi (yellow card) 81'; García (yellow card) 87'	Stadium: Anoeta; Attendance: 30,035; Referee: Javier Alberola Rojas

31 October 2026 11	Levante	0–2	Atlético Madrid	Valencia
14:00 CET (UTC+1)		Report	Grimaldo 36'; Simeone 62'	Stadium: Ciutat de València; Attendance: 20,513; Referee: Ricardo de Burgos Bengoetxea

8 November 2026 12	Celta Vigo	0–0	Levante	Vigo
17:30 CET (UTC+1)	Galán (yellow card) 88'	Report	Requena (yellow card) 32'; Dela (yellow card) 63'	Stadium: Balaídos; Attendance: 19,207; Referee: Miguel Ángel Ortiz Arias
