= Joaquin Gonzalez =

Joaquin Gonzalez may refer to:

- Joaquín González (politician) (1853–1900), Filipino politician
- Joaquin Gonzalez (American football) (born 1979)
- Joaquín González (footballer) (born 2000), Spanish footballer
- Joaquín V. González (1863–1923), Argentine politician and academic
