= 2026–27 Rayo Vallecano season =

Spanish football club season

Rayo Vallecano
2026–27 season
- President: Raúl Martín Presa
- Head coach: Beñat San José
- Stadium: Vallecas
- La Liga: 12th
- Copa del Rey: First round
Home colours	Away colours	Third colours

The 2026–27 season is the 103rd season in the history of Rayo Vallecano, and the club's sixth consecutive season in La Liga. In addition to the domestic league, the club is participating in the Copa del Rey. The season covers the period from 1 July 2026 to 30 June 2027.

== Players ==
=== First-team squad ===
As of 3 September 2026

Note: Flags indicate national team as defined under FIFA eligibility rules; some limited exceptions apply. Players may hold more than one non-FIFA nationality.

No.	Pos.	Nation	Player
1	GK	ESP	Dani Cárdenas
2	DF	ROU	Andrei Rațiu
3	DF	ALB	Marash Kumbulla (on loan from Roma)
4	MF	ESP	Pedro Díaz
5	DF	ITA	Luiz Felipe
6	MF	SEN	Pathé Ciss
7	FW	ESP	Isi Palazón (vice-captain)
8	MF	ESP	Unai López
9	FW	BRA	Alemão
10	FW	ESP	Sergio Camello
11	FW	ANG	Randy Nteka
13	GK	ARG	Augusto Batalla
14	MF	GEO	Giorgi Tsitaishvili

No.	Pos.	Nation	Player
15	DF	ESP	Mujaid Sadick (on loan from Genk)
17	DF	ESP	Adrià Pedrosa (on loan from Sevilla)
18	MF	ESP	Álvaro García
19	FW	ESP	Jorge de Frutos
20	DF	ALB	Iván Balliu
21	FW	ESP	Fran Pérez
22	DF	ESP	Pelayo Fernández
23	MF	ESP	Óscar Valentín (captain)
24	DF	FRA	Florian Lejeune
25	GK	IDN	Emil Audero (on loan from Como)
33	DF	NED	Jozhua Vertrouwd
36	MF	ESP	Gnangoro Bouare
37	MF	ESP	Rayane Belaid

=== Other players under contract ===
Note: Flags indicate national team as defined under FIFA eligibility rules; some limited exceptions apply. Players may hold more than one non-FIFA nationality.

No.	Pos.	Nation	Player
—	FW	ESP	Raúl de Tomás

=== Out on loan ===
Note: Flags indicate national team as defined under FIFA eligibility rules; some limited exceptions apply. Players may hold more than one non-FIFA nationality.

No.	Pos.	Nation	Player
—	FW	CMR	Etienne Eto'o (at Racing Ferrol until 30 June 2027)

== Transfers ==
=== In ===
Pos.	Player	Transferred from	Fee	Date	Source
DF	(Senegal) Nobel Mendy	(Spain) Real Betis	Transfer	12 June 2026	
DF	(Albania) Marash Kumbulla	(Italy) AS Roma	Loan	7 August 2026	
MF	(Georgia (country)) Giorgi Tsitaishvili	(Ukraine) FC Dynamo Kyiv	Transfer	12 August 2026	
MF	(Spain) Gnangoro Bouare	(Spain) Betis Deportivo	Transfer	27 August 2026	
DF	(Spain) Adrià Pedrosa	(Spain) Sevilla	Loan	27 August 2026	
DF	(Spain) Mujaid Sadick	(Belgium) Genk	Loan	1 September 2026	
GK	(Indonesia) Emil Audero	(Italy) Como 1907	Loan	2 September 2026	
MF	(Spain) Rayane Belaid	(Spain) Atlético Madrid	Transfer	3 September 2026	

=== Out ===
Pos.	Player	Transferred to	Fee	Date	Source
DF	(Senegal) Nobel Mendy	(England) Hull City	Transfer	12 August 2026	
MF	(Spain) Pep Chavarría	(England) Chelsea F.C.	Transfer	12 August 2026	
DF	(Ghana) Abdul Mumin	(Spain) Girona FC	Free transfer	18 August 2026	
MF	(Cameroon) Etienne Eto'o	(Spain) Racing de Ferrol	Loan	1 September 2026	

== Competitions ==
=== La Liga ===
==== League table ====
Pos	Team	Pld	W	D	L	GF	GA	GD	Pts
12	Alavés	12	3	4	5	15	17	−2	13
13	Espanyol	12	3	3	6	13	14	−1	12
14	Rayo Vallecano	11	3	3	5	15	21	−6	12
15	Getafe	12	3	3	6	8	18	−10	12
16	Osasuna	12	3	3	6	12	23	−11	12

Updated to match(es) played on 8 November 2026. Source: LaLiga EA Sports
Rules for classification: 1) Points; 2) Head-to-head points; 3) Head-to-head goal difference; 4) Goal difference; 5) Goals scored; 6) Fair-play points (if three or more teams tied); 7) Play-off at neutral site.
(Note: Head-to-head record is used only after all the matches between the teams in question have been played)

==== Matches ====
15 August 2026 1	Sevilla	2–1	Rayo Vallecano	Seville
21:30 CEST (UTC+2)	Romero (yellow card) 45+3'; Guridi 52' (pen.), (yellow card) 60'; Suazo (yellow card) 81'; Salas (yellow card) 88' (red card); Peque 90+7' (pen.); Agoumé (yellow card) 90+12'	Report	García 4', (yellow card) 67'; López (yellow card) 75'; Pérez (yellow card) 76'; Alemão (yellow card) 90+12'	Stadium: Ramón Sánchez-Pizjuán; Attendance: 36,777; Referee: Ricardo de Burgos Bengoetxea

20 August 2026 2	Rayo Vallecano	1–1	Alavés	Puente de Vallecas
21:00 CEST (UTC+2)	Camello 48', (yellow card) 73'	Report	Tenaglia (yellow card) 45+2'; Mariano 84'; Valentini (yellow card) 90+2'	Stadium: Vallecas Stadium; Attendance: 4,280; Referee: José Munuera Montero

31 August 2026 3	Barcelona	5–2	Rayo Vallecano	Barcelona
21:30 CEST (UTC+2)	Raphinha 19', 71'; Yamal 21', 90'; Lejeune 51' (o.g.)	Report	Camello 12', 59'; Pedrosa (yellow card) 90'	Stadium: Camp Nou; Attendance: 57,768; Referee: Francisco José Hernández Maeso

5 September 2026 4	Rayo Vallecano	3–2	Racing de Santander	Leganés
18:30 CEST (UTC+2)	Valentini (yellow card) 2'; Rațiu 17'; Camello (yellow card) 39', (goal) 43', 47'; Lejeune (yellow card) 66'; Pérez (yellow card) 86' (red card); de Frutos (yellow card) 89' (red card)	Report	Canales 4'; Zabiri (yellow card) 25'; García 28'; Vicente (yellow card) 35'	Stadium: Butarque Stadium; Attendance: 4,529; Referee: Alejandro Quintero González

12 September 2026 5	Real Madrid	4–1	Rayo Vallecano	Madrid
21:00 CEST (UTC+2)	Mbappé 14' (pen.), 90+1'; Carreras 17'; Bellingham 35'	Report	Camello 51'; Ciss (yellow card) 76'	Stadium: Bernabéu; Attendance: 71,898; Referee: Víctor García Verdura

15 September 2026 6	Rayo Vallecano	2–1	Espanyol	Puente de Vallecas
19:00 CEST (UTC+2)	García 3'; Pedrosa 26'; López (yellow card) 45+2'; Tsitaishvili (yellow card) 67'; Ciss (yellow card) 70'; Bouare (yellow card) 80'; Alemão (yellow card) 90+1'	Report	R. Fernández 54'; M. Fernández (yellow card) 63'; El Hilali (yellow card) 90+8' (red card)	Stadium: Vallecas Stadium; Attendance: 3,742; Referee: Isidro Díaz de Mera

19 September 2026 7	Osasuna	1–1	Rayo Vallecano	Pamplona
21:00 CEST (UTC+2)	Budimir 16'; Osambela (yellow card) 21'; Moncayola (yellow card) 66'; Herrera (yellow card) 77'	Report	Ciss (yellow card) 24'; Camello 50'; Alemão (yellow card) 90+6'	Stadium: El Sadar; Attendance: 18,148; Referee: Manuel Jesús Orellana Cid

10 October 2026 8	Rayo Vallecano	Abandoned	Athletic Bilbao	Madrid
14:00 CEST (UTC+2)		Report		Stadium: Vallecas; Referee: José María Sánchez Martínez
Note: The match was called off by the referee in the 25th minute due to objects being thrown on the pitch by Rayo Vallecano fans.

19 October 2026 8	Getafe	1–1	Rayo Vallecano	Getafe
21:00 CEST (UTC+2)	Femenía (yellow card) 1'; Djené (yellow card) 16' (yellow-red card) 28'; Serrano (yellow card) 51'; Satriano 56'; Carvajal (yellow card) 79'; Ünal (yellow card) 84'; Gudelj (yellow card) 87'	Report	Á. García 11'; Balliu (yellow card) 45+1'; Ciss (yellow card) 69'; Camello (yellow card) 90+3'	Stadium: Coliseum; Attendance: 7,674; Referee: Jon Ander González Esteban

24 October 2026 10	Rayo Vallecano	0–3	Elche	Madrid
14:00 CEST (UTC+2)	Ciss (yellow card) 35', (penalty missed) 39'; Pedrosa (yellow card) 54'; García (yellow card) 81'	Report	Morcillo (yellow card) 10'; Redondo 23' (pen.), (yellow card) 30'; Villar (yellow card) 30'; Niño 36' (pen.); Valera 68'	Stadium: Vallecas; Attendance: 8,405; Referee: Miguel Sesma Espinosa

31 October 2026 10	Rayo Vallecano	3–0	Celta	Madrid
16:15 CET (UTC+1)	López (yellow card) 26', (goal) 73'; de Frutos 36', 55'; Bouare (yellow card) 72'	Report	Swedberg (yellow card) 82'	Stadium: Vallecas Stadium; Attendance: 11,714; Referee: Manuel Orellana Cid

8 November 2026 11	Real Sociedad	1–0	Rayo Vallecano	San Sebastián
15:15 CET (UTC+1)	Zubeldia (yellow card) 50'; Turrientes (yellow card) 61'; Óskarsson 67'	Report	Tsitaishvili (yellow card) 34'; Bouare (yellow card) 88'	Stadium: Anoeta Stadium; Attendance: 30,638; Referee: Juan Martínez Munuera

21 November 2026 12	Rayo Vallecano	v	Valencia CF

29 November 2026 13	Real Betis	v	Rayo Vallecano

6 December 2026 14	Rayo Vallecano	v	Levante UD

13 December 2026 15	Villarreal CF	v	Rayo Vallecano

20 December 2026 16	Rayo Vallecano	v	Málaga CF

3 January 2027 17	Rayo Vallecano	v	Atlético Madrid

10 January 2027 18	Deportivo de A Coruña	v	Rayo Vallecano

17 January 2027 19	Rayo Vallecano	v	Sevilla FC

24 January 2027 20	Elche CF	v	Rayo Vallecano

31 January 2027 21	Rayo Vallecano	v	Real Madrid CF

7 February 2027 22	RCD Espanyol	v	Rayo Vallecano

14 February 2027 23	RC Celta de Vigo	v	Rayo Vallecano

21 February 2027 24	Rayo Vallecano	v	Getafe CF

28 February 2027 25	Racing de Santander	v	Rayo Vallecano

7 March 2027 26	Rayo Vallecano	v	CA Osasuna

14 March 2027 27	Málaga CF	v	Rayo Vallecano

21 March 2027 28	FC Barcelona	v	Rayo Vallecano

4 April 2027 29	Levante UD	v	Rayo Vallecano

11 April 2027 30	Rayo Vallecano	v	Real Sociedad

18 April 2027 31	Deportivo Alavés	v	Rayo Vallecano

21 April 2027 32	Valencia CF	v	Rayo Vallecano

2 May 2027 33	Rayo Vallecano	v	Villarreal CF

9 May 2027 34	Rayo Vallecano	v	Deportivo de A Coruña

16 May 2027 35	Atlético Madrid	v	Rayo Vallecano

23 May 2027 36	Rayo Vallecano	v	Real Betis

30 May 2027 37	Athletic Bilbao	v	Rayo Vallecano

=== Copa del Rey ===
27 October 2026	Recreativo	2–3 (a.e.t.)	Rayo Vallecano	Huelva
21:00	Marín 23'; Romero 109' (pen.)	Report	Alemão 43' (pen.), 97'; De Frutos 99'	Stadium: Nuevo Colombino
