= Joaquín González (footballer) =

Spanish footballer

Personal information
- Full name: Joaquín Felipe González Rodríguez
- Date of birth: 14 October 2000 (age 26)
- Place of birth: Tegueste, Spain
- Height: 1.85 m (6 ft 1 in)
- Position: Midfielder

Team information
- Current team: Ceuta (on loan from Cádiz)

Youth career
- Alirón
- Juventud Laguna
- Alirón
- Acodetti

Senior career*
Years	Team	Apps	(Gls)
2019–2021	Guía		
2021–2022	Las Palmas C	39	(5)
2022–2023	Las Palmas B	21	(4)
2022	Las Palmas	0	(0)
2023–2024	Sanluqueño	32	(2)
2024–2025	Atlético Madrid B	28	(1)
2025–	Cádiz	14	(1)
2026–	→ Ceuta (loan)	0	(0)
- * Club domestic league appearances and goals as of 30 August 2026

Joaquín Felipe González Rodríguez (born 14 October 2000) is a Spanish professional footballer who plays as a midfielder for AD Ceuta FC, on loan from Cádiz CF.

== Career ==
Born in Tegueste, Tenerife, Canary Islands, González began his career with hometown club CD Alirón, and spent a year at CF Juventud Laguna before returning to his previous club. He finished his formation with Acodetti CF, before making his senior debut with UD Guía during the 2019–20 season, helping the club to achieve promotion from the Interinsular Preferente de Las Palmas.

On 2 February 2021, González signed for UD Las Palmas, being initially assigned to the C-team also in Tercera División RFEF. He subsequently started to feature with the reserves, before making his first team debut on 22 December 2022, starting in a 0–0 away draw (6–5 penalty loss) against CF La Nucía, for the campaign's Copa del Rey.

On 2 August 2023, González moved to Primera Federación side Atlético Sanluqueño CF. On 4 March of the following year, after establishing himself as a starter, he renewed his contract for a further year.

On 5 July 2024, González agreed to a two-year deal with another reserve team, Atlético Madrid B also in division three. On 14 June of the following year, he signed a five-year contract with Cádiz CF in Segunda División.

González made his professional debut on 9 November 2025, replacing Sergio Ortuño at half-time in a 0–0 home draw against Real Valladolid. He scored his first professional goal the following 27 April, netting the opener in a 2–1 home loss to UD Las Palmas.

On 1 September 2026, González moved to fellow second division side AD Ceuta FC on a one-year loan deal.

== Personal life ==
González's older brother Maceo is also a footballer and a midfielder. He too played for Guía.
