= Guilherme Fernandes =

Portuguese footballer (born 2001)

Personal information
- Full name: Guilherme Sousa Carvalho Fernandes
- Date of birth: 28 March 2001 (age 25)
- Place of birth: Lisbon, Portal
- Height: 1.91 m (6 ft 3 in)
- Position: Goalkeeper

Team information
- Current team: Córdoba
- Number: 13

Youth career
- 2010–2011: Nacional
- Marítimo
- 2013–2018: Sporting CP
- 2018–2019: Belenenses
- 2019–2021: Benfica

Senior career*
Years	Team	Apps	(Gls)
2021–2022	Amora	3	(0)
2022–2024	Estrela Amadora B	1	(0)
2023–2024	→ Betis B (loan)	18	(0)
2024–2026	Betis B	35	(0)
2025–2026	→ Valladolid (loan)	31	(0)
2026–	Córdoba	0	(0)
- * Club domestic league appearances and goals as of 31 May 2026

Guilherme Sousa Carvalho Fernandes (born 28 March 2001) is a Portuguese professional footballer who plays as a goalkeeper for Spanish club Córdoba CF.

== Club career ==
Born in Lisbon, Fernandes began his career with CD Nacional, and subsequently played for a local academy of AC Milan and CS Marítimo before joining Sporting CP in 2013. After a five-year spell with the Lions, he left for CF Os Belenenses, before signing a three-year contract with SL Benfica on 20 July 2019.

On 22 July 2021, Fernandes joined Liga 3 side Amora FC. He made his senior debut on 12 December, starting in a 1–0 home win over Vitória FC.

On 4 July 2022, Fernandes moved to CF Estrela da Amadora, but featured mainly for the under-23 squad and appeared once for the B-team. On 19 July 2023, he moved abroad and joined Spanish club Real Betis on a one-year loan deal, being initially assigned to the reserves in Segunda Federación.

On 5 July 2024, after helping Betis Deportivo to achieve promotion to Primera Federación, Estrela da Amadora announced Fernandes' permanent transfer to Betis; the Portuguese side still retained 50% of his economic rights. On 2 July of the following year, he extended his link with the Verdiblancos until 2027, and was loaned to Segunda División side Real Valladolid seven days later.

Fernandes made his professional debut on 15 August 2025, starting in a 3–0 home win over AD Ceuta FC. He was a regular starter for most of the season, featuring in 31 matches as the Blanquivioletas finished 17th.

On 20 July 2026, Fernandes agreed to a two-year contract with Córdoba CF also in the second division.

== Career statistics ==
As of match played 31 May 2026

Appearances and goals by club, season and competition
Club	Season	League			Cup		Europe		Other		Total	
Club	Season	Division	Apps	Goals	Apps	Goals	Apps	Goals	Apps	Goals	Apps	Goals
Amora	2021–22	Liga 3	3	0	0	0	—		0	0	3	0
Estrela Amadora B	2022–23	Segundo Nível Distrital	1	0	—		—		—		1	0
Betis B (loan)	2023–24	Segunda Federación	18	0	—		—		4 (Note: Appearances in 2024 Segunda Federación play-offs)	2	22	2
Betis B	2024–25	Primera Federación	35	0	—		—		—		35	0
Betis	2025–26	La Liga	0	0	0	0	—		—		0	0
Betis	2026–27	La Liga	0	0	0	0	0	0	—		0	0
Betis	Total		0	0	0	0	0	0	—		0	0
Valladolid (loan)	2025–26	Segunda División	31	0	0	0	—		—		31	0
Career total			88	0	0	0	0	0	4	2	92	2
