= Gnangoro Bouare =

Spanish footballer

Personal information
- Full name: Gnangoro Bouare Samake
- Date of birth: 13 June 2004 (age 22)
- Place of birth: Vícar, Spain
- Height: 1.84 m (6 ft 0 in)
- Position: Midfielder

Team information
- Current team: Rayo Vallecano
- Number: 36

Youth career
- 2012–2013: Vícar Cultural
- 2013–2014: La Mojonera
- 2014–2015: La Cañada Atlético
- 2015–2016: La Mojonera
- 2016–2017: Poli Aguadulce
- 2017–2018: Pavía
- 2018–2019: Poli Aguadulce
- 2019–2020: La Mojonera
- 2020–2021: Vícar Cultural
- 2021–2022: Poli Aguadulce
- 2022–2023: La Cañada Atlético

Senior career*
Years	Team	Apps	(Gls)
2021	Vícar Cultural	1	(0)
2023–2024	Berja	20	(1)
2024–2025	Poli El Ejido	20	(0)
2025	→ Sanluqueño (loan)	17	(0)
2025–2026	Betis B	30	(2)
2026–	Rayo Vallecano	5	(0)
- * Club domestic league appearances and goals as of 24 October 2026

Gnangoro Bouare Samake (born 13 June 2004) is a Spanish footballer who plays as a midfielder for Rayo Vallecano.

== Career ==
Born in Vícar, Almería, Andalusia to Malian parents, Bouare played for several local teams as a youth: CD Vícar Cultural, La Mojonera CF, UCD La Cañada Atlético, AD Polideportivo Aguadulce and UD Pavía. He made his senior debut with Vícar Cultural in 2021, and on 15 July 2023, after finishing his formation, he signed for Tercera Federación side CP El Ejido 1969.

Initially a member of reserve team Berja CF, Bouare renewed his link with Poli El Ejido in August 2024, and subsequently established himself as a starter before moving out on loan to Primera Federación side Atlético Sanluqueño CF on 24 January 2025. On 11 July, he agreed to a two-year deal with Real Betis, being assigned to the B-team also in the third division.

On 27 August 2026, Bouare moved straight to La Liga, signing a five-year contract with Rayo Vallecano. He made his professional debut four days later, starting in a 5–2 away loss to FC Barcelona.

== Career statistics ==
As of match played 24 October 2026

Appearances and goals by club, season and competition
Club	Season	League			Cup		Europe		Other		Total	
Club	Season	Division	Apps	Goals	Apps	Goals	Apps	Goals	Apps	Goals	Apps	Goals
Vícar Cultural	2021–22	Primera Andaluza	1	0	—		—		—		1	0
Berja	2023–24	División de Honor	20	1	—		—		—		20	1
Poli El Ejido	2024–25	Tercera Federación	20	0	—		—		—		20	0
Sanluqueño (loan)	2024–25	Primera Federación	17	0	—		—		—		17	0
Betis B	2025–26	Primera Federación	30	2	—		—		—		30	2
Rayo Vallecano	2026–27	La Liga	5	0	0	0	—		—		5	0
Career total			93	3	0	0	0	0	0	0	93	3
