= Dani Clavijo =

Spanish footballer

Personal information
- Full name: Daniel Clavijo Encinar
- Date of birth: 9 October 2003 (age 23)
- Place of birth: San Roque, Spain
- Position: Midfielder

Team information
- Current team: Antequera
- Number: 8

Youth career
- 2011–2016: San Roque
- 2016–2017: Málaga
- 2017–2018: San Félix
- 2018–2020: Málaga
- 2020–2021: Roda
- 2021–2022: Villarreal

Senior career*
Years	Team	Apps	(Gls)
2022–2023	Villarreal C	27	(3)
2023	Villarreal B	1	(0)
2023–2025	Granada B	45	(1)
2025–	Antequera	21	(0)
- * Club domestic league appearances and goals as of 10 June 2026

Daniel "Dani" Clavijo Encinar (born 9 October 2003) is a Spanish footballer who plays as a midfielder for Antequera.

== Club career ==
Born in San Roque, Cádiz, Andalusia, Clavijo joined Villarreal CF's youth setup on 24 June 2020, after representing Málaga CF (including their affiliate side CD San Félix) and hometown side CD San Roque. He spent his first season with affiliate club CD Roda, and on 9 February 2022, while still a youth, he renewed his contract with the Yellow Submarine for "several years".

Clavijo made his senior debut with the C-team on 11 September 2022, starting in a 0–0 Tercera Federación away draw against Elche CF Ilicitano. He scored his first senior goals on 27 November, netting a brace for the C's in a 3–2 home win over Athletic Club Torrellano.

Clavijo made his professional debut with the reserves on 27 May 2023, starting in a 4–3 away loss against FC Andorra in the Segunda División. On 15 August, he moved to another reserve team, Club Recreativo Granada in Primera Federación.
