= Aisar Ahmed =

Spanish footballer

Personal information
- Full name: Aisar Ahmed Ahmed
- Date of birth: 2 July 2001 (age 25)
- Place of birth: Ceuta, Spain
- Height: 1.78 m (5 ft 10 in)
- Position: Attacking midfielder

Team information
- Current team: Oviedo

Youth career
- Puerto Ceuta
- 2014–2017: Betis
- 2017–2019: Sporting Ceuta
- 2019–2020: Levante

Senior career*
Years	Team	Apps	(Gls)
2020–2026	Ceuta	165	(10)
2026–	Oviedo	0	(0)
- * Club domestic league appearances and goals as of 9 June 2026

Aisar Ahmed Ahmed (born 2 July 2001), sometimes known as just Aisar, is a Spanish professional footballer who plays for Real Oviedo. Mainly an attacking midfielder, he can also play as a right-back or a right winger.

== Career ==
=== Early career ===
Born in Ceuta, Aisar played for hometown side CD Puerto Ceuta before joining Real Betis' youth sides in June 2014, after signing a three-year contract. He left the latter in 2017 to return to his hometown with Club Sporting de Ceuta, but joined Levante UD on 25 August 2019.

=== Ceuta ===
On 19 September 2020, after finishing his formation, Aisar was announced at Tercera División side AD Ceuta FC. He made his senior debut on 1 November, coming on as a late substitute in a 2–1 away win over UD Los Barrios, and finished the season with one goal in 21 appearances as the club achieved promotion to Segunda División RFEF.

Aisar continued to feature regularly in the following years, helping in the Caballas' consecutive promotion to Primera Federación, and signed a new contract with the club until 2026 on 11 August 2023. During the 2023–24 campaign, he also started to feature as a right-back, and reached 100 matches for Ceuta on 5 May 2024, scoring in a 2–0 home win over Antequera CF.

Still a regular starter during the 2024–25 season, Aisar contributed with two goals in 33 appearances overall as Ceuta achieved promotion to Segunda División, although he missed out the latter matches of the campaign due to an injury. He made his professional debut on 23 August 2025, starting in a 1–0 home loss to Sporting de Gijón.

Despite being regularly used during the 2025–26 campaign, Aisar reached an agreement to terminate his contract with Ceuta on 9 June 2026.

=== Oviedo ===
On 16 June 2026, Aisar was announced at Real Oviedo on a two-year deal.
