= Bruno Iribarne =

Spanish footballer

Personal information
- Full name: Bruno Iribarne Alemán
- Date of birth: 18 August 2004 (age 22)
- Place of birth: Aguadulce, Spain
- Height: 1.91 m (6 ft 3 in)
- Position: Goalkeeper

Team information
- Current team: Burgos
- Number: 1

Youth career
- Parador
- 2010–2014: Ciudad de Roquetas
- 2014–2016: Marinas Urbanización
- 2016–2017: Málaga
- 2017–2018: Almería
- 2018–2022: Real Madrid
- 2022–2023: Almería

Senior career*
Years	Team	Apps	(Gls)
2023–2025	Almería B	44	(0)
2024–2026	Almería	0	(0)
2026–	Burgos	0	(0)

International career^{‡}
2019–2020	Spain U16	4	(0)
2023	Spain U19	5	(0)
2025–	Spain U21	1	(0)
- * Club domestic league appearances and goals as of 19 April 2025 ‡ National team caps and goals as of 9 October 2025

Bruno Iribarne Alemán (born 18 August 2004), sometimes known as just Bruno, is a Spanish professional footballer who plays as a goalkeeper for Burgos CF.

== Club career ==
=== Early career ===
Born in Aguadulce, Roquetas de Mar, Almería, Andalusia, Iribarne began his career with hometown side AD Parador as a forward. After his teammate got injured, he replaced him as a goalkeeper, and did not leave the position ever since.

Iribarne subsequently represented UD Ciudad de Roquetas, AD Marinas Urbanización, Málaga CF and UD Almería as a youth, before joining Real Madrid's La Fábrica in 2018. Released by the latter club in 2022, he returned to Almería, helping the Juvenil side to reach the final of the 2023 Copa del Rey Juvenil.

=== Almería ===
Promoted to the reserves ahead of the 2023–24 season, Iribarne made his senior debut on 10 September 2023, starting in a 0–0 Tercera Federación away draw against Atlético Malagueño. He started to train with the main squad in April 2024, and remained a starter with the B's as they achieved promotion to Segunda Federación.

Iribarne made his first team debut on 30 October 2024, starting in a 2–1 away win over UD San Sebastián de los Reyes, for the campaign's Copa del Rey; he became the first goalkeeper born in the province to debut for the club in nearly 20 years, after Ricardo Molina's debut in 2005. On 30 June of the following year, he renewed his contract with the club until 2029.

=== Burgos ===
On 15 August 2026, after being a third-choice behind veterans Andrés Fernández and Fernando Martínez, Iribarne joined fellow Segunda División side Burgos CF on a four-year deal.

== International career ==
Iribarne represented Spain at under-16 and under-19 levels, playing in the 2023 UEFA European Under-19 Championship with the latter side.

== Personal life ==
Iribarne's grandfather Pedro was also a footballer. A centre-back, he notably represented Club Hispania de Almería and Guadix CF in the 1960s.
