= Baba Diocou =

Spanish footballer (born 2005)

Personal information
- Full name: Babacar Diocou Ndiaye
- Date of birth: 10 June 2005 (age 21)
- Place of birth: Fassada, Senegal
- Height: 1.74 m (5 ft 9 in)
- Position: Winger

Team information
- Current team: Tenerife

Youth career
- 2016–2017: Complutense
- 2017–2024: Real Madrid

Senior career*
Years	Team	Apps	(Gls)
2024–2025	Real Madrid C	14	(1)
2025	Real Madrid B	4	(0)
2025–	Tenerife	0	(0)
2025–2026	→ Arenas (loan)	18	(5)
2026	→ Granada (loan)	12	(1)
- * Club domestic league appearances and goals as of 9 June 2026

Babacar "Baba" Diocou Ndiaye (born 10 June 2005) is a footballer who plays as a winger for Spanish club CD Tenerife. Born in Senegal, he has been called up to represent Spain internationally at youth level.

== Early life ==
Diocou was born in Fassada, Sédhiou department, and moved to Spain in 2015. The younger brother of Spanish handball player Mamadou Diocou, he lived with his stepmother, father, and siblings.

== Club career ==
Diocou joined the youth academy of Spanish side AD Complutense in 2016, before moving to Real Madrid's La Fábrica in the following year. In 2024, after finishing his formation, he was promoted to the C-team in Segunda Federación.

Diocou made his senior debut on 1 September 2024, coming on as a second-half substitute for Pol Fortuny in a 3–3 home draw against CD Coria. He first appearing with the reserves on 11 January of the following year, in a 2–0 Primera Federación home win over CD Alcoyano, before scoring his first goal on 16 February, netting the C's opener in a 1–1 home draw against CD Atlético Paso.

In August 2025, Diocou signed a contract with third division side CD Tenerife, and was immediately loaned out to fellow league team Arenas Club de Getxo for the 2025–26 season. He scored three goals in his first three matches for the club, and remained an undisputed starter afterwards.

Diocou left Arenas on 23 January 2026, and moved to Segunda División side Granada CF just hours later, also on loan with a buyout clause.

== International career ==
On 29 September 2021, Diocou was called up to the Spain national under-17 team for two friendlies against the Netherlands.

== Style of play ==
Diocou plays as a winger and is right-footed. Spanish newspaper El Español wrote in 2018 that he "is characterized by his physical strength, the way he uses his body to win balls... his outside kicking is one of his strong points".
