= Ifeanyi Ndukwe =

Austrian footballer (born 2008)

Personal information
- Full name: Ifeanyi Arthur Ndukwe
- Date of birth: 3 March 2008 (age 18)
- Place of birth: Vienna, Austria
- Height: 1.98 m (6 ft 6 in)
- Position: Centre-back

Team information
- Current team: Levante (on loan from Liverpool)
- Number: 3

Youth career
- 2013–2016: WAF Brigittenau
- 2016–2025: Austria Wien

Senior career*
Years	Team	Apps	(Gls)
2025–2026	Austria Wien II	26	(1)
2026	Austria Wien	1	(0)
2026–	Liverpool	0	(0)
2026–	→ Levante (loan)	8	(1)

International career^{‡}
2024–2025	Austria U17	15	(1)
2026–	Austria U18	2	(0)
2024–	Austria U19	4	(0)
- * Club domestic league appearances and goals as of 20:00, 8 November 2026 (UTC) ‡ National team caps and goals as of 6 October 2026

Ifeanyi Arthur Ndukwe (born 3 March 2008) is an Austrian professional footballer who plays as a centre-back for La Liga club Levante, on loan from Premier League club Liverpool.

== Early life ==
Ndukwe was born in Vienna to an Igbo Nigerian father and a Russian mother. His elder brother, Obinna Ndukwe, is a basketball player.

== Club career ==
Ndukwe started his career at WAF Brigittenau before joining the academy of Austria Wien in 2016. He captained Austria Wien at under-16 level, prior to being a regular starter for Austria Wien II in the 2024–25 season, when they secured promotion to the 2. Liga. He signed a three-year professional contract with the club in June 2025.

On 26 January 2026, Ndukwe officially agreed to join Premier League club Liverpool, with the transfer package to be finalised in the summer of 2026, once he became eligible upon turning 18. The deal is valued at an initial £2.6 million (€3 million), with additional performance-related add-ons potentially increasing the total fee. At the end of the 2025–26 season, Ndukwe made his senior debut for Austria Wien, coming on as a substitute in a 2–0 league win over Rapid Wien - the Vienna derby - at the Allianz Stadion.

On 22 August 2026, Ndukwe's move to Liverpool was confirmed, and he immediately joined La Liga club Levante on loan. He made his Levante debut in a 4–2 league defeat to Barcelona at Estadi Ciutat de València on 13 September 2026. The following month, he scored his first goal for the club - and the first goal of his senior career - with an injury-time equaliser in a 3-3 league draw against Sevilla on 12 October 2026.

== International career ==
Ndukwe was a member of the Austria national under-17 football team which reached the final of the 2025 FIFA U-17 World Cup in Qatar in November 2025.

== Career statistics ==
=== Club ===
As of match played 8 November 2026

Appearances and goals by club, season and competition
Club	Season	League			National cup		League cup		Other		Total	
Club	Season	Division	Apps	Goals	Apps	Goals	Apps	Goals	Apps	Goals	Apps	Goals
Austria Wien	2025–26	Austrian Bundesliga	1	0	0	0	0	0	0	0	1	0
Liverpool	2026–27	Premier League	0	0	0	0	0	0	0	0	0	0
Levante (loan)	2026–27	La Liga	8	1	0	0	0	0	0	0	8	1
Career total			9	1	0	0	0	0	0	0	9	1
