= Youness Lachhab =

Moroccan footballer (born 1998)

Personal information
- Full name: Youness Lachhab Didi
- Date of birth: 23 April 1999 (age 27)
- Place of birth: El Palmar, Spain
- Height: 1.92 m (6 ft 4 in)
- Position: Midfielder

Team information
- Current team: Oviedo

Youth career
- 2011–2017: Murcia
- 2018: Almería

Senior career*
Years	Team	Apps	(Gls)
2017–2018	Murcia B	17	(1)
2018–2020	Almería B	40	(0)
2020	→ Al-Kawkab (loan)	3	(0)
2020–2021	Murcia	20	(0)
2021–2023	Granada B	55	(2)
2023–2025	Eldense	22	(1)
2025–2026	Ceuta	52	(3)
2026–	Oviedo	0	(0)

International career
2018	Morocco U20	1	(0)
- * Club domestic league appearances and goals as of 31 May 2026

Youness Lachhab Didi (born 23 April 1999) is a Moroccan footballer who plays as a midfielder for Segunda División club Real Oviedo.

== Club career ==
Born in El Palmar, Region of Murcia to Moroccan parents, Lachhab was a Real Murcia youth graduate. He made his senior debut with the reserves on 9 April 2017, playing the last 13 minutes in a 0–0 Tercera División away draw against El Palmar CF.

Lachhab scored his first senior goal on 10 September 2017, netting the B's second in a 3–2 home loss to Lorca FC B. In January of the following year, he moved to UD Almería and returned to the youth setup.

On 18 June 2020, after two seasons with Almería's B-team, Lachhab returned to Murcia and was assigned to the main squad in Segunda División B. On 26 August 2021, he moved to another reserve team, Club Recreativo Granada in Segunda División RFEF.

On 14 July 2023, Lachhab signed a two-year contract with CD Eldense, newly promoted to Segunda División. He made his professional debut on 13 August, coming on as a second-half substitute for David Timor in a 1–0 away win over FC Cartagena.

Lacchab scored his first professional goal on 23 October 2024, netting his side's second in a 3–2 home loss to Real Zaragoza. The following 17 January, he was transferred to Primera Federación side AD Ceuta FC.

Lacchab helped the Caballas to achieve a promotion to the second division, and subsequently established himself as a regular starter for the club. On 2 June 2026, he signed a two-year contract with Real Oviedo, recently relegated to division two.
