= Izan González =

Spanish footballer (born 2004)

Personal information
- Full name: Izan González Muñoz
- Date of birth: 5 November 2004 (age 21)
- Place of birth: Blanes, Spain
- Height: 1.70 m (5 ft 7 in)
- Position: Midfielder

Team information
- Current team: Girona
- Number: 24

Youth career
- Cal La Guidó
- Costa Brava
- 2022–2023: Cornellà

Senior career*
Years	Team	Apps	(Gls)
2022	Costa Brava B	1	(0)
2023–2026	Cornellà	31	(1)
2023–2024	→ L'Escala (loan)	31	(2)
2025–2026	→ Europa (loan)	21	(0)
2026	→ Granada (loan)	18	(1)
2026–	Girona	11	(1)
- * Club domestic league appearances and goals as of 24 October 2026

Izan González Muñoz (born 5 November 2004) is a Spanish professional footballer who plays as a midfielder for Girona FC.

== Club career ==
Born in Blanes, Girona, Catalonia, González played for AD Cal La Guidó and UE Costa Brava joining UE Cornellà's youth sides in 2022. On 18 July 2023, after finishing his formation, he was loaned to Tercera Federación side FC L'Escala, for one year.

Back to Cornellà in July 2024, González was a regular starter in Segunda Federación as the club suffered relegation. On 7 August 2025, he renewed his contract until 2027, and was immediately loaned to Primera Federación side CE Europa for the campaign.

An immediate starter at the Escapulats, González's performances attracted the interest of RCD Espanyol, FC Barcelona and Girona FC. On 26 January 2026, Cornellà terminated his loan, and he was announced at Segunda División side Granada CF also in a temporary deal two days later.

González made his professional debut on 1 February 2026, coming on as a late substitute for Pedro Alemañ in a 1–0 home win over Racing de Santander. Thirteen days later, he was handed his first start and scored the opener in a 5–1 home routing of Real Valladolid, and subsequently established himself as a regular starter.

On 16 June 2026, González signed a three-year contract with Girona FC, recently relegated to division two.

== International career ==
On 5 December 2023, González was called up to the Catalonia national amateur team for the Spanish stage of the 2025 UEFA Regions' Cup.

== Career statistics ==
As of match played 27 October 2026

Appearances and goals by club, season and competition
Club	Season	League			Cup		Other		Total	
Club	Season	Division	Apps	Goals	Apps	Goals	Apps	Goals	Apps	Goals
Costa Brava B	2021–22	Primera Catalana	1	0	—		—		1	0
Cornellà	2023–24	Primera Federación	0	0	—		—		0	0
Cornellà	2024–25	Segunda Federación	31	1	—		—		31	1
Cornellà	Total		31	1	—		—		31	1
L'Escala (loan)	2023–24	Tercera Federación	31	2	—		—		31	2
Europa (loan)	2025–26	Primera Federación	21	0	1	0	—		22	0
Granada (loan)	2025–26	Segunda División	18	1	—		—		18	1
Girona	2026–27	Segunda División	11	1	1	0	—		12	1
Career total			113	5	2	0	0	0	115	5
