= Dani Requena =

Spanish footballer

Personal information
- Full name: Daniel Requena Sánchez
- Date of birth: 12 February 2004 (age 22)
- Place of birth: Cenes de la Vega, Spain
- Height: 1.86 m (6 ft 1 in)
- Position: Midfielder

Team information
- Current team: Levante (on loan from Villarreal)

Youth career
- 2008–2013: Sierra Nevada Cenes
- 2013–2016: Granada
- 2016–2021: Villarreal
- 2021–2022: Roda
- 2022–2023: Villarreal

Senior career*
Years	Team	Apps	(Gls)
2022–2023	Villarreal C	6	(0)
2023–2025	Villarreal B	67	(3)
2025–	Villarreal	1	(0)
2025–2026	→ Córdoba (loan)	36	(2)
2026–	→ Levante (loan)	0	(0)

International career^{‡}
2022	Spain U19	3	(1)
2026–	Spain U21	2	(0)
- * Club domestic league appearances and goals as of 6 June 2026 ‡ National team caps and goals as of 31 March 2026

Daniel "Dani" Requena Sánchez (born 12 February 2004) is a Spanish footballer who plays as a midfielder for Levante UD, on loan from Villarreal CF.

== Club career ==
Born in Cenes de la Vega, Granada, Andalusia, Requena joined Villarreal CF's youth setup in 2016, after representing Granada CF and hometown side CF Sierra Nevada Cenes. He made his senior debut with the former's C-team on 28 October 2022, coming on as a second-half substitute in a 1–1 Tercera Federación home draw against Atlético Levante UD.

On 4 January 2023, Requena renewed his contract with the Yellow Submarine until 2026. He made his professional debut with the reserves on 27 May, replacing fellow debutant Dani Clavijo late into a 4–3 away loss against FC Andorra in the Segunda División.

Requena scored his first professional goal on 30 September 2023, netting the B's equalizer in a 2–2 home draw against AD Alcorcón. On 25 May 2025, he made his first-team debut on the last day of the 2024-25 season in a 4–2 win against Sevilla FC, replacing Denis Suárez in the 81th minute.

On 22 July 2025, Requena was loaned to Córdoba CF in the second division, for one year. Roughly one year later, he moved to Levante UD in the top tier also in a temporary deal.

== International career ==
On 23 August 2022, Requena was called up to the Spain national under-19 team for two friendlies against Israel. He featured in both matches (0–0 draw and 2–0 win), scoring in the second.

== Career statistics ==
=== Club ===
As of match played 25 May 2025

Appearances and goals by club, season and competition
Club	Season	League			Cup		Europe		Total	
Club	Season	Division	Apps	Goals	Apps	Goals	Apps	Goals	Apps	Goals
Villarreal C	2022–23	Tercera Federación	6	0	—		—		6	0
Villarreal B	2022–23	Segunda División	1	0	—		—		1	0
Villarreal B	2023–24	Segunda División	38	1	—		—		38	1
Villarreal B	2024–25	Primera Federación	28	2	—		—		28	2
Villarreal B	Total		67	3	—		—		67	3
Villarreal	2024–25	La Liga	1	0	—		—		1	0
Career total			74	3	0	0	0	0	74	3
