= Rayane Belaid =

Spanish footballer (born 2005)

Personal information
- Full name: Rayane Belaid Khelil
- Date of birth: 11 February 2005 (age 21)
- Place of birth: Orihuela, Spain
- Height: 1.72 m (5 ft 8 in)
- Position: Attacking midfielder

Team information
- Current team: Rayo Vallecano
- Number: 37

Youth career
- Elche
- 2016–2024: Atlético Madrid

Senior career*
Years	Team	Apps	(Gls)
2024–2026	Atlético Madrid B	68	(11)
2026	Atlético Madrid	2	(0)
2026–	Rayo Vallecano	1	(0)

International career^{‡}
2021	Algeria U18	1	(0)
2023–2024	Spain U19	11	(1)
2025	Spain U20	7	(1)
Medal record
Men's football
Representing Spain
UEFA European Under-19 Championship
Winner	2024 Northern Ireland
- * Club domestic league appearances and goals as of 12 September 2026 ‡ National team caps and goals as of 21:50, 11 October 2025 (UTC)

Rayane Belaid Khelil (Arabic: ريان بلعيد; born 11 February 2005) is a footballer who plays as an attacking midfielder for Rayo Vallecano. Born in Spain, he has represented both that nation and Algeria at youth international levels.

== Early life ==
Belaid was born in Orihuela, Alicante, and joined the youth sides of Atlético Madrid in 2016 from Elche CF. He impressed with the under-19s in the 2023–24 UEFA Youth League, scoring four goals in six appearances.

== Club career ==
Belaid debuted for the Atleti's reserves on 10 March 2024, coming on as a late substitute in a 1–1 Primera Federación away draw with Recreativo de Huelva. He quickly became a regular starter under Fernando Torres during the 2024–25 season, and attracted interest from Premier League teams.

On 2 March 2026, Belaid renewed his contract with Atlético until 2029. He made his first team – and La Liga – debut on 11 April 2026, starting in a 2–1 away loss to Sevilla FC.

On 3 September 2026, Belaid was announced at fellow top tier side Rayo Vallecano on a five-year deal.

== International career ==
Belaid has represented Spain internationally at youth level. He is also eligible to represent Algeria and France through his parents.

== Style of play ==
Belaid mainly operates as a midfielder. He is known for his dribbling ability.

== Career statistics ==
As of match played 12 September 2026

Appearances and goals by club, season and competition
Club	Season	League			Cup		Europe		Other		Total	
Club	Season	Division	Apps	Goals	Apps	Goals	Apps	Goals	Apps	Goals	Apps	Goals
Atlético Madrid B	2023–24	Primera Federación	4	0	—		—		—		4	0
Atlético Madrid B	2024–25	Primera Federación	35	6	—		—		—		35	6
Atlético Madrid B	2025–26	Primera Federación	29	4	—		—		2 (Note: Appearances in 2026 Primera Federación play-offs)	0	31	4
Atlético Madrid B	Total		68	10	—		—		2	0	70	10
Atlético Madrid	2025–26	La Liga	2	0	0	0	0	0	—		2	0
Rayo Vallecano	2026–27	La Liga	1	0	0	0	—		—		1	0
Career total			71	10	0	0	0	0	2	0	73	10

== Honours ==
Spain U19

- UEFA European Under-19 Championship: 2024
