= Samu Rodríguez =

Spanish footballer

Personal information
- Full name: Samuel Rodríguez de la Riva
- Date of birth: 8 December 2004 (age 21)
- Place of birth: Madrid, Spain
- Height: 1.82 m (6 ft 0 in)
- Position: Left-back

Team information
- Current team: Oviedo
- Number: 15

Youth career
- 2019–2021: Alcorcón
- 2021–2022: Talavera
- 2022–2023: Fuenlabrada

Senior career*
Years	Team	Apps	(Gls)
2023–2024	Fuenlabrada Promesas	23	(2)
2024	Fuenlabrada	7	(0)
2024	Alcorcón B	7	(1)
2024–2026	Alcorcón	60	(2)
2026–	Oviedo	1	(0)
- * Club domestic league appearances and goals as of 15 August 2026

Samuel "Samu" Rodríguez de la Riva (born 8 December 2004) is a Spanish professional footballer who plays as a left-back for Real Oviedo.

== Career ==
Born in Madrid, Rodríguez played for AD Alcorcón, CF Talavera de la Reina and CF Fuenlabrada as a youth. After making his senior debut with the latter's reserves in the Preferente de Madrid, he made his first team debut on 11 February 2024, starting in a 3–1 Primera Federación home win over Sestao River Club.

In July 2024, after seven first team appearances for Fuenla, Rodríguez moved to neighbouring AD Alcorcón and was initially assigned to the reserves in Tercera Federación. He made his first team debut for the side in November, and subsequently went on to establish himself as a first-choice.

On 2 July 2026, Rodríguez signed a three-year contract with Real Oviedo, freshly relegated to Segunda División, for a rumoured fee of around € 450,000. He made his professional debut on 15 August, starting in a 0–0 home draw against Granada CF.
