= Enzo Bardeli =

French association football player (born 2001)

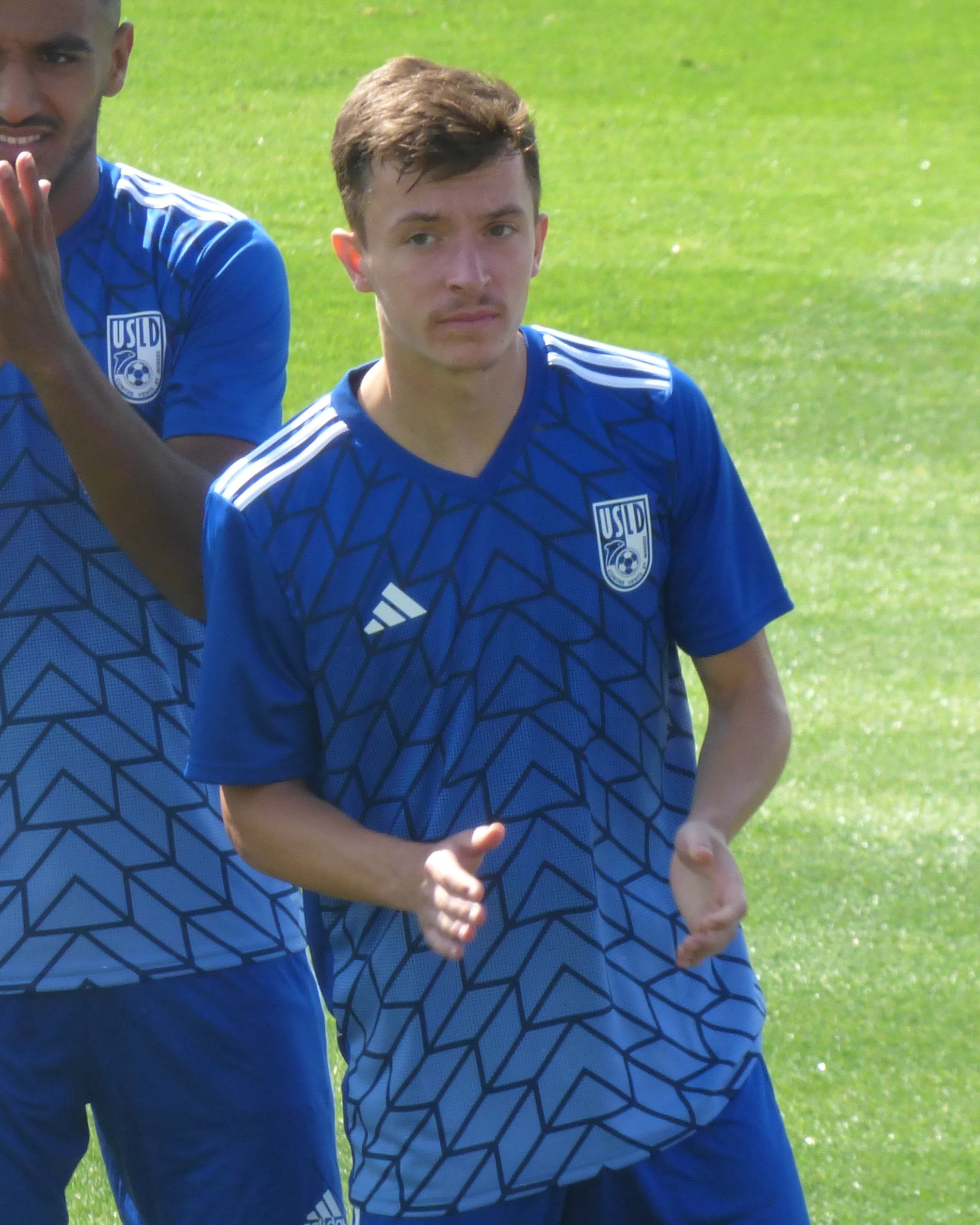
- Bardeli with Dunkerque in 2023

Personal information
- Date of birth: 11 April 2001 (age 25)
- Place of birth: Dunkirk, France
- Height: 1.72 m (5 ft 8 in)
- Position: Midfielder

Team information
- Current team: Levante
- Number: 18

Youth career
- Coudekerque-Branche
- 2011–2019: Lille

Senior career*
Years	Team	Apps	(Gls)
2019–2021	Lille B	3	(0)
2021–2026	Dunkerque	139	(19)
2026–	Levante	8	(1)
- * Club domestic league appearances and goals as of 16 October 2026

Enzo Bardeli (born 11 April 2001) is a French professional footballer who plays as a midfielder for La Liga club Levante.

== Career ==
A youth product of Lille since the age of 10, Bardeli began his senior team with their reserves. He transferred to Dunkerque in 2021, signing his first professional contract on 2 March 2022. He made his professional debut with Dunkerque in a 3–0 Ligue 2 loss to Niort, coming on as a late sub in the 88th minute.

On 11 June 2026, Bardeli signed a three-year contract with La Liga side Levante.

== Career statistics ==
As of 16 October 2026

Appearances and goals by club, season and competition
Club	Season	League			Cup		Other		Total	
Club	Season	Division	Apps	Goals	Apps	Goals	Apps	Goals	Apps	Goals
Lille B	2019–20	Championnat National 2	0	0	—		—		0	0
Lille B	2020–21	Championnat National 2	3	0	—		—		0	0
Lille B	Total		3	0	—		—		3	0
Dunkerque	2021–22	Ligue 2	7	0	0	0	—		7	0
Dunkerque	2022–23	Ligue 2	29	1	2	0	—		31	1
Dunkerque	2023–24	Ligue 2	38	3	1	0	—		39	3
Dunkerque	2024–25	Ligue 2	32	6	5	1	2 (Note: Appearances in the Ligue 2 promotion play-offs)	0	39	7
Dunkerque	2025–26	Ligue 2	33	9	2	1	—		35	10
Dunkerque	Total		139	19	10	2	2	0	151	21
Levante	2026–27	La Liga	8	1	0	0	—		8	1
Career total			150	20	10	2	2	0	162	22
