= Raúl Pereira =

Spanish footballer (born 2005)

Personal information
- Full name: Raúl Pereira Vargas
- Date of birth: 10 May 2005 (age 21)
- Place of birth: Algeciras, Spain
- Height: 1.78 m (5 ft 10 in)
- Position: Left-back

Team information
- Current team: Zaragoza

Youth career
- 2013–2020: Loluba
- 2020–2022: Balón de Cádiz
- 2021–2024: Cádiz

Senior career*
Years	Team	Apps	(Gls)
2023–2024	Cádiz C	1	(0)
2023	→ Atlético Sanluqueño (loan)	2	(0)
2024–2025	Cádiz B	32	(0)
2025–2026	Cádiz	14	(0)
2026–	Zaragoza	0	(0)
- * Club domestic league appearances and goals as of 31 May 2026

Raúl Pereira Vargas (born 10 May 2005) is a Spanish footballer who plays as a left-back for Real Zaragoza.

== Career ==
Born in Algeciras, Cádiz, Andalusia, Pereira began his career with hometown side Loluba CF before joining Cádiz CF's youth sides in 2020. On 29 August 2023, after finishing his formation, he was loaned to Primera Federación side Atlético Sanluqueño CF, for one year.

Pereira was recalled on 22 December 2023, after just two appearances, initially to return to the Juvenil A team. He played a few matches for the C-team in Primera Andaluza before establishing himself as a regular starter with the reserves in Segunda Federación, and renewed his contract until 2027 on 7 September 2024.

Pereira made his first team debut on 28 September 2025, coming on as a late substitute for Mario Climent in a 0–0 Segunda División home draw against AD Ceuta FC. The following 8 June, he signed a four-year contract with Real Zaragoza, freshly relegated to Primera Federación.
