= Hamza Bellari =

Moroccan footballer (born 2003)

Personal information
- Date of birth: 11 March 2003 (age 23)
- Place of birth: Nador, Morocco
- Height: 1.75 m (5 ft 9 in)
- Position: Winger

Team information
- Current team: Castellón
- Number: 19

Youth career
- Mercantil
- 2020–2021: Girona
- 2021: Jàbac Terrassa
- 2021: Damm
- 2021–2022: Cerdanyola

Senior career*
Years	Team	Apps	(Gls)
2022–2024	Pobla Mafumet	38	(5)
2024	→ Orihuela (loan)	15	(3)
2024–2026	Valencia B	14	(2)
2025–2026	→ Eldense (loan)	34	(3)
2026–	Castellón	3	(0)
- * Club domestic league appearances and goals as of 17 October 2026

Hamza Bellari (Arabic: حمزة بلاري; born 11 March 2003) is a Moroccan footballer who plays as a winger for Spanish club CD Castellón.

== Career ==
Born in Nador, Bellari moved to Catalonia at the age of three, and represented CE Mercantil, Girona FC, UFB Jàbac Terrassa, CF Damm and Cerdanyola del Vallès FC as a youth. In July 2022, he moved to Gimnàstic de Tarragona, being initially assigned to farm team CF Pobla de Mafumet in Tercera Federación.

On 3 January 2024, Bellari was loaned to Segunda Federación side Orihuela CF until June. After impressing with the side, he attracted the interest of several reserve teams, and was transferred to Valencia CF on 15 July, being initially a member of the B-team in the fourth division.

On 4 August 2025, Bellari was loaned to Primera Federación side CD Eldense for the season. The following 8 July, after helping the side to achieve promotion to Segunda División, he agreed to a three-year contract with CD Castellón in that category.

Bellari made his professional debut on 14 August 2026, coming on as a late substitute for Raúl Sánchez in a 1–0 away win over Real Sociedad B.
