= Carlos Marín (footballer) =

Spanish footballer (born 1997)

Personal information
- Full name: Carlos Marín Tomás
- Date of birth: 20 February 1997 (age 29)
- Place of birth: Almería, Spain
- Height: 1.87 m (6 ft 2 in)
- Position: Goalkeeper

Team information
- Current team: Albacete
- Number: 1

Youth career
- Los Ángeles
- Oriente
- 2010–2017: Atlético Madrid

Senior career*
| Years | Team | Apps | (Gls) |
| 2017–2019 | Atlético Madrid B | 8 | (0) |
| 2018–2019 | → Betis B (loan) | 32 | (0) |
| 2019–2021 | Betis B | 21 | (0) |
| 2021–2026 | Córdoba | 141 | (0) |
| 2026– | Albacete | 0 | (0) |

International career^{‡}
| 2013–2014 | Spain U17 | 3 | (0) |
- * Club domestic league appearances and goals as of 6 June 2026 ‡ National team caps and goals as of 19 June 2023

Carlos Marín Tomás (born 20 February 1997) is a Spanish footballer who plays as a goalkeeper for Segunda División side Albacete Balompié.

== Club career ==
Born in Almería, Andalusia, Marín joined Atlético Madrid's youth sides in 2010, from hometown side CD Oriente. He made his senior debut with the reserves on 26 March 2017, starting in a 1–0 Tercera División home win over FC Villanueva del Pardillo.

On 16 June 2017, Marín renewed his contract with Atleti until 2020, but remained a backup to Miguel San Román during the season before being loaned out to Betis Deportivo Balompié on 31 July 2018. On 5 July 2019, after being a starter for the side, he signed a permanent deal with the Verdiblancos.

On 29 July 2021, Marín agreed to a one-year contract with Segunda División RFEF side Córdoba CF. On 11 May 2022, after helping the club to achieve promotion to Primera Federación, he signed a two-year extension.

On 29 June 2024, after another promotion with the Blanquiverdes, Marín renewed his link until 2027. On 26 July 2026, he moved to fellow second division side Albacete Balompié on a two-year contract.

== Career statistics ==
As of 20 July 2024

Appearances and goals by club, season and competition
| Club | Season | League | | | National cup | | Europe | | Other | | Total | |
| Club | Season | Division | Apps | Goals | Apps | Goals | Apps | Goals | Apps | Goals | Apps | Goals |
|---|---|---|---|---|---|---|---|---|---|---|---|---|
| Atlético Madrid B | 2016–17 | Tercera División | 3 | 0 | — | | — | | — | | 3 | 0 |
| Atlético Madrid B | 2017–18 | Segunda División B | 5 | 0 | — | | — | | — | | 5 | 0 |
| Atlético Madrid B | Total | | 8 | 0 | — | | — | | — | | 8 | 0 |
| Betis Deportivo | 2018–19 | Tercera División | 32 | 0 | — | | — | | — | | 32 | 0 |
| Betis Deportivo | 2019–20 | Tercera División | 14 | 0 | — | | — | | 2 (Note: Appearances in Tercera División play-offs) | 0 | 16 | 0 |
| Betis Deportivo | 2020–21 | Segunda División B | 7 | 0 | — | | — | | — | | 7 | 0 |
| Betis Deportivo | Total | | 53 | 0 | — | | — | | 2 | 0 | 55 | 0 |
| Córdoba | 2021–22 | Segunda División RFEF | 21 | 0 | — | | — | | — | | 21 | 0 |
| Córdoba | 2022–23 | Primera Federación | 37 | 0 | 0 | 0 | — | | — | | 37 | 0 |
| Córdoba | 2023–24 | Primera Federación | 36 | 0 | 0 | 0 | — | | 4 (Note: Appearances in Primera Federación play-offs) | 0 | 40 | 0 |
| Total | | 94 | 0 | 0 | 0 | — | | 4 | 0 | 98 | 0 | |
| Career total | | | 155 | 0 | 0 | 0 | 0 | 0 | 6 | 0 | 161 | 0 |
