= Thiago Fernández =

Argentine footballer (born 2004)

Personal information
- Full name: Thiago Cruz Fernández
- Date of birth: 3 April 2004 (age 22)
- Place of birth: Buenos Aires, Argentina
- Height: 1.75 m (5 ft 9 in)
- Position: Left winger

Team information
- Current team: Levante (on loan from Villarreal)

Youth career
- 2014–2023: Vélez Sarsfield

Senior career*
| Years | Team | Apps | (Gls) |
| 2023–2025 | Vélez Sarsfield | 28 | (5) |
| 2026– | Villarreal | 0 | (0) |
| 2026 | → Oviedo (loan) | 16 | (0) |
| 2026– | → Levante (loan) | 3 | (0) |

International career
| 2024 | Argentina U23 | 2 | (0) |
- * Club domestic league appearances and goals as of 16:05, 14 September 2026 (UTC)

Thiago Cruz Fernández (born 3 April 2004) is an Argentine footballer who plays as a left winger for La Liga club Levante, on loan from Villarreal.

== Club career ==
=== Vélez Sarsfield ===
Fernández began playing football aged four and began training for Vélez Sarsfield when he was 10. He signed his first contract in October 2021, and in April 2023, after being called up to the first team, his deal was extended to December 2025.

On 21 April 2023, Fernández made his debut in the Argentine Primera División by starting in a 2–1 loss away to Colón. He scored his first professional goal on 5 June 2024, a direct free kick in a 2–1 win at Arsenal de Sarandí in the Copa Argentina. His first league goal followed on 21 July in a 3–0 home win over Talleres de Córdoba, with another four days later in a 2–0 victory at Platense.

With three games remaining of the season, on 1 December 2024 against Sarmiento, Fernández suffered an anterior cruciate ligament injury to his right knee, requiring surgery and being sidelined for several months. The team won their 11th league title, beating Talleres to the trophy on the final day; Fernández was recognised as the "great jewel" of the team by TyC Sports.

In August 2025, Vélez Sarsfield announced that Fernández had been removed from the professional squad, alleging that he had decided against renewing his contract that was set to expire at the end of the year. At the same time, he had a contractual agreement to join Villarreal CF in the Spanish La Liga once his contract had expired. He ended his spell at Vélez Sarsfield with 48 games in all competitions, six goals and nine assists, and published a critical message of the club's administration once he was a free agent.

=== Villarreal ===
On 2 January 2026, following the expiration of his contract with Vélez Sarsfield, Fernández joined Villarreal on a contract until the end of the 2030–31 season. Twenty days later, he was loaned to fellow league team Real Oviedo for the remainder of the season. On his debut as a substitute on 31 January, he assisted Ilyas Chaira for the only goal against Girona.

On 11 August 2026, Fernández was loaned to fellow top-tier side Levante, for one year.

== International career ==
Fernández was called up to the Argentina under-23 team for two friendly matches against Paraguay ahead of the 2024 Olympic event in France. He played the two games as a starter and substitute respectively, but was not chosen for the final tournament.

== Personal life ==
Fernández's father Daniel Osvaldo Fernández was also a footballer in the top division, for Ferro Carril Oeste.

== Honours ==
- Argentine Primera División: 2024
