= Sergio Ortuño =

Spanish footballer (born 1999)

Personal information
- Full name: Sergio Ortuño Díaz
- Date of birth: 2 March 1999 (age 27)
- Place of birth: Elda, Spain
- Height: 1.80 m (5 ft 11 in)
- Position: Midfielder

Team information
- Current team: Albacete

Youth career
- Eldense
- 2010–2014: Hércules
- 2014–2018: Deportivo La Coruña

Senior career*
Years	Team	Apps	(Gls)
2017–2019	Deportivo B	8	(0)
2018	Laracha	15	(1)
2019	→ Eldense (loan)	18	(3)
2019–2020	Hércules B	28	(2)
2020–2022	Eldense	31	(4)
2022–2023	Valladolid B	17	(1)
2022–2023	→ Eldense (loan)	37	(3)
2023–2025	Eldense	80	(6)
2025–2026	Cádiz	37	(1)
2026–	Albacete	0	(0)
- * Club domestic league appearances and goals as of 9 June 2026

Sergio Ortuño Díaz (born 2 March 1999), sometimes known as Ortu, is a Spanish professional footballer who plays as a midfielder for Albacete Balompié.

== Career ==
Born in Elda, Alicante, Valencian Community, Ortuño finished his formation with Deportivo de La Coruña, after representing Hércules CF and CD Eldense. He made his senior debut with the former's reserves on 15 October 2017, coming on as a second-half substitute in a 3–0 Segunda División B home win over CF Talavera de la Reina.

Ortuño was promoted to farm team Laracha CF in Tercera División ahead of the 2018–19 season, but was loaned back to former club Eldense on 21 December 2018. On 30 July 2019, he returned to Hércules and was assigned to the B-team also in the fourth division.

On 1 October 2020, Ortuño returned to Eldense on a permanent deal. On 25 January 2022, he agreed to a 18-month deal with Real Valladolid's reserves in Primera División RFEF, but returned to Eldense on loan on 14 July 2022.

Ortuño was an undisputed starter for the Azulgranas during the campaign, contributing with three goals in 44 appearances overall as the club returned to Segunda División after a 59-year absence. He signed a permanent contract with the club on 8 July 2023, and made his professional debut on 13 August, starting in a 1–0 away win over FC Cartagena.

Ortuño scored his first professional goal on 12 November 2023, netting Eldense's second in a 3–1 away win over FC Andorra. On 5 June 2025, after suffering relegation, he left the club, and signed a three-year deal with Cádiz CF eight days later.

On 2 July 2026, Ortuño moved to fellow second division side Albacete Balompié on a two-year contract.
