= 2023–24 CD Eldense season =

CD Eldense
2023–24 season
- President: Pascual Pérez Castillo
- Head coach: Fernando Estévez
- Stadium: Nuevo Pepico Amat
- Segunda División: 15th
- Copa del Rey: Second round
- Top goalscorer: League: Juanto Ortuño (5); All: Juanto Ortuño (6)
- Biggest win: 1–0 vs Cartagena; Eldense 2–1 Eibar
- Biggest defeat: 3–1 vs Villarreal B Levante 2–0 Eldense; Eldense 1–3 Oviedo
Third colours
- All statistics correct as of 1 November 2023.

The 2023–24 season is CD Eldense's 103rd season in existence and first one back in the Segunda División, the second division of association football in Spain. They will also compete in the Copa del Rey.

== Players ==
=== First-team squad ===
As of 26 August 2023.

Note: Flags indicate national team as defined under FIFA eligibility rules; some limited exceptions apply. Players may hold more than one non-FIFA nationality.

No.	Pos.	Nation	Player
1	GK	ESP	Guillermo Vallejo (4th captain)
2	DF	ESP	Toni Abad
3	DF	ESP	Álex Martínez
4	DF	BIH	Dario Đumić
5	DF	ESP	Íñigo Piña
6	DF	ESP	Carlos Hernández (vice-captain)
7	FW	ROU	Florin Andone
8	MF	ESP	Sergio Ortuño
9	FW	ESP	Mario Soberón
10	FW	ESP	Cris Montes
11	FW	ESP	Juanto Ortuño (5th captain)
12	DF	BRA	Derick Poloni
13	GK	ESP	Andoni Zubiaurre

No.	Pos.	Nation	Player
15	MF	ESP	Miguel Marí
16	MF	MAR	Youness Lachhab
17	MF	ESP	Jesús Clemente
18	MF	ESP	Pedro Capó (captain)
19	MF	ESP	Joel Jorquera
20	FW	ESP	Iván Chapela
21	MF	ESP	Álex Bernal
22	MF	FRA	Marc-Olivier Doué
23	MF	ESP	Marc Mateu
24	MF	ESP	David Timor (3rd captain)
27	FW	ITA	Eddie Salcedo (on loan from Inter Milan)
29	FW	ESP	Arnau Ortiz (on loan from Girona)

=== Other players under contract ===
Note: Flags indicate national team as defined under FIFA eligibility rules; some limited exceptions apply. Players may hold more than one non-FIFA nationality.

No.	Pos.	Nation	Player
—	FW	ESP	Ángel Sánchez

=== Youth players ===
Note: Flags indicate national team as defined under FIFA eligibility rules; some limited exceptions apply. Players may hold more than one non-FIFA nationality.

No.	Pos.	Nation	Player
26	GK	ESP	Antonio Pina
30	GK	ESP	Luismi Quirant

=== Out on loan ===
Note: Flags indicate national team as defined under FIFA eligibility rules; some limited exceptions apply. Players may hold more than one non-FIFA nationality.

No.	Pos.	Nation	Player
—	DF	ESP	Xavi Estacio (at San Fernando until 30 June 2024)
—	MF	ESP	Mario da Costa (at Atlético de Madrid B until 30 June 2024)

== Transfers ==
=== In ===
Pos.	Player	Transferred from	Fee	Date	Source
MF	(Spain) David Timor	(Spain) Huesca	Free	12 July 2023	
MF	(Spain) Marc Mateu	(Spain) Huesca	Free	25 July 2023	
FW	(Romania) Florin Andone	(Spain) Las Palmas	Free	30 July 2023	
MF	(Brazil) Derick Poloni	(Portugal) Casa Pia	Undisclosed	20 August 2023	
FW	(Italy) Eddie Salcedo	(Italy) Inter Milan	Loan	25 August 2023	

=== Out ===
Pos.	Player	Transferred to	Fee	Date	Source
FW	(Italy) Eddie Salcedo	(Italy) Inter Milan	Loan return	9 January 2024	

== Pre-season and friendlies ==
Win Draw Loss Fixtures

29 July 2023 Friendly	Albacete	2–3	Eldense	La Nucía
16:00 CEST (UTC+2)	Fuster 59'; Quiles 90+3' (pen.)		Soberón 22'; Juanto (penalty missed) 45+2'; Jorquera 67'; Chapela 88'	Stadium: Campo 2 La Nucía

2 August 2023 Friendly	Eldense	0–0	Tenerife	La Nucía
19:00 CEST (UTC+2)				Stadium: Estadi Olímpic Camilo Cano; Attendance: 800; Referee: Jorge Tárraga Lajara

6 August 2023 Friendly	Eldense	1–1	Intercity	Algorfa
19:00 CEST (UTC+2)	Ortuño 22'		Nsue 55'	Stadium: Instalaciones de La Finca Golf; Referee: Alejandro Ojaos Valera

== Competitions ==
=== Overall record ===
Competition	First match	Last match	Starting round	Record							
Competition	First match	Last match	Starting round	Pld	W	D	L	GF	GA	GD	Win %
Segunda División	14 August 2023	May 2024	Matchday 1	13	4	4	5	15	19	−4	30.77
Copa del Rey	1 November 2023		First round	1	1	0	0	3	2	+1	100.00
Total				14	5	4	5	18	21	−3	35.71

Last updated: 1 November 2023
Source: Soccerway

=== Segunda División ===
==== League table ====
Pos	Team	Pld	W	D	L	GF	GA	GD	Pts
14	Cartagena	42	14	9	19	37	51	−14	51 (Note: Albacete finished ahead of Cartagena and Zaragoza on head-to-head points: Albacete 6 pts, Cartagena 5 pts, Zaragoza 4 pts)
15	Zaragoza	42	12	15	15	42	42	0	51
16	Eldense	42	12	14	16	46	56	−10	50
17	Huesca	42	11	16	15	36	33	+3	49 (Note: Huesca finished ahead of Mirandés on head-to-head points: Huesca 1–1 Mirandés, Mirandés 0–3 Huesca)
18	Mirandés	42	12	13	17	47	55	−8	49

Updated to match(es) played on 2 Jun 2024. Source: LaLiga HyperMotion
Rules for classification: 1) Points; 2) Head-to-head points; 3) Head-to-head goal difference; 4) Goal difference; 5) Goals scored; 6) Fair-play points
(Note: Head-to-head record is used only after all the matches between the teams in question have been played)

==== Results summary ====
Overall								Home						Away					
Pld	W	D	L	GF	GA	GD	Pts	W	D	L	GF	GA	GD	W	D	L	GF	GA	GD
42	12	14	16	46	56	−10	50	6	8	7	24	25	−1	6	6	9	22	31	−9

Source: LaLiga.com

==== Results by round ====
Round	1	2	3	4	5	6	7	8	9	10	11	12	13	14
Ground	A	A	H	A	H	A	A	H	H	A	H	A	H	H
Result	W	L	W	L	D	D	L	L	L	W	D	D	W	
Position	6	13	7	8	11	13	16	18						

Updated to match(es) played on 1 November 2023. Source: LaLiga.com
A = Away; H = Home; W = Win; D = Draw; L = Loss

==== Matches ====
The league fixtures were unveiled on 28 June 2023.

13 August 2023 1	Cartagena	0–1	Eldense	Cartagena
19:30 CEST (UTC+2)	Muñoz (yellow card) 75'	Report	Timor (yellow card) 36'; J. Ortuño 41'	Stadium: Cartagonova; Referee: Miguel Sesma Espinosa

21 August 2023 2	Villarreal B	3–1	Eldense	Villarreal
19:00 CEST (UTC+2)	Pascual 4'; Forés 27'; Ab. Del Moral (yellow card) 45+3'; Al. Del Moral 50'; Espigares (yellow card) 90'	Report	S. Ortuño (yellow card) 18'; J. Ortuño 34'; Mateu (penalty missed) 90+14'	Stadium: Estadio de la Cerámica; Attendance: 3,957; Referee: Manuel Jesús Orellana Cid

28 August 2023 3	Eldense	2–1	Eibar	Elda
19:00 CEST (UTC+2)	J. Ortuño 29'; Andone 39'; Sebastián (yellow card) 66'	Report	Venâncio (yellow card) 59'; Gutiérrez (yellow card) 65'; Rahmani (yellow card) 67'; Vencedor (yellow card) 83'; Aketxe 89'	Stadium: Nuevo Pepico Amat; Attendance: 4,356; Referee: Miguel González Díaz

3 September 2023 4	Zaragoza	2–0	Eldense	Zaragoza
18:30 CEST (UTC+2)	Azón 42'; Sebastián 57' (o.g.)	Report		Stadium: La Romareda; Attendance: 26,011; Referee: José Antonio López Toca

11 September 2023 5	Eldense	2–2	Alcorcón	Elda
21:00 CEST (UTC+2)	Chapela 52'; Hernández 73'	Report	Addai 66'; Chiki 90+6'	Stadium: Nuevo Pepico Amat; Attendance: 3,960; Referee: Germán Cid Camacho

17 September 2023 6	Espanyol	3–3	Eldense	Barcelona
18:30 CEST (UTC+2)	Braithwaite 50'; Puado 59', 90+14' (pen.)	Report	Soberón 10'; Chapela 15'; Andone 51'	Stadium: Stage Front Stadium; Attendance: 20,773; Referee: Álvaro Moreno Aragón

23 September 2023 7	Levante	2–0	Eldense	Valencia
16:15 CEST (UTC+2)	Bouldini 28'; Fabrício 82'	Report		Stadium: Estadi Ciutat de València; Attendance: 14,845; Referee: Rafael Sánchez López

1 October 2023 8	Eldense	1–3	Oviedo	Elda
14:00 CEST (UTC+2)	Salcedo 80' (pen.); Soberón (yellow card) 82'	Report	Bretones 6'; De la Fuente 14'; Bastón 25'	Stadium: Nuevo Pepico Amat; Attendance: 4,050; Referee: Salvador Lax Franco

4 October 2023 9	Eldense	0–1	Valladolid	Elda
19:00 CEST (UTC+2)		Report	Sylla 25'	Stadium: Nuevo Pepico Amat; Referee: Miguel Sesma Espinosa

7 October 2023 10	Huesca	0–1	Eldense	Huesca
16:15 CEST (UTC+2)	Balboa (red card) 90+11'	Report	Soberón 90+6'	Stadium: El Alcoraz; Referee: Adrián Cordero Vega

15 October 2023 11	Eldense	1–1	Elche	Elda
16:15 CEST (UTC+2)				Stadium: Nuevo Pepico Amat; Referee: Dámaso Arcediano Monescillo

22 October 2023 12	Racing Ferrol	1–1	Eldense	Ferrol
14:00 CEST (UTC+2)				Referee: Álvaro Moreno Aragón

28 October 2023 13	Eldense	2–0	Amorebieta	Elda
14:00 CEST (UTC+2)				Stadium: Nuevo Pepico Amat; Referee: Daniel Jesús Trujillo Suárez

5 November 2023 14	Eldense	2–0	Burgos	Elda
21:00 CET (UTC+1)				Stadium: Nuevo Pepico Amat

4 February 2024 25	Oviedo	1–1	Eldense	Oviedo
16:15	Bastón 71' (pen.)		Chapela 23'; Đumić (red card) 70'	Stadium: Estadio Carlos Tartiere; Referee: José Luis Guzmán Mansilla

25 February 2024 28	Eldense	v	Racing Ferrol	Elda
14:00				Stadium: Nuevo Pepico Amat

19 May 2024 40	Eldense	v	Levante	Elda
				Stadium: Nuevo Pepico Amat

=== Copa del Rey ===
1 November 2023 First round	Real Jaén	2–3	Eldense	Jaén
16:30 CET (UTC+1)				Stadium: Nuevo Estadio de La Victoria
