= 2023–24 Villarreal CF B season =

Villarreal CF B
2023–24 season
- President: Fernando Roig
- Head coach: Miguel Álvarez
- Stadium: Ciudad Deportiva Villarreal CF; Estadio de la Cerámica (sometimes)
- Segunda División: 22nd (relegated)
Home colours	Away colours	Third colours

The 2023–24 season was Villarreal CF B's 25th season in existence and second consecutive in the Segunda División, the second division of association football in Spain.

== Players ==
=== First-team squad ===
As of 1 September 2023.

Note: Flags indicate national team as defined under FIFA eligibility rules; some limited exceptions apply. Players may hold more than one non-FIFA nationality.

No.	Pos.	Nation	Player
1	GK	AND	Iker Álvarez
2	DF	ESP	Adrià Altimira
3	DF	ESP	Dani Tasende
4	DF	ESP	Hugo Pérez
5	DF	ESP	Abraham del Moral
6	MF	ESP	Alberto del Moral
7	MF	ESP	Diego Collado
8	MF	ESP	Carlo Adriano (captain)
9	FW	ESP	Álex Forés
10	MF	ESP	Javi Ontiveros
11	FW	ESP	Jorge Pascual
12	DF	SRB	Stefan Leković (on loan from Red Star Belgrade)
13	GK	ESP	Miguel Ángel Morro (on loan from Rayo Vallecano)
14	MF	ESP	Aitor Gelardo

No.	Pos.	Nation	Player
15	MF	ESP	Marcos Sánchez
16	DF	ESP	Lanchi
17	FW	ESP	Fabio Blanco
18	DF	ESP	Carlos Romero
19	DF	ESP	Pablo Íñiguez
20	FW	ESP	Ilias Akhomach
21	MF	ESP	Rodri Alonso
22	MF	ARG	Tiago Geralnik
23	FW	ESP	Víctor Moreno
24	FW	URU	Andrés Ferrari
25	MF	ESP	Jordi Ortega
27	MF	ESP	Dani Requena
29	DF	ESP	Antonio Espigares
35	GK	ESP	Rubén Gómez

=== Reserve team ===
Note: Flags indicate national team as defined under FIFA eligibility rules; some limited exceptions apply. Players may hold more than one non-FIFA nationality.

No.	Pos.	Nation	Player
26	MF	ARG	Facundo Viveros
33	DF	ESP	Pau Navarro

== Transfers ==
=== In ===
Pos.	Player	Transferred from	Fee	Date	Source
FW	(Uruguay) Andrés Ferrari	(Uruguay) Defensor SC	€2,500,000	1 July 2023	
MF	(Spain) Fabio Blanco	(Spain) Barça Atlètic	€700,000	1 July 2023	
DF	(Spain) Adrià Altimira	FC Andorra	Free	1 July 2023	
DF	(Serbia) Stefan Leković	(Serbia) Red Star Belgrade	Loan + €300,000	1 September 2023	
DF	(Spain) Hugo Novoa	(Germany) RB Leipzig	Loan	30 January 2024	

=== Out ===
Pos.	Player	Transferred to	Fee	Date	Source
FW	(Spain) Fer Niño	(Spain) Burgos	Free	1 July 2023	
MF	(Russia) Nikita Iosifov	(Spain) Mirandés	Free	5 July 2023	
MF	(Spain) Sergio Lozano	(Spain) Levante	Free	6 July 2023	
MF	(Spain) Fabio Blanco	(Spain) Cultural Leonesa	Loan	12 January 2024	

== Pre-season and friendlies ==
Win Draw Loss

15 July 2023 Friendly	FC Wil (Switzerland)	0–2	(Spain) Villarreal B
17:00

18 July 2023 Friendly	FC Winterthur (Switzerland)	3–1	(Spain) Villarreal B
19:00

26 July 2023 Friendly	Villarreal B (Spain)	4–0	(Spain) Sabadell
19:00

28 July 2023 Friendly	Villarreal B (Spain)	2–0	(Spain) Andorra
19:00

5 August 2023 Teide Trophy	Tenerife (Spain)	2–0	(Spain) Villarreal B	La Orotava
20:00 WEST (UTC+1)	Alassan 31'; Williams 34'			Stadium: Estadio Municipal Los Cuartos; Referee: Juan Luis Pulido Santana

== Competitions ==
=== Overall record ===
Competition	First match	Last match	Starting round	Final position	Record							
Competition	First match	Last match	Starting round	Final position	Pld	W	D	L	GF	GA	GD	Win %
Segunda División	12 August 2023	2 June 2024	Matchday 1	22nd	42	11	10	21	41	62	−21	26.19
Total					42	11	10	21	41	62	−21	26.19

Source: Soccerway

=== Segunda División ===
==== League table ====
Pos	Team	Pld	W	D	L	GF	GA	GD	Pts	Qualification or relegation
18	Mirandés	42	12	13	17	47	55	−8	49 (Note: Huesca finished ahead of Mirandés on head-to-head points: Huesca 1–1 Mirandés, Mirandés 0–3 Huesca)	
19	Amorebieta (R)	42	11	12	19	37	53	−16	45	Relegation to Primera Federación
20	Alcorcón (R)	42	10	14	18	32	53	−21	44	Relegation to Primera Federación
21	Andorra (R)	42	11	10	21	33	53	−20	43 (Note: Andorra finished ahead of Villarreal B on overall goal difference)	Relegation to Primera Federación
22	Villarreal B (R)	42	11	10	21	41	62	−21	43	Relegation to Primera Federación

Updated to match(es) played on 2 Jun 2024. Source: LaLiga HyperMotion
Rules for classification: 1) Points; 2) Head-to-head points; 3) Head-to-head goal difference; 4) Goal difference; 5) Goals scored; 6) Fair-play points
(Note: Head-to-head record is used only after all the matches between the teams in question have been played)
(R) Relegated

==== Results summary ====
Overall								Home						Away					
Pld	W	D	L	GF	GA	GD	Pts	W	D	L	GF	GA	GD	W	D	L	GF	GA	GD
0	0	0	0	0	0	0	0	0	0	0	0	0	0	0	0	0	0	0	0

==== Results by round ====
Round	1
Ground	
Result	
Position	

A = Away; H = Home; W = Win; D = Draw; L = Loss

==== Matches ====
The league fixtures were unveiled on 28 June 2023.

12 August 2023 1	Zaragoza	2–0	Villarreal B	Zaragoza
21:00

21 August 2023 2	Villarreal B	3–1	Eldense	Villarreal
19:00 CEST (UTC+2)	Pascual 4'; Forés 27'; Ab. Del Moral (yellow card) 45+3'; Al. Del Moral 50'; Espigares (yellow card) 90'	Report	S. Ortuño (yellow card) 18'; J. Ortuño 34'; Mateu (penalty missed) 90+14'	Stadium: Estadio de la Cerámica; Attendance: 3,957; Referee: Manuel Jesús Orellana Cid

26 August 2023 3	Elche	1–0	Villarreal B	Elche
21:30 CEST (UTC+2)	Chaves 9' (pen.); Josan (yellow card) 84'; Clerc (yellow card) 90+2'	Report		Stadium: Estadio Martínez Valero; Attendance: 13,318; Referee: Rafael Sánchez López

21 October 2023 12	Villarreal B	0–3	Mirandés	Villarreal
16:15				Stadium: Estadio de la Cerámica

29 October 2023 13	Leganés	1–0	Villarreal B	Leganés
18:30				Stadium: Estadio Municipal de Butarque

4 November 2023 14	Villarreal B	0–3	Sporting Gijón	Villarreal
16:15				Stadium: Estadio de la Cerámica

12 November 2023 15	Tenerife	0–1	Villarreal B	Santa Cruz de Tenerife
17:30				Stadium: Estadio Heliodoro Rodríguez López

19 November 2023 16	Villarreal B	0–0	Andorra	Villarreal
18:30				Stadium: Estadio de la Cerámica

25 November 2023 17	Racing Santander	2–0	Villarreal B	Santander
16:15				Stadium: El Sardinero

4 December 2023 18	Villarreal B	1–0	Eibar	Villarreal
20:30	Forés 90+2'			Stadium: Estadio de la Cerámica

8 December 2023 19	Albacete	2–0	Villarreal B	Albacete
18:30				Stadium: Estadio Carlos Belmonte

18 December 2023 20	Villarreal B	1–0	Valladolid
20:30

21 December 2023 21	Villarreal B	1–1	Oviedo
19:00

14 January 2024 22	Cartagena	4–1	Villarreal B	Cartagena
16:15				Stadium: Cartagonova

20 January 2024 23	Espanyol	2–1	Villarreal B	Cornellà de Llobregat
18:30				Stadium: Stage Front Stadium

28 January 2024 24	Villarreal B	1–1	Huesca
16:15

3 February 2024 25	Mirandés	3–0	Villarreal B
16:15

11 February 2024 26	Villarreal B	1–0	Tenerife
14:00

18 February 2024 27	Andorra	1–1	Villarreal B	Andorra la Vella
16:15

25 February 2024 28	Villarreal B	0–0	Zaragoza
18:30

3 March 2024 29	Eldense	v	Villarreal B

10 March 2024 30	Villarreal B	v	Elche

17 March 2024 31	Eibar	v	Villarreal B

24 March 2024 32	Villarreal B	v	Leganés

31 March 2024 33	Oviedo	v	Villarreal B

7 April 2024 34	Villarreal B	v	Burgos

14 April 2024 35	Alcorcón	v	Villarreal B

21 April 2024 36	Villarreal B	v	Racing Ferrol

28 April 2024 37	Sporting Gijón	v	Villarreal B

5 May 2024 38	Villarreal B	v	Levante

12 May 2024 39	Amorebieta	v	Villarreal B

19 May 2024 40	Villarreal B	v	Albacete

26 May 2024 41	Valladolid	v	Villarreal B

2 June 2024 42	Villarreal B	v	Racing Santander
