= 2023 Primera Federación play-offs =

The 2023 Primera Federación play-offs (Playoffs de Ascenso or Promoción de Ascenso) are the final play-offs for promotion from 2022–23 Primera Federación to the 2023–24 Segunda División.

== Format ==
Teams ranked second through fifth in each of the two groups will qualify for the promotion play-off, which will determine the last two promotion spots. The eight qualified teams will be drawn into two fixed brackets, each of which will contain the second and fourth-place finishers from one group and the third and fifth-place finishers from the other. All ties will consist of a two-legged knockout series. In case of draws, an overtime period will be played; if the match is still tied following the overtime, the team which achieved a higher regular season finish will be proclaimed the winner.

As of this season, the RFEF recovered the two-legged knockout system, due to the complaints filed against the single knockout system at a neutral venue that had been implemented after COVID-19 and the subsequent reform of the football leagues organized by the RFEF.

=== Bracket ===
Semi–finals (3–4 and 10–11 June)
5B	Real Sociedad B	1	1	2
2A	Alcorcón	2	1	3
4A	Deportivo La Coruña	1	3	4
3B	Castellón	0	4	4

Finals (17–18 and 24–25 June)
2A	Alcorcón	0	2	2
3B	Castellón	0	1	1

Semi–finals (3–4 and 10–11 June)
5A	Celta Vigo B	3	0	3
2B	Eldense	2	2	4
4B	Barcelona Atlètic	4	0	4
3A	Real Madrid Castilla	2	3	5

Finals (17–18 and 24–25 June)
2B	Eldense	1	3	4
3A	Real Madrid Castilla	1	3	4

=== First round ===
==== Qualified teams ====
Group	Position	Team
1	2nd	Alcorcón
2	2nd	Eldense

Group	Position	Team
1	3rd	Real Madrid Castilla
2	3rd	Castellón

Group	Position	Team
1	4th	Deportivo La Coruña
2	4th	Barcelona Atlètic

Group	Position	Team
1	5th	Celta Vigo B
2	5th	Real Sociedad B

==== Matches ====
===== Semi-finals =====
Team 1	Agg.	Team 2	1st leg	2nd leg
Real Sociedad B	2–3	Alcorcón	1–2	1–1
Deportivo La Coruña	4–4 (seed)	Castellón	1–0	3–4
Celta Vigo B	3–4	Eldense	3–2	0–2
Barcelona Atlètic	4–5	Real Madrid Castilla	4–2	0–3

First leg

3 June 2023	Celta Vigo B	3–2	Eldense	Vigo
17:00 UTC+2	Lauti 32', 35', 60'	Report	Nieto 23'; Soberón 53'	Stadium: Estadio de Balaídos; Referee: Eder Mallo Fernández

3 June 2023	Real Sociedad B	1–2	Alcorcón	San Sebastián
19:00 UTC+2	Azkune 90+4'		González 17'; Dalmau 60'	Stadium: Zubieta Facilities; Referee: Luis Bestard Severa

3 June 2023	Barcelona Atlètic	4–2	Real Madrid Castilla	Sant Joan Despí
21:00 UTC+2	Riad 19'; Rodríguez 44'; Cruz 76', 80'	Report	Paz 13'; Dotor 68'	Stadium: Estadi Johan Cruyff; Attendance: 4,324; Referee: Sergiu Claudiu Maresan Maresan

4 June 2023	Deportivo La Coruña	1–0	Castellón	A Coruña
19:00 UTC+2	Svensson 59'	Report		Stadium: Estadio Riazor; Attendance: 28,828; Referee: Guillermo Conejero Sánchez

Second leg

10 June 2023	Alcorcón	1–1 (3–2 agg.)	Real Sociedad B	Alcorcón
19:00 UTC+2	Chiki 82'	Report	Kortajarena 65'	Stadium: Estadio Municipal de Santo Domingo; Referee: Alonso de Ena

10 June 2023	Eldense	2–0 (4–3 agg.)	Celta Vigo B	Elda
19:00 UTC+2	Soberón 55'; Nieto 69'	Report		Stadium: Nuevo Pepico Amat; Referee: Palencia Caballero

11 June 2023	Castellón	4–3 (a.e.t.) (4–4 agg.)	Deportivo La Coruña	Castellón de la Plana
18:00 UTC+2	de Miguel 23'; de León 31'; Indias 89'; Cubillas 108'	Report	Yeremay 38'; Lucas Pérez 59' (pen.); Mackay (red card) 90+5'; Zalazar 98'	Stadium: Nou Estadi Castàlia; Referee: Manuel Ángel Pérez Hernández
Note: Castellón qualified to the finals after having a higher regular season finish

11 June 2023	Real Madrid Castilla	3–0 (5–4 agg.)	Barcelona Atlètic	Madrid
20:00 UTC+2	Dotor 21'; Bravo 78'; Arribas 90+3' (pen.)	Report		Stadium: Estadio Alfredo Di Stéfano; Attendance: 5,017; Referee: Cid Camacho

=== Second round ===
==== Qualified teams ====
Group	Position	Team
1	2nd	Alcorcón
2	2nd	Eldense

Group	Position	Team
1	3rd	Real Madrid Castilla
2	3rd	Castellón

==== Matches ====
===== Finals =====
Team 1	Agg.	Team 2	1st leg	2nd leg
Real Madrid Castilla	4–4 (seed)	Eldense	1–1	3–3
Castellón	1–2	Alcorcón	0–0	1–2

First leg

17 June 2023	Real Madrid Castilla	1–1	Eldense	Madrid
19:30 UTC+2	Arribas 69'	Report	Manu Nieto 45+1'	Stadium: Estadio Alfredo Di Stéfano; Referee: Orellana Cid

18 June 2023	Castellón	0–0	Alcorcón	Castellón de la Plana
19:00 UTC+2				Stadium: Nou Estadi Castàlia; Referee: Sesma Espinosa

Second leg

24 June 2023	Alcorcón	2–1 (2–1 agg.)	Castellón	Alcorcón
20:00 UTC+2	Addai 56'; Javier Castro 62'	Report	Jesús de Miguel 13'	Stadium: Estadio Municipal de Santo Domingo; Attendance: 5,100; Referee: Lax Franco

25 June 2023	Eldense	3–3 (a.e.t.) (4–4 agg.)	Real Madrid Castilla	Elda
20:00 UTC+2	Manu Nieto 45+2'; Carlos Hernández 67'; Juanto Ortuño 113'	Report	Rafa Marín 25'; Dotor 34'; Arribas 107' (pen.)	Stadium: Nuevo Pepico Amat; Attendance: 4,089; Referee: González Díaz
Note: Eldense promoted after having a higher regular season finish

== Promoted teams ==
- The two teams that were promoted to Segunda División through regular season groups and the two play–off winners are included.

Promoted to Segunda División
Amorebieta (1 year later)	Racing Ferrol (15 years later)	Alcorcón (1 year later)	Eldense (59 years later)
