= CA Deva =

Spanish football club

Atlético Deva
- Full name: Club Atlético Deva
- Founded: 1950
- Ground: El Llance, Unquera, Val de San Vicente, Cantabria, Spain
- Capacity: 2,000
- Chairman: (Spain) Manuel Roiz
- Manager: (Spain) Carlos Mon
- League: Primera Regional
- 2024–25: Segunda Regional – Group A, 1st of 18 (champions)
Home colours	Away colours

Club Atlético Deva is a football team based in Unquera, Val de San Vicente in the autonomous community of Cantabria. Founded in 1950, the team plays in Primera Regional. The club's home ground is El Llance, which has a capacity of 2,000 spectators.

== Season to season ==
Season	Tier	Division	Place	Copa del Rey
1966–67	5	1ª Reg.	9th	
1967–68	5	1ª Reg.	11th	
1968–69	5	2ª Reg.	13th	
1969–70	5	2ª Reg.	10th	
1970–71	6	3ª Reg.	6th	
1971–72	6	3ª Reg.	1st	
1972–73	5	2ª Reg.	15th	
1973–74	6	3ª Reg.	1st	
1974–75	5	1ª Reg.	10th	
1975–76	5	1ª Reg.	15th	
1976–77	6	2ª Reg.	6th	
1977–78	7	2ª Reg.	6th	
1978–79	6	1ª Reg.	16th	
1979–80	6	1ª Reg.	14th	
1980–81	6	1ª Reg.	7th	
1981–82	6	1ª Reg.	16th	
1982–83	6	1ª Reg.	15th	
1983–84	6	1ª Reg.	3rd	
1984–85	6	1ª Reg.	3rd	
1985–86	6	1ª Reg.	1st	

Season	Tier	Division	Place	Copa del Rey
1986–87	5	Reg. Pref.	13th	
1987–88	5	Reg. Pref.	10th	
1988–89	5	Reg. Pref.	7th	
1989–90	5	Reg. Pref.	6th	
1990–91	5	Reg. Pref.	12th	
1991–92	5	Reg. Pref.	12th	
1992–93	5	Reg. Pref.	10th	
1993–94	5	Reg. Pref.	4th	
1994–95	5	Reg. Pref.	11th	
1995–96	5	Reg. Pref.	11th	
1996–97	5	Reg. Pref.	1st	
1997–98	4	3ª	18th	
1998–99	5	Reg. Pref.	1st	
1999–2000	4	3ª	5th	
2000–01	4	3ª	5th	
2001–02	4	3ª	8th	
2002–03	4	3ª	14th	
2003–04	4	3ª	14th	
2004–05	4	3ª	20th	
2005–06	5	Reg. Pref.	7th	

Season	Tier	Division	Place	Copa del Rey
2006–07	5	Reg. Pref.	1st	
2007–08	4	3ª	11th	
2008–09	4	3ª	12th	
2009–10	4	3ª	20th	
2010–11	5	Reg. Pref.	11th	
2011–12	5	Reg. Pref.	17th	
2012–13	6	1ª Reg.	4th	
2013–14	6	1ª Reg.	6th	
2014–15	6	1ª Reg.	7th	
2015–16	6	1ª Reg.	13th	
2016–17	6	1ª Reg.	11th	
2017–18	6	1ª Reg.	12th	
2018–19	6	1ª Reg.	3rd	
2019–20	5	Reg. Pref.	16th	
2020–21	5	Reg. Pref.	9th	
2021–22	7	1ª Reg.	15th	
2022–23	8	2ª Reg.	14th	
2023–24	8	2ª Reg.	8th	
2024–25	8	2ª Reg.	1st	
2025–26	7	1ª Reg.		

- 10 seasons in Tercera División
