= Mario Soberón =

Spanish footballer (born 1997)

Personal information
- Full name: Mario Soberón Gutiérrez
- Date of birth: 18 May 1997 (age 29)
- Place of birth: Unquera, Spain
- Height: 1.78 m (5 ft 10 in)
- Position: Forward

Team information
- Current team: Albacete

Youth career
- Racing Santander

Senior career*
Years	Team	Apps	(Gls)
2016–2018	Racing B	87	(29)
2018–2019	Racing Santander	5	(0)
2019	→ Amorebieta (loan)	18	(7)
2019–2020	Valladolid B	11	(1)
2020–2021	Levante B	31	(5)
2021–2022	Logroñés	34	(9)
2022–2024	Eldense	68	(20)
2024–2026	Zaragoza	50	(12)
2026–	Albacete	0	(0)
- * Club domestic league appearances and goals as of 31 May 2026

Mario Soberón Gutiérrez (born 18 May 1997) is a Spanish footballer who plays as a forward for Albacete Balompié.

== Club career ==
Soberón was born in Unquera, Val de San Vicente, Cantabria, and represented Racing de Santander as a youth. He made his senior debut with the reserves on 22 August 2015, starting and scoring his side's third in a 4–2 Tercera División home win over SD Atlético Albericia.

On 13 July 2018, Soberón renewed his contract with the Verdiblancos until 2021, being definitely promoted to the main squad in Segunda División B. The following 7 January, after featuring rarely, he was loaned to fellow league team SD Amorebieta for the remainder of the season.

On 11 July 2019, Soberón signed a two-year deal with Real Valladolid and was assigned to the B-team also in division three. On 10 January of the following year, however, he moved to another reserve team, Atlético Levante UD of the same league.

On 5 July 2021, Soberón joined Primera División RFEF side SD Logroñés. On 25 June 2022, he signed for fellow league team CD Eldense, and was a regular starter during the campaign as the club returned to Segunda División after 59 years.

Soberón made his professional debut on 28 August 2023, coming on as a second-half substitute for goalscorer Juanto Ortuño in a 2–1 home win over SD Eibar. He scored his first goal as a professional on 17 September, netting the opener in a 3–3 away draw against RCD Espanyol.

On 21 June 2024, Soberón agreed to a two-year contract with fellow second division side Real Zaragoza. On 29 June 2026, after suffering relegation, he moved to Albacete Balompié on a deal of the same length.
