= Andoni Zubiaurre =

Spanish footballer (born 1996)

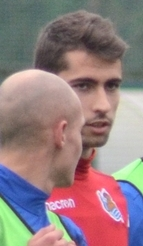
- Zubiaurre in 2018

Personal information
- Full name: Andoni Zubiaurre Dorronsoro
- Date of birth: 4 December 1996 (age 29)
- Place of birth: Ordizia, Spain
- Height: 1.90 m (6 ft 3 in)
- Position: Goalkeeper

Team information
- Current team: Johor Darul Ta'zim
- Number: 58

Youth career
- 2008–2012: Ordizia
- 2012–2015: Antiguoko

Senior career*
| Years | Team | Apps | (Gls) |
| 2015–2016 | Real Sociedad C | 31 | (0) |
| 2019–2022 | Real Sociedad B | 86 | (0) |
| 2020–2021 | → Cultural Leonesa (loan) | 23 | (0) |
| 2022–2023 | Real Sociedad | 0 | (0) |
| 2023–2024 | Eldense | 10 | (0) |
| 2024 | → Mirandés (loan) | 0 | (0) |
| 2024– | Johor Darul Ta'zim | 0 | (0) |
- * Club domestic league appearances and goals as of 15 December 2023

Andoni Zubiaurre Dorronsoro (born 4 December 1996) is a Spanish professional footballer who plays as a goalkeeper for Malaysia Super League club Johor Darul Ta'zim.

== Career ==
Born in Ordizia, Gipuzkoa, Basque Country, Zubiaurre represented Ordizia KE and Antiguoko as a youth.

=== Real Sociedad ===
In June 2015, Zubiaurre joined Real Sociedad and was assigned to the second reserve team in Tercera División.

Promoted to the reserves in Segunda División B for the 2017–18 season, Zubiaurre renewed his contract until 2021 on 13 June 2018. On 29 August of the following year, he further extended his link until 2022.

Upon returning from his loan with Cultural Leonesa, he was assigned back to the B-team, now in Segunda División, and made his professional debut on 14 August 2021 by starting in a 1–0 home win over CD Leganés.

Definitely promoted to the main squad for the 2022–23 season, Zubiaurre made his first team debut on 13 November 2022, starting in a 4–1 away routing of CD Cazalegas, for the campaign's Copa del Rey.

Cultural Leonesa (loan)

On 1 October 2020, Zubiaurre was loaned to Cultural y Deportiva Leonesa for 2020–21 Segunda División B season. He make his debut for the club on 17 October in a league match against Sporting Atlético in a 4–2 win.

=== Eldense ===
On 17 July 2023, Zubiaurre signed a two-year contract with CD Eldense in the second division. He make his debut for the club 4 October in a 1–0 lost to Real Valladolid.

Initially a backup to Guillermo Vallejo, Zubiaurre enjoyed a short period as a first-choice before losing his spot to Álvaro Aceves.

==== Mirandés (loan) ====
On 17 January 2024, Zubiaurre was loaned to fellow second division side CD Mirandés for the remainder of the campaign, with a buyout clause. However on 30 August 2024, Zubiaurre terminated his contract with the club

=== Johor Darul Ta'zim ===
On 5 September 2024, Zubiaurre moved to Southeast Asia to joined with Malaysia Super League club Johor Darul Ta'zim, however, he was only used for the club 2024–25 AFC Champions League Elite campaign. He make his debut against Chinese club Shanghai Port in a 2–2 draw on 18 September. In the next match playing at home against Chinese club Shanghai Shenghua, Zubiaurre kept a clean sheet in a 3–0 win.

== Career statistics ==
As of match played 11 March 2025

Appearances and goals by club, season and competition
| Club | Season | League | | | National cup | | Continental | | Other | | Total | |
| Club | Season | Division | Apps | Goals | Apps | Goals | Apps | Goals | Apps | Goals | Apps | Goals |
|---|---|---|---|---|---|---|---|---|---|---|---|---|
| Real Sociedad C | 2015–16 | Tercera División | 31 | 0 | — | | — | | — | | 31 | 0 |
| Real Sociedad B | 2015–16 | Segunda División B | 0 | 0 | — | | — | | — | | 0 | 0 |
| Real Sociedad B | 2016–17 | Segunda División B | 4 | 0 | — | | — | | — | | 4 | 0 |
| Real Sociedad B | 2017–18 | Segunda División B | 29 | 0 | — | | — | | 2 | 0 | 31 | 0 |
| Real Sociedad B | 2018–19 | Segunda División B | 28 | 0 | — | | — | | — | | 28 | 0 |
| Real Sociedad B | 2019–20 | Segunda División B | 4 | 0 | — | | — | | — | | 4 | 0 |
| Real Sociedad B | 2021–22 | Segunda División | 21 | 0 | — | | — | | — | | 21 | 0 |
| Real Sociedad B | Total | | 86 | 0 | — | | — | | 2 | 0 | 88 | 0 |
| Real Sociedad | 2017–18 | La Liga | 0 | 0 | 0 | 0 | 0 | 0 | — | | 0 | 0 |
| Real Sociedad | 2018–19 | La Liga | 0 | 0 | 0 | 0 | — | | — | | 0 | 0 |
| Real Sociedad | 2019–20 | La Liga | 0 | 0 | 0 | 0 | — | | — | | 0 | 0 |
| Real Sociedad | 2020–21 | La Liga | 0 | 0 | — | | — | | — | | 0 | 0 |
| Real Sociedad | 2022–23 | La Liga | 0 | 0 | 1 | 0 | 0 | 0 | — | | 1 | 0 |
| Real Sociedad | Total | | 0 | 0 | 1 | 0 | 0 | 0 | — | | 1 | 0 |
| Cultural Leonesa (loan) | 2020–21 | Segunda División B | 23 | 0 | 1 | 0 | — | | — | | 24 | 0 |
| Eldense | 2023–24 | Segunda División | 10 | 0 | 0 | 0 | — | | — | | 10 | 0 |
| Mirandés (loan) | 2023–24 | Segunda División | 0 | 0 | 0 | 0 | — | | — | | 10 | 0 |
| Johor Darul Ta'zim | 2024–25 | Malaysia Super League | — | | — | | 10 | 0 | — | | 10 | 0 |
| Career total | | | 150 | 0 | 2 | 0 | 10 | 0 | 2 | 0 | 164 | 0 |

== Honours ==
Johor Darul Ta'zim

- Malaysia Super League: 2024–25
- Malaysia Cup: 2024–25
