= Hugo Novoa =

Spanish footballer (born 2003)

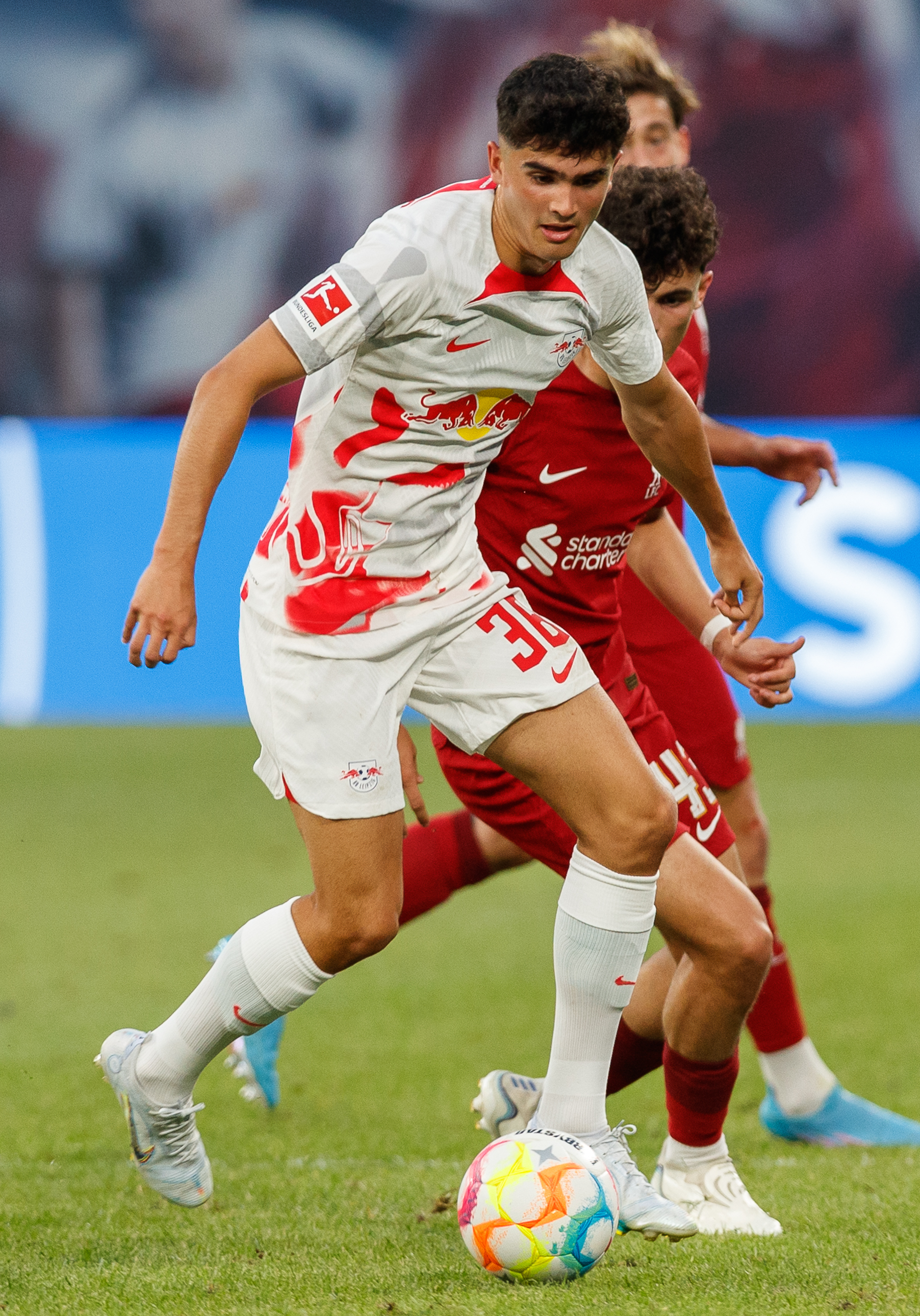
- Novoa with RB Leipzig in 2022

Personal information
- Full name: Hugo Novoa Ramos
- Date of birth: 24 January 2003 (age 23)
- Place of birth: Bertamiráns, Spain
- Height: 1.82 m (6 ft 0 in)
- Positions: Right-back; winger

Team information
- Current team: Alavés

Youth career
- 2008–2013: Bertamiráns
- 2013–2019: Deportivo La Coruña
- 2019–2021: RB Leipzig

Senior career*
Years	Team	Apps	(Gls)
2021–2024	RB Leipzig	15	(2)
2023	→ Basel (loan)	12	(1)
2023–2024	→ Utrecht (loan)	5	(0)
2024	→ Villarreal B (loan)	11	(0)
2024–	Alavés	5	(0)
2025–2026	→ Mirandés (loan)	30	(0)

International career^{‡}
2019	Spain U16	7	(0)
2019–2020	Spain U17	8	(0)
2021–2022	Spain U19	6	(0)
2022–	Spain U21	13	(1)
- * Club domestic league appearances and goals as of 9 June 2026 ‡ National team caps and goals as of 03:58, 16 October 2024 (UTC)

Hugo Novoa Ramos (born 24 January 2003) is a Spanish professional footballer who plays as a right-back or a winger for La Liga club Deportivo Alavés.

== Club career ==
=== RB Leipzig ===
Born in the village of Bertamiráns in Ames, Galicia, Novoa was formed at local Bertamiráns FC and Deportivo de La Coruña. In 2019, he turned down interest from Real Madrid, FC Barcelona and Valencia CF to join RB Leipzig.

In May 2020, having contributed five goals and eight assists to 18 games for Leipzig's under-17 team, he was moved to first-team training for the following season. On 13 August, he had his first call-up to the first team under manager Julian Nagelsmann, remaining unused for a 2–1 win over Atlético Madrid in the UEFA Champions League quarter-finals.

On 23 August 2021, Novoa made his debut in the Bundesliga as an 85th-minute substitute for Christopher Nkunku, and three minutes later scored the last goal of a 4–1 home win over SpVgg Greuther Fürth with the first touch of his professional career. He became the youngest goalscorer for Leipzig, beating Joshua Kimmich by a month. The following 21 January, he extended his contract by two year until 2024, and two days later he made his first start in a 2–0 home win over VfL Wolfsburg.

==== Loan to Basel ====
On 4 January 2023, Novoa extended his contract with Leipzig until June 2025, and subsequently joined Swiss side Basel until the end of the 2023–24 season. He joined Basel's first team during the winter break of their 2022–23 season under head coach Alex Frei. After playing in two test games, Novoa played his domestic league debut for the club, coming on in the 71st minute, during the away game in the Kybunpark on 22 January as Basel played a 1–1 draw with St. Gallen. The loan was terminated early at the end of the 2022–23 season and Novoa returned to Leipzig with the club planning to send him on a new loan elsewhere.

==== Loan to Utrecht ====
On 1 September 2023, Novoa moved on a new loan to FC Utrecht in the Netherlands. At the club, he was converted into a right-back.

==== Loan to Villarreal ====
In January 2024, Novoa joined Segunda División club Villarreal CF B on loan for the remainder of the season with an option-to-buy.

=== Alavés ===
In July 2024, Novoa joined La Liga club Deportivo Alavés on a five-year contract. He made his debut in the category on 16 August, playing the last 32 minutes in a 2–1 away loss to RC Celta de Vigo.

==== Loan to Mirandés ====
On 1 September 2025, Novoa was loaned to CD Mirandés in the second division, for one year.

== International career ==
Novoa is a youth international for Spain, having represented the under-16, under-17, under-19 and under-21 teams.

== Career statistics ==
As of match played 2 March 2024

Appearances and goals by club, season and competition
Club	Season	League			Cup		Continental		Other		Total	
Club	Season	Division	Apps	Goals	Apps	Goals	Apps	Goals	Apps	Goals	Apps	Goals
RB Leipzig	2019–20	Bundesliga	0	0	0	0	0	0	0	0	0	0
RB Leipzig	2020–21	Bundesliga	0	0	0	0	0	0	0	0	0	0
RB Leipzig	2021–22	Bundesliga	8	1	2	0	2 (Note: One appearance in UEFA Champions League, one appearance in UEFA Europa League)	0	0	0	12	1
RB Leipzig	2022–23	Bundesliga	7	1	2	0	1 (Note: Appearances in UEFA Champions League)	0	1 (Note: Appearance in DFL Supercup)	0	11	1
RB Leipzig	2023–24	Bundesliga	0	0	0	0	0	0	0	0	0	0
RB Leipzig	Total		15	2	4	0	3	0	1	0	23	2
Basel (loan)	2022–23	Swiss Super League	12	1	2	0	3 (Note: Appearances in UEFA Europa Conference League)	0	—		17	1
Utrecht (loan)	2023–24	Eredivisie	5	0	1	0	—		—		6	0
Villarreal B (loan)	2023–24	Segunda División	2	0	—		—		—		2	0
Career total			34	3	7	0	6	0	1	0	48	3

== Honours ==
RB Leipzig

- DFB-Pokal: 2021–22
- DFL-Supercup: 2023
