= Iker Álvarez =

Andorran footballer (born 2001)

Personal information
- Full name: Iker Álvarez de Eulate Molné
- Date of birth: 25 July 2001 (age 25)
- Place of birth: Andorra la Vella, Andorra
- Height: 1.90 m (6 ft 3 in)
- Position: Goalkeeper

Team information
- Current team: Córdoba
- Number: 1

Youth career
- Inter d'Escaldes
- –2016: FC Andorra
- 2016–2017: Gimnàstic Manresa
- 2017–2019: Roda

Senior career*
Years	Team	Apps	(Gls)
2019–2021	Villarreal C	29	(0)
2021–2025	Villarreal B	102	(0)
2025–	Córdoba	35	(0)

International career^{‡}
2015–2017	Andorra U17	8	(0)
2017–2019	Andorra U19	8	(0)
2018–2021	Andorra U21	11	(0)
2021–	Andorra	43	(0)
- * Club domestic league appearances and goals as of 31 May 2026 ‡ National team caps and goals as of 15 November 2026

Iker Álvarez de Eulate Molné (born 25 July 2001) is an Andorran professional footballer who plays as a goalkeeper for Spanish Segunda División club Córdoba CF and the Andorra national team.

== Club career ==
Álvarez represented Inter Club d'Escaldes, FC Andorra and Club Gimnàstic de Manresa before joining Villarreal CF's youth categories in 2017; he was initially assigned to affiliate club CD Roda. He returned to the structure of the Yellow Submarine in 2019, being assigned to the C-team in Tercera División.

Álvarez had his first call up for Villarreal's first team ahead of their UEFA Europa League last 16 second leg at home to FC Dynamo Kyiv on 18 March 2021. He remained on the bench as second-choice Sergio Asenjo played in the 2–0 (4–0 aggregate) victory.

Álvarez first appeared with the reserves on 9 May 2021, starting in a 4–3 Segunda División B home loss against FC Barcelona B. He was definitely promoted to the B's for the 2021–22 season, sharing the starting spot with Filip Jörgensen as the side achieved promotion to Segunda División.

Álvarez made his professional debut on 29 August 2022, starting in a 3–0 away loss against Granada CF. On 21 June 2023, after establishing himself as a starter for the B-team after Jörgensen was constantly involved in first team duties, he renewed his contract until 2026.

On 18 June 2025, after failing to make a breakthrough in the first team, Álvarez moved to second division side Córdoba CF on a two-year deal.

== International career ==
Álvarez made his international debut for Andorra on 28 March 2021 in a 2022 FIFA World Cup qualification match against Poland, losing 3–0 in Warsaw.

== Personal life ==
Iker is the son of former footballer Koldo Álvarez, who was capped for the Andorra national team and later appointed as the team's manager.

== Career statistics ==
=== Club ===
As of match played 17 May 2025

Appearances and goals by club, season and competition
Club	Season	League			Cup		Europe		Other		Total	
Club	Season	Division	Apps	Goals	Apps	Goals	Apps	Goals	Apps	Goals	Apps	Goals
Villarreal C	2019–20	Tercera División	12	0	—		—		—		12	0
Villarreal C	2020–21	Tercera División	17	0	—		—		—		17	0
Villarreal C	Total		29	0	—		—		—		29	0
Villarreal B	2020–21	Segunda División B	1	0	—		—		—		1	0
Villarreal B	2021–22	Primera División RFEF	18	0	—		—		2 (Note: Appearances in Primera División RFEF play-offs)	0	20	0
Villarreal B	2022–23	Segunda División	23	0	—		—		—		23	0
Villarreal B	2023–24	Segunda División	32	0	—		—		—		32	0
Villarreal B	2024–25	Primera Federación	28	0	—		—		—		28	0
Villarreal B	Total		102	0	—		—		2	0	104	0
Córdoba	2025–26	Segunda División	0	0	0	0	—		—		0	0
Career total			131	0	0	0	0	0	2	0	133	0

=== International ===
As of match played 13 November 2026

Appearances and goals by national team and year
National team	Year	Apps	Goals
Andorra	2021	5	0
Andorra	2022	6	0
Andorra	2023	10	0
Andorra	2024	8	0
Andorra	2025	8	0
Andorra	2026	6	0
Total		43	0

== Honours ==
Villarreal

- UEFA Europa League: 2020–21
