= Fran Vieites =

Spanish footballer (born 1999)

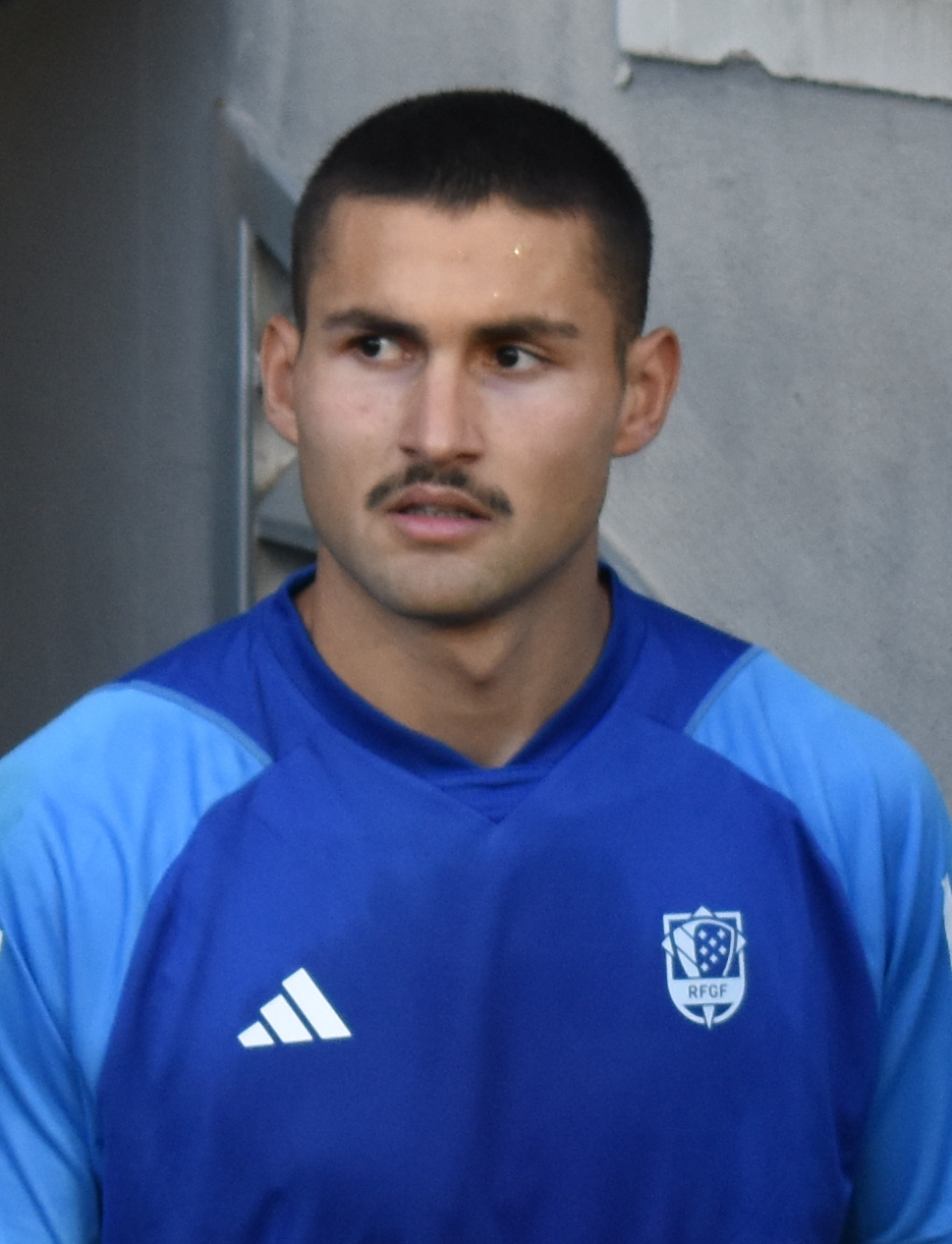
- Vieites with Galicia in 2024

Personal information
- Full name: Francisco Barbosa Vieites
- Date of birth: 7 May 1999 (age 27)
- Place of birth: Pontecesures, Spain
- Height: 1.96 m (6 ft 5 in)
- Position: Goalkeeper

Team information
- Current team: Marítimo
- Number: 30

Youth career
- Bertamiráns
- 2015–2018: Celta

Senior career*
Years	Team	Apps	(Gls)
2015	Bertamiráns	1	(0)
2018–2020	Celta B	15	(0)
2020–2022	Lugo	12	(0)
2022–2024	Betis B	43	(0)
2023–2025	Betis	8	(0)
2025–2026	Leicester City	0	(0)
2026–	Marítimo	0	(0)

International career^{‡}
2024–	Galicia	1	(0)
- * Club domestic league appearances and goals as of 5 September 2026 ‡ National team caps and goals as of 31 May 2024

Francisco Barbosa Vieites (born 7 May 1999) is a Spanish professional footballer who plays as a goalkeeper for Primeira Liga club Marítimo.

== Club career ==
Born in Pontecesures, Pontevedra, Galicia, Vieites started his career with Bertamiráns, and made his first team debut at the age of only 15 on 20 March 2015, coming on as a late substitute in a 5–0 Tercera División loss against Cerceda. On 10 June, he joined Celta and returned to the youth setup.

Vieites was promoted to the reserves ahead of the 2018–19 season, but was only a third-choice. He became a regular starter in 2019–20, contributing with 15 appearances as the league was curtailed due to the COVID-19 pandemic.

On 7 September 2020, Vieites signed a four-year contract with Segunda División side Lugo. After spending his first season as a third-choice behind Ander Cantero and Alberto Varo, he made his professional debut on 18 September 2021 by starting in a 2–1 away loss against Cartagena.

On 1 July 2022, Vieites terminated his contract with Lugo, and signed a two-year deal with Real Betis' reserves in the Segunda Federación. He made his first team – and La Liga – debut with the Verdiblancos on 16 September 2023, replacing injured Rui Silva in a 5–0 away loss to Barcelona.

On 19 February 2024, Vieites renewed his contract with the Verdiblancos until 2026, being definitely promoted to the main squad for the 2024–25 season. On 12 August of the following year, however, he terminated his link with the club.

On 6 September 2025, Vieites signed a two-year contract with Leicester City. On 8 August of the following year, he terminated his contract with the club by reaching a mutual agreement.

On 10 August 2026, Vieites signed with Marítimo in Portugal for two seasons.

== International career ==
On 31 May 2024, Vieites played in the second half of the Galicia national team friendly against Panama, which was Galicia's first match in eight years.

== Career statistics ==
As of match played 8 May 2025

Appearances and goals by club, season and competition
Club	Season	League			National cup		Europe		Total	
Club	Season	Division	Apps	Goals	Apps	Goals	Apps	Goals	Apps	Goals
Bertamiráns	2014–15	Tercera División	1	0	—		—		1	0
Celta B	2018–19	Segunda División B	0	0	—		—		0	0
Celta B	2019–20	Segunda División B	15	0	—		—		15	0
Celta B	Total		15	0	—		—		15	0
Lugo	2021–22	Segunda División	12	0	1	0	—		13	0
Betis B	2022–23	Segunda Federación	34	0	—		—		34	0
Betis B	2023–24	Segunda Federación	9	0	—		—		9	0
Betis B	Total		43	0	—		—		43	0
Betis	2023–24	La Liga	4	0	0	0	0	0	4	0
Betis	2024–25	La Liga	4	0	4	0	8 (Note: Appearances in UEFA Conference League)	0	16	0
Betis	Total		8	0	4	0	8	0	20	0
Career total			79	0	5	0	8	0	92	0

== Honours ==
Betis

- UEFA Conference League runner-up: 2024–25
