= Julián Calero =

Spanish footballer and manager

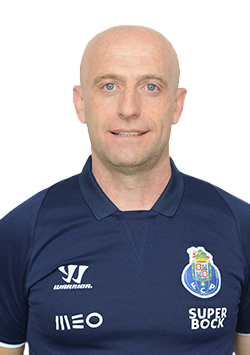
- Calero with Porto in 2015

Personal information
- Full name: Julián Calero Fernández
- Date of birth: 26 October 1970 (age 56)
- Place of birth: Madrid, Spain
- Position: Midfielder

Youth career
- Nido
- Peña el Calderillo
- Peña Atlética Becerra
- Rayo de Parla
- 1986–1988: Parla

Senior career*
Years	Team	Apps	(Gls)
1988–1992	Parla		
1992–1995	Fuenlabrada		
1995–1997	Atlético Pinto		
1997–1998	Valdemoro		
1998–1999	Alcalá	18	(0)
1999	Coslada		
1999–2000	Atlético Pinto	18	(0)

Managerial career
- 2000–2003: Parla (youth)
- 2003–2005: Atlético Madrid (youth)
- 2005–2006: Rayo Vallecano (assistant)
- 2006–2009: Real Madrid (youth)
- 2007–2009: Real Madrid B (assistant)
- 2009–2010: Alcobendas Sport
- 2010–2011: Parla
- 2011: Volga Nizhny Novgorod (assistant)
- 2011–2012: Parla
- 2012–2013: Alcorcón B
- 2013: Al Jazira (assistant)
- 2014: Atlético Pinto
- 2014–2016: Porto (assistant)
- 2016–2017: Oviedo (assistant)
- 2017–2018: Navalcarnero
- 2018: Spain (assistant)
- 2019–2020: Rayo Majadahonda
- 2020–2023: Burgos
- 2023–2024: Cartagena
- 2024–2025: Levante
- 2026: Oviedo
- * Club domestic league appearances and goals

Julian Calero Fernández (born 26 October 1970) is a Spanish manager and former player who played as a midfielder.

Following a playing career spent entirely at the amateur level, he coached mainly as an assistant, including with the Spain national team at the 2018 World Cup.

== Career ==
Born in Madrid, Calero represented Parla, Fuenlabrada, Atlético Pinto, Valdemoro, Alcalá and Coslada as a player. He began his manager career with the former's youth setup, and moved to Atlético Madrid in 2003.

Calero combined his coaching with a job as a police officer. On 11 March 2004, he was on duty at Atocha Station and was one of the first police officers to respond to the 2004 Madrid train bombings. In 2025, he spoke publicly about the psychological impact this had on him.

In 2005, Calero was appointed Míchel's assistant at Segunda División B side Rayo Vallecano. After the manager's departure to Real Madrid, he left Rayo and was named manager of Los Blancos' youth categories; he also was in the staff of the reserves, behind Juan Carlos Mandiá and Julen Lopetegui.

In October 2009, Calero replaced Juanvi Peinado at the helm of Alcobendas Sport in the Tercera División. He left the club the following May, being replaced by Alfredo Santaelena, and in October he was named at the helm of former club Parla.

Calero moved abroad for the first time in his career in May 2011, being appointed assistant to Dmitri Cheryshev at Russian Premier League side Volga Nizhny Novgorod. He subsequently returned for another spell at Parla before being appointed in charge of Alcorcón B on 26 December 2012.

In 2013, Calero served as Luis Milla's assistant at Al Jazira. On 24 March of the following year, he was appointed manager of another club he represented as a player, Atlético Pinto.

Calero was appointed assistant of Porto on 7 May 2014, behind Lopetegui. On 15 June 2016, he joined Fernando Hierro's staff at Real Oviedo.

On 3 July 2017, Calero was appointed manager of Navalcarnero in the third division. He led the club to a sixth position during the campaign, finishing two points shy of the play-offs.

Calero joined Hierro's staff at the Spain national team on 13 June 2018, being named his assistant. On 1 July of the following year, he took over Rayo Majadahonda, freshly relegated from Segunda División, but was dismissed on 3 March 2020, as the club were six points off the play-offs.

On 30 June 2020, Calero was named manager of fellow third-level side Burgos, and led the side back to Segunda División after 19 years. He made his professional level debut as a player or manager on 15 August 2021 in a 1–0 loss at Sporting de Gijón.

On 17 May 2023, after leading the club to two consecutive eleventh-place finishes, Calero announced he would departure Burgos at the end of the season. On 25 September, he replaced Víctor Sánchez at the helm of Cartagena also in the second division.

On 6 June 2024, after avoiding relegation with the Efesé, Calero announced his departure from the club, and two days later, he took over at fellow second division side Levante. He led the Granotes to a top tier promotion as champions, but was sacked on 30 November 2025, with the club in the relegation zone.

On 11 June 2026, Calero returned to Oviedo to become their new manager in the second division. On 9 November, however, he was dismissed.

== Personal life ==
Calero's son Iván is also a footballer and a midfielder.

== Managerial statistics ==
As of 7 November 2026

Managerial record by team and tenure
Team	From	To	Record								Ref
Team	From	To	G	W	D	L	GF	GA	GD	Win %	Ref
Alcobendas Sport	12 October 2009	15 May 2010	30	8	10	12	37	39	−2	26.67	
Parla	15 October 2010	19 May 2011	33	15	5	13	40	41	−1	45.45	
Parla	15 September 2011	14 June 2012	37	16	10	11	55	39	+16	43.24	
Alcorcón B	26 December 2012	24 February 2013	8	2	4	2	7	8	−1	25.00	
Atlético Pinto	26 March 2014	11 May 2014	9	3	4	2	12	12	+0	33.33	
Navalcarnero	3 July 2017	5 June 2018	38	18	7	13	44	40	+4	47.37	
Rayo Majadahonda	1 July 2019	3 March 2020	29	11	9	9	32	34	−2	37.93	
Burgos	30 June 2020	31 May 2023	116	47	31	38	110	95	+15	40.52	
Cartagena	25 September 2023	6 June 2024	38	13	11	14	32	41	−9	34.21	
Levante	8 June 2024	30 November 2025	58	25	16	17	90	75	+15	43.10	
Oviedo	11 June 2026	9 November 2026	14	6	4	4	22	19	+3	42.86	
Total			410	164	111	135	481	443	+38	40.00	—

== Honours ==
=== Manager ===
Levante

- Segunda División: 2024–25
