= Guillermo Vallejo =

Spanish footballer

Personal information
- Full name: Guillermo Vallejo Delgado
- Date of birth: 22 April 1995 (age 31)
- Place of birth: Burgos, Spain
- Height: 1.82 m (6 ft 0 in)
- Position: Goalkeeper

Team information
- Current team: Ceuta
- Number: 13

Youth career
- Burgos Promesas 2000
- 2012–2014: Numancia

Senior career*
Years	Team	Apps	(Gls)
2014–2016	Numancia B	67	(0)
2016–2018	Cultural Leonesa	23	(0)
2017–2018	→ Elche (loan)	2	(0)
2018–2019	SS Reyes	1	(0)
2019	Valladolid B	8	(0)
2019–2020	Guijuelo	25	(0)
2020–2021	Algeciras	24	(0)
2021–2024	Eldense	74	(0)
2024–	Ceuta	51	(0)
- * Club domestic league appearances and goals as of 9 June 2026

Guillermo "Guille" Vallejo Delgado (born 22 April 1995) is a Spanish professional footballer who plays as a goalkeeper for Segunda División club Ceuta.

== Club career ==
Born in Burgos, Castile and León, Vallejo joined CD Numancia's youth setup in 2012, from hometown side CD Burgos Promesas 2000. He made his senior debut with the reserves on 30 August 2014, starting in a 1–1 Tercera División home draw against Real Ávila CF.

On 9 August 2016, after two seasons as a starter, Vallejo signed for Segunda División B side Cultural y Deportiva Leonesa, mainly as a cover for injured Jorge Palatsí. He was a first-choice during most of the campaign, only losing his starting spot after Palatsí recovered, as Cultu achieved promotion to Segunda División after a 42-year absence.

On 2 August 2017, Vallejo was loaned to Elche CF also in the third division, and was a backup option to José Juan as the club returned to division two at first attempt. On 16 November 2018, after more than four months without a club, he moved to UD San Sebastián de los Reyes in the same category, but featured just once before joining fellow league team Real Valladolid Promesas the following 16 January.

On 19 June 2019, Vallejo agreed to a contract with CD Guijuelo, still in division three. After establishing himself as a starter, he moved to fellow league team Algeciras CF on 3 August 2020, where he was also a first-choice.

On 12 July 2021, Vallejo signed for Segunda División RFEF side CD Eldense. He immediately became a starter for the club, as they achieved two consecutive promotions to return to the second level after 59 years.

Vallejo made his professional debut at the age of 28 on 13 August 2023, starting in a 1–0 away win over FC Cartagena. He subsequently lost his starting spot to new signings Andoni Zubiaurre and Álvaro Aceves, before leaving the club on 30 July 2024; hours later, he signed for AD Ceuta FC in the third division.
