= Dario Đumić =

Bosnian footballer (born 1992)

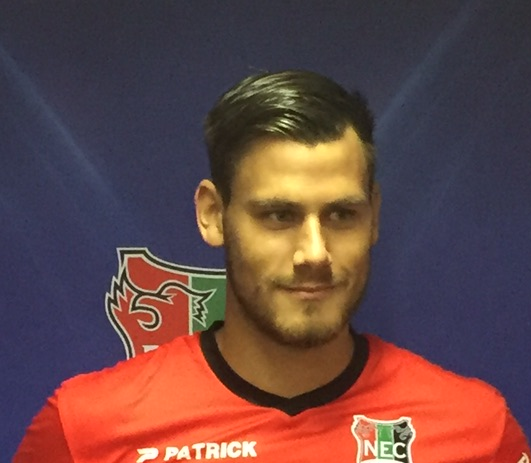

Personal information
- Date of birth: 30 January 1992 (age 34)
- Place of birth: Sarajevo, SFR Yugoslavia
- Height: 1.93 m (6 ft 4 in)
- Position: Centre-back

Youth career
- Himmelev-Veddelev
- Hvidovre
- 2008–2009: Norwich City

Senior career*
Years	Team	Apps	(Gls)
2009–2010	Norwich City	0	(0)
2010–2016	Brøndby	92	(2)
2016–2017	NEC	50	(5)
2017–2020	Utrecht	13	(0)
2018–2019	→ Dynamo Dresden (loan)	25	(1)
2019–2020	→ SV Darmstadt (loan)	33	(4)
2020–2022	Twente	28	(2)
2022–2023	SV Sandhausen	45	(5)
2023–2026	Eldense	64	(5)

International career
2008–2009	Denmark U17	12	(2)
2009–2010	Denmark U18	9	(0)
2010–2011	Denmark U19	12	(2)
2012	Denmark U20	4	(0)
2017	Bosnia and Herzegovina	5	(1)
- * Club domestic league appearances and goals as of 24 May 2026

Dario Đumić (pronounced [dâːrio dʑǔmitɕ]; born 30 January 1992) is a Bosnian professional footballer who plays as a centre-back.

Đumić started his professional career at Norwich City, before joining Brøndby in 2010. Six years later, he signed with NEC. In 2017, he was transferred to Utrecht, who loaned him to Dynamo Dresden in 2018 and to SV Darmstadt in 2019. The following year, he switched to Twente. Đumić moved to SV Sandhausen in 2022. A year later, he joined Eldense.

A former Danish youth international, Đumić made his senior international debut for Bosnia and Herzegovina in 2017, earning 5 caps.

== Club career ==
=== Early career ===
Because of the outbreak of the Bosnian War, Đumić's family fled from his native Bosnia and Herzegovina and moved to Denmark, where he started playing football at local clubs, before joining the youth academy of English team Norwich City in 2008. He made his professional debut against Swindon Town on 10 November 2009 at the age of 17.

In January 2010, Đumić moved to Brøndby. On 4 December 2011, he scored his first professional goal against Køge.

In February 2016, he switched to Dutch side NEC.

=== Utrecht ===
In July 2017, Đumić was transferred to Utrecht for an undisclosed fee. He made his official debut for the squad in the UEFA Europa League play-offs against Zenit St. Petersburg on 16 August. Two weeks later, he made his league debut against Groningen.

In June 2018, Đumić was sent on a season-long loan to German outfit Dynamo Dresden.

In July 2019, he was loaned to SV Darmstadt until the end of the campaign.

=== Twente ===
In September 2020, Đumić signed a two-year contract with Twente. He made his competitive debut for the team on 25 September against Groningen. On 17 January 2021, he scored his first goal for Twente against the same opponent.

=== Later stage of career ===
In January 2022, Đumić joined SV Sandhausen.

In August 2023, he moved to Spanish side Eldense.

== International career ==
Despite representing Denmark at various youth levels, Đumić decided to play for Bosnia and Herzegovina at the senior level.

In August 2016, his request to change sports citizenship from Danish to Bosnian was approved by FIFA. Subsequently, he received his first senior call up in March 2017, for a 2018 FIFA World Cup qualifier against Gibraltar and a friendly game against Albania. He debuted against the latter on 28 March.

On 7 October, in a 2018 FIFA World Cup qualifier against Belgium, Đumić scored his first senior international goal.

== Personal life ==
Đumić married his long-time girlfriend Caroline in June 2023. Together they have a daughter named Sophia.

He holds a Master of Laws degree from the University of Southern Denmark.

== Career statistics ==
=== Club ===
As of match played 24 May 2026

Appearances and goals by club, season and competition
Club	Season	League			National cup (Note: Includes Danish Cup, KNVB Cup, DFB-Pokal, Copa del Rey)		Continental		Other		Total	
Club	Season	Division	Apps	Goals	Apps	Goals	Apps	Goals	Apps	Goals	Apps	Goals
Norwich City	2009–10	League One	0	0	0	0	–		1 (Note: Appearance in EFL Trophy)	0	1	0
Brøndby	2011–12	Danish Superliga	14	1	0	0	0	0	–		14	1
Brøndby	2012–13	Danish Superliga	21	1	3	1	–		–		24	2
Brøndby	2013–14	Danish Superliga	24	0	1	0	–		–		25	0
Brøndby	2014–15	Danish Superliga	26	0	2	0	1 (Note: Appearance(s) in UEFA Europa League)	0	–		29	0
Brøndby	2015–16	Danish Superliga	7	0	1	0	6	0	–		14	0
Brøndby	Total		92	2	7	1	7	0	–		106	3
NEC	2015–16	Eredivisie	16	1	–		–		–		16	1
NEC	2016–17	Eredivisie	34	4	1	0	–		4 (Note: Appearances in Eredivisie relegation play-offs)	0	39	4
NEC	Total		50	5	1	0	–		4	0	55	5
Utrecht	2017–18	Eredivisie	13	0	2	0	1	0	2 (Note: Appearances in Eredivisie play-offs for UEFA Europa League)	0	18	0
Dynamo Dresden (loan)	2018–19	2. Bundesliga	25	1	1	0	–		–		26	1
SV Darmstadt (loan)	2019–20	2. Bundesliga	33	4	2	0	–		–		35	4
Twente	2020–21	Eredivisie	24	2	1	0	–		–		25	2
Twente	2021–22	Eredivisie	4	0	0	0	–		–		4	0
Twente	Total		28	2	1	0	–		–		29	2
SV Sandhausen	2021–22	2. Bundesliga	16	2	–		–		–		16	2
SV Sandhausen	2022–23	2. Bundesliga	29	3	3	0	–		–		32	3
SV Sandhausen	Total		45	5	3	0	–		–		48	5
Eldense	2023–24	Segunda División	32	2	2	0	–		–		34	2
Eldense	2024–25	Segunda División	20	3	0	0	–		–		20	3
Eldense	2025–26	Primera Federación	12	0	1	0	–		–		13	0
Eldense	Total		64	5	3	0	–		–		67	5
Career total			350	24	20	1	8	0	7	0	385	25

=== International ===
Appearances and goals by national team and year
National team	Year	Apps	Goals
Bosnia and Herzegovina
Bosnia and Herzegovina	2017	5	1
Total		5	1

Scores and results list Bosnia and Herzegovina's goal tally first, score column indicates score after each Đumić goal.

List of international goals scored by Dario Đumić
No.	Date	Venue	Cap	Opponent	Score	Result	Competition
1	7 October 2017	Grbavica, Sarajevo, Bosnia and Herzegovina	4	Belgium	3–3	3–4	2018 FIFA World Cup qualification
