= Bertamiráns FC =

Bertamiráns
- Full name: Bertamiráns Fútbol Club
- Founded: 1933
- Ground: Municipal, Ames
- Capacity: 1,000
- Chairman: (Spain) Rafael Budiño
- Manager: (Spain) Javi Touriño
- League: Primera Futgal – Group 2
- 2024–25: Primera Futgal – Group 2, 12th of 18
Home colours

Bertamiráns Fútbol Club is a Spanish football club based in Bertamiráns, Ames, A Coruña. Founded in 1933, the team plays in Primera Futgal – Group 2. The club's home ground is Municipal, an artificial-turf football pitch which replaced the original natural-grass field years ago.

From 2015 to 2023, the club kept an official collaboration agreement with Deportivo de la Coruna.

Notable players who played for Bertamirans include the likes of current Real Betis' goalkeeper Fran Vieites and RasenBallsport Leipzig's youngest-ever striker Hugo Novoa.

== Season to season ==
Season	Tier	Division	Place	Copa del Rey
1967–68	5	1ª Reg.	5th	
1968–69	5	1ª Reg.	1st	
1969–70	5	1ª Reg.	8th	
1970–71	5	1ª Reg.	8th	
1971–72	5	1ª Reg.	7th	
1972–73	5	1ª Reg.	9th	
1973–74	5	1ª Reg.	12th	
1974–75	6	2ª Reg.	7th	
1975–76	6	2ª Reg.	11th	
1976–77	6	2ª Reg.	8th	
1977–78	7	2ª Reg.	2nd	
1978–79	7	2ª Reg.	14th	
1979–80	7	2ª Reg.	18th	
1980–81	7	2ª Reg.	7th	
1981–82	7	2ª Reg.	8th	
1982–83	7	2ª Reg.	9th	
1983–84	7	2ª Reg.	9th	
1984–85	7	2ª Reg.		
1985–86	7	2ª Reg.	8th	
1986–87	7	2ª Reg.	8th	

Season	Tier	Division	Place	Copa del Rey
1987–88	7	2ª Reg.	11th	
1988–89	7	2ª Reg.	12th	
1989–90	7	2ª Reg.	5th	
1990–91	7	2ª Reg.	6th	
1991–92	DNP			
1992–93	7	2ª Reg.	6th	
1993–94	7	2ª Reg.	3rd	
1994–95	6	1ª Reg.	12th	
1995–96	6	1ª Reg.	16th	
1996–97	6	1ª Reg.	19th	
1997–98	7	2ª Reg.	18th	
1998–99	8	3ª Reg.	10th	
1999–2000	8	3ª Reg.	1st	
2000–01	7	2ª Reg.	13th	
2001–02	7	2ª Reg.	8th	
2002–03	7	2ª Reg.	5th	
2003–04	7	2ª Reg.	14th	
2004–05	7	2ª Reg.	6th	
2005–06	7	2ª Reg.	9th	
2006–07	7	2ª Aut.	3rd	

Season	Tier	Division	Place	Copa del Rey
2007–08	7	2ª Aut.	1st	
2008–09	6	1ª Aut.	13th	
2009–10	6	1ª Aut.	1st	
2010–11	5	Pref. Aut.	15th	
2011–12	5	Pref. Aut.	10th	
2012–13	5	Pref. Aut.	3rd	
2013–14	4	3ª	14th	
2014–15	4	3ª	20th	
2015–16	5	Pref.	5th	
2016–17	5	Pref.	16th	
2017–18	6	1ª Gal.	9th	
2018–19	6	1ª Gal.	17th	
2019–20	7	2ª Gal.	2nd	
2020–21	DNP			
2021–22	8	2ª Gal.	5th	
2022–23	8	2ª Gal.	2nd	
2023–24	7	1ª Gal.	11th	
2024–25	7	1ª Futgal	12th	
2025–26	7	1ª Futgal		

- 2 seasons in Tercera División
