= Álvaro Aceves =

Spanish footballer

Personal information
- Full name: Álvaro Aceves Catalina
- Date of birth: 26 July 2003 (age 23)
- Place of birth: Valladolid, Spain
- Height: 1.90 m (6 ft 3 in)
- Position: Goalkeeper

Team information
- Current team: Valladolid
- Number: 1

Youth career
- Parquesol
- 2012–2022: Valladolid

Senior career*
| Years | Team | Apps | (Gls) |
| 2021–2025 | Valladolid B | 53 | (0) |
| 2022– | Valladolid | 12 | (0) |
| 2023–2024 | → Eldense (loan) | 14 | (0) |
| 2025 | → Eldense (loan) | 2 | (0) |

International career^{‡}
| 2023– | Spain U21 | 2 | (0) |
- * Club domestic league appearances and goals as of 9 June 2026 ‡ National team caps and goals as of 03:57, 16 October 2024 (UTC)

Álvaro Aceves Catalina (born 26 July 2003) is a Spanish professional footballer who plays as a goalkeeper for Real Valladolid.

== Career ==
Aceves is a youth product of CD Parquesol before moving to Real Valladolid as a benjamín for the Íscar Cup. He was promoted to the reserves in 2021, eventually becoming their starter.

On 15 July 2022, Aceves signed a professional contract with the club until 2025. He was promoted to the senior Valladolid side as third goalkeeper for the 2022–23 season. He made his professional debut with Valladolid as a late substitute in a 2–1 La Liga loss to Real Betis in February 2023, making 3 saves and keeping a clean sheet in his cameo.

On 1 September 2023, Aceves was loaned to Segunda División side CD Eldense for the 2023–24 season. Back to Valladolid in July 2024, he stopped training with the club after his staff had a different interpretation of his contract, understanding that he was a free agent; he only returned to training in September, but was demoted back to the B-team.

On 17 January 2025, Aceves renewed his contract with the Pucelanos until 2028, and returned to Eldense on loan for the remainder of the campaign.

== International career ==
Aceves was called up to the Spain U17s in 2020, but did not make an appearance as the call-up was cut short due to the COVID-19 pandemic. He was called up to the Spain U19s in January 2022.

== Career statistics ==
As of 4 March 2024

Appearances and goals by club, season and competition
| Club | Temporada | Liga | | | Copa del Rey | | Copas europeas | | Total | |
| Club | Temporada | Division | Partidos | Goles | Partidos | Goles | Partidos | Goles | Partidos Totales | Goles |
|---|---|---|---|---|---|---|---|---|---|---|
| Valladolid B | 2021–22 | Primera Federación | 16 | 0 | — | | — | | 16 | 0 |
| Valladolid B | 2022–23 | Segunda Federación | 23 | 0 | — | | — | | 23 | 0 |
| Valladolid B | Total | | 39 | 0 | — | | — | | 39 | 0 |
| Real Valladolid | 2022–23 | La Liga | 1 | 0 | — | | — | | 1 | 0 |
| Real Valladolid | 2023–24 | Segunda División | 0 | 0 | — | | — | | 0 | 0 |
| Real Valladolid | Total | | 12 | 0 | — | | — | | 12 | 0 |
| Eldense (cedido) | 2023–24 | Segunda División | 11 | 0 | 2 | 0 | — | | 13 | 0 |
| Eldense | 2024-25 | Segunda División | 2 | 0 | 0 | 0 | - | - | 2 | 0 |
| Eldense | Total | | 13 | 0 | 2 | 0 | - | - | 15 | 0 |
| Real Valladolid | 2025-26 | Segunda División | 11 | 0 | 0 | 0 | - | - | 11 | 0 |
| Career total | | | 51 | 0 | 2 | 0 | 0 | 0 | 66 | 0 |
