= Pau Navarro =

Pau Navarro may refer to:

- Pau Navarro (footballer)
- Pau Navarro (racing driver)
