= Joel Jorquera =

Spanish footballer

Personal information
- Full name: Joel Jorquera Romero
- Date of birth: 19 August 2000 (age 26)
- Place of birth: Castelldefels, Spain
- Height: 1.71 m (5 ft 7 in)
- Position: Winger

Team information
- Current team: Real Murcia
- Number: 19

Youth career
- 2012–2017: Gavà
- 2017–2019: Europa

Senior career*
Years	Team	Apps	(Gls)
2019–2020	Europa	24	(3)
2019	Europa B	1	(1)
2020–2023	Cádiz B	44	(4)
2020–2021	→ Hospitalet (loan)	27	(1)
2023–2025	Eldense	53	(4)
2025–	Moreirense	16	(1)
2026	→ Real Murcia (loan)	18	(5)
2026-	Real Murcia	0	(0)
- * Club domestic league appearances and goals as of 8 September 2026

Joel Jorquera Romero (born 19 August 2000) is a Spanish professional footballer who plays as a winger for Primera Federación club Real Murcia.

== Club career ==
Jorquera was born in Castelldefels, Barcelona, Catalonia, and represented CF Gavà's youth team EF Gavà and CE Europa as a youth. He made his senior debut with the latter's first team on 28 April 2019, coming on as a second-half substitute in a 2–1 Tercera División home win over Cerdanyola del Vallès FC.

Jorquera scored his first senior goal on 13 October 2019, netting Europa's fourth in a 4–0 home routing of Santfeliuenc FC. On 8 August of the following year, he moved to Cádiz CF on a three-year contract, being initially assigned to the reserves in Segunda División B, but was loaned to fellow third tier side CE L'Hospitalet on 3 October.

Upon returning in July 2021, Jorquera was again assigned to Cádiz's B-team in Segunda División RFEF, featuring regularly. On 11 January 2023, he signed for Primera Federación side CD Eldense, and finished the campaign with two goals in 15 appearances overall as the club returned to Segunda División after 59 years.

Jorquera made his professional debut on 28 August 2023, replacing David Timor late into a 2–1 home win over SD Eibar. He scored his first professional goal on 1 September of the following year, netting the opener in a 2–1 home loss to FC Cartagena.

On 27 January 2025, Jorquera moved abroad for the first time in his career, after signing a two-and-a-half-year contract with Moreirense FC of the Portuguese Primeira Liga. One year later, after scoring 1 goal in 16 appearances for the Moreira de Cónegos-based club, Jorquera was sent on loan to Primera Federación club Real Murcia until the end of the season.
