= Antonio Espigares =

Spanish footballer

Personal information
- Full name: Antonio Espigares Morillas
- Date of birth: 5 September 2004 (age 22)
- Place of birth: Granada, Spain
- Height: 1.87 m (6 ft 2 in)
- Position: Centre back

Team information
- Current team: Gil Vicente
- Number: 3

Youth career
- 2014–2019: Granada
- 2019–2022: Villarreal

Senior career*
Years	Team	Apps	(Gls)
2022–2023	Villarreal C	9	(0)
2022–2023	→ Real Unión (loan)	24	(1)
2023–2025	Villarreal B	67	(0)
2025–	Gil Vicente	19	(1)

International career
2021–2022	Spain U18	3	(0)
- * Club domestic league appearances and goals as of 25 May 2026

Antonio Espigares Morillas (born 5 September 2004) is a Spanish footballer who plays as a centre-back for Primeira Liga club Gil Vicente.

== Club career ==
Espigares was born in Granada, Andalusia, and joined Villarreal CF's youth setup in 2019, from hometown side Granada CF. He made his senior debut with the C-team on 12 March 2022, starting in a 1–1 Tercera División RFEF away draw against CD Castellón B.

On 25 August 2022, Espigares was loaned to Primera Federación side Real Unión for the season. He scored his first senior goal on 8 December, netting the winner in a 1–0 away success over CE Sabadell FC.

Back to the Yellow Submarine in July 2023, Espigares renewed his contract until 2027 on 17 August, and made his professional debut with the reserves four days later, starting in a 3–1 Segunda División home win over CD Eldense. He became a first-choice for the B's during the campaign, as they suffered relegation.

On 26 June 2025, Espigares moved abroad for the first time in his career, signing a four-year deal with Portuguese Primeira Liga side Gil Vicente FC.

== International career ==
Espigares represented Spain at under-18 level.

== Career statistics ==
As of match played 24 May 2025

Appearances and goals by club, season and competition
Club	Season	League			Cup		Europe		Other		Total	
Club	Season	Division	Apps	Goals	Apps	Goals	Apps	Goals	Apps	Goals	Apps	Goals
Villarreal C	2021–22	Tercera Federación	9	0	—		—		—		9	0
Real Unión (loan)	2022–23	Primera Federación	24	1	2	0	—		—		26	1
Villarreal B	2023–24	Segunda División	31	0	—		—		—		31	0
Villarreal B	2024–25	Primera Federación	36	0	—		—		—		36	0
Villarreal B	Total		67	0	—		—		—		67	0
Villarreal	2024–25	La Liga	0	0	0	0	—		—		0	0
Career total			100	1	2	0	0	0	0	0	102	1
