= Iván Chapela =

Spanish footballer

Personal information
- Full name: Iván Chapela López
- Date of birth: 21 May 1999 (age 27)
- Place of birth: Chiclana, Spain
- Height: 1.70 m (5 ft 7 in)
- Position: Winger

Team information
- Current team: Tenerife
- Number: 24

Youth career
- Sancti Petri
- 2012–2017: Valencia
- 2017–2018: Málaga

Senior career*
Years	Team	Apps	(Gls)
2018	Málaga B	1	(0)
2018–2022	Cádiz B	90	(12)
2021–2023	Cádiz	9	(0)
2022–2023	→ Unionistas (loan)	35	(8)
2023–2025	Eldense	70	(13)
2025–2026	Burgos	4	(0)
2026–	Tenerife	9	(1)

International career
2015	Spain U17	2	(0)
- * Club domestic league appearances and goals as of 9 June 2026

Iván Chapela López (born 21 May 1999) is a Spanish footballer who plays as a left winger for CD Tenerife.

== Club career ==
Born in Chiclana de la Frontera, Cádiz, Andalusia, Chapela joined Valencia CF's youth setup at the age of 13, from APA Sancti Petri. In 2017, after struggling with injuries, he left the club and moved to Málaga CF.

Chapela made his senior debut with Málaga's B-team on 22 February 2018, coming on as a late substitute for goalscorer Jaime Moreno in a 2–1 Tercera División home win over Loja CD. On 1 August, he signed a three-year contract with Cádiz CF, being initially assigned to the reserves also in the fourth division.

On 15 January 2021, after becoming a regular starter for the B-team, Chapela renewed his contract with Cádiz until 2022. He made his first team – and La Liga – debut on 2 October, replacing Jens Jønsson in a 0–0 home draw against Valencia CF.

On 1 September 2022, Chapela was loaned to Primera Federación side Unionistas de Salamanca CF for the season. On 9 July of the following year, he signed a two-year contract with CD Eldense, newly-promoted to Segunda División.

On 19 June 2025, after suffering relegation, Chapela agreed to a two-year deal with Burgos CF also in the second division. After being rarely used, he terminated his link the following 2 February, and joined CD Tenerife in the third division on a two-and-a-half-year contract just hours later.
