= Abraham del Moral =

Spanish footballer

Abraham
Personal information
- Full name: Abraham del Moral Rando
- Date of birth: 5 July 2001 (age 25)
- Place of birth: Martos, Spain
- Height: 1.83 m (6 ft 0 in)
- Position: Centre back

Team information
- Current team: Ruch Chorzów
- Number: 3

Youth career
- 2007–2012: Martos
- 2012–2014: Tosiria
- 2014–2016: Jaén
- 2016–2019: Córdoba
- 2019–2020: Villarreal

Senior career*
| Years | Team | Apps | (Gls) |
| 2018–2019 | Córdoba B | 17 | (1) |
| 2020–2023 | Villarreal C | 61 | (3) |
| 2022–2024 | Villarreal B | 29 | (0) |
| 2024–2025 | Hércules | 13 | (0) |
| 2025–2026 | Teruel | 29 | (1) |
| 2026– | Ruch Chorzów | 0 | (0) |
- * Club domestic league appearances and goals as of 18:59, 2 June 2026 (UTC)

Abraham del Moral Rando (born 5 July 2001), simply known as Abraham, is a Spanish professional footballer who plays as a central defender for I liga club Ruch Chorzów.

== Club career ==
Born in Martos, Jaén, Andalusia, Abraham represented Martos CD, CD Tosiria and Real Jaén as a youth before joining Córdoba CF's youth setup in 2016. He made his senior debut with the reserves on 2 December 2018, starting in a 1–1 Tercera División away draw against Betis Deportivo Balompié.

On 5 June 2019, Abraham moved to Villarreal CF and returned to the youth setup. He was promoted to the C-team also in the fourth division ahead of the 2020–21 campaign, and immediately became a regular starter.

Abraham spent the 2022 pre-season with the reserves, and made his professional debut on 29 August of that year, starting in a 3–0 away loss against Granada CF.

On 9 August 2024, Abraham signed with Hércules in Primera Federación.
