= Unquera =

Settlement in Val de San Vicente, Cantabria, Spain

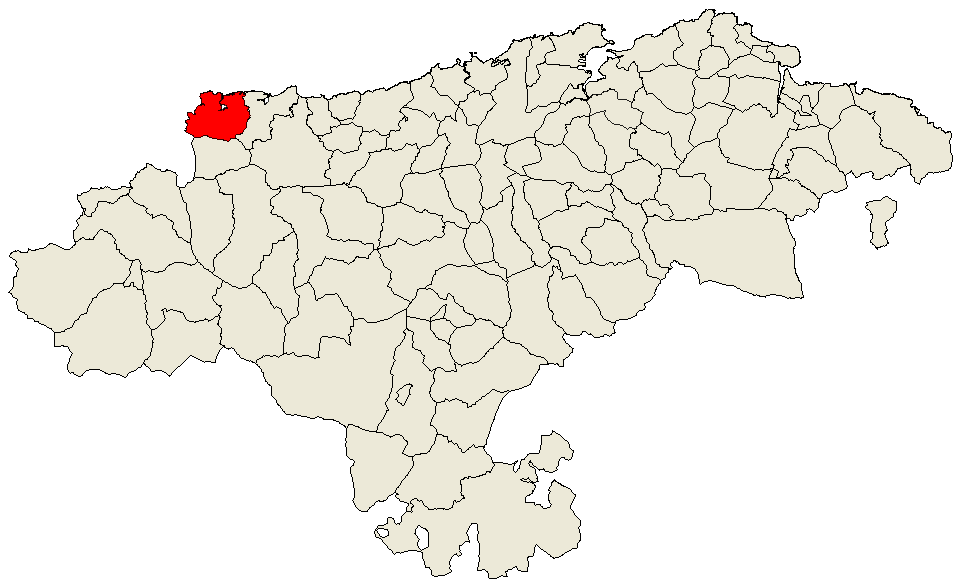
Municipality of Val de San Vicente in Cantabria.

Unquera is a village with 803 inhabitants (INE 2005) in the municipality of Val de San Vicente, in the west of the province of Cantabria, Spain. Sitting on the river Tina Menor, at the mouth of the river Deva it borders Asturias. It is famous throughout Spain for its tie pastries. Unquera is also known as the entrance to the Hermida gorge, the most usual way to access the Liébana district, which has become the main throughway of the town. This route is also part of the Camino Lebaniego, which links the Caminos de Santiago of the North and French routes.

The population depends in part on Pesués, the municipal capital, where the town hall, the barracks of the Guardia Civil and the primary school are located.

== History ==
During the ancien régime, the municipality of Val de San Vicente belonged to nobles of the house of the Marquises of Aguilar de Campoo. However, Unquera as a locality has a very short life historically by European calculations. It did not appear on the map of Coello until 1861, although the Unquera Cove is mentioned as being in the estuary of the river Tina Mayor. Unquera may have developed at the end of the 19th century thanks to the improvement of communications, especially by the railroad, and for the commercial boom of the region, possible after the opening of the gorge road (later N-621) in 1863. This road was used as a way to export, through the Unquera inlet, raw materials from Liébana and the La Hermida gorge to England, Belgium and (Germany). In 1881 Unquera is already cited as a village at the bottom of Tina Mayor. Since then Unquera has grown linearly around the road, and also parallel to the estuary, where it has a river walk.

== Economy ==
The food industry stands out for the main industry, represented mainly by the brand Pindal (others being others such as Canal and Sanbar). Canneries in this industry has existed since the 19th century in Unquera and are still maintaining active manufacturing of preserves and pickling.

== Transportation ==
Unquera has the following ground transportation:

- Line of FEVE, which links the population with Santander and with Asturias.
- Autovía del Cantábrico, for which one of the accesses is located next to the town.
- Bus lines, among which stands out the line of ALSA Irún – Santiago de Compostela, which takes Unquera as one of its stops
- Road N-621, which links León and Unquera, the most usual route to access Potes and the only one from the coast Cantabrian.
