= Val de San Vicente =

Coordinates: 43°22′39″N 4°29′01″W

- Flag Coat of arms

- Location in Spain.
- Country: Spain
- Autonomous community: Cantabria

Area
  - Total: 50.9 km^{2} (19.7 sq mi)
- Elevation: 50 m (160 ft)

Population (2025-01-01)
  - Total: 2,775
  - Density: 54.5/km^{2} (141/sq mi)
- Time zone: UTC+1 (CET)
  - Summer (DST): UTC+2 (CEST)
- Website: www.aytovaldesanvicente.com

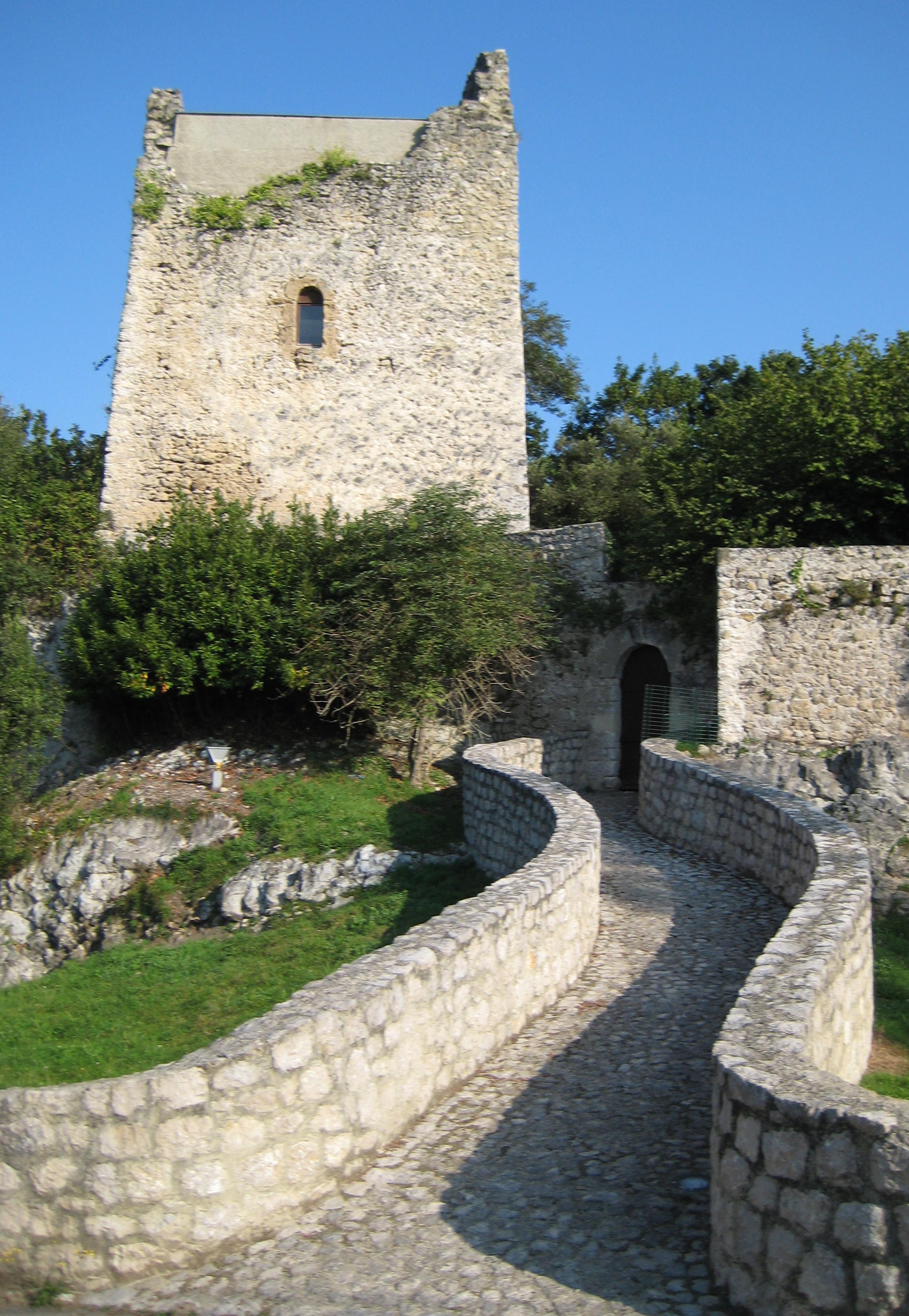
View of Val de San Vicente

Val de San Vicente is a municipality located in the autonomous community of Cantabria, Spain.

== Geography ==
Val de San Vicente is the westernmost municipality of the Cantabrian coast. Its border to the north is the Bay of Biscay, to the west the Asturian council of Ribadedeva, to the south Herrerías and to the east San Vicente de la Barquera.

The town is located at the mouth of the Deva and Nansa rivers, which empty their waters into the sea in the Tina Mayor and Tina Menor estuaries respectively.

== Economy, transportation ==
The main economic activity results from tourism due to the area´s great scenic value. The municipality's other source of income on the other hand is the food industry with "corbatas", a traditional puff pastry shaped like "bowties" in Unquera or San Vicente de la Barquera. Depending on the area within Cantabria, the pastry is known by different names, like "polkas" in Torrelavega and "sacristanes" in Liérganes.

The town is crossed by the Cantabrian Highway and served by the FEVE Santander-Oviedo railway line. The main road which connects the region of Liébana with the coast and the rest of Cantabria, originates in Unquera.

During the Old Regime, the town belonged to the Marquises of Aguilar de Campoo as a manor.

== History ==
In April 1973 it was announced that "Electra de Viesgo" was going to build the nuclear power plant of Santillán, with four units at four million kilowatts, and an initial cost calculated at 80,000 million pesetas. The company acquired 71.6 hectares of land, the equivalent of 71 soccer fields, in a coastal strip which covered the surface of the municipalities of San Vicente de la Barquera and Val de San Vicente, next to the cove of the beach of La Fuente. On the cliffs of Santillán-Boria a ditch was constructed to carry out the preliminary surveys for the construction of the nuclear power plant. It was scheduled to begin the production of power in 1982, with an output of 970 megawatts. Finally, due to political and social opposition from Cantabria and Asturias, the power company abandoned the project.

== Demographics ==
Demographic development
1900	1910	1920	1930	1940	1950	1960	1970	1980	1990	2000	2006	2011
2.570	2.749	2.575	2.641	2.892	3.026	3.081	2.777	2.408	2.621	2.560	2.670	2.846

Source: Instituto Nacional de Estadística (España) (INE)

== Locations ==
Its 2.670 inhabitant per the Instituto Nacional de Estadística (España) (INE) census from 2006 lived in:

- Abanillas, 81 inhabitants
- Estrada, 22 inhabitants
- Helgueras, 74 inhabitants
- Luey, 179 inhabitants
- Molleda, 187 inhabitants
- Muñorrodero, 95 inhabitants
- Pechón, 215 inhabitants.
- Pesués (Capital), 376inhabitants
- Portillo, 78 inhabitants
- Prellezo, 212 inhabitants
- Prío, 85 inhabitants
- San Pedro de las Baheras, 63 inhabitants
- Serdio, 184 inhabitants
- Unquera, 819 inhabitants

== Administration ==
As of 2015, Roberto Escobedo from the Partido Socialista de Cantabria(PSC-PSOE) has been the mayor of the municipality, succeeding Miguel González Vega, who had resigned in March 2012 because he was elected senator in the 2011 national elections. The following tables show the results of the Elections in Spain held in the year 2003 and 2007. In the elections of 2011, the PSOE was again the winner with 55.6% of the votes and 7 councilors. The PP received 3 council seats and the PRC one.

== Heritage ==
The municipality includes the following sites of cultural interest:

- The 'Torre de Estrada', in Estrada, a monument.
- 'Cueva de la Fuente del Salín,' in Muñorrodero, an archaeological site.
- The Castro de Castillo,' in Prellezo, an archaeological site.
- 'Ruta Lebaniega', which links the Camino de Santiago of the coast with the Camino Francés - connecting, apart from this municipality, those of San Vicente de la Barquera, Herrerias, Lamasón, Cillorigo de Liébana, Potes, Cabezón de Liébana, Camaleño and Vega de Liébana.

In addition, the 'ruins of the old medieval church of the cemetery'in Portillo are a site of local interest.
