= Nuevo Pepico Amat =

Multi-use stadium in Ibiza, Spain

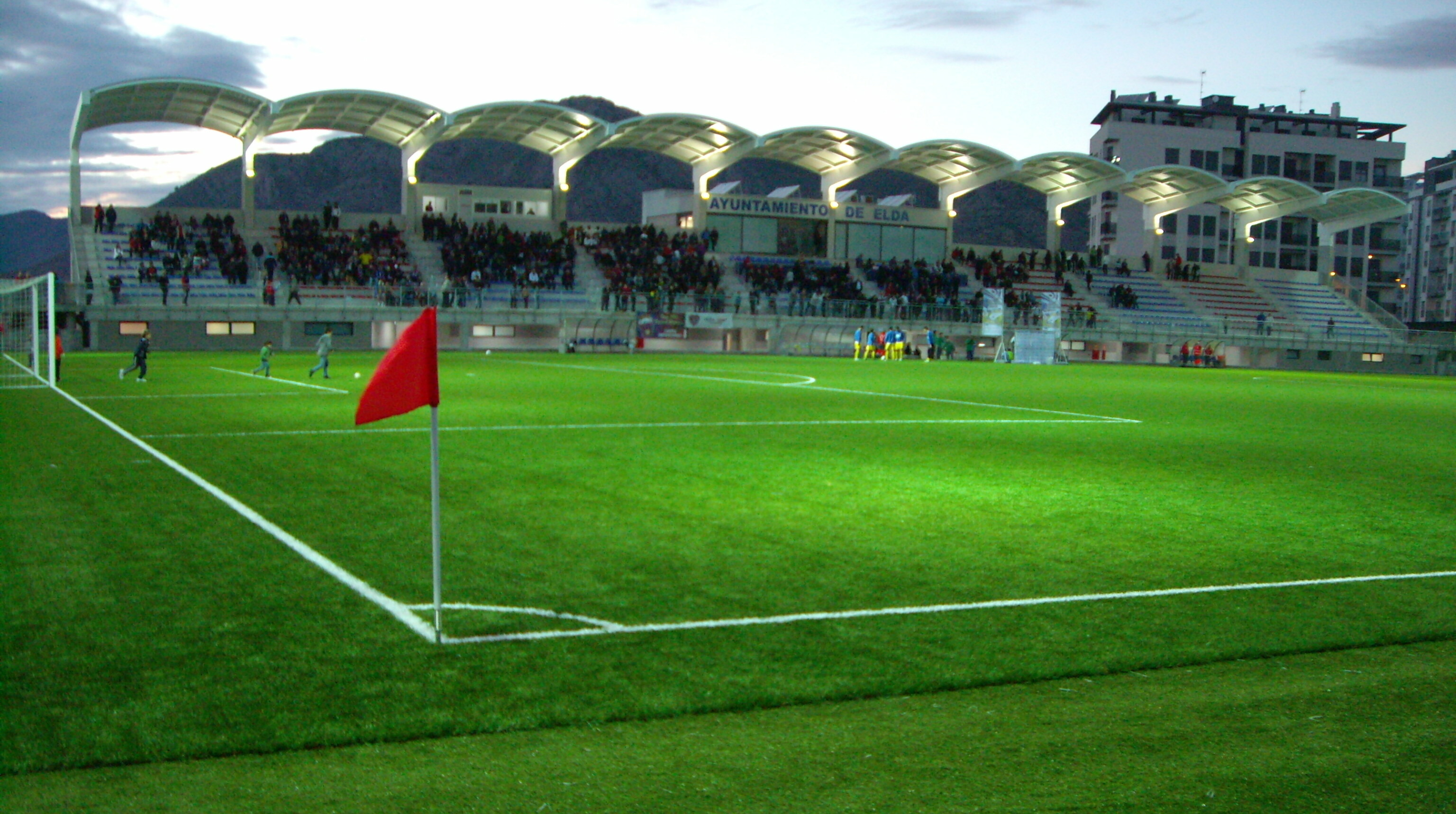
- Nuevo Pepico Amat in November 2012 UEFA
- Interactive map of Nuevo Pepico Amat
- Full name: Estadio Municipal Nuevo Pepico Amat
- Address: Calle Heidelberg / Avenida de Ronda
- Location: Elda, Spain
- Coordinates: 38°28′03″N 0°47′46″W
- Owner: Elda City Council
- Operator: Eldense
- Capacity: 5,776
- Surface: Natural grass
- Field size: 105x70m

Construction
- Built: 2012
- Opened: 30 September 2012
- Renovated: 2021 (switched to natural grass)
- Cost: € 4.5 million

Tenant
- CD Eldense (2012–)

The Estadio Municipal Nuevo Pepico Amat is a multi-use stadium located in Elda, Alicante, Valencian Community, Spain. It has a capacity of 5,776 and is currently used for football matches and is the home of CD Eldense.

== History ==
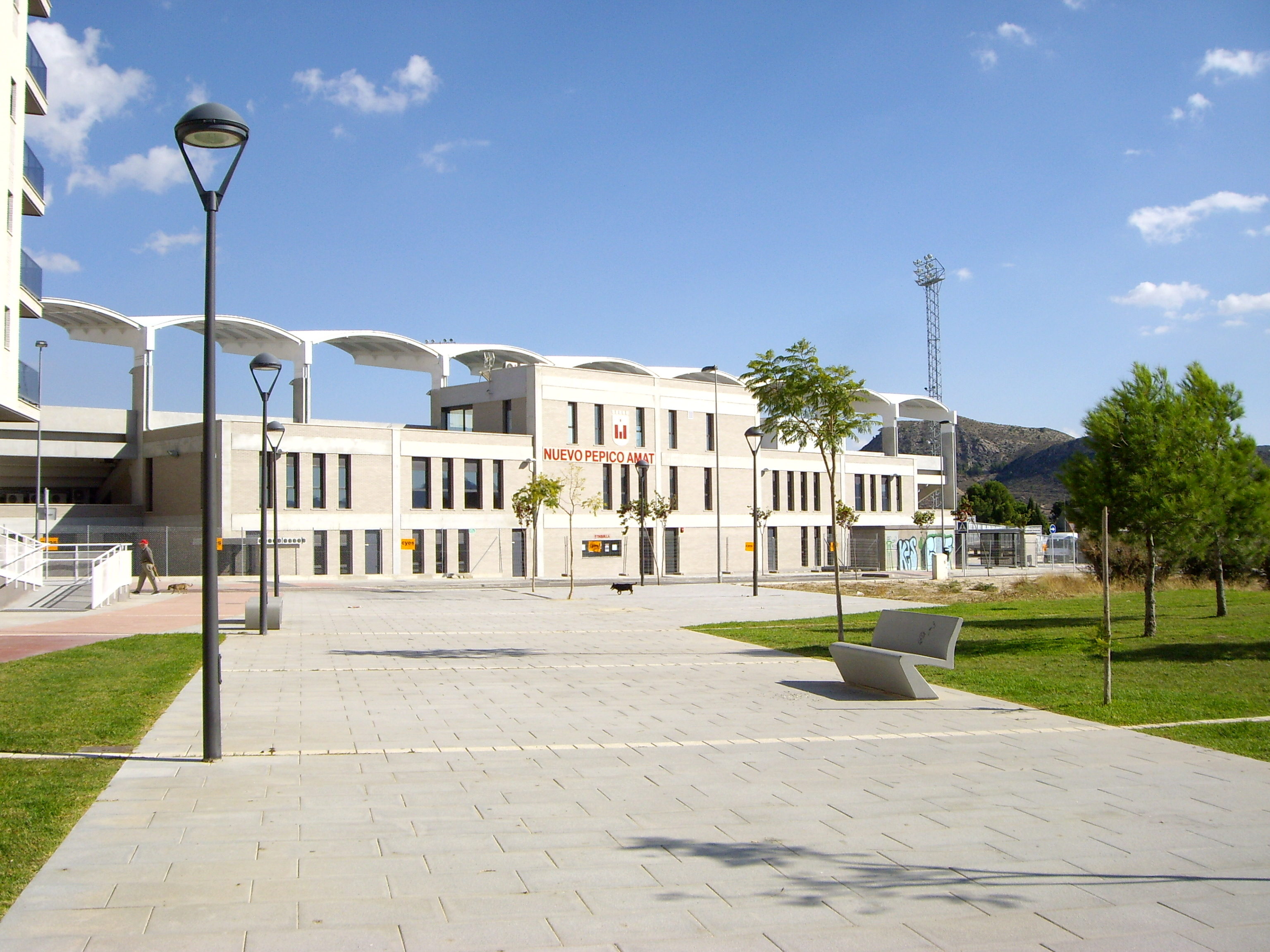
The entrance of the stadium in February 2011

In 2011, the Elda City Council began constructions to build a new stadium 300 meters away from Estadio Municipal Pepico Amat, attempting to turn the grounds of the old stadium into a commercial center. The cost of the new stadium reached € 4,5 million, and took the name of its replacement, being called "Nuevo Pepico Amat". Home tenants CD Eldense played their last match in the "old" Pepico Amat on 29 August 2012, a 0–0 draw against Orihuela CF.

The new stadium was opened on 30 September 2012, as Eldense faced CF Borriol in a Tercera División match, with Cristian Algaba scoring the only goal of the afternoon as José Arastey's side won 1–0; even though mayor Adela Pedrosa gave the initial kick-off, the stadium was never officially inaugurated. Initially built with artificial grass and being rated a 2-star UEFA stadium, the stadium switched to a natural grass in August 2021.

The stadium is named after Pepico Amat, a former football manager and player born in the city, who played in La Liga for RCD Espanyol, and also played and coached Eldense.
