= Juanto Ortuño =

Spanish footballer

Juanto
Personal information
- Full name: Juan Tomás Ortuño Martínez
- Date of birth: 11 February 1992 (age 34)
- Place of birth: Yecla, Spain
- Height: 1.77 m (5 ft 10 in)
- Position: Forward

Team information
- Current team: Murcia
- Number: 8

Youth career
- Albacete

Senior career*
Years	Team	Apps	(Gls)
2011	Albacete B	5	(2)
2011–2012	Villarreal C	23	(5)
2012–2014	Villarreal B	84	(31)
2014	Murcia	0	(0)
2014–2015	Sabadell	14	(2)
2015	UCAM Murcia	6	(2)
2015–2016	Llagostera	10	(3)
2016	Belenenses	12	(4)
2016	Ponferradina	16	(3)
2017–2018	Belenenses	17	(2)
2018–2019	Lleida Esportiu	54	(22)
2019–2020	Córdoba	18	(3)
2020–2022	Castellón	52	(11)
2022–2025	Eldense	105	(27)
2025–2026	Ceuta	8	(0)
2026–	Murcia	10	(2)
- * Club domestic league appearances and goals as of 10 June 2026

Juan Tomás Ortuño Martínez (born 11 February 1992), commonly known as Juanto, is a Spanish professional footballer who plays as a forward for Primera Federación club Murcia.

== Club career ==
Born in Yecla, Region of Murcia, Juanto joined Villarreal CF in 2011 following a brief period with Albacete Balompié, being initially assigned to the C team. On 21 January 2012 he made his Segunda División debut, starting for the reserves in a 1–0 away loss against Deportivo de La Coruña.

Juanto scored his first goal as a professional on 3 March 2012, playing 28 minutes of the 4–3 home win over CD Alcoyano. He contributed 16 games during the season, as both the first and the second teams dropped down a level.

Over the next two campaigns, Juanto scored 31 goals in 68 division three games, including all four of his team's efforts on 13 January 2013 in a defeat of CF Reus Deportiu, and a hat-trick on 17 February against UE Llagostera. He had one call-up to the main squad, remaining an unused substitute in the 1–1 La Liga home draw with Elche CF on 30 March 2014.

On 17 July 2014, Juanto signed a two-year deal with Real Murcia CF from the second tier. However, after the club's administrative relegation, he cut ties with it and moved to CE Sabadell FC also in that tier. He scored twice during his tenure, equalising for a 1–1 draw at Real Zaragoza on 14 September and getting the only goal then being sent off in a home victory over SD Ponferradina six days later, in an eventual relegation.

On 9 April 2015, Juanto terminated his contract with the Catalans and joined UCAM Murcia CF in the third division hours later. On 14 July, he signed with second-tier side Llagostera; in the following transfer window, however, he was released, and moved to Portugal after agreeing to a one-and-a-half-year deal with C.F. Os Belenenses. He made his Primeira Liga debut on 24 January, replacing Rafael Amorim at half-time and scoring in a 3–3 draw against Vitória S.C. at the Estádio do Restelo.

Juanto joined SD Ponferradina on 9 August 2016, after cutting ties with Belenenses. On 4 January 2017 he left by mutual consent, and returned to his previous club the next day.

Juanto left Belenenses on 2 January 2018, and returned to his country with Lleida Esportiu two days later. He moved to fellow second-tier team Córdoba CF on 29 June 2019, signing for CD Castellón in the same league the following 8 January.

Juanto helped the Valencians to promote with eight goals in just 12 matches, but was sparingly used afterwards. On 22 June 2022, he agreed to a contract at Primera Federación side CD Eldense, achieving another promotion as the latter returned to division two after 59 years; he scored the decisive goal in the playoffs, equalising the 3–3 extra time draw against Real Madrid Castilla in the second leg of the final (4–4 aggregate).

On 30 June 2025, Ortuño signed a two-year deal with AD Ceuta FC. He left on 2 February 2026, however, and returned to Murcia later that day.

== Personal life ==
Juanto's older brother, Alfredo, was also a footballer and a forward. He too was brought up at Albacete.
