= 2023–24 Segunda División =

93rd season of the second-tier football league in Spain

La Liga 2
- Season: 2023–24
- Dates: 11 August 2023 – 23 June 2024
- Champions: Leganés
- Promoted: Leganés; Valladolid; Espanyol
- Relegated: Alcorcón; Amorebieta; Andorra; Villarreal B
- Matches: 462
- Goals: 1,039 (2.25 per match)
- Top goalscorer: Martin Braithwaite (22 goals)
- Biggest home win: Leganés 6–0 Amorebieta (15 October 2023)
- Biggest away win: Levante 1–4 Espanyol (8 September 2023); Villarreal B 0–3 Mirandés (21 October 2023); Villarreal B 0–3 Sporting Gijón (4 November 2023); Cartagena 0–3 Leganés (5 November 2023); Eldense 0–3 Tenerife (2 December 2023); Cartagena 0–3 Burgos (16 December 2023); Mirandés 0–3 Huesca (26 February 2024)
- Highest scoring: Racing Ferrol 5–4 Albacete (3 December 2023)
- Longest winning run: 5 matches Zaragoza; Valladolid; Eibar
- Longest unbeaten run: 9 matches Eibar
- Longest winless run: 9 matches Cartagena
- Longest losing run: 4 matches Villarreal B
- Highest attendance: 27,208; Zaragoza 1–1 Racing Santander (15 September 2023)
- Lowest attendance: 0 Espanyol 2–0 Racing Santander (19 August 2023)
- Attendance: 4,834,107 (10,463 per match)
- All statistics correct as of 4 February 2024.

The 2023–24 La Liga 2, also known as LALIGA HYPERMOTION due to sponsorship reasons, was the 93rd season of the Segunda División since its establishment in Spain. It commenced on 11 August 2023 and ended on 23 June 2024.

== Teams ==
=== Team changes ===
Promoted from 2022–23 Primera Federación	Relegated from 2022–23 La Liga	Promoted to 2023–24 La Liga	Relegated to 2023–24 Primera Federación
Amorebieta; Racing Ferrol; Alcorcón; Eldense	Elche; Espanyol; Valladolid	Granada; Las Palmas; Alavés	Málaga; Ponferradina; Ibiza; Lugo

=== Promotion and relegation (pre-season) ===
A total of 22 teams will contest the league, including 15 sides from the 2022–23 season, three relegated from the 2022–23 La Liga, and four promoted from the 2022–23 Primera División RFEF.

Teams promoted to La Liga

The first two teams to earn promotion from Segunda División were Granada and Las Palmas, who secured first and second positions, respectively, on the very last match day of the season. Granada returned to La Liga after a one-year absence, while Las Palmas came back after a five-year absence. The third and final team to be promoted were Alavés, after winning the play-off final against Levante on 17 June 2023, returning after a onе-year absence.

Teams relegated from La Liga

The first team to be relegated from La Liga were Elche, after a 2–1 loss to Almería on 2 May 2023, ending their three years stay in the top tier. The second team to be relegated was Espanyol, after a 2–2 draw against Valencia on 28 May 2023, ending their two years stay in top tier. The third and final team relegated to Segunda was Valladolid, after a 0–0 draw against Getafe on 4 June 2023, ending their one-year stay in top tier.

Teams relegated to Primera Federación

On 23 April 2023, Lugo became the first team to be relegated from Segunda División, ending their 11-year stay in the second division. Lugo was followed by Ibiza on 28 April, ending a two-year stay in the second division. On 14 May 2023, Ponferradina became the third team to be relegated from Segunda División, ending a four-year stay in the second division. On 20 May 2023, Málaga became the last team to be relegated from Segunda División. This ended a 25-year streak in professional football, spending 17 of those seasons in La Liga.

Teams promoted from Primera Federación

On 27 May 2023, The first two teams to earn promotion from Primera Federación were Racing Ferrol and Amorebieta, who secured the first position in their respective groups, on the very last match day of the season. Racing Ferrol returned to Segunda División after spending 15 years in the third and fourth divisions, while Amorebieta returned after a one-year absence. On 24 June 2023, Alcorcón became the third team to secure promotion to Segunda División, returning after a one-year absence. On 25 June 2023, Eldense became the final team promoted to Segunda División, returning for the first time in 59 years and achieving three consecutive promotions.

=== Stadiums and locations ===
Location of teams in 2023–24 Segunda División
Location of teams in 2022–23 Segunda División (Canary Islands)

Team	Location	Stadium	Capacity
Albacete	Albacete	Estadio Carlos Belmonte	17,524
Alcorcón	Alcorcón	Estadio Municipal de Santo Domingo	5,100
Amorebieta	Amorebieta-Etxano	Instalaciones de Lezama Campo 2 (Note: On 17 June 2021, Amorebieta reached an agreement with Athletic Bilbao to play at Lezama, since their home ground, Urritxe, was deemed "impractical" to play in the category.)	3,200
Andorra (Note: Andorra is an Andorran club playing in the Spanish football league system.)	Andorra la Vella	Estadi Nacional	3,347
Burgos	Burgos	Estadio Municipal El Plantío	12,194
Cartagena	Cartagena	Estadio Cartagonova	15,105
Eibar	Eibar	Estadio Municipal de Ipurúa	8,164
Elche	Elche	Estadio Martínez Valero	33,732
Eldense	Elda	Estadio Municipal Nuevo Pepico Amat	4,036
Espanyol	Cornellà de Llobregat	Stage Front Stadium	40,000
Huesca	Huesca	Estadio El Alcoraz	9,100
Leganés	Leganés	Estadio Municipal Butarque	12,450
Levante	Valencia	Estadi Ciutat de València	26,354
Mirandés	Miranda de Ebro	El Estadio Municipal de Anduva	5,759
Oviedo	Oviedo	Estadio Carlos Tartiere	30,500
Racing Ferrol	Ferrol	Estadio Municipal de A Malata	12,043
Racing Santander	Santander	Campos de Sport de El Sardinero	22,222
Sporting Gijón	Gijón	Estadio Municipal El Molinón - Enrique Castro "Quini"	29,371
Tenerife	Santa Cruz de Tenerife	Estadio Heliodoro Rodríguez López	22,824
Valladolid	Valladolid	Estadio José Zorrilla	27,618
Villarreal B	Villarreal	Estadio de la Cerámica	23,000
Zaragoza	Zaragoza	Estadio de La Romareda	33,608

=== Personnel and sponsorship ===
Team	Manager	Captain	Kit manufacturer	Shirt main sponsor
Albacete	(Spain) Alberto González	(Spain) Bernabé Barragán	Adidas	Iner Energía
Alcorcón	(Tunisia) Mehdi Nafti	(Martinique) Jean-Sylvain Babin	Kappa	Distribuciones Casamayor
Amorebieta	(Spain) Jandro Castro	(Spain) Iker Seguín	Nike	Sidenor
Andorra	(Spain) Ferran Costa	(Spain) Rubén Bover	Nike	Mora Banc
Burgos	(Spain) Bolo	(Spain) Unai Elgezabal	Adidas	Reale Seguros
Cartagena	(Spain) Julián Calero	(Spain) Pedro Alcalá	Macron	Talasur Group
Eibar	(Spain) Joseba Etxeberria	(Spain) Anaitz Arbilla	Hummel	Eibho
Elche	(Argentina) Sebastián Beccacece	(Spain) Pedro Bigas	Nike	VegaFibra
Eldense	(Spain) Fernando Estévez	(Spain) Pedro Capó	Hummel	Finetwork
Espanyol	(Spain) Manolo González	(Uruguay) Leandro Cabrera	Kelme	Riviera Maya
Huesca	(Spain) Antonio Hidalgo	(Spain) Jorge Pulido	Soka	Huesca La Magia
Leganés	(Spain) Borja Jiménez	(Spain) Sergio González	Joma	Africa United
Levante	(Spain) Felipe Miñambres	(Spain) Sergio Postigo	Macron	Marcos Automoción
Mirandés	(Italy) Alessio Lisci	(Spain) Ramón Juan	Adidas	Miranda Empresas
Oviedo	(Spain) Luis Miguel Carrión	(Spain) Borja Bastón	Adidas	Digi
Racing Ferrol	(Spain) Cristóbal Parralo	(Spain) Álex López	Lotto	Estrella Galicia 0,0
Racing Santander	(Spain) José Alberto Lopez	(Spain) Íñigo Sainz-Maza	Austral	Plenitude
Sporting Gijón	(Spain) Miguel Ángel Ramírez	(Argentina) Carlos Izquierdoz	Puma	Jalisco Es México, Integra Energía, Esfer, Nissan
Tenerife	(Spain) Asier Garitano	(Spain) Aitor Sanz	Hummel	Tenerife! Despierta emociones
Valladolid	(Uruguay) Paulo Pezzolano	(Spain) Jordi Masip	Kappa	Estrella Galicia 0,0
Villarreal B	(Spain) Miguel Álvarez	(Spain) Pablo Íñiguez	Joma	Pamesa Cerámica
Zaragoza	(Spain) Víctor Fernández	(Argentina) Cristian Álvarez	Adidas	Caravan Fragancias

=== Managerial changes ===
Team	Outgoing manager	Manner of departure	Date of vacancy	Position in table	Incoming manager	Date of appointment
Tenerife	(Spain) Luis Miguel Ramis	End of contract	30 June 2023	Pre-season	(Spain) Asier Garitano	29 May 2023
Burgos	(Spain) Julián Calero	End of contract	30 June 2023	Pre-season	(Spain) Bolo	31 May 2023
Mirandés	(Spain) Joseba Etxeberria	End of contract	30 June 2023	Pre-season	(Italy) Alessio Lisci	8 June 2023
Cartagena	(Spain) Luis Carrión	End of contract	30 June 2023	Pre-season	(Spain) Víctor Sánchez	6 June 2023
Leganés	(Spain) Carlos Martínez	End of interim spell	30 June 2023	Pre-season	(Spain) Borja Jiménez	6 June 2023
Eibar	(Spain) Gaizka Garitano	Mutual agreement	30 June 2023	Pre-season	(Spain) Joseba Etxeberria	14 June 2023
Oviedo	(Spain) Álvaro Cervera	Sacked	21 September 2023	21st	(Spain) Luis Miguel Carrión	21 September 2023
Cartagena	(Spain) Víctor Sánchez	Sacked	23 September 2023	22nd	(Spain) Julián Calero	25 September 2023
Huesca	(Spain) José Ángel Ziganda	Sacked	7 October 2023	20th	(Spain) Antonio Hidalgo	11 October 2023
Espanyol	(Spain) Luis García	Sacked	5 November 2023	5th	(Spain) Luis Miguel Ramis	6 November 2023
Zaragoza	(Spain) Fran Escribá	Sacked	20 November 2023	12th	(Spain) Julio Velázquez	20 November 2023
Alcorcón	(Spain) Fran Fernández	Sacked	4 December 2023	21st	(Tunisia) Mehdi Nafti	5 December 2023
Amorebieta	(Spain) Haritz Mújika	Sacked	11 December 2023	21st	(Spain) Jandro Castro	13 December 2023
Levante	(Spain) Javi Calleja	Sacked	19 February 2024	10th	(Spain) Felipe Miñambres	19 February 2024
Zaragoza	(Spain) Julio Velázquez	Sacked	11 March 2024	14th	(Spain) Víctor Fernández	11 March 2024
Espanyol	(Spain) Luis Miguel Ramis	Sacked	12 March 2024	3rd	(Spain) Manolo González	12 March 2024
Andorra	(Spain) Eder Sarabia	Sacked	25 March 2024	22nd	(Spain) Toni Astorgano (caretaker)	28 March 2024
Albacete	(Spain) Rubén Albés	Sacked	25 March 2024	19th	(Spain) Alberto González	27 March 2024
Andorra	(Spain) Toni Astorgano	End of caretaker spell	31 March 2024	20th	(Spain) Ferran Costa	31 March 2024

== League table ==
Pos	Team	Pld	W	D	L	GF	GA	GD	Pts	Qualification or relegation
1	Leganés (C, P)	42	20	14	8	56	27	+29	74	Promotion to La Liga
2	Valladolid (P)	42	21	9	12	51	36	+15	72	Promotion to La Liga
3	Eibar	42	21	8	13	72	48	+24	71	Qualification for promotion play-offs
4	Espanyol (O, P)	42	17	18	7	59	40	+19	69	Qualification for promotion play-offs
5	Sporting Gijón	42	18	11	13	51	42	+9	65	Qualification for promotion play-offs
6	Oviedo	42	17	13	12	55	39	+16	64 (Note: Oviedo finished ahead of Racing Santander on overall goal difference)	Qualification for promotion play-offs
7	Racing Santander	42	18	10	14	63	55	+8	64	
8	Levante	42	13	20	9	49	45	+4	59 (Note: Levante finished ahead of Burgos, Racing Ferrol, and Elche on head-to-head points: Levante 12 pts, Burgos 8 pts, Racing Ferrol 8 pts, Elche 4 pts. Burgos finished ahead of Racing Ferrol on head-to-head points: Racing Ferrol 1–1 Burgos, Burgos 2–0 Racing Ferrol)	
9	Burgos	42	16	11	15	52	54	−2	59	
10	Racing Ferrol	42	15	14	13	49	52	−3	59	
11	Elche	42	16	11	15	43	46	−3	59	
12	Tenerife	42	15	11	16	38	41	−3	56	
13	Albacete	42	12	15	15	50	56	−6	51 (Note: Albacete finished ahead of Cartagena and Zaragoza on head-to-head points: Albacete 6 pts, Cartagena 5 pts, Zaragoza 4 pts)	
14	Cartagena	42	14	9	19	37	51	−14	51	
15	Zaragoza	42	12	15	15	42	42	0	51	
16	Eldense	42	12	14	16	46	56	−10	50	
17	Huesca	42	11	16	15	36	33	+3	49 (Note: Huesca finished ahead of Mirandés on head-to-head points: Huesca 1–1 Mirandés, Mirandés 0–3 Huesca)	
18	Mirandés	42	12	13	17	47	55	−8	49	
19	Amorebieta (R)	42	11	12	19	37	53	−16	45	Relegation to Primera Federación
20	Alcorcón (R)	42	10	14	18	32	53	−21	44	Relegation to Primera Federación
21	Andorra (R)	42	11	10	21	33	53	−20	43 (Note: Andorra finished ahead of Villarreal B on overall goal difference)	Relegation to Primera Federación
22	Villarreal B (R)	42	11	10	21	41	62	−21	43	Relegation to Primera Federación

Updated to match(es) played on 2 Jun 2024. Source: LaLiga HyperMotion
Rules for classification: 1) Points; 2) Head-to-head points; 3) Head-to-head goal difference; 4) Goal difference; 5) Goals scored; 6) Fair-play points
(Note: Head-to-head record is used only after all the matches between the teams in question have been played)
(C) Champions; (O) Play-off winners; (P) Promoted; (R) Relegated

== Results ==
Home \ Away	ALB	ALC	AMO	AND	BUR	CAR	EIB	ELC	ELD	ESP	HUE	LEG	LEV	MIR	OVI	RFE	RAC	SPO	TFE	VAL	VIL	ZAR
Albacete	—	0–1	2–2	3–1	2–1	1–1	2–1	1–1	1–1	1–1	1–1	1–0	0–2	2–2	1–2	1–1	2–0	1–3	1–0	2–0	2–0	1–0
Alcorcón	1–2	—	1–1	1–0	1–1	1–1	1–0	0–2	0–0	1–1	0–2	0–2	0–2	0–0	1–0	1–1	3–1	0–0	1–1	1–1	1–0	0–0
Amorebieta	1–1	1–2	—	3–0	0–1	0–0	1–2	1–0	0–2	0–0	0–1	0–1	1–1	2–0	0–0	3–1	0–1	3–1	2–0	0–3	2–0	1–1
Andorra	0–1	2–0	0–1	—	1–0	3–2	0–2	0–1	1–3	1–1	1–0	2–3	2–0	1–0	1–0	1–0	1–1	0–0	0–1	2–1	1–1	0–1
Burgos	2–1	4–2	2–2	0–0	—	3–0	1–0	4–0	1–2	0–0	1–1	1–0	1–1	0–0	1–0	2–0	2–1	1–0	1–1	1–0	3–2	1–1
Cartagena	1–1	1–0	1–0	1–0	0–3	—	1–2	0–1	0–1	0–2	0–2	0–3	0–1	1–0	2–0	2–1	2–3	1–0	2–0	0–2	4–1	1–3
Eibar	1–1	2–0	5–0	2–2	0–1	1–0	—	2–1	5–1	2–3	1–1	0–1	3–1	1–0	4–3	2–0	2–0	1–1	3–0	5–1	2–0	1–0
Elche	3–2	3–0	2–0	2–1	2–0	1–2	0–0	—	1–2	2–2	0–3	1–0	0–0	0–0	0–2	0–1	1–1	2–1	2–1	0–0	1–0	2–0
Eldense	0–1	2–2	2–0	0–2	2–0	0–0	2–1	1–1	—	3–2	0–0	1–2	0–0	2–2	1–3	2–0	3–3	0–1	0–3	0–1	2–0	1–1
Espanyol	2–1	2–0	3–2	1–1	3–3	3–0	2–2	2–0	3–3	—	0–0	0–1	2–1	3–0	2–1	3–0	2–0	0–0	1–1	2–0	2–1	1–1
Huesca	0–0	1–0	0–0	2–0	3–0	3–0	2–3	0–1	0–1	1–1	—	0–0	0–0	1–1	0–2	1–0	0–3	0–1	0–2	0–1	2–2	1–2
Leganés	2–0	3–0	6–0	0–1	2–0	0–0	0–2	2–0	1–1	0–0	2–0	—	2–1	4–0	0–0	2–2	2–1	2–1	1–1	0–0	1–0	1–1
Levante	3–2	2–2	1–2	0–0	3–2	0–1	2–2	3–2	2–0	1–4	2–1	0–0	—	2–2	1–1	1–0	2–4	1–0	0–0	2–1	1–1	2–1
Mirandés	2–0	4–0	1–0	4–3	2–1	2–1	1–3	1–1	3–1	0–1	0–3	1–3	1–1	—	2–1	1–2	0–0	1–3	1–1	0–1	3–0	0–0
Oviedo	3–0	2–0	1–1	3–0	5–0	1–1	2–1	3–2	1–1	2–0	1–0	1–0	3–2	1–1	—	1–1	1–1	0–0	0–1	0–1	2–1	1–0
Racing Ferrol	5–4	2–1	1–0	1–0	1–1	1–1	1–1	1–0	1–1	0–0	2–1	2–2	0–0	0–2	1–3	—	2–2	2–0	3–1	2–0	2–2	1–0
Racing Santander	2–1	0–1	1–0	2–0	3–0	0–2	4–0	3–1	2–1	2–0	0–0	2–1	0–0	1–0	2–2	1–3	—	3–2	4–2	2–3	2–0	0–2
Sporting Gijón	2–1	1–0	1–1	5–2	2–1	1–0	1–0	2–0	2–0	2–0	0–0	1–1	0–0	3–0	1–0	1–2	2–3	—	2–1	1–1	0–3	2–2
Tenerife	2–0	1–0	0–1	0–0	2–1	1–1	2–1	0–1	1–0	1–0	0–0	0–0	0–0	2–1	1–0	2–0	2–0	1–2	—	2–1	0–1	0–1
Valladolid	0–0	0–2	2–1	2–0	3–0	1–0	3–1	1–1	1–0	0–0	1–0	1–1	0–0	3–2	3–0	0–1	3–1	2–0	2–0	—	3–2	2–0
Villarreal B	2–2	2–2	3–1	0–0	2–1	1–2	1–0	0–1	3–1	3–1	1–1	1–2	0–3	0–3	1–1	1–0	1–0	0–3	1–0	1–0	—	0–0
Zaragoza	1–1	0–2	0–1	2–0	1–3	1–2	2–3	1–1	2–0	0–1	0–2	1–0	2–2	0–1	0–0	2–2	1–1	3–0	3–1	1–0	2–0	—

Updated to match(es) played on 2 Jun 2024. Source: LaLiga
Legend: Blue = home team win; Yellow = draw; Red = away team win.

=== Positions by round ===
The table lists the positions of teams after each week of matches. In order to preserve chronological evolvements, any postponed matches are not included to the round at which they were originally scheduled, but added to the full round they were played immediately afterwards.

Team ╲ Round	1	2	3	4	5	6	7	8	9	10	11	12	13	14	15	16	17	18	19	20	21	22	23	24	25	26	27	28	29	30	31	32	33	34	35	36	37	38	39	40	41	42
Leganés	17	10	5	3	3	3	2	1	3	3	2	1	1	1	1	1	1	1	1	1	1	1	1	1	1	1	1	1	1	1	1	1	1	1	1	1	1	1	2	1	2	1
Valladolid	3	11	16	20	18	16	10	7	7	6	7	6	7	4	3	3	3	3	2	2	4	7	7	5	5	6	6	4	6	5	7	5	6	4	4	3	2	2	1	2	1	2
Eibar	22	14	17	21	22	17	12	9	8	7	6	5	2	3	4	5	5	6	5	6	7	5	4	2	2	2	2	3	2	4	4	4	2	3	2	2	3	3	3	3	3	3
Espanyol	12	4	2	2	2	2	4	2	1	2	1	2	4	5	6	4	4	4	4	5	5	4	3	6	4	5	3	2	3	3	3	2	3	2	3	4	4	4	4	4	4	4
Sporting	19	9	13	7	10	6	8	6	5	8	9	8	3	2	2	2	2	2	3	3	3	3	2	4	7	4	5	7	5	8	5	7	10	8	5	6	7	9	7	7	7	5
Oviedo	18	18	21	22	19	21	21	20	17	16	13	13	12	13	14	12	12	11	11	10	10	11	8	7	8	10	7	10	8	7	8	9	7	5	6	7	8	5	5	6	5	6
Racing S.	2	7	10	11	6	7	6	8	12	10	8	7	8	10	12	7	7	8	8	8	6	8	10	12	11	8	9	8	10	9	10	6	4	6	9	9	6	6	6	5	6	7
Levante	14	5	4	6	7	5	5	4	6	4	3	3	5	6	7	8	9	10	10	7	8	6	6	8	9	11	10	11	13	11	11	11	11	9	11	11	11	10	11	10	10	8
Burgos	11	17	11	14	9	15	9	12	11	13	10	11	14	15	13	14	15	13	13	11	11	9	11	10	12	9	11	9	7	6	6	8	9	11	10	10	9	8	9	11	11	9
Racing F.	7	6	3	5	5	8	7	10	9	9	11	10	10	7	5	6	6	5	6	4	2	2	5	3	3	3	4	6	9	10	9	10	8	10	7	8	10	11	10	9	8	10
Elche	16	21	15	15	14	11	17	17	18	14	16	12	11	11	9	11	8	7	9	12	12	10	9	9	6	7	8	5	4	2	2	3	5	7	8	5	5	7	8	8	9	11
Tenerife	8	1	6	4	4	4	3	5	4	1	4	4	6	8	8	10	10	9	7	9	9	12	13	14	15	15	13	14	12	13	13	12	12	12	12	12	12	12	12	12	12	12
Albacete	9	15	19	12	15	12	15	11	10	11	12	15	17	17	16	16	16	16	15	16	16	16	16	16	17	20	17	17	17	18	18	19	19	21	20	19	18	15	14	14	15	13
Cartagena	15	20	22	17	20	22	22	22	22	22	22	22	22	22	22	22	22	22	20	22	22	21	21	20	18	17	16	18	18	17	17	16	16	16	17	16	14	13	13	13	13	14
Zaragoza	4	2	1	1	1	1	1	3	2	5	5	9	9	9	10	13	14	12	12	14	14	14	12	11	10	12	12	13	14	14	15	15	15	15	14	13	13	14	15	15	14	15
Eldense	6	13	7	9	11	13	16	18	19	15	17	17	15	12	11	9	11	15	16	15	15	15	15	13	13	13	14	12	11	12	12	13	13	13	15	15	16	17	16	16	16	16
Huesca	13	19	20	19	21	20	18	19	20	21	21	21	21	20	19	19	19	19	19	19	19	18	19	19	16	16	18	16	15	15	14	14	14	14	13	14	17	18	17	17	17	17
Mirandés	1	8	12	13	8	14	19	13	14	17	18	14	13	14	15	15	13	14	14	13	13	13	14	15	14	14	15	15	16	16	16	17	17	17	18	17	15	16	18	18	18	18
Amorebieta	10	16	9	10	13	10	13	15	16	19	19	19	19	21	21	20	20	20	21	21	21	22	22	22	22	22	22	22	22	22	22	20	21	20	19	20	21	21	20	19	19	19
Alcorcón	21	22	18	16	16	19	20	21	21	20	20	20	20	19	20	21	21	21	22	20	20	20	18	18	20	19	20	20	20	20	20	18	18	18	16	18	19	19	19	20	20	20
Andorra	5	3	8	8	12	9	11	14	15	18	15	18	16	16	18	18	17	17	17	17	18	19	20	21	21	21	21	21	21	21	21	22	20	19	21	21	22	22	22	21	21	21
Villarreal B	20	12	14	18	17	18	14	16	13	12	14	16	18	18	17	17	18	18	18	18	17	17	17	17	19	18	19	19	19	19	19	21	22	22	22	22	20	20	21	22	22	22

Promotion to La Liga
Qualification to promotion play-offs
Relegation to Primera Federación

Source: BDFútbol

== Promotion play-offs ==
Semi-finals
3	Eibar	0	0	0
6	Oviedo	0	2	2
4	Espanyol	1	0	1
5	Sporting Gijón	0	0	0

Final
6	Oviedo	1	0	1
4	Espanyol	0	2	2

=== Semi-finals ===
First leg

8 June 2024	Oviedo	0–0	Eibar	Oviedo
18:30 UTC+2		Report		Stadium: Carlos Tartiere; Attendance: 28,100; Referee: Alejandro Quintero González

9 June 2024	Sporting Gijón	0–1	Espanyol	Gijón
21:00 UTC+2		Report	Puado 88'; Gómez (red card) 90'	Stadium: El Molinón; Attendance: 25,075; Referee: Jon Ander González Esteban

Second leg

12 June 2024	Eibar	0–2 (0–2 agg.)	Oviedo	Eibar
21:00 UTC+2		Report	Alemão 59'; Moyano 79'	Stadium: Ipurúa; Attendance: 7,732; Referee: Iosu Galech Apezteguía

13 June 2024	Espanyol	0–0 (1–0 agg.)	Sporting Gijón	Cornellà–El Prat
21:00 UTC+2	El Hilali (red card) 90+1'	Report		Stadium: Stage Front; Attendance: 30,605; Referee: Álvaro Moreno Aragón

=== Finals ===
First leg

16 June 2024	Oviedo	1–0	Espanyol	Oviedo
18:30 UTC+2	Alemão 72'	Report		Stadium: Carlos Tartiere; Attendance: 29,297; Referee: Dámaso Arcediano Monescillo

Second leg

23 June 2024	Espanyol	2–0 (2–1 agg.)	Oviedo	Cornellà–El Prat
18:30 UTC+2	Puado 44', 45+2'	Report		Stadium: Stage Front; Attendance: 33,107; Referee: Adrián Cordero Vega

== Season statistics ==
=== Scoring ===
- First goal of the season:
  (Morocco) Mohamed Bouldini for Levante against Amorebieta (11 August 2023)
- Final goal of the season:
  (Spain) Alejandro Francés (own goal), Zaragoza against Albacete (2 June 2024)

=== Top goalscorers ===
Rank	Player	Club	Goals
1	(Denmark) Martin Braithwaite	Espanyol	22
2	(Spain) Peque Fernández	Racing Santander	18
3	(Spain) Jon Bautista	Eibar	17
4	(Spain) Álex Forés	Villarreal B	16
5	(Spain) Carlos Martín	Mirandés	15
5	(Spain) Curro Sánchez	Burgos	15
7	(Spain) Juan Carlos Arana	Racing Santander	13
7	(Spain) Miguel de la Fuente	Leganés	13
7	(Spain) Javi Puado	Espanyol	13
10	(Spain) Diego García	Leganés	12
10	(Spain) Stoichkov	Eibar	12

=== Top assists ===
Rank	Player	Club	Assists
1	(Spain) Iñigo Vicente	Racing Santander	12
2	(Spain) Manu Fuster	Albacete	11
3	(Argentina) Santiago Colombatto	Oviedo	9
4	(Spain) Sergio Lozano	Levante	8
4	(Spain) Héber Pena	Racing Ferrol	8
6	(Spain) Cote	Sporting Gijón	7
6	(Spain) Iker Losada	Racing Ferrol	7
6	(Spain) Marc Mateu	Eldense	7
6	(Brazil) Matheus	Eibar	7
6	(Spain) Francisco Portillo	Leganés	7
6	(Spain) Dani Raba	Leganés	7
6	(Spain) Stoichkov	Eibar	7
6	(Spain) Álvaro Tejero	Eibar	7

=== Hat-tricks ===
Player	For	Against	Result	Date	Round	Ref.
(Spain) Manu Nieto	Andorra	Cartagena	3–2 (H)	18 August 2023	2	
(Spain) Miguel de la Fuente	Leganés	Amorebieta	6–0 (H)	15 October 2023	11	
(Spain) Sabin Merino	Racing Ferrol	Albacete	5–4 (H)	3 December 2023	18	
(Spain) Sebas Moyano	Oviedo	Burgos	5–0 (H)	17 February 2024	27	

Note

(H) – Home; (A) – Away

=== Zamora Trophy ===
The Zamora Trophy is awarded by newspaper Marca to the goalkeeper with the lowest goals-to-games ratio. A goalkeeper has to have played at least 28 games of 60 or more minutes to be eligible for the trophy.

Rank	Player	Club	Goals against	Matches	Average
1	(Spain) Diego Conde	Leganés	26	39	0.67
2	(Spain) Jordi Masip	Valladolid	22	31	0.71
3	(Spain) Álvaro Fernández	Huesca	33	41	0.80
4	(Spain) Andrés Fernández	Levante	29	33	0.88
5	(Spain) Leo Román	Oviedo	39	42	0.93

== Awards ==
=== Monthly ===
Month	Player of the Month		Reference
Month	Player	Club	Reference
August	(Argentina) Cristian Álvarez	Zaragoza	
September	(Spain) Javi Puado	Espanyol	
October	(Spain) Jon Bautista	Eibar	
November	(Spain) Miguel de la Fuente	Leganés	
December	(Spain) Iker Losada	Racing Ferrol	
January	(Spain) Sebas Moyano	Oviedo	
February	(Denmark) Martin Braithwaite	Espanyol	
March	(Argentina) Nico Fernández	Elche	
April	(Spain) Monchu	Valladolid	

== Attendances ==
Real Zaragoza drew the highest average home attendance in the 2023-24 edition of the Segunda División.

#	Football club	Home games	Average attendance
1	Real Zaragoza	21	22,535
2	Sporting de Gijón	21	19,508
3	RCD Espanyol	21	19,147
4	Real Oviedo	21	17,983
5	Real Valladolid	21	17,515
6	Racing de Santander	21	15,804
7	Elche CF	21	15,695
8	CD Tenerife	21	15,242
9	Levante UD	21	14,226
10	Albacete Balompié	21	10,601
11	Burgos CF	21	9,463
12	CD Leganés	21	8,516
13	FC Cartagena	21	8,393
14	Racing de Ferrol	21	6,733
15	SD Huesca	21	5,635
16	SD Eibar	21	5,422
17	CD Eldense	21	4,594
18	AD Alcorcón	21	3,410
19	CD Mirandés	21	3,345
20	Villarreal CF B	21	2,999
21	FC Andorra	21	2,057
22	SD Amorebieta	21	1,373

== See also ==
- 2023–24 La Liga
- 2023–24 Primera Federación
- 2023–24 Segunda Federación
- 2023–24 Tercera Federación
