= 2025–26 FC Andorra season =

FC Andorra
2025–26 season
- President: Ferran Vilaseca
- Manager: Ibai Gómez (until 20 November 2025); Carles Manso (interim, from 20 November to 21 December 2025); Carles Manso (from 21 December 2025)
- Stadium: Estadi de la FAF, Encamp
- Segunda División: 13th
- Copa del Rey: Second round
- Top goalscorer: League: Josep Cerdà (10); All: Josep Cerdà (11)
Home colours	Away colours	Third colours

The 2025–26 season is the 83rd in the history of FC Andorra. The club will compete in the Spanish Segunda División, following its promotion from the Primera Federación, and will also participate in the Copa del Rey.

On 25 June 2025, Ibai Gómez took over as head coach under a two-season contract.

On 26 July 2025, Andorra agreed terms with the Andorran Football Federation for using the Estadi de la FAF, in Encamp, until May 2026.

On 17 August 2025, Nico Ratti, Sergio Molina, Martí Vilà, and Diego Alende will be the captains of FC Andorra's first team for the new 2025–26 season. All four are continuing from last year, solidifying their roles as the leaders of the tricolor locker room.

On 25 November 2025, Carles Manso became the caretaker manager of Andorra, after Ibai was sacked.

On 21 December 2025, after leading the club out of the relegation zone, Manso was confirmed as manager of Andorra.

== Players ==
=== Current squad ===
As of 30 June 2026

Note: Flags indicate national team as defined under FIFA eligibility rules; some limited exceptions apply. Players may hold more than one non-FIFA nationality.

No.	Pos.	Nation	Player
1	GK	ARG	Nico Ratti (captain)
2	DF	ESP	Álex Petxarroman (on loan from Deportivo La Coruña)
3	FW	ESP	Yeray Cabanzón (on loan from Racing Santander)
4	DF	ESP	Gael Alonso
5	DF	ESP	Marc Bombardó
6	MF	ESP	Dani Villahermosa
7	FW	ESP	Álex Calvo
8	MF	TUR	Efe Akman
9	FW	ESP	Manu Nieto
10	MF	ESP	Álvaro Martín
11	FW	URU	Lautaro de León
12	DF	ESP	Edgar González (on loan from Almería)
13	GK	GEQ	Jesús Owono (on loan from Alavés)

No.	Pos.	Nation	Player
14	MF	ESP	Sergio Molina (vice-captain)
15	FW	ESP	Aingeru Olabarrieta (on loan from Athletic Bilbao)
16	FW	POR	Jastin García (on loan from Girona)
17	DF	FRA	Thomas Carrique
18	MF	ESP	Marc Domènech
19	DF	ESP	Imanol García de Albéniz (on loan from Sparta Prague)
20	DF	ESP	Martí Vilà (3rd captain)
21	FW	ESP	Josep Cerdà
22	FW	ESP	Marc Cardona
23	DF	ESP	Diego Alende (4th captain)
24	MF	FRA	Théo Le Normand
25	GK	HUN	Áron Yaakobishvili (on loan from Barcelona B)
29	FW	KOR	Kim Min-su (on loan from Girona)

=== Youth players ===
Note: Flags indicate national team as defined under FIFA eligibility rules; some limited exceptions apply. Players may hold more than one non-FIFA nationality.

No.	Pos.	Nation	Player
30	MF	ESP	Victor Chumachenko
31	GK	ESP	Jan Lagunas

=== Out on loan ===
Note: Flags indicate national team as defined under FIFA eligibility rules; some limited exceptions apply. Players may hold more than one non-FIFA nationality.

No.	Pos.	Nation	Player
—	DF	AND	Iván Rodríguez (at Villarreal B until 30 June 2026)
—	DF	ESP	Jan Encuentra (at Unionistas until 30 June 2026)
—	DF	ESP	Javier Vicario (at Barakaldo until 30 June 2026)
—	MF	ESP	Alberto Solís (at Arenteiro until 30 June 2026)
—	MF	ESP	Luismi Redondo (at Cartagena until 30 June 2026)

No.	Pos.	Nation	Player
—	FW	ESP	Aitor Uzkudun (at Real Avilés until 30 June 2026)
—	FW	AND	Berto Rosas (at Logroñés until 30 June 2026)
—	FW	ESP	Bilal Achhiba (at Atlètic Lleida until 30 June 2026)
—	FW	GRE	Christos Almpanis (at Gimnàstic until 30 June 2026)
—	FW	COL	Juanda Fuentes (at Gimnàstic until 30 June 2026)

== Transfers ==
=== Transfers In ===
Pos.	Player	Transferred from	Fee	Date	Source
MF	(France) Théo Le Normand	Teruel	Loan return	30 June 2025	
FW	(Spain) Álex Calvo	Mirandés	Loan return	30 June 2025	
FW	(Andorra) Berto Rosas	Atlético Baleares	Loan return	30 June 2025	
MF	(Spain) Marc Domènech	Ibiza	Free	1 July 2025	
DF	(France) Thomas Carrique	Ponferradina	Free	1 July 2025	
FW	(Spain) Bilal Achhiba	Gimnàstic Manresa	Youth system	1 July 2025	
DF	(Spain) Gael Alonso	Celta Fortuna	Free	10 July 2025	
DF	(Spain) Jan Encuentra	Betis U19	Free	12 July 2025	
GK	(Equatorial Guinea) Jesús Owono	Deportivo Alavés	Loan	13 July 2025	
DF	(Spain) Alejandro Ibarrondo	Arenas	Free	13 July 2025	
FW	(Spain) Aitor Uzkudun	Arenas	Free	13 July 2025	
FW	(South Korea) Kim Min-su	Girona	Loan	15 July 2025	
GK	(Hungary) Áron Yaakobishvili	Barcelona Atlètic	Loan	15 July 2025	
DF	(Spain) Javier Vicario	Arenas	Free	17 July 2025	
DF	(Spain) Imanol García de Albéniz	Sparta Prague	Loan	19 July 2025	
FW	(Portugal) Jastin García	Girona	Loan	8 August 2025	
FW	(Spain) Aingeru Olabarrieta	Athletic Bilbao	Loan	9 August 2025	
DF	(Spain) Álex Petxarroman	Deportivo A Coruña	Loan	14 August 2025	
DF	(Spain) Antal Yaakobishvili	Girona	Loan	15 August 2025	
MF	(Turkey) Efe Akman	Galatasaray	Undisclosed	1 September 2025	
FW	(Spain) Martín Merquelanz	Free agent	Free	3 October 2025	
FW	(Spain) Yeray Cabanzón	Racing Santander	Loan	9 January 2026	
DF	(Spain) Edgar González	Almería	Loan	12 January 2026	
FW	(Spain) Marc Cardona	Las Palmas	Free	21 January 2026	

=== Transfers Out ===
Pos.	Player	Transferred to	Fee	Date	Source
GK	(Spain) Oier Olazábal	Retired	End of contract	30 June 2025	
DF	(Spain) Pau Casadesús	Granada	End of contract	30 June 2025	
DF	(Spain) Manel Royo	Teruel	End of contract	30 June 2025	
DF	(Spain) Jesús Clemente	Eldense	Released	30 June 2025	
DF	(Spain) César Morgado	Gimnàstic	Released	30 June 2025	
DF	(Spain) Pablo Trigueros	Lugo	Released	30 June 2025	
MF	(Spain) Oriol Busquets	Eupen	End of contract	30 June 2025	
FW	(Spain) Bilal Achhiba	Atlètic Lleida	Loan	13 July 2025	
DF	(Spain) Javier Vicario	Barakaldo	Loan	18 July 2025	
MF	(Spain) Luismi Redondo	Cartagena	Loan	22 July 2025	
MF	(Spain) Álvaro Peña	Racing Ferrol	Contract terminated	24 July 2025	
FW	(Colombia) Juanda Fuentes	Gimnàstic	Loan	24 July 2025	
DF	(Spain) Jan Encuentra	Unionistas	Loan	1 August 2025	
DF	(Andorra) Iván Rodríguez	Villarreal B	Loan	6 August 2025	
FW	(Andorra) Berto Rosas	Logroñés	Loan	11 August 2025	
DF	(Spain) Alejandro Ibarrondo	Eldense	Undisclosed	13 August 2025	
MF	(Spain) Alberto Solís	Arenteiro	Loan	19 August 2025	
FW	(Greece) Christos Almpanis	Gimnàstic	Loan	22 August 2025	
MF	(Spain) Erik Morán	Ponferradina	Contract terminated	1 September 2025	
FW	(Spain) Martín Merquelanz	Kitchee	Contract terminated	12 January 2026	
DF	(Hungary) Antal Yaakobishvili	Girona	End of loan	22 January 2026	
FW	(Spain) Aitor Uzkudun	Real Avilés	Loan	27 January 2026	

== Friendlies ==
On 16 July 2025, the team announced its preseason schedule and departed the same day for a training camp in San Pedro del Pinatar, set to last eleven days.

23 July 2025	Albacete (Spain)	2–0	Andorra	San Pedro del Pinatar, Spain
19:00	Valverde 57'; García 69'			Stadium: Pinatar Arena

26 July 2025	Al-Rayyan (Qatar)	0–1	Andorra	Algorfa, Spain
10:30			Le Normand 90'	Stadium: La Finca Resort

1 August 2025	Gimnàstic (Spain)	0–2	Andorra	Tarragona, Spain
20:00			Nil 39' org.; Villahermosa 88'	Stadium: Nou Estadi Costa Daurada

2 August 2025	Andorra	3–1	(Spain) Europa	Lleida, Spain
18:30	Nieto 45+2'; Imanol 67' p.; Lautaro 88'		Cano 28'	Stadium: Camp d'Esports

6 August 2025	Andorra	1–0	(Spain) Zamora	San Sebastián de los Reyes, Spain
19:30	Merquelanz 32'			Stadium: Estadio Matapiñonera

6 August 2025	Andorra	0–0	(Spain) Sanse	San Sebastián de los Reyes, Spain
19:30				Stadium: Estadio Matapiñonera

8 August 2025	Real Madrid Castilla (Spain)	1–3	Andorra	Madrid, Spain
10:15	Rachad 70'		de León 22'; Domènech 87'; Alonso 89'	Stadium: Valdebebas

== Competitions ==
=== Overall record ===
Competition	First match	Last match	Starting round	Record							
Competition	First match	Last match	Starting round	Pld	W	D	L	GF	GA	GD	Win %
Segunda División	17 August 2025	31 May 2025	Matchday 3	3	2	1	0	6	3	+3	66.67
Copa del Rey				0	0	0	0	0	0	+0	—
Total				3	2	1	0	6	3	+3	66.67

Source: Competitions

=== Segunda División ===
==== League table ====
Pos	Team	Pld	W	D	L	GF	GA	GD	Pts
11	Ceuta	42	17	10	15	51	63	−12	61 (Note: Tied on head-to-head points. Head-to-head goal difference: Córdoba +1, Sporting Gijón 0, Ceuta –1.)
12	Albacete	42	16	11	15	56	55	+1	59
13	Andorra	42	16	10	16	62	54	+8	58
14	Granada	42	12	12	18	50	56	−6	48
15	Real Sociedad B	42	12	11	19	52	61	−9	47

Source: LaLiga Hypermotion
Rules for classification: 1) Points; 2) Head-to-head points; 3) Head-to-head goal difference; 4) Goal difference; 5) Goals scored; 6) Fair-play points
(Note: Head-to-head record is used only after all the matches between the teams in question have been played)

==== Results by round ====
Round	1	2	3	4	5	6	7	8	9	10	11	12	13	14	15	16	17	18	19	20	21	22	23	24	25	26	27	28	29	30	31	32	33	34	35	36	37	38	39	40	41	42
Ground																																										
Result																																										
Position																																										

Updated to match(es) played on 4 January 2026. Source:
A = Away; H = Home; W = Win; D = Draw; L = Loss

==== Matches ====
17 August 2025 1	Las Palmas	1–1	Andorra	Las Palmas
21:30	A. García 8'; Pezzolesi (yellow card) 76' (red card) 90+1'		Carrique (yellow card) 32'; Molina (yellow card) 45+1'; Le Normand (yellow card) 59'; Barcia 77' (o.g.)	Stadium: Gran Canaria Stadium; Attendance: 19,664; Referee: Luis Bestard Servera

23 August 2025 2	Zaragoza	1–3	Andorra	Zaragoza
21:30	Radovanović (yellow card) 26'; Pomares (red card) 61'; Baždar 78'		de León 9'; de Albéniz (yellow card) 27'; Kim Min-su (yellow card) 27'; Villahermosa 68'; Alonso 73'	Stadium: Ibercaja Stadium; Attendance: 13,126; Referee: Manuel Ángel Pérez Hernández

31 August 2025 3	Andorra	2–1	Burgos	Encamp
17:00	Kim Min-su 41'; Domènech 55'; Alonso (yellow card) 85'		Atienza (yellow card) 15'; Niño 59'; Chapela (yellow card) 75'	Stadium: Estadi de la FAF; Attendance: 2,031; Referee: Álvaro Moreno Aragón

8 September 2025 4	Eibar	2–0	Andorra	Eibar
20:30	Garrido (yellow card) 17'; Corpas (yellow card) 17', (penalty missed) 28'; Cubero 53'; Martínez 79'; Buta (yellow card) 90+3'		Alonso (yellow card) 10'; de León (yellow card) 24'; Yaakobishvili (yellow card) 26'; Martín (yellow card) 90'	Stadium: Ipurua Municipal Stadium; Attendance: 4,693; Referee: Manuel Jesús Orellana Cid

14 September 2025 5	Andorra	3–1	Córdoba	Encamp
14:00	Olabarrieta 20'; Kim Min-su 35'; Petxarroman (yellow card) 37'; Yaakobishvili (yellow card) 79'; Villahermosa 83'		Petxarroman 2' (o.g.); Muñoz (yellow card) 44'; Fomeyem (yellow card) 45+1'; Dali (yellow card) 79'; Ortiz (yellow card) 83'	Stadium: Estadi de la FAF; Attendance: 3,731; Referee: Alejandro Morilla Turrión

20 September 2025 6	Andorra	1–1	Mirandés	Encamp
18:30	Kim Min-su (yellow card) 8'; Villahermosa 21'; Vilà (yellow card) 85'		Medrano (yellow card) 16'; Fernández 26' (pen.); Pascual (yellow card) 32'; Córdoba (yellow card) 35'; Bauzà (yellow card) 82'; Nikić (yellow card) 85'	Stadium: Estadi de la FAF; Attendance: 3,931; Referee: Alonso De Ena Wolf

27 September 2025 7	Racing Santander	1–2	Andorra	Santander
18:30	Sangalli (yellow card) 51', (goal) 72'; Martín (yellow card) 52'; Vicente (yellow card) 55'		de León 53' (pen.); Kim Min-su (yellow card) 56'; Molina (yellow card) 63'; Calvo 75'; Petxarroman (yellow card) 86'	Stadium: Campos de Sport de El Sardinero; Attendance: 19,896; Referee: Eder Mallo Fernández

4 October 2025 8	Andorra	1–2	Leganés	Encamp
18:30	Alonso 86'; Petxarroman (yellow card) 90+5' (red card) 90+7'		Duk 48'; García 51'; Marvel (yellow card) 78'; Figueredo (yellow card) 80'; Melero (yellow card) 90'	Stadium: Estadi de la FAF; Attendance: 3,520; Referee: Saúl Ais Reig

11 October 2025 9	Real Sociedad B	3–0	Andorra	San Sebastián
18:30	Carrera 3', 49', (yellow card) 31'; Rodríguez (yellow card) 23'; Gorosabel (yellow card) 36'; Astiazaran 69'; Balda (yellow card) 81'		García (yellow card) 30'; Le Normand (yellow card) 44'; Alonso (red card) 58'	Stadium: Anoeta Stadium; Attendance: 2,766; Referee: Andrés Fuentes Molina

17 October 2025 10	Andorra	0–0	Granada	Encamp
20:30	Olabarrieta (yellow card) 13'; Bombardó (yellow card) 78'; García (yellow card) 79'; Molina (yellow card) 90+3'		Alcaraz (yellow card) 68'; Faye (yellow card) 78'	Stadium: Estadi de la FAF; Attendance: 3,620; Referee: Marta Huerta De Aza

26 October 2025 11	Málaga	4–1	Andorra	Málaga
15:00	Larrubia 20'; Brašanac (red card) 49'; Juanpe (yellow card) 55'; Lobete 58'; Chupete (yellow card) 81'; Jauregi 86', 90+4'		Kim Min-su (yellow card) 26'; Villahermosa (yellow card) 53'; Uzkudun (yellow card) 90'; Nieto 90'	Stadium: Estadio La Rosaleda; Attendance: 22,106; Referee: Alejandro Morilla Turrión

2 November 2025 12	Andorra	0–0	Cádiz	Encamp
14:00	Carrique (yellow card) 63'; de Albéniz (yellow card) 90+1'; Alonso (yellow card) 90+3'		Climent (yellow card) 45+1'; Aghama (yellow card) 81'	Stadium: Estadi de la FAF; Attendance: 3,320; Referee: Miguel González Díaz

8 November 2025 13	Huesca	2–2	Andorra	Huesca
16:15	Pulido 77'; Sielva 89' (pen.); Rico (yellow card) 90+5'		Alonso (yellow card) 16'; Kim Min-su 29'; Villahermosa 35'; Merquelanz (yellow card) 54'; Olabarrieta (yellow card) 64'; Domènech (yellow card) 71'; Nieto (yellow card) 90+3'	Stadium: Estadio El Alcoraz; Attendance: 5,938; Referee: Daniel Palencia Caballero

15 November 2025 14	Albacete	1–0	Andorra	Albacete
16:00	Lazo 55'; Capi (yellow card) 90+3'		Bombardó (yellow card) 4'	Stadium: Estadio Carlos Belmonte; Attendance: 8,705; Referee: Sergiu Claudiu Muresan

22 November 2025 15	Andorra	1–3	Castellón	Encamp
16:15	Carrique (yellow card) 37'; Nieto (yellow card) 66'; Kim Min-su 89'		Santiago (yellow card) 4', (goal) 13'; Alberto 54'; Jakobsen 56'; Gerenabarrena (yellow card) 65'	Stadium: Estadi de la FAF; Attendance: 2,300; Referee: Germán Cid Camacho

28 November 2025 16	Sporting Gijón	1–1	Andorra	Gijón
20:30	Smith (yellow card) 72'; Sánchez (yellow card) 82'; Corredera (yellow card) 90'; Gelabert 90+11' (pen.)		Vilà (yellow card) 52'; Domènech (yellow card) 76'; de León 80'; Nieto (yellow card) 87'	Stadium: El Molinón; Attendance: 18,574; Referee: Alejandro Ojaos Valera

6 December 2025 17	Andorra	1–2	Almeria	Encamp
14:00	García (yellow card) 86'; Nieto 90+4'		Monte (yellow card) 15'; Arribas 69', 77'; Luna (yellow card) 90+2'	Stadium: Estadi de la FAF; Attendance: 2,510; Referee: Rafael Sánchez López

13 December 2025 18	Valladolid	0–1	Andorra	Valladolid
16:15	Ponceau (yellow card) 4'; Bueno (yellow card) 35'; Alejo (yellow card) 78'		Molina (yellow card) 15'; Olabarrieta (yellow card) 71'; Kim Min-su 90+2'	Stadium: Estadio José Zorrilla; Attendance: 14,897; Referee: Marta Huerta De Aza

20 December 2025 19	Andorra	1–0	Deportivo La Coruña	Encamp
14:00	Uzkudun (yellow card) 32'; Akman (yellow card) 60'; de León 77'; Alonso (yellow card) 80'		Ángel (yellow card) 34'; Gragera (yellow card) 65'; Stoichkov (yellow card) 90+1'; Soriano (yellow card) 90+4'	Stadium: Estadi de la FAF; Attendance: 2,620; Referee: Eder Mallo Fernández

4 January 2026 20	Ceuta	2–1	Andorra	Ceuta
16:15	Lachhab 27'; Obeng (yellow card) 44'; Kone (yellow card) 45'; Hernández 47'		Carrique (yellow card) 55'; Nieto 80' (pen.); Villahermosa (yellow card) 88'	Stadium: Estadio Alfonso Murube; Attendance: 3,413; Referee: Álvaro Moreno Aragón

10 January 2026 21	Andorra	1–1	Cultural Leonesa	Encamp
16:30	Calvo (yellow card) 51'; Cerdà 58'		Chacón 14'; Barzic (yellow card) 45+2'; Larios (yellow card) 67'; García (yellow card) 72'; Yayo (yellow card) 81'	Stadium: Estadi de la FAF; Attendance: 1,121; Referee: Saúl Ais Reig

18 January 2026 22	Mirandés	1–2	Andorra	Miranda de Ebro
14:00	Marí (yellow card) 6'; Hernández 75'; Bauzà (yellow card) 90'		Villahermosa 10', (yellow card) 43'; Akman (yellow card) 20'; Molina 48', (yellow card) 49'; Le Normand (yellow card) 64'	Stadium: Estadio Municipal de Anduva; Attendance: 3,048; Referee: Alejandro Ojaos Valera

25 January 2026 23	Andorra	1–1	Huesca	Encamp
14:00	Cabanzón 23', (yellow card) 31'; de Albéniz (yellow card) 68'		Abad (yellow card) 3'; Kortajarena 36'; Martín (yellow card) 66'; Álvarez (yellow card) 74'; Enrich (yellow card) 84'	Stadium: Estadi de la FAF; Attendance: 1,531; Referee: Andrés Fuentes Molina

1 February 2026 24	Castellón	2–0	Andorra	Castellón de la Plana
18:30	Brignani (yellow card) 22'; Gerenabarrena 28'; Alcázar 40'; Alberto (yellow card) 63'; Mellot (yellow card) 76'		González (yellow card) 59'; Villahermosa (yellow card) 61'; García (yellow card) 76'; Olabarrieta (yellow card) 83'	Stadium: Nou Estadi Castàlia; Attendance: 12,054; Referee: Jon Ander González Esteban

7 February 2026 25	Andorra	1–2	Real Sociedad B	Encamp
14:00	García 16'; Cabanzón (yellow card) 49'; Martín (yellow card) 52'; Akman (yellow card) 74'; Vilà (yellow card) 86'		Beitia (yellow card) 2'; Gorosabel 10'; Dadie (yellow card) 44'; Aguirre (yellow card) 48'; Carrera 76'; Balda (yellow card) 85'; Carbonell (yellow card) 90'	Stadium: Estadi de la FAF; Attendance: 1,542; Referee: José Antonio Sánchez Villalobos

13 February 2026 26	Almería	3–2	Andorra	Almería
20:30	Arribas 9'; de la Fuente 58'; Chirino (yellow card) 68'; Baba (yellow card) 77'; Baptistão 83'		Domènech (yellow card) 12'; García 39'; Carrique (yellow card) 42'; Villahermosa 52'; de León (penalty missed) 70', (yellow card) 90'; de Albéniz (yellow card) 90+5'	Stadium: UD Almería Stadium; Attendance: 11,875; Referee: Germán Cid Camacho

22 February 2026 27	Andorra	2–1	Zaragoza	Encamp
16:15	Cerdà 8', 23', (yellow card) 50'; de León (yellow card) 17'; Alende (yellow card) 90+2'		Aguirregabiria (yellow card) 25'; Insua (yellow card) 28' (red card) 51'; Gómez 52'; Agada (yellow card) 90+3'	Stadium: Estadi de la FAF; Attendance: 2,130; Referee: Eder Mallo Fernández

2 March 2026 28	Córdoba	1–4	Andorra	Córdoba
20:30	Adilson 89'		de León 9'; Villahermosa (yellow card) 12'; Cerdà 15'; Kim Min-su 30'; Vilà (yellow card) 65'; Le Normand 74'; Petxarroman (yellow card) 90'	Stadium: Estadio Nuevo Arcángel; Attendance: 15,024; Referee: Gorka Etayo Herrera

8 March 2026 29	Andorra	1–0	Sporting Gijón	Encamp
17:15	Vilà (yellow card) 29'; Le Normand (yellow card) 44'; Cerdà (yellow card) 65'; García (yellow card) 75'; Bernal 90+4' (o.g.)		Rosas (yellow card) 50'; Gelbart (yellow card) 69'	Stadium: Estadi de la FAF; Attendance: 2,210; Referee: Manuel Jesús Orellana Cid

15 March 2026 30	Granada	1–1	Andorra	Granada
17:15	Arnaiz 22', (yellow card) 78'; Lama (yellow card) 31'; Ruiz (yellow card) 42'; Pascual (yellow card) 87'		de Albéniz 27'; Villahermosa (yellow card) 49'; Molina (yellow card) 61'; Alonso (yellow card) 87'	Stadium: Nuevo Estadio de Los Cármenes; Attendance: 14,645; Referee: Marta Huerta De Aza

21 March 2026 31	Andorra	0–1	Eibar	Encamp
17:15	Alosno (yellow card) 51'; Cabanzón (yellow card) 87'; Kim Min-su (yellow card) 90+2'; Owono (yellow card) 90+6'		Nolaskoain 38'; Álvarez (yellow card) 67'; Magunagoitia (yellow card) 80'; Madariaga (yellow card) 89'; Magunazelaia (yellow card) 90+1'	Stadium: Estadi de la FAF; Attendance: 2,421; Referee: Alonso De Ena Wolf

29 March 2026 32	Cultural Leonesa	0–4	Andorra	León
16:15	Ribeiro (penalty missed) 35', (yellow card) 45'; Calero (yellow card) 89'; Barzic (yellow card) 90+3'		de León 5'; Domènech 32'; Alende (yellow card) 37'; Vilà (yellow card) 45+3'; Nieto 79'; Cabanzón 83'	Stadium: Estadio Reino de León; Attendance: 8,920; Referee: Manuel Ángel Pérez Hernández

1 April 2026 33	Andorra	3–3	Málaga	Encamp
19:00	Alonso (yellow card) 45+3'; Cerdà 51', 57'; Vilà (yellow card) 63'; Alende (yellow card) 77'; de León 80'; Le Normand (yellow card) 90+1'		Murillo 22', (yellow card) 90+6'; Jauregi 45+4' (pen.); Dorrio (yellow card) 71'; Gabilondo (yellow card) 77'; Montero 82'	Stadium: Estadi de la FAF; Attendance: 1,722; Referee: Alejandro Ojaos Valera

5 April 2026 34	Andorra	6–2	Racing Santander	Encamp
16:15	Cerdà 34'; de León 42'; Vilà 48'; Villahermosa 62' (pen.); García (yellow card) 76', (goal) 77'; Le Normand (yellow card) 89'		Guliashvili 4', 16'; Castro (yellow card) 19'; García (yellow card) 53'; Salinas (red card) 73'; Puerta (yellow card) 79'; Villalibre (yellow card) 80'	Stadium: Estadi de la FAF; Attendance: 2,732; Referee: Sergiu Claudiu Muresan

12 April 2026 35	Cádiz	0–1	Andorra	Cádiz
18:30	Kouamé (yellow card) 28'; Ocampo (yellow card) 52'; Recio (yellow card) 80'; Fernández (yellow card) 90+3'		Alende (yellow card) 15'; Cerdà 35'; Min-su (yellow card) 54'	Stadium: Nuevo Mirandilla; Attendance: 13,665; Referee: Eder Mallo Fernández

19 April 2026 36	Andorra	1–0	Valladolid	Encamp
14:00	Domènech (yellow card) 35'; Cardona 62'		Biuk (yellow card) 72'; Latasa (yellow card) 75'; Jurić (yellow card) 84'; Torres (yellow card) 90+6'	Stadium: Estadi de la FAF; Attendance: 2,200; Referee: Manuel Jesús Orellana Cid
