= Beto Company =

Spanish football manager (born 1990)

Personal information
- Full name: Albert Company Vengut
- Date of birth: 14 January 1979 (age 47)
- Place of birth: Valencia, Spain
- Position: Defender

Team information
- Current team: Hércules (manager)

Youth career
- EF Valls

Senior career*
Years	Team	Apps	(Gls)
- Joventut Bisbalenca
- Sant Pere i Sant Pau
- Oleastrum
2004–2011	Valls		
2011–2012	Benicarló		
2012	Valls		

Managerial career
- EF Valls (youth)
- 2012: Benicarló (assistant)
- 2012–2014: Benicarló
- 2014–2015: Gimnàstic (youth)
- 2015–2017: Amposta
- 2017–2018: Reus B (assistant)
- 2018–2019: Reus B
- 2019–2020: Pobla Mafumet
- 2022: Rapitenca
- 2023: Atlètic Lleida
- 2024–2025: Andorra (assistant)
- 2025: Andorra
- 2025–: Hércules
- * Club domestic league appearances and goals

Albert "Beto" Company Vengut (born 14 January 1979) is a Spanish retired footballer who played as a defender, and is the current manager of Hércules CF.

== Playing career ==
Known as just Beto as a player, he was born in Valencia but played the most of his career in Catalonia. An EF Valls youth graduate, he made his senior debut with Joventut Bisbalenca CF, and subsequently represented CEF Sant Pere i Sant Pau and CF Oleastrum before joining UE Valls in 2004.

In 2011, after establishing himself as a starter and team captain at Valls, Beto announced that it would be his last season as a senior. On 26 August of that year, after helping the club's promotion to Primera Catalana, he joined CD Benicarló.

On 28 December 2011, Beto agreed to return to Valls, but retired in the following year at the age of 33.

== Managerial career ==
Shortly after retiring, Company became an assistant of Juanjo Martorell at Benicarló; he had been previously working as a youth coach at EF Valls. On 12 December 2012, he was named manager of the club after Martorell was sacked.

In 2014, Company left Benicarló to join Gimnàstic de Tarragona, as an assistant of Manel Cazorla in the Juvenil squad. On 9 November 2015, he was appointed in charge of CF Amposta in the fifth division.

On 17 July 2017, Company left Amposta and signed for CF Reus Deportiu, being an assistant of Lluís Albesa at the reserves. The following 1 February, he was named manager of the B's, after Albesa was promoted to the main squad.

After renewing his contract on 13 June 2018, Company left the Ganxets on 28 May 2019. On 18 June of that year, he returned to Nàstic after being appointed manager of farm team CF Pobla de Mafumet in Tercera División.

Sacked by Pobla on 15 December 2020, Company spent more than a year without a club before being named at the helm of Tercera Federación side UE Rapitenca on 8 June 2022. He left the latter club by mutual consent on 6 December, before taking over CE Atlètic Lleida on 25 April 2023.

On 12 July 2024, Company joined FC Andorra as Ferran Costa's assistant. On 20 January 2025, he was named manager of the side in Primera Federación, after Costa's dismissal.

Company led Andorra back to Segunda División after achieving promotion in the play-offs, but left on 25 June 2025 as his contract was due to expire. On 17 November, he returned to the third division after being named in charge of Hércules CF, replacing sacked Rubén Torrecilla.

== Managerial statistics ==
As of 8 November 2026

Managerial record by team and tenure
Team	Nat	From	To	Record								Ref
Team	Nat	From	To	G	W	D	L	GF	GA	GD	Win %	Ref
Benicarló	(Spain)	12 December 2012	30 June 2014	53	23	11	19	73	72	+1	43.40	
Amposta	(Spain)	9 November 2015	17 July 2017	58	22	17	19	88	71	+17	37.93	
Reus B	(Spain)	1 February 2018	28 May 2019	55	19	17	19	69	62	+7	34.55	
Pobla Mafumet	(Spain)	19 June 2019	15 December 2020	35	15	7	13	46	42	+4	42.86	
Rapitenca	(Spain)	8 June 2022	6 December 2022	13	2	4	7	12	21	−9	15.38	
Atlètic Lleida	(Spain)	25 April 2023	1 June 2023	5	1	0	4	6	11	−5	20.00	
Andorra	(Andorra)	20 January 2025	25 June 2025	22	12	6	4	31	17	+14	54.55	
Hércules	(Spain)	17 November 2025	Present	37	15	12	10	44	41	+3	40.54	
Career total				278	109	74	95	369	337	+32	39.21	—
