= Jorge Díaz (footballer, born 1989) =

Uruguayan footballer

Personal information
- Full name: Jorge Luis Díaz Gutiérrez
- Date of birth: 28 June 1989 (age 37)
- Place of birth: Montevideo, Uruguay
- Height: 1.69 m (5 ft 7 in)
- Position: Winger

Team information
- Current team: Panionios
- Number: 11

Youth career
- Cambrils

Senior career*
Years	Team	Apps	(Gls)
2007–2009	Cambrils	33	(4)
2009–2010	Amposta	17	(0)
2010–2011	Reddis	6	(0)
2011–2012	Reus	52	(1)
2012–2013	Espanyol B	16	(1)
2013–2015	Albacete	87	(12)
2015–2017	Zaragoza	19	(1)
2016	→ Numancia (loan)	4	(0)
2016–2017	→ Reus (loan)	52	(1)
2017–2023	Panetolikos	171	(10)
2023–2024	Chania	26	(1)
2024–2026	A.E. Kifisia	30	(0)
2026–	Panionios	11	(0)
- * Club domestic league appearances and goals as of 19 September 2026

Jorge Luis Díaz Gutiérrez (born 28 June 1989) is a Uruguayan professional footballer who plays as a winger for Super League Greece 2 club Panionios.

== Career ==
Born in Montevideo, Díaz moved to Spain at early age and graduated from FC Cambrils's youth ranks, making his senior debuts in the 2007–08 campaign. In the 2009 summer he joined CF Amposta in Tercera División.

Cruz joined CF Reddis, CF Reus Deportiu's farm team in 2010. He was promoted to the main squad in January of the following year, appearing regularly and being promoted to Segunda División B with the Catalans at the end of the season. On 1 February 2012 he moved to RCD Espanyol, being assigned to the reserves also in the fourth level.

Díaz appeared rarely for the Pericos during his one-year spell, and moved to Albacete Balompié on 25 January 2013. With the latter he achieved promotion to Segunda División, scoring six goals in 39 matches.

On 24 August 2014 Díaz played his first match as a professional, starting in a 2–3 home loss against AD Alcorcón. He scored his first goal six days later, in a 1–1 away draw against CD Tenerife.

On 6 July 2015, Díaz signed a three-year deal with fellow league team Real Zaragoza. On 1 February of the following year, however, he was loaned to CD Numancia in the same division.

On 4 July 2016, Díaz returned to his former club Reus, newly promoted to the second tier, in a one-year loan deal. Roughly one year later, he signed a two-year contract with Greek club Panetolikos.

== Career statistics ==
As of 1 June 2021

Club	Season	League			Cup		Continental		Other		Total	
Club	Season	Division	Apps	Goals	Apps	Goals	Apps	Goals	Apps	Goals	Apps	Goals
Espanyol B	2012–13	Segunda División B	16	1	0	0	—		—		16	1
Albacete	2012–13	Segunda División B	16	1	0	0	—		—		16	1
Albacete	2013–14	Segunda División B	39	6	1	0	—		—		40	6
Albacete	2014–15	Segunda División	32	5	2	0	—		—		34	5
Albacete	Total		87	12	3	0	—		—		90	12
Zaragoza	2015–16	Segunda División	18	1	1	0	—		—		19	1
Numancia (loan)	2015–16	Segunda División	4	0	0	0	—		—		4	0
Reus (loan)	2016–17	Segunda División	34	1	0	0	—		—		34	1
Panetolikos	2017–18	Super League Greece	29	5	4	0	—		—		33	5
Panetolikos	2018–19	Super League Greece	25	0	2	0	—		—		27	0
Panetolikos	2019–20	Super League Greece	30	2	4	0	—		—		34	2
Panetolikos	2020–21	Super League Greece	34	0	0	0	—		—		34	0
Panetolikos	Total		118	7	10	0	0	0	—		128	7
Career total			295	22	14	0	0	0	0	0	309	22
