= Pau Casadesús =

Spanish footballer

Personal information
- Full name: Pau Casadesús Castro
- Date of birth: 30 October 2003 (age 23)
- Place of birth: Vallirana, Spain
- Height: 1.83 m (6 ft 0 in)
- Position: Right-back

Team information
- Current team: Granada
- Number: 2

Youth career
- Gimnàstic Manresa

Senior career*
Years	Team	Apps	(Gls)
2021–2025	Andorra	16	(1)
2023–2024	→ Espanyol B (loan)	47	(0)
2025–	Granada	25	(1)
- * Club domestic league appearances and goals as of 9 June 2026

Pau Casadesús Castro (born 30 October 2003) is a Spanish professional footballer who plays as a right-back for Segunda División club Granada CF.

== Club career ==
Born in Vallirana, Barcelona, Catalonia, Casadesús represented Club Gimnàstic de Manresa as a youth, and also began to train with the first team of FC Andorra in 2021, one year after a collaboration agreement between the two clubs was arranged. He made his senior debut with the latter club on 30 November 2021, coming on as a late substitute for Adrià Altimira in a 1–0 away win over Náxara CD, for the season's Copa del Rey.

Casadesús made his professional debut on 15 August 2022, replacing Carlos Martínez and scoring a last-minute winner in a 1–0 away win over Real Oviedo; it was also Andorra's first goal in a professional competition. The following 20 January, he was loaned to Segunda Federación side RCD Espanyol B until the end of the season.

Back to Andorra in July 2024, Casadesús spent the campaign as a backup to Jesús Clemente as the club returned to the second division. On 29 June 2025, he signed a three-year deal with Granada CF.
