= Kim Min-su (footballer, born 2006) =

South Korean footballer

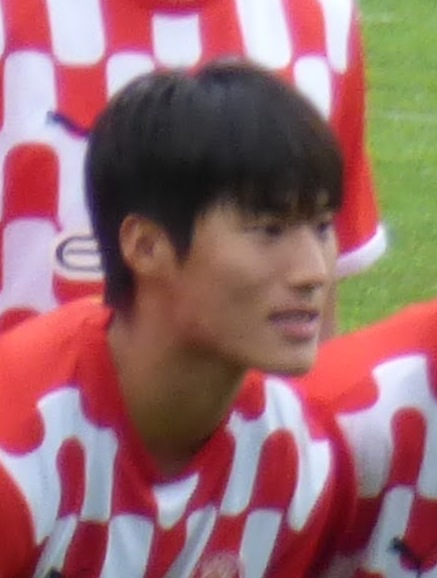
- Kim with Girona in 2024

Personal information
- Date of birth: 19 January 2006 (age 20)
- Place of birth: Gwangju, Gyeonggi, South Korea
- Height: 1.77 m (5 ft 10 in)
- Positions: Winger; attacking midfielder

Team information
- Current team: Rangers
- Number: 10

Youth career
- Gwangju Elementary School
- 2016–2018: PB Cinc Copes
- 2018–2020: Premier Barcelona
- 2020: Mercantil
- 2020–2022: Damm
- 2022–2023: Girona

Senior career*
Years	Team	Apps	(Gls)
2022–2025	Girona B	78	(17)
2024–2026	Girona	5	(0)
2025–2026	→ Andorra (loan)	40	(6)
2026–	Rangers	11	(0)

International career^{‡}
2026–	South Korea	3	(0)
- * Club domestic league appearances and goals as of 22 November 2026 ‡ National team caps and goals as of 2 October 2026

Kim Min-su (Korean: 김민수; born 19 January 2006) is a South Korean professional footballer who plays as a winger or attacking midfielder for Scottish Premiership club Rangers and the South Korea national team.

== Early life ==
Born in Gwangju, Gyeonggi, South Korea, Kim moved to Spain in 2016 and joined Penya Blaugrana Cinc Copes. Then, he joined Escola de Futbol Premier Barcelona after two seasons, and CE Mercantil's youth sides in 2020.

In 2022, after two years at Damm, Kim joined Girona and was initially assigned to the Juvenil squad.

== Club career ==
=== Girona ===
Kim made his senior debut with Girona B on 30 October 2022, coming on as a second-half substitute for Jastin García in a 1–0 Tercera Federación home loss to Peralada. He scored his first goal on 18 December, netting the B team's third in a 4–3 away win over Vilassar de Mar.

On 21 August 2024, after establishing himself as a regular starter for the B team, Kim renewed his contract until 2027. He made his first team debut and La Liga debut on 19 October, replacing Alejandro Francés in a 1–0 home loss to Real Sociedad. He scored 11 goals in the regular season and two goals in the promotion play-offs as he helped the B team promote to the Segunda Federación.

On 15 July 2025, Kim was loaned to Segunda División side Andorra, for one year. On 31 August, he scored his first goal for Andorra in a 2–1 win over Burgos. Back to Girona in July 2026, he was assigned to the main squad also in division two in the following month.

=== Rangers ===
On 27 August 2026, Kim signed for Scottish Premiership club Rangers on a four-year deal with the option of a further year.

== International career ==
On 24 September 2026, Kim made his debut for the South Korea national team in a friendly against Ecuador.

== Career statistics ==
=== Club ===
As of match played 22 November 2026

Appearances and goals by club, season and competition
Club	Season	League			National cup (Note: Includes Copa del Rey)		League cup (Note: Includes Scottish League Cup)		Continental		Other		Total	
Club	Season	Division	Apps	Goals	Apps	Goals	Apps	Goals	Apps	Goals	Apps	Goals	Apps	Goals
Girona B	2022–23	Tercera Federación	18	2	—		—		—		—		18	2
Girona B	2023–24	Tercera Federación	32	4	—		—		—		—		32	4
Girona B	2024–25	Tercera Federación	28	11	—		—		—		6 (Note: Appearances in Tercera Federación play-offs)	2	34	13
Girona B	Total		78	17	—		—		—		6	2	84	19
Girona	2024–25	La Liga	3	0	2	0	—		1 (Note: Appearance in UEFA Champions League)	0	—		6	0
Girona	2026–27	Segunda División	2	0	0	0	—		—		—		2	0
Girona	Total		5	0	2	0	—		1	0	—		8	0
Andorra (loan)	2025–26	Segunda División	40	6	0	0	—		—		—		40	6
Rangers	2026–27	Scottish Premiership	11	0	0	0	2	0	—		—		13	0
career total			134	23	2	0	2	0	1	0	6	2	145	25
