= Josep Cerdà =

Spanish footballer

Personal information
- Full name: Josep Cerdà Amengual
- Date of birth: 4 February 2003 (age 23)
- Place of birth: Pollença, Spain
- Height: 1.75 m (5 ft 9 in)
- Position: Winger

Team information
- Current team: Mallorca

Youth career
- Montaura
- Mallorca
- Constància
- 2019–2022: Barcelona

Senior career*
Years	Team	Apps	(Gls)
2022–2024	Barcelona B	0	(0)
2022–2023	→ Olot (loan)	23	(2)
2023–2024	→ Ponferradina (loan)	23	(1)
2024–2026	Andorra	56	(16)
2026–	Mallorca	6	(0)
- * Club domestic league appearances and goals as of 11 October 2026

Josep Cerdà Amengual (born 4 February 2003) is a Spanish professional footballer who plays as a winger for Segunda División club RCD Mallorca.

== Career ==
Cerdà was born in Pollença, Mallorca, Balearic Islands, and played for CE Montaura, RCD Mallorca and CE Constància before joining FC Barcelona's La Masia on 28 June 2019. On 15 July 2022, he renewed his contract with the latter until 2024, being promoted to the reserves ahead of the 2022–23 season.

On 11 August 2022, however, Cerdà and Barça B teammate Saïdou Bah were loaned to Segunda Federación side UE Olot, for one year. On 1 September of the following year, he moved to Primera Federación side SD Ponferradina also in a temporary deal.

Cerdà left Barcelona on 30 June 2024, as his contract expired, and signed a two-year deal with FC Andorra fifteen days later. He was a regular starter during the campaign, scoring seven goals in 39 appearances overall as they returned to Segunda División in the play-offs; on 1 July 2025, he renewed his link until 2027.

After spending the first months of the season nursing an injury, Cerdà made his professional debut on 2 November 2025, coming on as a late substitute for Dani Villahermosa in a 0–0 home draw against Cádiz CF. He scored his first professional goal the following 10 January, netting the equalizer in a 1–1 home draw against Cultural y Deportiva Leonesa, and finished the season with ten goals.

On 7 August 2026, Cerdà returned to Mallorca on a four-year deal.

== Career statistics ==
As of match played 11 October 2026

Appearances and goals by club, season and competition
Club	Season	League			Cup		Other		Total	
Club	Season	Division	Apps	Goals	Apps	Goals	Apps	Goals	Apps	Goals
Barcelona B	2022–23	Primera Federación	0	0	—		—		0	0
Olot (loan)	2022–23	Segunda Federación	23	2	—		—		23	2
Ponferradina (loan)	2023–24	Primera Federación	23	2	1	0	2 (Note: Appearances in 2024 Segunda Federación play-offs)	0	26	1
Andorra	2024–25	Primera Federación	33	6	2	0	4 (Note: Appearances in 2025 Primera Federación play-offs)	1	39	7
Andorra	2025–26	Segunda División	23	10	2	1	—		25	11
Andorra	Total		56	16	4	1	4	1	64	18
Mallorca	2026–27	Segunda División	6	0	0	0	—		6	0
Career total			108	20	5	1	6	1	119	22
