= Marc Bombardó =

Spanish footballer

Personal information
- Full name: Marc Bombardó Poyato
- Date of birth: 23 November 2005 (age 20)
- Place of birth: Cerdanyola del Vallès, Spain
- Height: 1.82 m (6 ft 0 in)
- Position: Centre-back

Team information
- Current team: Andorra
- Number: 5

Youth career
- 2010–2013: Sant Quirze
- 2013–2018: Barcelona
- 2018–2020: Espanyol
- 2020–2024: Gimnàstic Manresa

Senior career*
Years	Team	Apps	(Gls)
2022–	Andorra	40	(1)

International career^{‡}
2025–	Catalonia	1	(0)
- * Club domestic league appearances and goals as of 9 June 2026 ‡ National team caps and goals as of 14:25, 19 November 2025 (UTC)

Marc Bombardó Poyato (born 23 November 2005), sometimes known as Bomba, is a Spanish professional footballer who plays for Segunda División club FC Andorra. Mainly a centre-back, he can also play as a right-back.

== Career ==
Born in Cerdanyola del Vallès, Barcelona, Catalonia, Bombardó joined FC Barcelona's La Masia in 2013, from FC Sant Quirze; initially a goalkeeper, he was later moved to midfield before becoming a centre-back at Barça. He left the side in 2018 to join RCD Espanyol, but moved to FC Andorra in 2020 and was assigned to affiliate team Club Gimnàstic de Manresa.

On 22 September 2022, Bombardó renewed his contract with Andorra until 2025. He started to become a part of the first team in the 2022–23 season, but only featured in Copa Catalunya matches.

On 21 July 2024, Bombardó was definitely promoted to the first team of Andorra, now in Primera Federación. Initially a backup to Diego Alende, Pablo Trigueros and César Morgado, he became a first-choice after the arrival of Beto Company as manager, and contributed with one goal in 26 appearances overall during the campaign as the club achieved promotion to Segunda División.

On 28 June 2025, Bombardó further extended his link with the Tricolors until 2027. He made his professional debut on 17 August, starting in a 1–1 away draw against UD Las Palmas.

== International career ==
Bombardó debuted with the Catalonia team in a friendly 2–1 win over Palestine on 18 November 2025.
