= Juan Palomares =

Spanish footballer

Personal information
- Full name: Juan Palomares Pulpillo
- Date of birth: 25 July 2000 (age 26)
- Place of birth: Rus, Spain
- Height: 1.87 m (6 ft 2 in)
- Position: Goalkeeper

Team information
- Current team: Eldense
- Number: 13

Youth career
- PMJD Baeza
- Rus
- 2015–2017: Linares
- 2017–2018: Córdoba
- 2018–2019: Almería

Senior career*
| Years | Team | Apps | (Gls) |
| 2019–2020 | Gerena | 2 | (0) |
| 2020–2021 | Torredonjimeno | 12 | (0) |
| 2021–2022 | Sanluqueño | 2 | (0) |
| 2022–2025 | Mérida | 89 | (0) |
| 2025–2026 | Mirandés | 26 | (0) |
| 2026– | Eldense | 0 | (0) |
- * Club domestic league appearances and goals as of 9 June 2026

Juan Palomares Pulpillo (born 25 July 2000), sometimes known as Juanpa, is a Spanish footballer who plays as a goalkeeper for CD Eldense.

== Career ==
Palomares was born in Rus, Jaén, Andalusia, and represented Patronato Municipal de Juventud y Deportes de Baeza, CD Rus, Linares Deportivo, Córdoba CF and UD Almería as a youth. In 2019, after finishing his formation, he signed for Tercera División side CD Gerena.

After being a backup option, Palomares moved to fellow fourth division side UD Ciudad de Torredonjimeno on 4 July 2020. Again a second-choice, he signed for Atlético Sanluqueño CF in Primera División RFEF on 16 June of the following year.

After failing to win competition over veteran Ismael Falcón, Palomares agreed to a one-year deal with fellow third division side Mérida AD on 7 July 2022. The following 31 May, after establishing himself as a first-choice, he renewed his contract for two further seasons.

On 10 July 2025, Palomares joined Segunda División side CD Mirandés on a one-year deal. He made his professional debut on 17 August, starting in a 1–0 away loss to Cádiz CF.

On 7 July 2026, after suffering relegation, Palomares agreed to a one-year contract with CD Eldense, also in division two.
