= Manuel Nieto =

Manuel Nieto may refer to:

- Manuel Nieto (born 1892) Filipino footballer, businessman, politician and military official
- Manuel Nieto Cacciuttolo (1890–?), Chilean politician
- Manuel Nieto (footballer) (born 1998), Spanish footballer
- Manuel Nieto (soldier) (1734–1804), Mexican soldier
