= Séneca CF =

Association football club in Spain

Séneca
- Full name: Séneca Club de Fútbol
- Founded: 1963; 63 years ago
- Ground: Enrique Puga, Córdoba, Andalusia, Spain
- Capacity: 2,000
- League: Liga Nacional Juvenil
- 2023–24: División de Honor – Group 4, 16th of 18
Home colours

Séneca Club de Fútbol is a Spanish football team based in Córdoba, in the autonomous community of Andalusia. Founded in 1963, it is dedicated to youth football.

The club also had a senior men's team playing in the regional leagues in the 2000s, while a senior women's team played in the 2011–12 Segunda División.

== Season to season ==
Season	Tier	Division	Place	Copa del Rey
1973–74	6	3ª Reg.	1st	
1974–2000	DNP			
2000–01	6	1ª Reg.	7th	
2001–02	6	1ª Reg.	1st	
2002–03	5	Reg. Pref.	9th	
2003–04	5	Reg. Pref.	15th	
2004–05	6	Reg. Pref.	14th	

== Famous players ==
Note: List consists of players who appeared in La Liga or reached international status.

- (Spain) Miguel Baeza
- (Spain) Antonio Blanco
- (Spain) Rafael Clavero
- (Spain) Rubén Cuesta
- (Spain) Gaspar Gálvez
- (Spain) Álvaro Medrán
- (Spain) Manu Nieto
- (Spain) Alfonso Pedraza
- (Spain) Javi Pineda
- (Spain) Quini
- (Spain) Antonio Raíllo
- (Spain) Alberto Toril
