= Rubén Cuesta =

Spanish footballer (born 1981)

Personal information
- Full name: Rubén de la Cuesta Vera
- Date of birth: 11 September 1981 (age 45)
- Place of birth: Córdoba, Spain
- Height: 1.80 m (5 ft 11 in)
- Position: Midfielder

Team information
- Current team: Séneca (youth)

Youth career
- Séneca

Senior career*
Years	Team	Apps	(Gls)
2000–2003	Córdoba B	61	(16)
2001	Córdoba	3	(0)
2003–2004	Écija	30	(2)
2004–2006	Atlético Madrid B	60	(1)
2006–2007	Zamora	34	(6)
2007–2011	Guadalajara	124	(12)
2011–2012	Lucena	31	(1)
2012–2013	Linense	35	(3)
2013–2015	Universitario Sucre	70	(7)
2015–2016	Oriente Petrolero	17	(0)
2016	Jumilla	13	(1)
2016–2017	Real Potosí	27	(0)
2017–2018	Atlético Sanluqueño	30	(5)
2018–2019	Always Ready		
Total		535	(54)
- * Club domestic league appearances and goals

Rubén de la Cuesta Vera (born 11 September 1981), known as Cuesta, is a Spanish former footballer who played as a central midfielder.

He all but spent his entire professional career in the Bolivian Primera División.

== Playing career ==
Born in Córdoba, Andalusia, Cuesta appeared in three Segunda División matches with Córdoba CF's first team. His debut in the competition was on 20 May 2001, as a late substitute in the 2–0 away loss against Sevilla FC.

Cuesta then spent ten seasons in the Segunda División B, representing Écija Balompié, Atlético Madrid B, Zamora CF, CD Guadalajara, Lucena CF and Real Balompédica Linense. He then took his game to the Bolivian Primera División, where he played for Universitario de Sucre and Oriente Petrolero and won the 2014 Clausura with the former club.

In February 2019, Cuesta retired at the age of 37 following spells with FC Jumilla (Spanish third tier), Club Real Potosí (Bolivia, top flight), Atlético Sanluqueño CF (Tercera División) and Club Always Ready (Bolivia, where he conquered the Copa Simón Bolívar and thus earned promotion).

== Coaching career ==
After retiring, Cuesta began working as youth manager at his first club Séneca CF.

== Personal life ==
Cuesta's father, Manuel (nicknamed Manolín), was also a footballer. A forward, he appeared for both Córdoba and RCD Espanyol in La Liga.
