= Alejandro Ibarrondo =

Spanish footballer

Personal information
- Full name: Alejandro Ibarrondo Gorostidi
- Date of birth: 16 May 2001 (age 25)
- Place of birth: Bilbao, Spain
- Height: 1.83 m (6 ft 0 in)
- Positions: Right-back; winger

Team information
- Current team: Eldense
- Number: 19

Youth career
- 2011–2019: Athletic Bilbao

Senior career*
Years	Team	Apps	(Gls)
2019–2022	Basconia	41	(2)
2021–2022	→ Laredo (loan)	33	(2)
2022–2023	Calahorra	32	(0)
2023–2024	Granada B	26	(0)
2024–2025	Arenas Getxo	34	(4)
2025	Andorra	0	(0)
2025–	Eldense	35	(0)
- * Club domestic league appearances and goals as of 29 August 2026

Alejandro Ibarrondo Gorostidi (born 16 May 2001) is a Spanish professional footballer who plays as either a right-back or a right winger for CD Eldense.

== Career ==
Born in Bilbao, Biscay, Basque Country, Ibarrondo joined Athletic Bilbao's youth academy at Lezama in 2011, aged ten. He was promoted to farm team CD Basconia ahead of the 2019–20 season, before moving on loan to Segunda División RFEF side CD Laredo on 2 July 2021.

On 22 June 2022, Ibarrondo signed with Primera Federación side CD Calahorra. He was regularly used as the club suffered relegation, being also deployed as a right-back in the last matches.

On 31 July 2023, Ibarrondo was announced at Granada CF, being initially assigned to the reserves also in the third division. On 22 August of the following year, after another relegation, he moved to Segunda Federación side Arenas Club de Getxo.

On 13 July 2025, after helping Arenas to achieve promotion, Ibarrondo and teammate Aitor Uzkudun signed a two-year contract with Segunda División side FC Andorra. On 13 August, however, he was transferred to CD Eldense in division three, agreeing to a two-year deal.

Ibarrondo was regularly used during the 2025–26 campaign, featuring in 37 matches overall as the club returned to division two at first attempt. He made his professional debut at the age of 25 on 29 August 2026, coming on as a late substitute for Jesús Clemente in a 1–0 away loss to CD Leganés.
