= Aitor Uzkudun =

Spanish footballer

Personal information
- Full name: Aitor Uzkudun Arruti
- Date of birth: 13 December 2000 (age 25)
- Place of birth: San Sebastián, Spain
- Height: 1.83 m (6 ft 0 in)
- Position: Forward

Team information
- Current team: Mirandés (on loan from Andorra)

Youth career
- Real Sociedad
- Eibar

Senior career*
Years	Team	Apps	(Gls)
2019–2021	Eibar Urko		
2021–2023	Vitoria	49	(8)
2023–2024	Calahorra	30	(2)
2024–2025	Arenas Getxo	32	(9)
2025–	Andorra	13	(0)
2026	→ Avilés Industrial (loan)	13	(3)
2026–	→ Mirandés (loan)	0	(0)
- * Club domestic league appearances and goals as of 23 May 2026

Aitor Uzkudun Arruti (born 13 December 2000) is a Spanish professional footballer who plays as a forward for CD Mirandés, on loan from FC Andorra.

== Career ==
Born in San Sebastián, Gipuzkoa, Basque Country, Uzkudun played for Real Sociedad and SD Eibar as a youth. In July 2019, after finishing his formation, he was assigned to second reserve team SD Eibar Urko.

On 9 July 2021, Uzkudun was promoted to farm team CD Vitoria in Tercera División RFEF. On 21 July 2023, after scoring six goals as Vitoria achieved promotion to Segunda Federación, he moved to CD Calahorra also in division four.

On 5 June 2024, Uzkudun joined Arenas Club de Getxo also in the fourth tier. He scored nine goals during the campaign, being a key unit as the club achieved promotion to Primera Federación.

On 13 July 2025, Uzkudun and Arenas teammate Alejandro Ibarrondo signed a two-year contract with Segunda División side FC Andorra. He made his professional debut on 17 August, coming on as a late substitute for Lautaro de León in a 1–1 away draw against UD Las Palmas.

On 27 January 2026, Uzkudun renewed his contract with the Tricolors until 2028, and was loaned to Primera Federación club Real Avilés Industrial CF until June. On 18 August, he joined fellow league team CD Mirandés also in a temporary deal.
