= Javier Olaizola (footballer, born 2007) =

Spanish footballer

Personal information
- Full name: Javier Olaizola Jiménez
- Date of birth: 15 March 2007 (age 19)
- Place of birth: Palma, Spain
- Position: Centre-back

Team information
- Current team: Eldense (on loan from Mallorca)
- Number: 34

Youth career
- Mallorca

Senior career*
| Years | Team | Apps | (Gls) |
| 2025–2026 | Mallorca B | 22 | (1) |
| 2025– | Mallorca | 2 | (0) |
| 2026– | → Eldense (loan) | 1 | (0) |
- * Club domestic league appearances and goals as of 17 August 2026

Javier Olaizola Jiménez (born 15 March 2007) is a Spanish professional footballer who plays as a centre-back for CD Eldense, on loan from RCD Mallorca.

== Career ==
Born in Palma, Mallorca, Balearic Islands, Olaizola is a product of RCD Mallorca's youth categories. On 12 March 2025, while still a youth, he renewed his contract until 2028.

Olaizola made his senior debut with the B-team on 6 April 2025, starting in a 1–0 Segunda Federación home loss to UE Olot. He made his first team debut on 29 October, starting in a 2–0 away win over Atlètic Sant Just FC, for the season's Copa del Rey.

Olaizola made his professional – and La Liga – debut on 17 May 2026, coming on as a half-time substitute for fellow youth graduate David López in a 2–0 away loss to Levante UD. On 5 August, he was loaned to Segunda División side CD Eldense for one year.

== Personal life ==
Olaizola's father, also named Javier, was also a footballer. A right-back, he too played for Mallorca and also managed the first team.

== Career statistics ==
As of match played 23 May 2026

Appearances and goals by club, season and competition
| Club | Season | League | | | Cup | | Other | | Total | |
| Club | Season | Division | Apps | Goals | Apps | Goals | Apps | Goals | Apps | Goals |
|---|---|---|---|---|---|---|---|---|---|---|
| Mallorca B | 2024–25 | Segunda Federación | 5 | 0 | — | | — | | 5 | 0 |
| Mallorca B | 2025–26 | Segunda Federación | 17 | 0 | — | | — | | 17 | 0 |
| Mallorca B | Total | | 22 | 0 | — | | — | | 22 | 0 |
| Mallorca | 2025–26 | La Liga | 2 | 0 | 1 | 0 | — | | 3 | 0 |
| Career total | | | 24 | 0 | 1 | 0 | 0 | 0 | 25 | 0 |
