= Áron Yaakobishvili =

Hungarian footballer (born 2006)

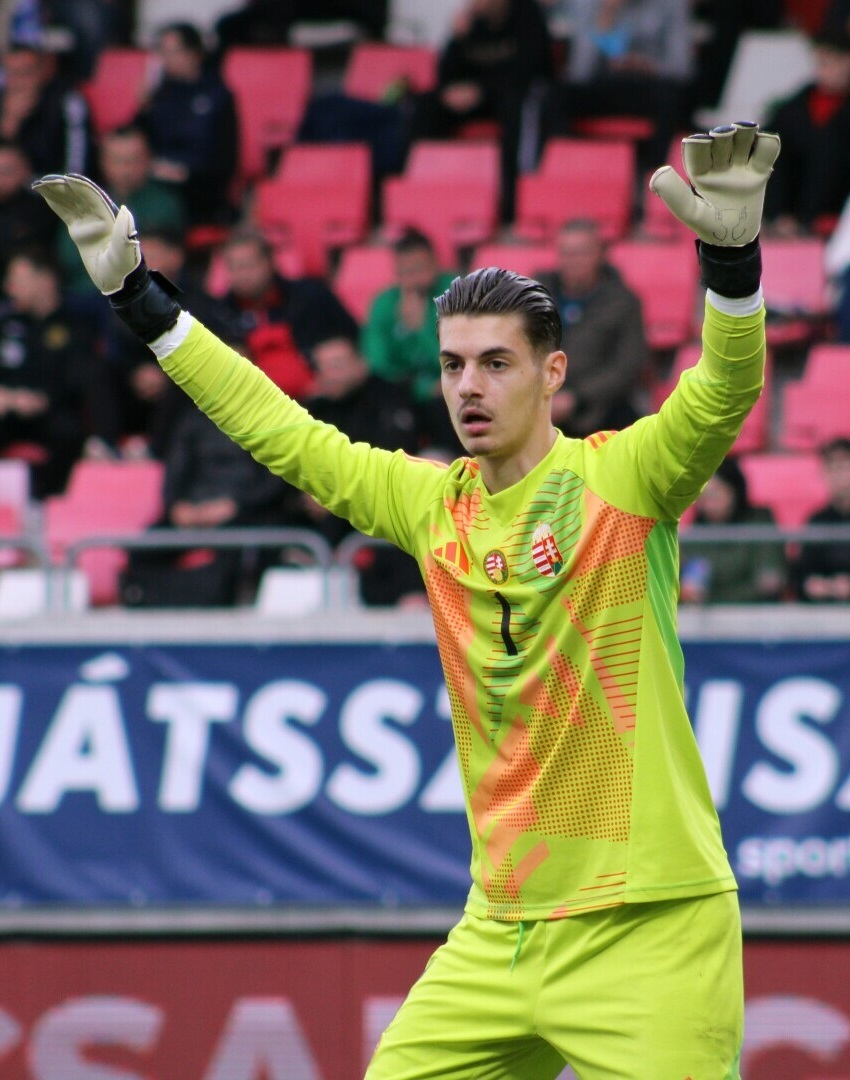
- Yaakobishvili playing for Hungary U19 in 2025

Personal information
- Full name: Áron Yaakobishvili
- Date of birth: 6 March 2006 (age 20)
- Place of birth: Budapest, Hungary
- Height: 1.87 m (6 ft 2 in)
- Position: Goalkeeper

Team information
- Current team: Almería (on loan from Barcelona)

Youth career
- 2012–2014: Baráti Bőrlabda
- 2014–2016: Angyalföldi Sportiskola
- 2016–2017: MTK Budapest
- 2017–2018: Atlètic Sant Just
- 2018–2025: Barcelona

Senior career*
Years	Team	Apps	(Gls)
2024–	Barcelona B	3	(0)
2025–2026	→ Andorra (loan)	21	(0)
2026–	→ Almería (loan)	0	(0)

International career^{‡}
2022–2023	Hungary U17	8	(0)
2024–2025	Hungary U18	8	(0)
2025	Hungary U21	1	(0)
2026–	Hungary	1	(0)
- * Club domestic league appearances and goals as of 1 May 2026 ‡ National team caps and goals as of 21:15, 6 June 2026 (UTC)

Áron Yaakobishvili (Georgian: აარონ იაკობიშვილი; Hebrew: ארון יעקובישווילי; born 6 March 2006) is a Hungarian professional footballer who plays as a goalkeeper for Segunda División club Almería, on loan from Barcelona, and the Hungary national team.

== Early life ==
Yaakobishvili was born in Budapest, Hungary to a Georgian Jewish father; his father was born in Georgia, and is a dual Georgian-Israeli citizen whilst his mother is Hungarian. His elder brother, Antal, is also a footballer, and currently plays for fellow Spanish club Girona.

== Club career ==
Yaakobishvili joined local side Baráti Bőrlabda at the age of six in 2012, before moving to Angyalföldi Sportiskola two years later. He spent a season with MTK Budapest before moving to Spain in 2017 after his mother had accepted a job in Barcelona. On his arrival in Spain, he had a short spell with amateur side Atlètic Sant Just, before being invited on a three-day trial with Barcelona the following year, joining the club after impressing coaches.

Having progressed through Barcelona's La Masia academy, Yaakobishvili signed his first professional contract with the club in February 2022. In March of the same year, he trained with the Barcelona first team. On 11 October 2023, he was named by English newspaper The Guardian as one of the best players born in 2006 worldwide.

Yaakobishvili was first included into the senior team's match day squad on 25 November 2023 for a La Liga game against Rayo Vallecano. Yaakobishvili made his senior debut for the reserve team Barcelona Atlètic in the third-tier Primera Federación on 27 September 2024 against SD Tarazona.

On 15 July 2025, Yaakobishvili agreed to a one-year loan deal with Segunda División side FC Andorra. He made his professional debut on 17 August, starting in a 1–1 away draw against UD Las Palmas, and shared the starting spot with another loanee, Jesús Owono, over the course of the season.

On 20 August 2026, Yaakobishvili moved to fellow second division side UD Almería also on a one-year loan deal.

== International career ==
Yaakobishvili has represented Hungary at youth international level. In June 2023, it was reported by Israeli sports journalism outlet Sport 5 that Yaakobishvili and his brother were attempting to gain Israeli citizenship so as to represent the nation at international level. However, their agent Attila Georgi denied these rumours, stating that the brothers were Hungarian and that they wanted to represent Hungary at international level. He was called up to the Hungary national team for a set of friendlies in June 2026.
