= Gorka Carrera =

Spanish footballer (born 2005)

Personal information
- Full name: Gorka Carrera Zarranz
- Date of birth: 15 May 2005 (age 21)
- Place of birth: Errenteria, Spain
- Height: 1.78 m (5 ft 10 in)
- Position: Forward

Team information
- Current team: Real Sociedad B
- Number: 18

Youth career
- Touring
- Vasconia Donostia
- 2022–2023: Real Sociedad

Senior career*
Years	Team	Apps	(Gls)
2023–2025	Real Sociedad C	25	(7)
2023–2024	→ Touring (loan)	30	(8)
2024–	Real Sociedad B	52	(16)
2025–	Real Sociedad	3	(0)
- * Club domestic league appearances and goals as of 9 June 2026

Gorka Carrera Zarranz (born 15 May 2005) is a Spanish footballer who plays as a forward for Real Sociedad B.

== Career ==
Born in Errenteria, Gipuzkoa, Basque Country, Carrera joined Real Sociedad's youth sides in 2022, from CD Vasconia de Donostia. He made his senior debut with the C-team on 8 January 2023, starting and scored the opener in a 4–2 Segunda Federación home loss to CD Izarra.

In July 2023, Carrera joined Touring KE, another club he represented as a youth, on loan. Back to the Txuri-urdin in July 2024, he was initially assigned back at the C's, and first appeared with the reserves on 2 November, in a 1–0 Primera Federación home loss to CD Arenteiro.

Carrera featured in both legs of the promotion play-off finals against Gimnàstic de Tarragona, and scored Sanse's third in the 3–1 win at the Nou Estadi Costa Daurada in the first leg; it was only his second goal with the side during the season, as the club achieved promotion to Segunda División.

Carrera made his professional debut on 17 August 2025, coming on as a second-half substitute for Arkaitz Mariezkurrena late into a 1–0 home win over Real Zaragoza. He scored his first professional goal twelve days later, netting the B's second in a 2–2 home draw against UD Almería, and netted a brace in a 3–0 home win over FC Andorra on 11 October.

Carrera made his first team – and La Liga – debut on 30 November 2025, replacing Gonçalo Guedes late into a 3–2 home loss to Villarreal CF.

== Career statistics ==
As of match played 9 May 2026

Appearances and goals by club, season and competition
Club	Season	League			Cup		Europe		Other		Total	
Club	Season	Division	Apps	Goals	Apps	Goals	Apps	Goals	Apps	Goals	Apps	Goals
Real Sociedad C	2022–23	Segunda Federación	1	1	—		—		—		1	1
Real Sociedad C	2024–25	Segunda Federación	24	6	—		—		—		24	6
Real Sociedad C	Total		25	7	—		—		—		25	7
Touring (loan)	2023–24	Tercera Federación	30	8	—		—		—		30	8
Real Sociedad B	2024–25	Primera Federación	15	1	—		—		2 (Note: Appearances in 2025 Primera Federación play-offs)	1	17	2
Real Sociedad B	2025–26	Segunda División	36	14	—		—		—		36	14
Real Sociedad B	Total		51	15	—		—		2	1	53	16
Real Sociedad	2025–26	La Liga	2	0	1	0	—		—		3	0
Career total			108	31	1	0	0	0	2	1	111	32
