= Jan Encuentra =

Spanish footballer

Personal information
- Full name: Jan Encuentra Martín
- Date of birth: 5 May 2006 (age 20)
- Place of birth: Tàrrega, Spain
- Height: 1.78 m (5 ft 10 in)
- Position: Right-back

Team information
- Current team: Villarreal B

Youth career
- 2011–2015: Tàrrega
- 2015–2019: Barcelona
- 2019–2022: Gimnàstic Manresa
- 2022–2025: Betis

Senior career*
Years	Team	Apps	(Gls)
2023–2025	Betis B	7	(0)
2025–2026	Andorra	0	(0)
2025–2026	→ Unionistas (loan)	21	(2)
2026–	Villarreal B	0	(0)
- * Club domestic league appearances and goals as of 9 June 2026

Jan Encuentra Martín (born 5 May 2006) is a Spanish professional footballer who plays as a right-back for Villarreal CF B.

== Career ==
Born in Tàrrega, Lleida, Catalonia, Encuentra began his career with hometown side UE Tàrrega before agreeing to join FC Barcelona's La Masia in April 2015, aged eight. He left the latter in 2019, and played for Club Gimnàstic de Manresa before signing for Real Betis in 2022.

Encuentra made his senior debut with Betis' reserves on 8 October 2023, starting in a 0–0 Segunda Federación away draw against Vélez CF. On 12 July 2025, he signed a three-year deal with Segunda División side FC Andorra, after his contract expired, but was loaned to third division side Unionistas de Salamanca CF on 1 August.

On 11 June 2026, Encuentra signed a three-year contract with Villarreal CF, being assigned to the B-team also in division three.
