= Martí Vilà =

Spanish footballer (born 1999)

Personal information
- Full name: Martí Vilà Garcia
- Date of birth: 26 May 1999 (age 27)
- Place of birth: Berga, Spain
- Height: 1.66 m (5 ft 5 in)
- Position: Left-back

Team information
- Current team: Andorra
- Number: 20

Youth career
- Berga
- Manresa
- 2009–2018: Barcelona

Senior career*
Years	Team	Apps	(Gls)
2018–2019	Reus B	33	(0)
2018	Reus	2	(0)
2019–2020	Deportivo B	25	(0)
2020–	Andorra	105	(1)

International career^{‡}
2025–	Catalonia	1	(0)
- * Club domestic league appearances and goals as of 9 June 2026 ‡ National team caps and goals as of 14:31, 19 November 2025 (UTC)

Martí Vilà Garcia (born 26 May 1999) is a Spanish professional footballer who plays as a left-back for Segunda División club FC Andorra.

== Club career ==
Born in Berga, Barcelona, Catalonia, Vilà joined FC Barcelona's La Masia in 2009, after stints at CE Manresa and CE Berga. He progressed through the youth setup and won the 2017–18 UEFA Youth League with the club, but was still released in 2018.

On 10 July 2018, Vilà signed for Segunda División side CF Reus Deportiu, being initially assigned to the reserves in Tercera División. He made his senior debut on 26 August, starting in a 1–2 home loss against FC Vilafranca.

Vilà made his professional debut on 30 September 2018, coming on as a first-half substitute for Fran Carbià in a 0–2 away loss against UD Almería. The following 11 July, he moved to another reserve team, Deportivo Fabril also in the fourth tier.

== International career ==
Vilà debuted with the Catalonia team in a friendly 2–1 win over Palestine on 18 November 2025.

== Honours ==
=== Club ===
Barcelona

- UEFA Youth League: 2017–18
