= Jesús Owono =

Equatoguinean footballer (born 2001)

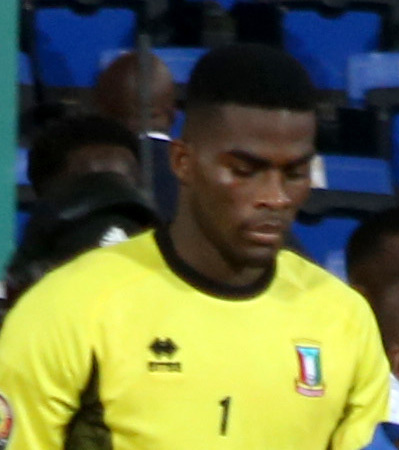
- Owono with Equatorial Guinea in 2022

Personal information
- Full name: Jesús Lázaro Owono Ngua (Note: Current full name under his Equatoguinean nationality.); Jesús Lázaro Ferrer Owono (Note: Current full name under his Spanish nationality. Previously, he was known as Jesús Lázaro Ngua Owono under that same nationality.)
- Birth name: Jesús Lázaro Owono Ngua Akeng
- Date of birth: 1 March 2001 (age 25)
- Place of birth: Bata, Equatorial Guinea
- Height: 1.83 m (6 ft 0 in)
- Position: Goalkeeper

Team information
- Current team: Andorra
- Number: 25

Youth career
- 2009–2013: Antiguoko
- 2013–2017: Real Sociedad
- 2016–2017: → Antiguoko (loan)
- 2017–2019: Alavés

Senior career*
Years	Team	Apps	(Gls)
2019–2021	San Ignacio	45	(0)
2021–2022	Alavés B	22	(0)
2021–2026	Alavés	12	(0)
2025–2026	→ Andorra (loan)	20	(0)
2026–	Andorra	6	(0)

International career^{‡}
- Basque Country U16
2019–	Equatorial Guinea	47	(0)
- * Club domestic league appearances and goals as of 09:03, 3 November 2026 (UTC) ‡ National team caps and goals as of 10:14, 3 November 2026 (UTC)

Jesús Lázaro Owono Ngua (born 1 March 2001) is an Equatoguinean professional footballer who plays as a goalkeeper for Segunda División club FC Andorra and the Equatorial Guinea national team.

== Early life ==
Owono was born in Bata, Litoral Province, Equatorial Guinea, and moved to the Basque Country of Spain during his childhood. He joined Antiguoko at age 8. He represented the Basque Country at under-16 level.

== Club career ==
Owono made his La Liga debut for Alavés on 2 January 2022. He is the first Equatorial Guinea international footballer born in the country to appear in a Spanish top-league match.

On 13 July 2025, Owono signed for Segunda División club Andorra on a one-year loan deal. On 26 August 2026, he signed a permanent two-year deal with the club.

== International career ==
Owono, at the age of 17, received his first senior call up by Equatorial Guinea in September 2018. He made his debut on 25 March 2019, playing the whole second half of a 3–2 friendly loss to Saudi Arabia. He was called up to the national team for the 2023 Africa Cup of Nations.

== Death of Jesús de Miguel ==
On 2 November 2026, Owono collided with Tenerife player Jesús de Miguel, which caused de Miguel to suffer a cardiac arrest. De Miguel was resuscitated on the way to the University Hospital of Nuestra Señora de Candelaria but died the following day. Owono was sent off, and police then opened proceedings for possible involuntary manslaughter. Owono released a statement saying "These are the most difficult days of my life…I know there will be many issues to address. I will face whatever comes with upmost respect. But right now, honestly, I cannot think about anything other than Jesús [de Miguel] and the pain we are experiencing. Rest in peace, Jesús."

On 13 November, Owono was given a 12-match suspension by Royal Spanish Football Federation for the collision.

== Career statistics ==
=== Club ===
As of match played 26 October 2026

Appearances and goals by club, season and competition
Club	Season	League			Copa del Rey		Other		Total	
Club	Season	Division	Apps	Goals	Apps	Goals	Apps	Goals	Apps	Goals
San Ignacio	2019–20	Tercera División	24	0	—		—		24	0
San Ignacio	2020–21	Tercera División	21	0	—		—		21	0
San Ignacio	Total		45	0	—		—		45	0
Alavés B	2021–22	Tercera División RFEF	22	0	—		—		22	0
Alavés	2021–22	La Liga	1	0	4	0	—		5	0
Alavés	2022–23	Segunda División	1	0	3	0	—		4	0
Alavés	2023–24	La Liga	4	0	1	0	—		5	0
Alavés	2024–25	La Liga	6	0	1	0	—		7	0
Alavés	Total		12	0	9	0	—		21	0
Andorra (loan)	2025–26	Segunda División	20	0	1	0	—		21	0
Andorra	2026–27	Segunda División	6	0	0	0	—		6	0
Andorra	Andorra total		26	0	1	0	—		27	0
Career total			105	0	10	0	0	0	115	0

=== International ===
As of match played 28 September 2026

Appearances and goals by national team and year
National team	Year	Apps	Goals
Equatorial Guinea	2019	1	0
Equatorial Guinea	2020	2	0
Equatorial Guinea	2021	7	0
Equatorial Guinea	2022	7	0
Equatorial Guinea	2023	7	0
Equatorial Guinea	2024	11	0
Equatorial Guinea	2025	9	0
Equatorial Guinea	2026	3	0
Total		47	0
