= Aingeru Olabarrieta =

Spanish footballer (born 2000)

Personal information
- Full name: Aingeru Olabarrieta Capelo
- Date of birth: 14 November 2005 (age 20)
- Place of birth: Luiaondo, Spain
- Height: 1.81 m (5 ft 11 in)
- Position: Winger

Team information
- Current team: Eldense (on loan from Athletic Bilbao)

Youth career
- Etorkizuna
- 2015–2023: Athletic Bilbao

Senior career*
Years	Team	Apps	(Gls)
2023–2025	Bilbao Athletic	55	(12)
2024–	Athletic Bilbao	2	(0)
2025–2026	→ Andorra (loan)	28	(1)
2026–	→ Eldense (loan)	0	(0)

International career^{‡}
2022–2023	Spain U18	4	(0)
2023–	Spain U19	2	(0)
- * Club domestic league appearances and goals as of 9 June 2026 ‡ National team caps and goals as of 17:21, 21 May 2024 (UTC)

Aingeru Olabarrieta Capelo (born 14 November 2005) is a Spanish professional footballer who plays as a right winger for Segunda División club CD Eldense, on loan from Athletic Bilbao.

== Club career ==
Olabarrieta joined the youth academy of Athletic Bilbao at the age of 10. On 1 July 2023, he signed a professional contract with the club. He was promoted to the Bilbao Athletic, the club's reserve team in Segunda Federación, for the 2023–24 season (skipping the usual step of CD Basconia, the farm team playing at a level below), and accumulated seven goals and ten assists in 29 games in his first season as the team won their group to achieve promotion. In early 2024 he started training with the senior team after his strong performances with the reserves. He made his professional debut for Athletic Bilbao as a substitute in a 2–0 La Liga win over Sevilla on 19 May 2024.

On 9 August 2025, Olabarrieta was loaned to Segunda División side FC Andorra for the season. On 31 August of the following year, he moved to fellow league team CD Eldense also in a temporary deal.

== International career ==
Olabarrieta is a youth international for Spain, having played up to the under-19s in 2023.

== Career statistics ==
As of match played 11 May 2025

Appearances and goals by club, season and competition
Club	Season	League			Cup		Europe		Other		Total	
Club	Season	Division	Apps	Goals	Apps	Goals	Apps	Goals	Apps	Goals	Apps	Goals
Bilbao Athletic	2023–24	Segunda Federación	29	7	—		—		—		29	7
Bilbao Athletic	2024–25	Primera Federación	26	5	—		—		—		26	5
Bilbao Athletic	Total		55	12	—		—		—		55	12
Athletic Bilbao	2023–24	La Liga	1	0	—		—		—		1	0
Athletic Bilbao	2024–25	La Liga	1	0	—		1 (Note: Appearances in UEFA Europa League)	0	—		2	0
Athletic Bilbao	Total		2	0	—		1	0	—		3	0
Career total			57	7	0	0	1	0	0	0	58	12

== Honours ==
Bilbao Athletic

- Segunda Federación (Group 2): 2023–24
