= CD Eldense =

Spanish football team

Eldense
- Full name: Club Deportivo Eldense, S.A.D.
- Nicknames: Deportivo; Azulgranas
- Founded: 17 September 1921; 105 years ago
- Stadium: Estadio Municipal Nuevo Pepico Amat
- Capacity: 5,776
- Owner: Lionel Messi
- President: Pablo García Montañés
- Head coach: Javi Calleja
- League: Segunda División
- 2025–26: Primera Federación – Group 2, 1st of 20 (promoted)
- Website: cdeldense.es
Home colours	Away colours	Third colours

Club Deportivo Eldense, S.A.D. is a Spanish football team based in Elda, in the autonomous community of Valencia. Founded in 1921, the club plays in the Segunda División, and holds home matches at Estadio Municipal Nuevo Pepico Amat, which has a capacity of 4,036 spectators.

Lionel Messi subsequently acquired a 100% stake in the club from Colombian investment group TH Soluciones Group S.A.S.(Grupo TH) in September 2026.

== History ==
One of the oldest clubs in the Valencian Community, Eldense enrolled in the Valencian Football Federation in 1924, and started competing in Tercera División 19 years later. It first appeared in Segunda División in the 1956–57 season, narrowly avoiding relegation after finishing in 16th position; the first spell in that tier lasted three years, in a total of five at the professional level.

=== Match fixing allegations ===
Chart of CD Eldense league performance 1929–present

On 4 April 2017, Eldense coach Filippo Vito di Pierro and general manager Nobile Capuani were arrested by Spanish authorities on charges of corruption. The detentions occurred after club president David Aguilar made complaints of match fixing following a 0–12 loss to Barcelona B, whilst Eldense player Cheikh Saad said that he had seen Aguilar arguing with di Pierro at half-time of the match, calling the latter a "scoundrel"; subsequently, the former asked La Liga president Javier Tebas to investigate those allegations.

Eldense temporarily suspended all sporting activities, also ending its contract with the Italian investment group represented by Capuani. They also released 12 players, with five people being arrested in connection with the events.

=== Three consecutive promotions ===
Eldense spent four years in Tercera División and were promoted to the new fourth level Segunda División RFEF in 2020–21 season due to restructuring of the Spanish football league system. On 28 May 2022, Eldense secured a second consecutive promotion to the new third level Primera Federación after beating Sestao River in the last playoff match. On 25 June 2023, Eldense secured promotion to Segunda División after a draw against Real Madrid Castilla. The play-off finished 4–4 on aggregate meaning Eldense went up due to after having a higher regular season finish. Eldense returned to the second tier after a 59-year absence and achieved three consecutive promotions. After two seasons stay in second division, Eldense was relegated back third division in 2024–25 season, but the club achieved promotion back to second division in 2025–26 season, following a 2–1 win against Atlético Madrileño on 17 May 2026.

=== Ownership ===
In September 2026, Argentine footballer Lionel Messi reached a agreement to acquire 100% of the shares of CD Eldense, The club confirmed the agreement on 9 September 2026, stating that the deal was subject to the completion of due diligence, final legal and contractual procedures, and the mandatory authorization of Spain's Consejo Superior de Deportes (High Council for Sports). The shares was previously held by TH Soluciones Group, a Colombian investment group led by Juan Carlos Trujillo, which took control of the club from previous owner Pascual Pérez in October 2025.

== Season to season ==
Season	Tier	Division	Place	Copa del Rey
1928–29	5	2ª Reg.	1st	
1929–30	4	1ª Reg.	4th	
1930–31	5	2ª Reg.	2nd	
1931–32	5	2ª Reg.	4th	
1932–33	5	2ª Reg.	1st	
1933–34	5	2ª Reg.		
1934–35	5	2ª Reg.		
1935–36	5	2ª Reg.	1st	
1939–40	5	1ª Reg. B	2nd	
1940–41	4	1ª Reg.	5th	
1941–42	3	1ª Reg.	1st	
1942–43	3	1ª Reg.	1st	
1943–44	3	3ª	2nd	Third round
1944–45	3	3ª	6th	
1945–46	3	3ª	7th	
1946–47	3	3ª	6th	
1947–48	3	3ª	5th	Second round
1948–49	3	3ª	10th	First round
1949–50	3	3ª	15th	
1950–51	3	3ª	15th	

Season	Tier	Division	Place	Copa del Rey
1951–52	DNP			
1952–53	DNP			
1953–54	3	3ª	8th	
1954–55	3	3ª	2nd	
1955–56	3	3ª	1st	
1956–57	2	2ª	16th	
1957–58	2	2ª	8th	
1958–59	2	2ª	16th	Round of 32
1959–60	3	3ª	7th	
1960–61	3	3ª	4th	
1961–62	3	3ª	1st	
1962–63	2	2ª	7th	Round of 32
1963–64	2	2ª	16th	Round of 32
1964–65	3	3ª	4th	
1965–66	3	3ª	1st	
1966–67	3	3ª	1st	
1967–68	3	3ª	2nd	
1968–69	3	3ª	6th	
1969–70	3	3ª	9th	Fifth round
1970–71	4	1ª Reg.	1st	

Season	Tier	Division	Place	Copa del Rey
1971–72	3	3ª	10th	First round
1972–73	3	3ª	14th	
1973–74	3	3ª	7th	Second round
1974–75	3	3ª	4th	Second round
1975–76	3	3ª	11th	First round
1976–77	3	3ª	4th	Third round
1977–78	3	2ª B	19th	Third round
1978–79	4	3ª	1st	First round
1979–80	3	2ª B	9th	First round
1980–81	3	2ª B	20th	First round
1981–82	4	3ª	4th	
1982–83	4	3ª	1st	Third round
1983–84	4	3ª	1st	First round
1984–85	4	3ª	1st	First round
1985–86	4	3ª	1st	First round
1986–87	4	3ª	2nd	Round of 16
1987–88	3	2ª B	13th	Round of 32
1988–89	3	2ª B	5th	Second round
1989–90	3	2ª B	16th	
1990–91	3	2ª B	18th	First round

Season	Tier	Division	Place	Copa del Rey
1991–92	4	3ª	1st	
1992–93	4	3ª	11th	First round
1993–94	4	3ª	4th	
1994–95	4	3ª	9th	
1995–96	4	3ª	9th	
1996–97	4	3ª	8th	
1997–98	4	3ª	1st	
1998–99	4	3ª	10th	
1999–2000	4	3ª	5th	
2000–01	4	3ª	9th	
2001–02	4	3ª	5th	
2002–03	4	3ª	11th	
2003–04	4	3ª	8th	
2004–05	4	3ª	3rd	
2005–06	4	3ª	3rd	
2006–07	3	2ª B	18th	First round
2007–08	4	3ª	5th	
2008–09	4	3ª	6th	
2009–10	4	3ª	17th	
2010–11	4	3ª	14th	

Season	Tier	Division	Place	Copa del Rey
2011–12	4	3ª	14th	
2012–13	4	3ª	10th	
2013–14	4	3ª	1st	
2014–15	3	2ª B	16th	Second round
2015–16	3	2ª B	10th	
2016–17	3	2ª B	20th	
2017–18	4	3ª	5th	
2018–19	4	3ª	9th	
2019–20	4	3ª	6th	
2020–21	4	3ª	1st	
2021–22	4	2ª RFEF	4th	First round
2022–23	3	1ª Fed.	2nd	Round of 32
2023–24	2	2ª	16th	Second round
2024–25	2	2ª	19th	Round of 32
2025–26	3	1ª Fed.	1st	Round of 32
2026–27	2	2ª		TBD

- 8 seasons in Segunda División
- 2 seasons in Primera Federación
- 11 seasons in Segunda División B
- 1 season in Segunda División RFEF
- 59 seasons in Tercera División

== Honours ==
- Tercera División
  - Champions (12): 1955–56, 1961–62, 1965–66, 1966–67, 1978–79, 1982–83, 1983–84, 1984–85, 1985–86, 1991–92, 1997–98, 2013–14

== Current squad ==
As of 7 September 2026

Note: Flags indicate national team as defined under FIFA eligibility rules; some limited exceptions apply. Players may hold more than one non-FIFA nationality.

No.	Pos.	Nation	Player
1	GK	ESP	Ramon Vila (on loan from Córdoba)
2	DF	ESP	Iker Recio
3	DF	ESP	Juan Larios
4	DF	NED	Floris Smand
5	DF	ESP	Álex Serra
6	MF	ESP	Borja Calvo
7	FW	ESP	Jorge Rastrojo
8	MF	ESP	Marcos Bustillo
9	FW	ESP	Mariano Carmona (on loan from Córdoba)
10	FW	ESP	Fidel Chaves
11	FW	ESP	Manu Nieto
12	MF	ESP	Roberto López
13	GK	ESP	Juan Palomares
14	MF	CAN	Justin Smith

No.	Pos.	Nation	Player
15	MF	ESP	Carlos Guirao (on loan from Leganés)
16	FW	ESP	Pau Cabanes
17	DF	ESP	Jesús Clemente
18	MF	ESP	Guille Macho
19	FW	ESP	Alejandro Ibarrondo
20	FW	ESP	Waldo Rubio
21	DF	ESP	David Ruiz
22	DF	GER	Julien Yanda (on loan from Bayern Munich)
23	MF	ESP	Jordi Martín
24	FW	ESP	Javi Martínez
29	FW	POR	Dinis Rodrigues (on loan from Napoli)
33	FW	ESP	Aingeru Olabarrieta (on loan from Athletic Bilbao)
34	DF	ESP	Javier Olaizola (on loan from Mallorca)

=== Youth players ===
Note: Flags indicate national team as defined under FIFA eligibility rules; some limited exceptions apply. Players may hold more than one non-FIFA nationality.

No.	Pos.	Nation	Player
26	FW	ESP	Iker Carbonell
27	MF	ESP	Cristian Amarillo
30	MF	ESP	David Rodríguez

No.	Pos.	Nation	Player
31	DF	ESP	Antonio David
36	GK	ESP	David Bernabéu

=== Out on loan ===
Note: Flags indicate national team as defined under FIFA eligibility rules; some limited exceptions apply. Players may hold more than one non-FIFA nationality.

No.	Pos.	Nation	Player
—	DF	COL	Óscar Vega (at Móstoles URJC until 30 June 2027)
—	MF	MLT	Boston Billups (at Cartagena until 30 June 2027)

=== Current technical staff ===
Position	Staff
Manager	(Spain) Claudio Barragán
Assistant manager	(Spain) Josep Ferrando
Fitness coach	(Spain) Manolo Sempere
Goalkeeper coach	(Spain) Juan Canales
Technical assistant	(Spain) Sergio Aracil
Technical analyst	(Spain) Manu Aguilera
Chief of medical services	(Spain) David Fernández
Nutritionist	(Spain) Miquel Pérez
Physiotherapist	(Spain) Marcos Martínez (Spain) Juan Carlos Verdú
Assistant fitness coach	(Spain) Joan Yagüe
Rehab fitness coach	(Spain) Alejandro Maseres
Match delegate / Team manager	(Spain) Iván Obrador
Kit man	(Spain) Juan Amorós (Spain) Kevin Galindo

Last updated: 11 August 2026
Source: CD Eldense (in Spanish)

== Famous players ==
Note: this list includes players that have played at least 100 league games and/or have reached international status.

(Argentina) Roberto Orellana
- (Spain) Francisco Alba
- (Spain) Boni Amat
- (Spain) Pepico Amat
- (Spain) José Castroverde
- (Spain) Coca
- (Spain) Foncho
- (Spain) Francisco Grande
- (Spain) Gregorio López Miró
- (Spain) Peque
- (Spain) José Luis Ramírez
- (Spain) Manuel Santiago
- (Spain) Alfonso Silos
- (Spain) Juan Villena
- (Philippines) Diego Bardanca
- (Romania) Florin Andone

== Reserve team ==
Eldense's reserve team, CD Eldense B, was founded in 1994 and plays in the Tercera Federación – Group 6, which corresponds to the sixth tier. A second reserve team named CD Eldense C also existed during the 2002–03 season, playing in Segunda Regional. The C-side also returned to an active status in 2021, and currently plays in Segona FFCV – Group 8.
