= Marc Domènech (footballer, born 2006) =

Spanish footballer

Personal information
- Full name: Marc Domènech González
- Date of birth: 1 December 2006 (age 19)
- Place of birth: Llucmajor, Spain
- Height: 1.82 m (6 ft 0 in)
- Position: Forward

Team information
- Current team: Alético Madrid B (on loan from Mallorca)

Youth career
- Mallorca
- 2021–2024: San Francisco

Senior career*
Years	Team	Apps	(Gls)
2024–2025	Mallorca B	26	(9)
2024–	Mallorca	17	(0)
2026	→ Ceuta (loan)	8	(1)
2026–	→ Alético Madrid B (loan)	0	(0)
- * Club domestic league appearances and goals as of 9 June 2026

Marc Domènech González (born 1 December 2006) is a Spanish professional footballer who plays as a forward for Atlético Madrileño, on loan from RCD Mallorca.

== Career ==
Born in Llucmajor, Mallorca, Balearic Islands, Domènech played for the youth sides of RCD Mallorca before moving to affiliate club CD San Francisco. During the 2023–24 season, he was the top scorer of the Group 3 of División de Honor Juvenil with 21 goals.

In July 2024, Domènech renewed his contract with the Bermellones until 2029, after the club rejected an offer from FC Barcelona of around € 300,000. Initially promoted to the reserves, he was included in the first team squad for the pre-season, scoring in their first friendly against Crewe Alexandra.

Domènech made his official – and La Liga – debut with Mallorca on 27 August 2024, coming on as a late substitute for Sergi Darder in a 0–0 home draw against Sevilla FC. He scored his first senior goal on 27 October, netting the B's only in a 3–1 Segunda Federación away loss to Lleida CF.

On 2 January 2026, after being a permanent member of the first team during the first half of the season, Domènech was loaned to Segunda División side AD Ceuta FC until June. He scored his first professional goal on 20 February, netting the opener in a 2–1 home win over Granada CF.

On 22 August 2026, Domènech moved to Atlético Madrid's reserves in Primera Federación on a one-year loan deal.

== Career statistics ==
As of match played 29 October 2025

Appearances and goals by club, season and competition
Club	Season	League			Cup		Europe		Other		Total	
Club	Season	Division	Apps	Goals	Apps	Goals	Apps	Goals	Apps	Goals	Apps	Goals
Mallorca B	2024–25	Segunda Federación	26	9	—		—		—		26	9
Mallorca	2024–25	La Liga	10	0	0	0	—		—		10	0
Mallorca	2025–26	La Liga	7	0	1	0	—		—		8	0
Mallorca	Total		17	0	1	0	—		0	0	18	0
Career total			43	9	1	0	0	0	0	0	44	9
