= Théo Le Normand =

French footballer (born 2000)

Personal information
- Date of birth: 8 August 2000 (age 26)
- Place of birth: Rennes, France
- Height: 1.80 m (5 ft 11 in)
- Position: Midfielder

Team information
- Current team: Andorra
- Number: 24

Youth career
- 2013–2019: Guingamp

Senior career*
Years	Team	Apps	(Gls)
2019–2024	Guingamp II	71	(5)
2021–2024	Guingamp	6	(0)
2022–2023	→ Avranches (loan)	9	(1)
2022–2023	→ Avranches II (loan)	2	(1)
2024–	Andorra	31	(4)
2024–2025	→ Teruel (loan)	33	(8)
- * Club domestic league appearances and goals as of 9 June 2026

Théo Le Normand (born 8 August 2000) is a French professional footballer who plays as a midfielder for Segunda División club FC Andorra.

== Career ==
Le Normand is a youth product of the academy of Guingamp since 2013, and was promoted to their reserves in 2019. On 4 June 2021, he signed his first professional contract with the club. He made his professional debut with the senior Guingamp side in a 3–0 Ligue 2 loss to Amiens on 22 January 2022.

On 9 August 2024, Le Normand signed a two-year contract with Andorra in the Spanish third-tier Primera Federación and was immediately loaned for the 2024–25 season to Teruel in the fourth tier.

== Personal life ==
Le Normand's older brother, Robin, is a professional footballer for Atlético Madrid, who made his debut in La Liga playing for Real Sociedad. He also had a sister who died aged five.
