= Gael Alonso =

Spanish footballer

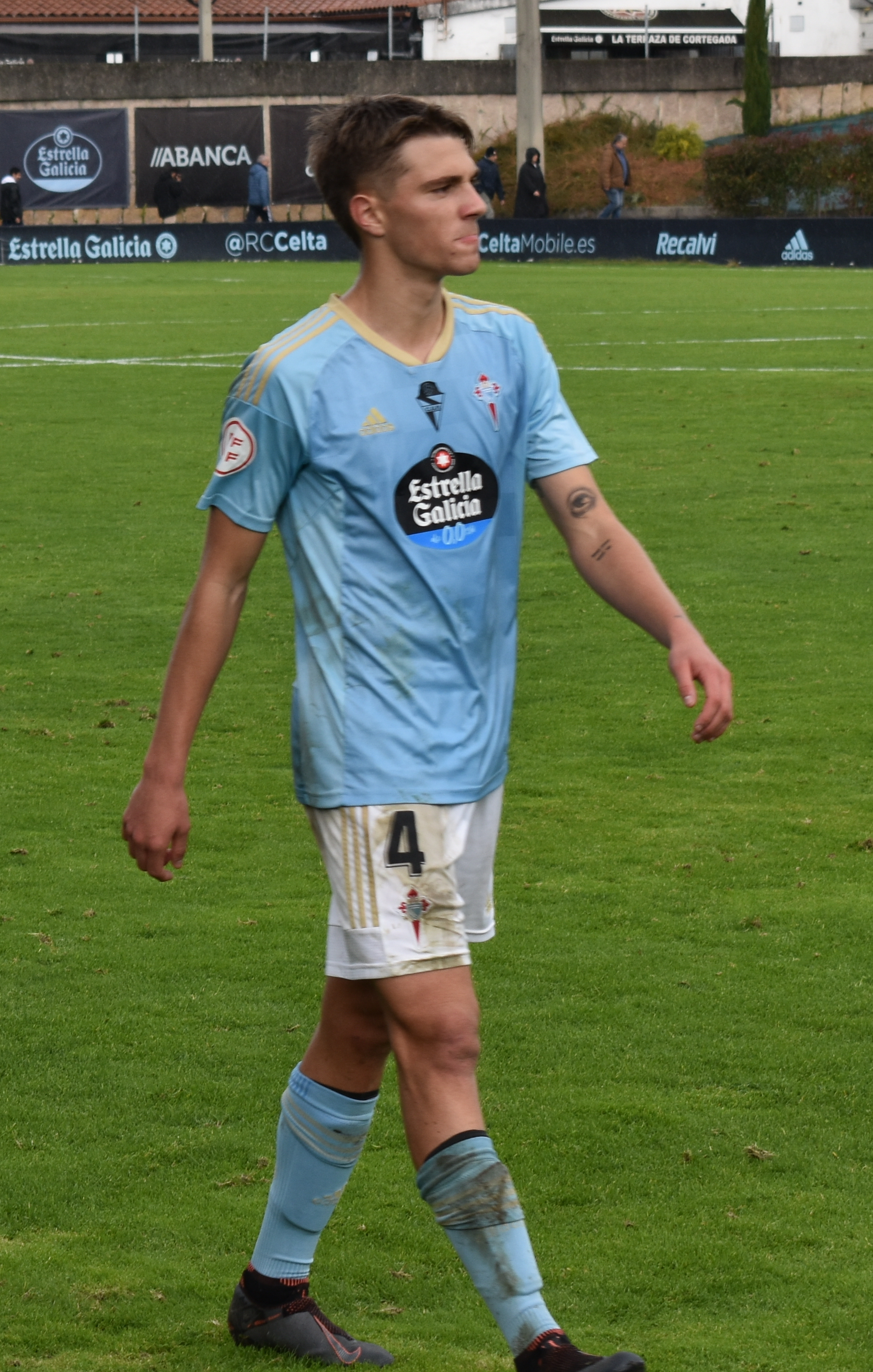
- Alonso with Celta C in 2022

Personal information
- Full name: Gael Alonso Moreno
- Date of birth: 22 July 2002 (age 24)
- Place of birth: Vigo, Spain
- Height: 1.82 m (6 ft 0 in)
- Position: Centre-back

Team information
- Current team: Andorra
- Number: 4

Youth career
- 2012–2021: Celta

Senior career*
| Years | Team | Apps | (Gls) |
| 2021–2023 | Celta C | 46 | (4) |
| 2021–2025 | Celta B | 53 | (5) |
| 2025– | Andorra | 38 | (2) |
- * Club domestic league appearances and goals as of 9 June 2026

Gael Alonso Moreno (born 22 July 2002) is a Spanish professional footballer who plays as a centre-back for Segunda División club FC Andorra.

== Career ==
Born in Vigo, Galicia, Alonso joined RC Celta de Vigo's youth sides in 2012, aged ten. After progressing through the youth sides, he made his senior debut on 25 September 2021, coming on as a late substitute for Álex Martín with the reserves in a 1–0 Primera División RFEF away loss to CD Calahorra.

After making his senior debut with the B's, Alonso featured with farm team Gran Peña FC in most of the 2021–22 season, achieving promotion from the Preferente de Galicia. He returned to the B-team in late 2022, and became a permanent member of the side ahead of the 2023–24 campaign before suffering a fracture of the scaphoid bone in September 2023, which sidelined him for nearly seven months.

On 10 July 2025, Alonso departed Celta after more than a decade after the club, as his contract expired. Hours later, he was announced at Segunda División side FC Andorra on a three-year deal.

Alonso made his professional debut on 17 August 2025, starting in a 1–1 away draw against UD Las Palmas. He scored his first professional goal six days later, netting his side's third in a 3–1 away win over Real Zaragoza.
