= Antal Yaakobishvili =

Hungarian footballer (born 2004)

Personal information
- Full name: Antal Yaakobishvili
- Date of birth: 12 July 2004 (age 22)
- Place of birth: Budapest, Hungary
- Height: 1.93 m (6 ft 4 in)
- Position: Centre-back

Team information
- Current team: Atlético Madrid B (on loan from Girona)

Youth career
- Baráti Bőrlabda
- 2015–2017: MTK Budapest
- 2017–2021: Atlètic Sant Just
- 2021–2023: Girona

Senior career*
Years	Team	Apps	(Gls)
2022–2025	Girona B	67	(3)
2024–	Girona	1	(0)
2025	→ Andorra (loan)	3	(0)
2026	→ Tenerife (loan)	7	(0)
2026–	→ Atlético Madrid B (loan)	0	(0)

International career^{‡}
2021	Hungary U18	1	(0)
2023	Hungary U19	3	(0)
2023–	Hungary U21	11	(0)
- * Club domestic league appearances and goals as of 9 June 2026 ‡ National team caps and goals as of 5 June 2025

Antal Yaakobishvili (born 12 July 2004) is a Hungarian professional footballer who plays as a centre-back for Spanish club Atlético Madrileño, on loan from Girona FC.

== Early life ==
Yaakobishvili was born in Budapest, Hungary to Georgian Jewish father; his father was born in Georgia and spent two years in Israel, enabling Israeli citizenship; his mother is Hungarian. His younger brother Áron is also a footballer, and plays as a goalkeeper for the youth sides of FC Barcelona.

== Club career ==
Yaakobishvili moved to Barcelona in 2017 after his mother received a job offer in the city, and joined the youth sides of Atlètic Sant Just FC along with his younger brother. In 2021, he was signed by Girona FC, joining their Juvenil squads.

Yaakobishvili made his senior debut with Girona's reserves on 11 December 2022, starting in a 4–1 Tercera Federación home routing of CE L'Hospitalet. He scored his first senior goal the following 12 February, netting the B's second in a 2–0 away win over UE Tona.

Yaakobishvili made his first team debut on 17 January 2024, coming on as a half-time substitute for Juanpe in a 3–1 home win over Rayo Vallecano, for the season's Copa del Rey. On 21 January 2024, he debuted in La Liga in a 5–1 victory over Sevilla FC on the 25 game week of the 2023–24 La Liga season.

On 29 January 2025, Yaakobishvili played his first match in the UEFA Champions League in a 2–1 defeat from Arsenal F.C. on the last match day of the 2024–25 UEFA Champions League league phase. After the match, Michel, the manager of Girona, said that Yaakobishvili is ready for playing in the first team.

On 15 August 2025, Yaakobishvili was loaned to Segunda División side FC Andorra for one year; he became the third loanee of Girona to the club, and also joined his brother Áron in the squad. The following 22 January, after being rarely used, he moved to Primera Federación side CD Tenerife on loan until June.

On 27 August 2026, Yaakobishvili was loaned to Atlético Madrileño also in division three, for one year.

== International career ==
Yaakobishvili has represented Hungary at under-18, under-19 and under-21 levels. In June 2023, it was reported by Israeli sports journalism outlet Sport 5 that Yaakobishvili and his brother were attempting to gain Israeli citizenship to represent the nation at the international level. However, their agent Attila Georgi denied these rumours, stating that the brothers were Hungarian and that they wanted to represent Hungary at international level.

On 27 August 2024, Yaakobishvili was called up to the Hungary national team by manager Marco Rossi for a 2024–25 UEFA Nations League match against Germany.

== Career statistics ==
=== Club ===
As of match played 8 September 2025

Appearances and goals by club, season and competition
Club	Season	League			Copa del Rey		Europe		Other		Total	
Club	Season	Division	Apps	Goals	Apps	Goals	Apps	Goals	Apps	Goals	Apps	Goals
Girona B	2022–23	Tercera Federación	14	1	—		—		—		14	1
Girona B	2023–24	Tercera Federación	22	0	—		—		—		22	0
Girona B	2024–25	Tercera Federación	31	2	—		—		—		31	2
Girona B	Total		67	3	—		—		—		67	3
Girona	2023–24	La Liga	1	0	2	0	—		—		3	0
Girona	2024–25	La Liga	0	0	1	0	1 (Note: Appearance in UEFA Champions League)	0	1 (Note: Appearance in Copa Catalunya)	0	3	0
Girona	Total		1	0	3	0	1	0	1	0	6	0
Andorra (loan)	2025–26	Segunda División	2	0	0	0	—		—		2	0
Career total			70	3	3	0	1	0	1	0	75	3
