= Franck Fomeyem =

Cameroonian footballer

Personal information
- Full name: Franck Ferry Fomeyem Sob
- Date of birth: 17 October 1999 (age 27)
- Place of birth: Yaoundé, Cameroon
- Height: 1.81 m (5 ft 11 in)
- Position: Centre-back

Team information
- Current team: Córdoba
- Number: 12

Youth career
- APEJES Academy

Senior career*
Years	Team	Apps	(Gls)
2017–2018	APEJES Academy		
2018–2019	Alcoyano	15	(0)
2019–2020	Intercity	23	(0)
2020–2023	SS Reyes	56	(0)
2023–2025	Antequera	70	(5)
2025–	Córdoba	14	(0)

International career
2018	Cameroon U20	4	(0)
- * Club domestic league appearances and goals as of 26 November 2025

Franck Ferry Fomeyem Sob (born 17 October 1999) is a Cameroonian professional footballer who plays as a centre-back for Spanish club Córdoba CF.

== Club career ==
Born in Yaoundé, Fomeyem began his career with APEJES Academy and went on to play with the side in the 2017 CAF Confederation Cup. In November 2018, he moved to Spain and signed for Segunda División B side CD Alcoyano.

On 8 September 2019, after being sparingly used, Fomeyem moved to CF Intercity in Tercera División. On 6 October of the following year, after being regularly used, he returned to the third division with UD San Sebastián de los Reyes.

On 22 July 2023, after suffering relegation with Sanse, Fomeyem agreed to a contract with fellow Primera Federación side Antequera CF. On 21 January 2025, he agreed to a pre-contract with Córdoba CF; the club also tried to sign him in the winter transfer window, but Antequera rejected the offers.

On 19 June 2025, Córdoba officially announced the signing of Fomeyem on a two-year deal.

== International career ==
Fomeyem played for the Cameroon national under-20 team in the 2019 U-20 Africa Cup of Nations qualification.
