= Yeray Cabanzón =

Spanish footballer

Personal information
- Full name: Yeray Cabanzón de Arriba
- Date of birth: 14 May 2003 (age 23)
- Place of birth: Isla, Spain
- Height: 1.70 m (5 ft 7 in)
- Position: Winger

Team information
- Current team: Valladolid

Youth career
- 2013–2021: Racing Santander
- 2018–2021: Getafe

Senior career*
| Years | Team | Apps | (Gls) |
| 2021–2023 | Racing B | 43 | (12) |
| 2021–2026 | Racing Santander | 39 | (2) |
| 2024–2025 | → Ponferradina (loan) | 51 | (5) |
| 2026 | → Andorra (loan) | 17 | (2) |
| 2026– | Valladolid | 0 | (0) |
- * Club domestic league appearances and goals as of 9 June 2026

Yeray Cabanzón de Arriba (born 14 May 2003), sometimes known as just Yeray, is a Spanish footballer who plays as a right winger for Real Valladolid.

== Club career ==
Born in Isla, Cantabria, Cabanzón joined Racing de Santander's youth setup in 2013, aged ten. He made his senior debut with the reserves on 5 September 2021, coming on as a half-time substitute in a 2–0 Segunda División RFEF home loss against Real Sociedad C.

Cabanzón made his first team debut on 6 October 2021, in a 2–1 home win over Arenas Club de Getxo for the year's Copa Federación de España. He featured in nine league matches for the main squad during the season, as Racing achieved promotion to Segunda División; on 19 July 2022, he also renewed his contract for the following two years.

Cabanzón made his professional debut on 8 January 2023, starting in a 1–1 away draw against UD Las Palmas in the second division. He scored his first professional goal on 5 February, netting the equalizer in an away draw against SD Ponferradina for the same scoreline.

On 31 January 2024, Cabanzón was loaned to Ponfe for the remainder of the 2023–24 Primera Federación season. On 20 August, he extended his contract with Racing until 2027, and returned to Ponferradina on a one-year loan deal.

Back to Racing in July 2025, Cabanzón again featured sparingly before joining fellow second division side FC Andorra on a six-month loan deal on 9 January 2026. On 24 July, he signed a three-year contract with Real Valladolid of the same category.
