= Rus, Spain =

Rus
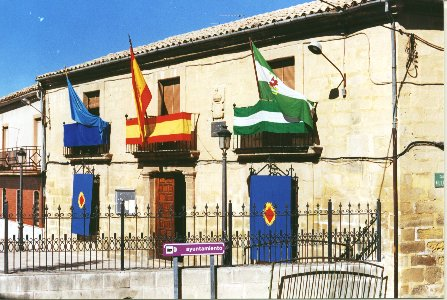
- El Ayuntamiento, a historic stone building in Rus.

- Flag Coat of arms

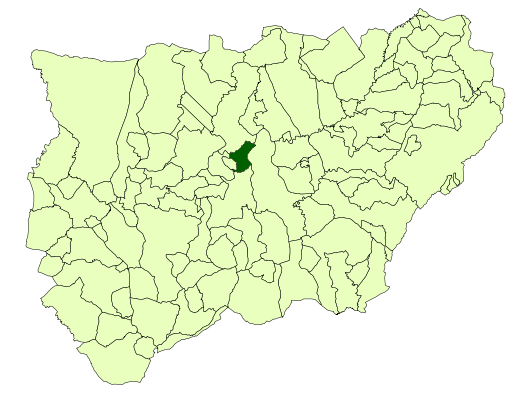

- Location in the Province of Jaén Rus, Spain (Andalusia) Rus, Spain (Spain)
- Coordinates: 38°03′N 3°27′W
- Country: Spain
- Autonomous community: Andalusia
- Province: Jaén

Area
  - Total: 47.3 km^{2} (18.3 sq mi)
- Elevation: 590 m (1,940 ft)

Population (2025-01-01)
  - Total: 3,386
  - Density: 71.6/km^{2} (185/sq mi)
- Time zone: UTC+1 (CET)
  - Summer (DST): UTC+2 (CEST)
- Website: www.rus.es

Rus is a village and municipality in the province of Jaén, Andalusia, in southern Spain.

== See also ==
- List of municipalities in Jaén
