= Estadi de la FAF =

Home stadium of the Andorran National Football Team

- Interactive map of Estadi de la FAF
- Full name: L'Estadi de la FAF
- Location: Encamp, Andorra
- Coordinates: 42.5335°N 1.5759°E
- Owner: Federació Andorrana de Futbol
- Operator: Federació Andorrana de Futbol
- Capacity: 5,108
- Surface: Heated hybrid turf
- Record attendance: 4,051; FC Andorra vs Ponferradina (15 June 2025)

Construction
- Groundbreaking: December 2022
- Built: December 2022 – May 2025
- Opened: 25 May 2025
- Cost: 15 million euro

Tenants
- Andorra national football team (2025–present); FC Andorra (2025–present)

The Estadi de la FAF, also referred to as Nou Estadi a Encamp, is a stadium located in Encamp. It is the national stadium of the Andorra national football team, Inter Club d'Escaldes, and FC Andorra, replacing the Estadi Nacional, and is used for association football.

Opened in 2025, the stadium has a capacity of 5,108.

== History ==
The stadium was built on a former camping site, with construction starting in December 2022 and finished in 2025, after several delays, with an estimated cost of 15 million euro.

The first official match to be played at stadium was the 2025 Copa Constitució Final on 25 May 2025, where Inter Club d'Escaldes defeated rivals Atlètic Club d'Escaldes 1–0; a crowd of 684 witnessed Raul Feher scoring the first goal at the new stadium. Five days later, on 30 May, the first international match took place at the new stadium, when Andorra women's team were narrowly defeated by Georgia in a UEFA Women's Nations League fixture.

The stadium also hosted FC Andorra for their Primera Federación promotion play-off matches against Ibiza and Ponferradina in June 2025 as their usual home venue, the Estadi Nacional, was unavailable due to the hosting of the 2025 Games of the Small States of Europe event.

In July 2025, FC Andorra agreed terms with the Andorran Football Federation for using the stadium during until May 2026. In addition, the stadium became the home of Andorran clubs for UEFA Champions League and UEFA Conference League matches.

== Attendances to official games ==
=== Andorra women's national football team ===
Season	Total	High	Low	Average
2025 Nations League (Note: Two matches played at Estadi de la FAF.)	983	513	470	492

=== Andorra national football team ===
Season	Total	High	Low	Average
2026–27 Nations League (Note: Estadi de la FAF hosted the first match of the tournament.)	1615	905	710	807
