= CF Amposta =

Spanish association football club

Amposta
- logo
- Full name: Club de Futbol Amposta
- Founded: 1915; 111 years ago
- Ground: Estadi Municipal, Amposta, Catalonia
- Capacity: 3,000
- Chairman: Jordi Perez Valmaña
- Manager: Jordi Fabregat
- League: Segona Catalana – Group 6
- 2024–25: Segona Catalana – Group 6, 4th of 16
Home colours	Away colours

Club de Futbol Amposta is a Spanish football team based in Amposta, in the autonomous community of Catalonia. Founded in 1915, it competes in the Segona Catalana – Group 6, holding home games at Estadi Municipal de Amposta, which has a capacity of 3,000 spectators.

== Season to season ==
Season	Tier	Division	Place	Copa del Rey
1939–40	6	2ª Reg. P.	5th	
1940–41	6	2ª Reg. P.	3rd	
1941–42	5	2ª Reg. P.	3rd	
1942–43	5	2ª Reg.	3rd	
1943–44	6	2ª Reg.	2nd	
1944–45	6	2ª Reg. P.	1st	
1945–46	5	1ª Reg. B	4th	
1946–47	5	2ª Reg.	3rd	
1947–48	5	1ª Reg. B	1st	
1948–49	5	1ª Reg. B	2nd	
1949–50	5	1ª Reg. B	1st	
1950–51	4	1ª Reg. A	3rd	
1951–52	4	1ª Reg. A	4th	
1952–53	4	1ª Reg. A	4th	
1953–54	4	1ª Reg.	1st	
1954–55	3	3ª	4th	
1955–56	3	3ª	4th	
1956–57	3	3ª	16th	
1957–58	3	3ª	17th	
1958–59	3	3ª	2nd	

Season	Tier	Division	Place	Copa del Rey
1959–60	3	3ª	5th	
1960–61	3	3ª	14th	
1961–62	4	1ª Reg.	4th	
1962–63	4	1ª Reg.	9th	
1963–64	4	1ª Reg.	9th	
1964–65	4	1ª Reg.	9th	
1965–66	4	1ª Reg.	9th	
1966–67	4	1ª Reg.	18th	
1967–68	5	2ª Reg.	3rd	
1968–69	5	1ª Reg.	3rd	
1969–70	5	1ª Reg.	1st	
1970–71	4	Reg. Pref.	11th	
1971–72	4	Reg. Pref.	15th	
1972–73	5	1ª Reg.	8th	
1973–74	5	1ª Reg.	4th	
1974–75	5	1ª Reg.	12th	
1975–76	5	1ª Reg.	3rd	
1976–77	5	1ª Reg.	6th	
1977–78	5	Reg. Pref.	20th	
1978–79	6	1ª Reg.	7th	

Season	Tier	Division	Place	Copa del Rey
1979–80	6	1ª Reg.	3rd	
1980–81	6	1ª Reg.	5th	
1981–82	6	1ª Reg.	7th	
1982–83	6	1ª Reg.	6th	
1983–84	6	1ª Reg.	5th	
1984–85	5	Reg. Pref.	16th	
1985–86	6	1ª Reg.	6th	
1986–87	6	1ª Reg.	2nd	
1987–88	5	Reg. Pref.	13th	
1988–89	5	Reg. Pref.	16th	
1989–90	6	1ª Reg.	2nd	
1990–91	6	1ª Reg.	3rd	
1991–92	6	Pref. Terr.	14th	
1992–93	6	Pref. Terr.	16th	
1993–94	7	1ª Terr.	5th	
1994–95	7	1ª Terr.	10th	
1995–96	7	1ª Terr.	3rd	
1996–97	7	1ª Terr.	4th	
1997–98	7	1ª Terr.	10th	
1998–99	7	1ª Terr.	7th	

Season	Tier	Division	Place	Copa del Rey
1999–2000	7	1ª Terr.	10th	
2000–01	7	1ª Terr.	5th	
2001–02	7	1ª Terr.	5th	
2002–03	7	1ª Terr.	4th	
2003–04	7	1ª Terr.	1st	
2004–05	6	Pref. Terr.	4th	
2005–06	6	Pref. Terr.	2nd	
2006–07	5	1ª Cat.	7th	
2007–08	5	1ª Cat.	3rd	
2008–09	4	3ª	10th	
2009–10	4	3ª	10th	
2010–11	4	3ª	14th	
2011–12	4	3ª	19th	
2012–13	5	1ª Cat.	7th	
2013–14	5	1ª Cat.	12th	
2014–15	5	1ª Cat.	8th	
2015–16	5	1ª Cat.	16th	
2016–17	6	2ª Cat.	4th	
2017–18	6	2ª Cat.	2nd	
2018–19	6	2ª Cat.	8th	

Season	Tier	Division	Place	Copa del Rey
2019–20	6	2ª Cat.	8th	
2020–21	6	2ª Cat.	9th	
2021–22	7	2ª Cat.	4th	
2022–23	8	3ª Cat.	2nd	
2023–24	9	3ª Cat.	1st	
2024–25	8	2ª Cat.	4th	
2025–26	8	2ª Cat.		

- 11 seasons in Tercera División
