= Dani Villahermosa =

Spanish footballer (born 2001)

Personal information
- Full name: Daniel Villahermosa Martínez
- Date of birth: 2 January 2001 (age 25)
- Place of birth: Barcelona, Spain
- Height: 1.72 m (5 ft 8 in)
- Position: Midfielder

Team information
- Current team: Oviedo

Youth career
- 2009–2019: Espanyol

Senior career*
Years	Team	Apps	(Gls)
2019–2023	Espanyol B	72	(7)
2022–2023	Espanyol	1	(0)
2023–2025	Castellón	44	(2)
2025–2026	Andorra	57	(7)
2026–	Oviedo	0	(0)
- * Club domestic league appearances and goals as of 9 June 2026

Daniel Villahermosa Martínez (born 2 January 2001) is a Spanish professional footballer who plays as a midfielder for Segunda División club Real Oviedo.

== Career ==
Born in Barcelona, Catalonia, Villahermosa was a youth product of his hometown club RCD Espanyol, having joined the club in 2009. He made his senior debut with the reserves in 2019, and signed a professional contract with the club on 26 July 2021.

Villahermosa made his first team – and La Liga – debut on 14 May 2022, coming on as a second-half substitute in a 1–1 draw with Valencia CF. In July 2023, he left the Pericos after 14 years, as his contract was not renewed.

On 19 July 2023, Villahermosa signed with Primera Federación side CD Castellón. He contributed two goals in 35 matches overall, as the club achieved promotion to Segunda División.

On 3 February 2025, Villahermosa terminated his link with the Orelluts, and signed with FC Andorra until the end of the third-tier season, with an option to extend for two more seasons. He also helped the side to a promotion to division two, and scored his first professional goal on 23 August, netting his side's second in a 3–1 away win over Real Zaragoza.

On 25 July 2026, Villahermosa signed a three-year contract with fellow second division side Real Oviedo.
