= Lautaro de León =

Uruguayan footballer (born 2001)

Personal information
- Full name: Lautaro de León Bouzada Billar
- Date of birth: 9 February 2001 (age 25)
- Place of birth: Montevideo, Uruguay
- Height: 1.85 m (6 ft 1 in)
- Position: Forward

Team information
- Current team: Andorra
- Number: 11

Youth career
- 2005–2017: Portonovo
- 2017–2020: Celta

Senior career*
| Years | Team | Apps | (Gls) |
| 2019–2023 | Celta B | 92 | (15) |
| 2020–2024 | Celta | 1 | (0) |
| 2023–2024 | → Cartagena (loan) | 11 | (0) |
| 2024 | → Mirandés (loan) | 13 | (1) |
| 2024– | Andorra | 74 | (20) |
- * Club domestic league appearances and goals as of 9 June 2026

Lautaro de León Bouzada Billar (born 9 February 2001) is a Uruguayan professional footballer who plays as a forward for Segunda División club FC Andorra.

== Club career ==
Born in Montevideo, de León moved to Spain at an early age and joined Portonovo SD's youth setup at the age of four. On 3 July 2017, he moved to RC Celta de Vigo and was initially assigned to the Juvenil B squad.

De León made his senior debut with the reserves on 24 March 2019, coming on as a late substitute for Víctor Pastrana in a 1–3 Segunda División B away loss against Cultural y Deportiva Leonesa. He scored his first goal on 18 September, netting his team's fourth in a 4–2 home win against UD Melilla.

On 14 December 2020, de León made his first team – and La Liga – debut, replacing Nolito late into a 4–0 home routing of Cádiz CF. On 9 February 2023, he renewed his contract until 2027.

On 15 July 2023, de León was loaned to Segunda División side FC Cartagena for the season. On 31 January 2024, he joined CD Mirandés on a loan deal until the end of the season.

On 2 July 2024, de León moved to Primera Federación side FC Andorra on a free transfer. On 21 June 2025, he scored the decisive goal in a 1–0 away victory against Ponferradina in the second leg of the promotion play-offs final, securing his team's promotion to the Segunda División by winning 2–1 on aggregate.

== International career ==
Born in Uruguay, de León can also represent Spain after living for more than ten years in the country.

== Career statistics ==
As of match played 27 May 2023

Appearances and goals by club, season and competition
| Club | Season | League | | | National Cup | | Other | | Total | |
| Club | Season | Division | Apps | Goals | Apps | Goals | Apps | Goals | Apps | Goals |
|---|---|---|---|---|---|---|---|---|---|---|
| Celta B | 2018–19 | Segunda División B | 1 | 0 | — | | — | | 1 | 0 |
| Celta B | 2019–20 | Segunda División B | 15 | 1 | — | | — | | 15 | 1 |
| Celta B | 2020–21 | Segunda División B | 15 | 3 | — | | 7 | 0 | 22 | 3 |
| Celta B | 2021–22 | Primera División RFEF | 26 | 4 | — | | — | | 26 | 4 |
| Celta B | 2022–23 | Primera Federación | 35 | 7 | — | | 0 | 0 | 35 | 7 |
| Celta B | Total | | 92 | 15 | 0 | 0 | 7 | 0 | 99 | 15 |
| Celta | 2020–21 | La Liga | 1 | 0 | 2 | 1 | — | | 3 | 1 |
| Career total | | | 93 | 15 | 2 | 1 | 7 | 0 | 102 | 16 |
