= Jastin García =

Portuguese footballer (born 2004)

Personal information
- Full name: Antonino Jastin López García
- Birth name: Antonino Jastin García López (Note: In this Spanish name, the first or paternal surname is García and the second or maternal family name is López.)
- Date of birth: 15 January 2004 (age 22)
- Place of birth: Lleida, Spain
- Height: 1.80 m (5 ft 11 in)
- Position: Winger

Team information
- Current team: Girona
- Number: 21

Youth career
- 2012–2018: FIF Lleida
- 2018–2019: Lleida Esportiu
- 2019–2023: Girona

Senior career*
Years	Team	Apps	(Gls)
2022–2025	Girona B	33	(3)
2024–	Girona	5	(1)
2025–2026	→ Andorra (loan)	28	(3)

International career^{‡}
2024–	Portugal U20	2	(0)
2024–	Catalonia	1	(0)
- * Club domestic league appearances and goals as of 29 August 2026 ‡ National team caps and goals as of 29 May 2025

Antonino Jastin López García (born 15 January 2004), sometimes known as just Jastin, is a professional footballer who plays mainly as a left winger for Segunda División club Girona FC. Born in Spain, he represents Portugal at international level.

== Club career ==
Born in Lleida, Catalonia, Jastin began his career with hometown side FIF Lleida at the age of four, and joined Lleida Esportiu's youth sides in 2018. In the following year, he moved to the youth categories of Girona FC.

Jastin made his senior debut with the reserves on 18 September 2022, starting in a 2–0 Tercera Federación away loss to CE Europa. On 11 August of the following year, after impressing with the first team in the pre-season, he renewed his contract with the Blanquivermells until 2027.

After struggling with an ankle injury in September 2023, Jastin underwent surgery in October, being sidelined for nearly five months. Fully recovered, he made his first team – and La Liga – debut on 9 March 2024, replacing Iván Martín late into a 2–0 home win over CA Osasuna.

On 8 August 2025, Jastin was loaned to Segunda División side FC Andorra for the season. Upon returning, he was assigned to the main squad now also in the second division.

== International career ==
Jastin was born in Spain to a Cape-Verdean and Portuguese father and Spanish mother, and holds dual Spanish and Portuguese citizenship. In March 2024, Jastin was called up to the Portugal under-20 football team for two friendlies against Czech Republic and Denmark.

== Career statistics ==
As of 29 August 2026

Appearances and goals by club, season and competition
Club	Season	League			Cup		Continental		Other		Total	
Club	Season	Division	Apps	Goals	Apps	Goals	Apps	Goals	Apps	Goals	Apps	Goals
Girona B	2022–23	Tercera Federación	11	0	—		—		—		11	0
Girona B	2023–24	Tercera Federación	5	0	—		—		—		5	0
Girona B	2024–25	Tercera Federación	15	2	—		—		—		15	2
Girona B	Total		31	2	—		—		—		31	2
Girona	2023–24	La Liga	3	0	—		—		—		3	0
Girona	2024–25	La Liga	0	0	1	0	1 (Note: Appearances in UEFA Champions League)	0	1 (Note: Appearances in Copa Catalunya)	0	3	0
Girona	2026–27	Segunda División	2	1	0	0	—		—		2	1
Girona	Total		5	1	1	0	1	0	1	0	8	1
Andorra (loan)	2025–26	Segunda División	28	3	2	1	—		—		30	4
Career total			64	6	3	1	1	0	1	0	69	7
