= 2025 Primera Federación play-offs =

The 2025 Primera Federación play-offs (Playoffs de Ascenso or Promoción de Ascenso) are the final play-offs for promotion from 2024–25 Primera Federación to the 2025–26 Segunda División.

== Format ==
Teams ranked second through fifth in each of the two groups will qualify for the promotion play-off, which will determine the last two promotion spots. The eight qualified teams will be drawn into two fixed brackets, each of which will contain the second and fifth-place finishers from one group and the third and fourth-place finishers from the other. All ties will consist of a two-legged knockout series. In case of draws, an overtime period will be played; if the match is still tied following the overtime, the team which achieved a higher regular season finish will be proclaimed the winner.

Starting with the 2022–23 season, the RFEF recovered the two-legged knockout system, due to the complaints filed against the single knockout system at a neutral venue that had been implemented after COVID-19 and the subsequent reform of the football leagues organized by the RFEF.

=== Bracket ===
Semi–finals (31 May–1 June and 7–8 June)
5B	Antequera	1	1	2
2A	Ponferradina	0	2	2 (seed)
4A	Andorra	2	1	3
3B	Ibiza	0	0	0

Finals (14–15 and 21–22 June)
2A	Ponferradina	1	0	1
4A	Andorra	1	1	2

Semi–finals (31 May–1 June and 7–8 June)
5A	Gimnàstic	1	1	2
2B	Murcia	1	0	1
4B	Mérida	0	1	1
3A	Real Sociedad B	1	0	1 (seed)

Finals (14–15 and 21–22 June)
5A	Gimnàstic	1	2	3
3A	Real Sociedad B	3	1	4

=== First round ===
==== Qualified teams ====
Group	Position	Team
1	2nd	Ponferradina
2	2nd	Murcia

Group	Position	Team
1	3rd	Real Sociedad B
2	3rd	Ibiza

Group	Position	Team
1	4th	Andorra
2	4th	Mérida

Group	Position	Team
1	5th	Gimnàstic
2	5th	Antequera

==== Matches ====
===== Semi–finals =====
Team 1	Agg.	Team 2	1st leg	2nd leg
Antequera	2–2 (s)	Ponferradina	1–0	1–2 (a.e.t.)
Andorra	3–0	Ibiza	2–0	1–0
Gimnàstic	2–1	Murcia	1–1	1–0
Mérida	1–1 (s)	Real Sociedad B	0–1	1–0 (a.e.t.)

First leg

31 May 2025	Gimnàstic	1–1	Murcia	Tarragona
18:30 UTC+2	Fernández 75'	Report	Benito 40'	Stadium: Nou Estadi Costa Daurada; Attendance: 13,897; Referee: Luis Bestard Severa

31 May 2025	Antequera	1–0	Ponferradina	Antequera
20:30 UTC+2	Rubio 51'	Report		Stadium: Estadio El Maulí; Attendance: 3,652; Referee: Manuel García Gómez

1 June 2025	Andorra	2–0	Ibiza	Encamp
17:00 UTC+2	Cerdà 19' de León 42'	Report		Stadium: Estadi de la FAF; Attendance: 3,141; Referee: Jorge Tárraga Lájara

1 June 2025	Mérida	0–1	Real Sociedad B	Mérida
20:00 UTC+2		Report	Mariezkurrena 69'	Stadium: Estadio Romano; Attendance: 6,470; Referee: Manuel Camacho Garrote

Second leg

7 June 2025	Ponferradina	2–1 (a.e.t.) (2–2 agg.)	Antequera	Ponferrada
18:30 UTC+2	Cortés 24', 35'	Report	Rubio 44'	Stadium: Estadio El Toralín; Referee: Juan Antonio Campos Salinas

7 June 2025	Murcia	0–1 (1–2 agg.)	Gimnàstic	Murcia
20:30 UTC+2		Report	Fernández 59'	Stadium: Estadio Nueva Condomina; Attendance: 31,003; Referee: Alfonso de Ena Wolf

8 June 2025	Real Sociedad B	0–1 (a.e.t.) (1–1 agg.)	Mérida	San Sebastián
17:00 UTC+2		Report	Javi Eslava 73'	Stadium: Zubieta Facilities; Referee: Gerard Brull Acerete

8 June 2025	Ibiza	0–1 (0–3 agg.)	Andorra	Ibiza
19:00 UTC+2		Report	de León 63'	Stadium: Estadi Municipal de Can Misses; Referee: Fernando Román Román

=== Second round ===
==== Qualified teams ====
Group 1
Position	Team
2nd	Ponferradina
3rd	Real Sociedad B
4th	Andorra
5th	Gimnàstic

==== Matches ====
===== Finals =====
Team 1	Agg.	Team 2	1st leg	2nd leg
Andorra	2–1	Ponferradina	1–1	1–0
Gimnàstic	3–4	Real Sociedad B	1–3	2–1 (a.e.t.)

First leg

14 June 2025	Gimnàstic	1–3	Real Sociedad B	Tarragona
20:30 UTC+2	Fernández 82'	Report	Gorosabel 9'; Rodríguez 60'; Carrera 90+4'	Stadium: Nou Estadi Costa Daurada; Attendance: 14,591; Referee: Alejandro Morilla Turrión

15 June 2025	Andorra	1–1	Ponferradina	Encamp
17:00 UTC+2	Nieto 66'	Report	Valle 35'	Stadium: Estadi de la FAF; Attendance: 4,051; Referee: Alejandro Ojaos Valera

Second leg

21 June 2025	Ponferradina	0–1 (1–2 agg.)	Andorra	Ponferrada
20:30 UTC+2		Report	de León 56'	Stadium: Estadio El Toralín; Attendance: 8,492; Referee: Gorka Etayo Herrera

22 June 2025	Real Sociedad B	1–2 (a.e.t.) (4–3 agg.)	Gimnàstic	San Sebastián
20:00 UTC+2	Mújika 107'	Report	Jardí 37'; J. Oriol 78' (pen.)	Stadium: Zubieta Facilities; Referee: Abraham Domínguez Cervantes

== Promoted teams ==
- The two teams that were promoted to Segunda División through regular season groups and the two play–off winners are included.

Promoted to Segunda División
Ceuta (57 years later)	Cultural Leonesa (7 years later)	Andorra (1 year later)	Real Sociedad B (3 years later)
