= Manu Nieto =

Spanish footballer

Personal information
- Full name: Manuel Nieto Sánchez
- Date of birth: 29 March 1998 (age 28)
- Place of birth: Villa del Río, Spain
- Height: 1.82 m (6 ft 0 in)
- Position: Forward

Team information
- Current team: Eldense

Youth career
- Séneca
- 2014–2017: Betis

Senior career*
Years	Team	Apps	(Gls)
2015–2019	Betis B	49	(8)
2018	→ Alcalá (loan)	13	(2)
2019–2021	Cádiz B	44	(9)
2021–2022	Cádiz	2	(0)
2021–2022	→ Andorra (loan)	25	(4)
2022–2026	Andorra	88	(22)
2022–2023	→ Eldense (loan)	35	(6)
2024	→ Elche (loan)	11	(0)
2026–	Eldense	0	(0)
- * Club domestic league appearances and goals as of 9 June 2026

Manuel "Manu" Nieto Sánchez (born 29 March 1998) is a Spanish professional footballer who plays as a forward for Segunda División club CD Eldense.

== Club career ==
Nieto was born in Villa del Río, Córdoba, Andalusia, and joined Real Betis' youth setup in 2014, from Séneca CF. He made his senior debut with the reserves at the age of 17 on 27 September 2015, starting in a 0–1 Segunda División B away loss against UD Melilla.

Nieto scored his first senior goal on 2 October 2016, netting the fifth of a 5–0 home routing of CD San Roque de Lepe in the Tercera División. On 31 January 2018, after featuring sparingly, he was loaned to fourth division side CD Alcalá for the remainder of the season.

Upon returning, Nieto started to feature more regularly for the B-side before signing a two-year contract with Cádiz CF on 30 August 2019; he was assigned to the B-team in the third tier. On 17 January 2021, he renewed his contract until 2023.

Nieto made his first team – and La Liga – debut on 23 January 2021, coming on as a late substitute for Anthony Lozano in a 0–3 loss at Sevilla FC. On 28 June, he was loaned to Primera División RFEF side FC Andorra, for one year.

On 9 July 2022, after contributing with Andorra's first-ever promotion to Segunda División, Nieto signed a permanent two-year contract with the club. On 14 August, however, he was loaned to CD Eldense in the third division.

A regular starter for the Valencians, Nieto scored ten goals during the campaign (four only in the promotion play-offs) as Eldense returned to Segunda División after 59 years. He returned to the Tricolors in July 2023, and scored his first professional goals on 18 August, netting a hat-trick in a 3–2 home win over FC Cartagena.

On 7 January 2024, Nieto was loaned to fellow second division side Elche CF for the remainder of the season; he also renewed with the Tricolors until 2026. On 19 June 2026, he returned to Eldense on a permanent two-year deal.
