= Jesús Clemente =

Spanish footballer

Personal information
- Full name: Jesús Clemente Corcho
- Date of birth: 8 September 2000 (age 26)
- Place of birth: Badajoz, Spain
- Height: 1.85 m (6 ft 1 in)
- Positions: Right-back; winger

Team information
- Current team: Eldense
- Number: 17

Youth career
- Flecha Negra
- 2016–2019: Diocesano

Senior career*
Years	Team	Apps	(Gls)
2019–2020	Diocesano	24	(3)
2020–2022	Badajoz	54	(5)
2021	Badajoz B	1	(1)
2022–2024	Eldense	69	(5)
2024–2025	Andorra	31	(0)
2025–	Eldense	32	(3)
- * Club domestic league appearances and goals as of 10 June 2026

Jesús Clemente Corcho (born 8 September 2000) is a Spanish footballer who plays as a right-back or a right winger for CD Eldense.

== Club career ==
Born in Badajoz, Extremadura, Clemente finished his formation with local side CD Diocesano. Promoted to the main squad ahead of the 2019–20 season, he made his senior debut on 25 August 2019, starting in a 4–1 Tercera División away routing of Olivenza FC.

Clemente scored his first senior goal on 6 October 2019, but in a 2–1 away loss against CD Coria. On 26 August of the following year, he moved to Segunda División B side CD Badajoz.

Despite being regularly used in the first team during his first year, Clemente also featured with the reserves and helped in their promotion to Tercera División RFEF. He was a permanent member of the main squad in his second, with the club now in Primera División RFEF.

On 21 July 2022, Clemente joined CD Eldense also in the third division. A regular starter during the campaign, he contributed with four goals in 40 appearances overall as the side returned to Segunda División after a 59-year absence.

Clemente made his professional debut on 13 August 2023, coming on as a second-half substitute for Cris Montes in a 1–0 away win over FC Cartagena.
