= CF Reus Deportiu B =

Defunct association football club in Spain

Reus B
- Full name: Club de Futbol Reus Deportiu B
- Founded: 1960 (as FC Cambrils); 2016 (as CF Reus B)
- Dissolved: 20 October 2020; 4 years ago
- Ground: Municipal, Cambrils, Catalonia, Spain
- Owner: Clifton Onolfo
- League: None
- Website: http://www.cfreusdeportiu.com/
Home colours	Away colours

Club de Futbol Reus Deportiu B was a Spanish football team based in Cambrils, Tarragona in the autonomous community of Catalonia. Founded in 1960 as Futbol Club Cambrils, it was the reserve team of CF Reus Deportiu. They played their home games at Camp Municipal de Cambrils.

== History ==
Founded in 1960 as FC Cambrils, the club was incorporated in CF Reus Deportiu's structure in 2016, being renamed to CF Reus Deportiu B. In their first season after the change, the club achieved promotion to Tercera División after finishing second in the Primera Catalana.

On 20 October 2020, after the first team's dissolution, Reus B was also dissolved.

=== Club background ===
- Futbol Club Cambrils (1960–2016)
- Club de Futbol Reus Deportiu B (2016–2019)

== Season to season ==
- As FC Cambrils

Season	Tier	Division	Place	Copa del Rey
1967–68	5	2ª Reg.	9th	
1968–69	6	2ª Reg.	7th	
1969–70	6	2ª Reg.	8th	
1970–71	6	2ª Reg.	17th	
1971–72	6	2ª Reg.	9th	
1972–73	6	2ª Reg.	3rd	
1973–74	6	2ª Reg.	12th	
1974–75	6	2ª Reg.	4th	
1975–76	6	2ª Reg.		
1976–77	6	2ª Reg.	7th	
1977–78	7	2ª Reg.	2nd	
1978–79	6	1ª Reg.	1st	
1979–80	5	Reg. Pref.	10th	
1980–81	5	Reg. Pref.	16th	
1981–82	5	Reg. Pref.	15th	
1982–83	5	Reg. Pref.	10th	
1983–84	5	Reg. Pref.	16th	
1984–85	5	Reg. Pref.	18th	
1985–86	6	1ª Reg.	7th	
1986–87	6	1ª Reg.	10th	

Season	Tier	Division	Place	Copa del Rey
1987–88	5	Reg. Pref.	17th	
1988–89	6	1ª Reg.	3rd	
1989–90	6	1ª Reg.	5th	
1990–91	6	1ª Reg.	18th	
1991–92	8	2ª Terr.	6th	
1992–93	8	2ª Terr.	2nd	
1993–94	7	1ª Terr.	11th	
1994–95	7	1ª Terr.	16th	
1995–96	7	1ª Terr.	6th	
1996–97	7	1ª Terr.	1st	
1997–98	6	Pref. Terr.	8th	
1998–99	6	Pref. Terr.	11th	
1999–2000	6	Pref. Terr.	6th	
2000–01	6	Pref. Terr.	17th	
2001–02	7	1ª Terr.	4th	
2002–03	7	1ª Terr.	1st	
2003–04	6	Pref. Terr.	10th	
2004–05	6	Pref. Terr.	8th	
2005–06	6	Pref. Terr.	8th	
2006–07	6	Pref. Terr.	11th	

Season	Tier	Division	Place	Copa del Rey
2007–08	6	Pref. Terr.	14th	
2008–09	6	Pref. Terr.	9th	
2009–10	6	Pref. Terr.	15th	
2010–11	7	1ª Terr.	7th	
2011–12	6	2ª Cat.	12th	
2012–13	6	2ª Cat.	9th	
2013–14	6	2ª Cat.	14th	
2014–15	6	2ª Cat.	6th	
2015–16	6	2ª Cat.	1st	

- As CF Reus Deportiu B

Season	Tier	Division	Place
2016–17	5	1ª Cat.	2nd
2017–18	4	3ª	14th
2018–19	4	3ª	7th
2019–20	5	1ª Cat.	R

- 2 seasons in Tercera División

== See also ==
- Category:CF Reus Deportiu B players
