= Club Gimnàstic de Manresa =

Association football club in Spain

Gimnàstic Manresa
- Full name: Club Gimnàstic de Manresa
- Nickname: Nàstic
- Founded: 1947; 79 years ago
- Ground: Gimnàstic Parc, Manresa, Catalonia, Spain
- Capacity: 1,500
- Owner: Gerard Piqué
- President: Ferran Vilaseca
- Head coach: Oriol Hontangas
- League: Primera Catalana – Group 2
- 2025–26: Primera Catalana – Group 2, 8th of 16
Home colours	Away colours

Club Gimnàstic de Manresa is a Spanish football team based in Manresa, in the autonomous community of Catalonia. Founded in 1947, the club competes in the Primera Catalana – Group 2, holding home games at Gimnàstic Parc, with a capacity of 1,500 spectators.

A current farm team of FC Andorra, the club is known for their youth categories, notably being the first club of Pep Guardiola.

== History ==
Founded in 1947 as Club Gimnástico Manresa, Gimnàstic Manresa only adopted their current name in 1978. Their senior side only played in the lower leagues before ceasing activities in 2006.

Back to action in 2010, Gimnàstic spent six seasons active (five of them in Tercera Catalana) before again closing their senior team in 2016. In July 2019, the club was acquired by Gerard Piqué through his firm Kosmos Holding, with the intent of becoming the academy of FC Andorra, another club owned by his firm. The agreement with Andorra was only announced on 1 July 2020, however.

On 22 June 2024, Gimnàstic merged with CF Artesa de Lleida to establish a senior team, serving as the farm team of Andorra in Primera Catalana. The merger also included a proposal of a name change to Club Gimnàstic d'Andorra, which was rejected by the club's associates.

== Season to season ==
Season	Tier	Division	Place	Copa del Rey
1947–1968	—	Regional	—	
1968–69	6	2ª Reg.	17th	
1969–70	6	2ª Reg.	17th	
1970–71	6	2ª Reg.	20th	
1971–72	7	3ª Reg.		
1972–73	7	3ª Reg.		
1973–74	7	3ª Reg.	1st	
1974–75	6	2ª Reg.	20th	
1975–76	DNP			
1976–77	7	3ª Reg.	6th	
1977–78	8	3ª Reg.	15th	
1978–79	8	3ª Reg.	6th	
1979–80	8	3ª Reg.	5th	
1980–81	8	3ª Reg.	7th	
1981–82	8	3ª Reg.	6th	
1982–83	8	3ª Reg.	9th	
1983–84	8	3ª Reg.	9th	
1984–85	8	3ª Reg.	5th	
1985–86	7	2ª Reg.	2nd	
1986–87	7	2ª Reg.	13th	

Season	Tier	Division	Place	Copa del Rey
1987–88	7	2ª Reg.	6th	
1988–89	7	2ª Reg.	4th	
1989–90	7	2ª Reg.	17th	
1990–91	8	3ª Reg.	7th	
1991–92	9	3ª Terr.	2nd	
1992–93	8	2ª Terr.	10th	
1993–94	8	2ª Terr.	5th	
1994–95	8	2ª Terr.	17th	
1995–96	9	3ª Terr.	2nd	
1996–97	8	2ª Terr.	15th	
1997–98	8	2ª Terr.	15th	
1998–99	8	2ª Terr.	17th	
1999–2000	9	3ª Terr.	7th	
2000–01	9	3ª Terr.	4th	
2001–02	9	3ª Terr.	1st	
2002–03	8	2ª Terr.	5th	
2003–04	8	2ª Terr.	5th	
2004–05	8	2ª Terr.	15th	
2005–06	8	2ª Terr.	18th	
2006–2010	DNP			

Season	Tier	Division	Place	Copa del Rey
2010–11	9	3ª Terr.	1st	
2011–12	7	3ª Cat.	5th	
2012–13	7	3ª Cat.	9th	
2013–14	7	3ª Cat.	15th	
2014–15	7	3ª Cat.	6th	
2015–16	7	3ª Cat.	12th	
2016–2021	DNP			
2021–22	9	4ª Cat.	1st	
2022–23	8	3ª Cat.	5th	
2023–24	DNP			
2024–25	7	1ª Cat.	6th	
2025–26	7	1ª Cat.		

== Players ==
=== Current squad ===
As of 25 October 2026

Note: Flags indicate national team as defined under FIFA eligibility rules; some limited exceptions apply. Players may hold more than one non-FIFA nationality.

No.	Pos.	Nation	Player
1	GK	ESP	Sergi Taulats
2	DF	ESP	Adrià Prado (4th captain)
3	DF	ESP	Pol Fornell (vice-captain)
4	DF	ESP	Nil Pradas (3rd captain)
5	DF	MAR	Hicham Karrouch
6	MF	ESP	Marc Grifell (captain)
7	FW	ESP	Nana
8	MF	ESP	Onan Quesada
9	FW	ESP	Eloi Moral
10	MF	ESP	Pipe (5th captain)
11	FW	ESP	Rafa

No.	Pos.	Nation	Player
13	GK	ESP	Aleix Casals
14	MF	ESP	Marcel Bellido
15	MF	ESP	Marc Cuello
16	DF	FRA	Ethan Girard
17	FW	ESP	Hugo Rodríguez
18	FW	ESP	Marc Padilla
19	FW	ESP	Malick Diakite
20	DF	ESP	Ayoub
22	FW	ESP	Izan Quesada
23	MF	ESP	Ansu

=== Youth players ===
Note: Flags indicate national team as defined under FIFA eligibility rules; some limited exceptions apply. Players may hold more than one non-FIFA nationality.

No. / Pos. / Nation / Player; 16 / DF / ESP / Roc Bartoló	No. / Pos. / Nation / Player; 21 / DF / ESP / Alex Corbalan
