= 2026–27 FC Andorra season =

FC Andorra
2026–27 season
- President: Ferran Vilaseca
- Manager: Carles Manso
- Stadium: Estadi de la FAF, Encamp
- Segunda División: pre-season
- Copa del Rey: pre-season
Home colours	Away colours	Third colours

The 2026–27 season is the 84rd in the history of FC Andorra. The club will compete in the Spanish Segunda División, the second consecutive in same lever, and will also participate in the Copa del Rey.

Nico Ratti, Sergio Molina, Martí Vilà, Diego Alende, and Lautaro de León will be the captains of FC Andorra's first team for the new season.

On July 2026, Andorra agreed terms with the Andorran Football Federation to extend their lease at the Estadi de la FAF, in Encamp, for two more seasons.

== Players ==
=== Current squad ===
As of 1 September 2026

Note: Flags indicate national team as defined under FIFA eligibility rules; some limited exceptions apply. Players may hold more than one non-FIFA nationality.

No.	Pos.	Nation	Player
1	GK	ARG	Nico Ratti (captain)
2	DF	ESP	Juan Sebastián
3	DF	ARG	Lautaro Spatz
4	DF	ESP	Gael Alonso
5	DF	ESP	Marc Bombardó
6	MF	ESP	Hugo Solozábal
7	FW	ESP	Álex Calvo
8	MF	TUR	Efe Akman
9	FW	NED	Julian Rijkhoff (on loan from Ajax)
10	MF	ESP	Marc Domènech
11	FW	URU	Lautaro de León
12	FW	ROU	Enes Sali
13	GK	ESP	Pau López
14	MF	ESP	Sergio Molina (vice-captain)

No.	Pos.	Nation	Player
15	FW	ESP	Jordi Cano
16	MF	PHI	Randy Schneider
17	DF	FRA	Thomas Carrique
18	DF	ESP	Andoni López
19	MF	ESP	Nacho Quintana
20	DF	ESP	Martí Vilà (3rd captain)
21	FW	ESP	Moró Sidibe
22	FW	ESP	Diego Díaz (on loan from Racing Santander)
23	DF	ESP	Diego Alende (4th captain)
24	MF	FRA	Théo Le Normand
25	GK	GEQ	Jesús Owono
27	FW	SRB	Stefan Golubović
28	DF	ESP	Tiago Olmedo
29	FW	ESP	Hugo López (on loan from Villarreal)

=== Youth players ===
Note: Flags indicate national team as defined under FIFA eligibility rules; some limited exceptions apply. Players may hold more than one non-FIFA nationality.

No. / Pos. / Nation / Player; 32 / DF / ESP / Jordi Toribio	No. / Pos. / Nation / Player; — / FW / GEO / Saba Samushia

=== Out on loan ===
Note: Flags indicate national team as defined under FIFA eligibility rules; some limited exceptions apply. Players may hold more than one non-FIFA nationality.

No.	Pos.	Nation	Player
—	GK	ESP	Jan Lagunas (at FC Santa Coloma until 30 June 2027)
—	DF	AND	Iván Rodríguez (at Huesca until 30 June 2027)
—	FW	AND	Aron Rodrigo (at Mirandés until 30 June 2027)

No.	Pos.	Nation	Player
—	FW	ESP	Aitor Uzkudun (at Mirandés until 30 June 2027)
—	FW	AND	Berto Rosas (at Logroñés until 30 June 2027)
—	FW	ESP	Bilal Achhiba (at Manresa until 30 June 2027)

== Transfers ==
=== Transfers In ===
Pos.	Player	Transferred from	Fee	Date	Source
DF	(Andorra) Iván Rodríguez	Villarreal B	Loan return	30 June 2026	
DF	(Spain) Jan Encuentra	Unionistas	Loan return	30 June 2026	
DF	(Spain) Javier Vicario	Barakaldo	Loan return	30 June 2026	
MF	(Spain) Luismi Redondo	Cartagena	Loan return	30 June 2026	
FW	(Spain) Aitor Uzkudun	Real Avilés	Loan return	30 June 2026	
FW	(Andorra) Berto Rosas	Logroñés	Loan return	30 June 2026	
FW	(Spain) Bilal Achhiba	Atlètic Lleida	Loan return	30 June 2026	
FW	(Greece) Christos Almpanis	Gimnàstic	Loan return	30 June 2026	
FW	(Colombia) Juanda Fuentes	Gimnàstic	Loan return	30 June 2026	
FW	(Serbia) Stefan Golubović	Cornellà	Loan return	30 June 2026	
MF	(Spain) Hugo Solozábal	Getafe B	Free	1 July 2026	
FW	(Spain) Moró Sidibe	Atlètic Lleida	Free	2 July 2026	
DF	(Spain) Andoni López	Ponferradina	Free	4 July 2026	
FW	(Andorra) Aron Rodrigo	Huesca B	Free	4 July 2026	
DF	(Spain) Juan Sebastián	Zaragoza	Free	5 July 2026	
MF	(Spain) Nacho Quintana	Eldense	Free	9 July 2026	
MF	(Philippines) Randy Schneider	Winterthur	Free	13 July 2026	
FW	(Spain) Jordi Cano	Europa	Free	14 July 2026	
GK	(Spain) Pau López	Betis	Free	17 July 2026	
FW	(Netherlands) Julian Rijkhoff	Ajax	Loan	27 July 2026	
DF	(Argentina) Lautaro Spatz	Villarreal B	Undisclosed	3 August 2026	
FW	(Romania) Enes Sali	FC Dallas	Free	7 August 2026	
FW	(Spain) Hugo López	Villarreal B	Loan	11 August 2026	
GK	(Spain) Jan Lagunas	Gimnàstic Manresa	Youth system	13 August 2026	
DF	(Spain) Tiago Olmedo	Gimnàstic Manresa	Youth system	13 August 2026	
GK	(Equatorial Guinea) Jesús Owono	Deportivo Alavés	Free	26 August 2026	
FW	(Spain) Diego Díaz	Racing Santander	Loan	1 September 2026	

=== Transfers Out ===
Pos.	Player	Transferred to	Fee	Date	Source
GK	(Equatorial Guinea) Jesús Owono	Deportivo Alavés	End of loan	30 June 2026	
GK	(Hungary) Áron Yaakobishvili	Barcelona Atlètic	End of loan	30 June 2026	
DF	(Spain) Álex Petxarroman	Deportivo A Coruña	End of loan	30 June 2026	
DF	(Spain) Edgar González	Almería	End of loan	30 June 2026	
DF	(Spain) Imanol García de Albéniz	Sparta Prague	End of loan	30 June 2026	
FW	(South Korea) Kim Min-su	Girona	End of loan	30 June 2026	
FW	(Portugal) Jastin García	Girona	End of loan	30 June 2026	
FW	(Spain) Aingeru Olabarrieta	Athletic Bilbao	End of loan	30 June 2026	
FW	(Spain) Yeray Cabanzón	Racing Santander	End of loan	30 June 2026	
MF	(Spain) Alberto Solís		End of contract	30 June 2026	
MF	(Spain) Álvaro Martín	Castellón	End of contract	30 June 2026	
FW	(Spain) Manu Nieto	Eldense	End of contract	30 June 2026	
FW	(Spain) Marc Cardona	Bangkok United	End of contract	30 June 2026	
DF	(Spain) Javier Vicario		Contract terminated	30 June 2026	
DF	(Spain) Jan Encuentra	Villarreal B	Undisclosed	30 June 2026	
MF	(Spain) Luismi Redondo	Huesca	Undisclosed	30 June 2026	
DF	(Andorra) Iván Rodríguez	Huesca	Loan	8 July 2026	
FW	(Colombia) Juanda Fuentes	Penafiel	Undisclosed	10 July 2026	
FW	(Andorra) Berto Rosas	Logroñés	Loan	23 July 2026	
MF	(Spain) Dani Villahermosa	Oviedo	Undisclosed	25 July 2026	
FW	(Andorra) Aron Rodrigo	Mirandés	Loan	4 August 2026	
FW	(Greece) Christos Almpanis	Larissa	Free	5 August 2026	
FW	(Spain) Josep Cerdà	Mallorca	Undisclosed	7 August 2026	
FW	(Spain) Aitor Uzkudun	Mirandés	Loan	18 August 2026	
GK	(Spain) Jan Lagunas	FC Santa Coloma	Loan	1 September 2026	
FW	(Spain) Bilal Achhiba	Manresa	Loan	1 September 2026	

== Friendlies ==
On 12 June 2026, the team defined the first part of its preparation for the 2026–27 season. Activities began on July 6 with the usual medical check-ups and tests before the squad starts with the first training sessions. Two days later, on 8 July, the team traveling to Pinatar Arena, in San Pedro del Pinatar, where they holding their preseason training camp until 18 July.

14 July 2026	Andorra	2–1	(England) Millwall	San Pedro del Pinatar, Spain
9:00	Golubović 81'; Quintana 84'		Servais 76'	Stadium: Pinatar Arena

18 July 2026	Andorra	0–0	(England) Stevenage	San Pedro del Pinatar, Spain
9:00				Stadium: Pinatar Arena

24 July 2026	Andorra	5–2	(Andorra) Inter d'Escaldes	Andorra la Vella, Andorra
10:00	Calvo 13'; Uzkudun 31'; Rodrigo 59'; Solozábal 71'; Quintana 76'		Sibide 54'; Faysal 57'	Stadium: Estadi Comunal

25 July 2026	Gimnàstic Tarragona (Spain)	0–2	Andorra	Tarragona, Spain
20:00			Cano 5'; Solozábal 85'	Stadium: Nou Estadi Costa Daurada

30 July 2026	Andorra	0–0	(Spain) Europa	Andorra la Vella, Andorra
19:00				Stadium: Estadi Comunal

1 August 2026	Sabadell (Spain)	0–0	Andorra	Sant Cugat del Vallès, Spain
20:00				Stadium: CAR Sant Cugat

6 August 2026	Zaragoza (Spain)	0–1	Andorra	Cuarte de Huerva, Spain
20:00			Sidibe 77'	Stadium: Ciudad Deportiva

7 August 2026	Huesca (Spain)	4–0	Andorra	Huesca, Spain
18:30	García 13'; Luismi 55'; Enrich 74'; Osán 83'			Stadium: Base Aragonesa de Fútbol

== Competitions ==
=== Segunda División ===
==== League table ====
Pos	Team	Pld	W	D	L	GF	GA	GD	Pts	Qualification or relegation
18	Real Sociedad B	14	3	4	7	17	24	−7	13	Not eligible for promotion
19	Cádiz	14	2	5	7	17	19	−2	11	Relegation to Primera Federación
20	Andorra	13	3	2	8	18	23	−5	11	Relegation to Primera Federación
21	Albacete	13	3	1	9	13	24	−11	10	Relegation to Primera Federación
22	Ceuta	14	1	2	11	10	32	−22	5	Relegation to Primera Federación

Updated to match(es) played on 15 November 2026. Source: LaLiga Hypermotion
Rules for classification: 1) Points; 2) Head-to-head points; 3) Head-to-head goal difference; 4) Goal difference; 5) Goals scored; 6) Fair-play points
(Note: Head-to-head record is used only after all the matches between the teams in question have been played)

==== Matches ====
15 August 2026 1	Andorra	5–1	Ceuta	Encamp
17:00	Cano 33'; Solozábal (yellow card) 49'; Domènech (yellow card) 52'; Carrique 62'; Golubović (yellow card) 67'; Quintana 69'; Quintana 84'; Calvo 90+1'		Escobar 87'; Mamah (yellow card) 90+1'	Stadium: Estadi de la FAF; Attendance: 1,730; Referee: Rafael Sánchez López

24 August 2026 2	Celta Fortuna	4–2	Andorra	Vigo
14:00	Somuah 55'; Capdevila (yellow card) 57'; Ribes (yellow card) 64'; Marcos (yellow card) 84'; Marín 87'; Rodríguez (yellow card) 90+3'; Marín 90+7'; Antañón 90+11'		Solozábal (yellow card) 6'; Vilà (yellow card) 14'; Akman (yellow card) 45'; H. López 49'; H. López 52'	Stadium: Balaídos; Attendance: 6,445; Referee: José Antonio Sánchez Villalobos

30 August 2026 3	Andorra	0–1	Eibar	Encamp
17:00	Alende (yellow card) 27'		Garrido 46'; Magunazelaia (red card) 55'	Stadium: Estadi de la FAF; Attendance: 2,720; Referee: Alejandro Ojaos Valera

5 September 2026 4	Valladolid	1–0	Andorra	Valladolid
12:30	Alende 11' (o.g.); Clerc (yellow card) 19'; Ponceau (yellow card) 62'; Lachuer (red card) 90+8'		Akman (yellow card) 32'; Sidibe (yellow card) 39'; Bombardó (yellow card) 67'; Alende (yellow card) 87'	Stadium: José Zorrilla; Attendance: 15,989; Referee: Alejandro Morilla Turrión

12 September 2026 5	Andorra	1–3	Real Sociedad B	Encamp
09:00	Spatz (yellow card) 67'; de León 70'		Díaz 11'; Astiazaran 34'; Agote (yellow card) 37'; Rupérez 41'; Lebarbier (yellow card) 53'; Aguirre (yellow card) 72'; Astiazaran (yellow card) 79'; Mariezkurrena (yellow card) 84'	Stadium: Estadi de la FAF; Attendance: 2,633; Referee: José Luis Guzmán Mansilla

19 September 2026 6	Andorra	1–3	Sporting Gijón	Encamp
11:15	Cano 48'; Molina (yellow card) 89'		Duñabeitia 7'; Rosas (yellow card) 20'; Iosifov (yellow card) 37'; Casas 66'; Duñabeitia (yellow card) 74'; Iosifov 90+7'	Stadium: Estadi de la FAF; Attendance: 2,831; Referee: Pablo Morales Moreno

26 September 2026 7	Granada	2–3	Andorra	Granada
16:15	Lama 48'; Lama (yellow card) 72'; Gambín 78'; Hormigo (yellow card) 81'		Cano 7'; Carrique (yellow card) 15'; Solozábal (yellow card) 17'; Domènech 33'; Cano 50'; P. López (yellow card) 65'; de León (yellow card) 73'; Domènech (yellow card) 82'; Golubović (yellow card) 89'; Molina (yellow card) 90+3'; Alende (yellow card) 90+5'	Stadium: Nuevo Cármenes; Attendance: 11,823; Referee: Juan Manuel Gordillo Escamilla

4 October 2026 8	Sabadell	0–0	Andorra	Sabadell
21:00	Obolskiy (yellow card) 34'; Priego (yellow card) 76'		A. López (yellow card) 36'; Akman (yellow card) 44'; Domènech (yellow card) 48'; Cano (yellow card) 67'; Alende (yellow card) 76'	Stadium: Nova Creu Alta; Attendance: 7,672; Referee: José Luis Guzmán Mansilla

11 October 2026 9	Andorra	1–0	Castellón	Encamp
14:00	Sidibe 13'; Akman (yellow card) 30'; Domènech (yellow card) 37'; Spatz (yellow card) 66'; Rijkhoff (yellow card) 90+2'		Sienra (yellow card) 83'; Jiménez (yellow card) 90'	Stadium: Estadi de la FAF; Attendance: 2,320; Referee: Abraham Domínguez Cervantes

18 October 2026 10	Girona	2–0	Andorra	Girona
18:30	Gil 5'; Vanat 31'; Francés (yellow card) 65'; Pyshchur (yellow card) 67'		Domènech (yellow card) 29'; Alende (yellow card) 49'	Stadium: Montilivi; Attendance: 9,500; Referee: Dámaso Arcediano Monescillo

26 October 2026 11	Andorra	2–3	Burgos	Encamp
16:30	de León 14'; Sidibe (yellow card) 25'; Cano 43'		Karrikaburu 10'; Luengo 17'; C. Sánchez 28' (pen.); Vencedor (yellow card) 88'	Stadium: Estadi de la FAF; Attendance: 2,153; Referee: Daniel Miranda Bolaños

2 November 2026 12	Tenerife	2–2	Andorra	Santa Cruz de Tenerife
10:00	Gomis 3'; Gallego 39' (pen.); Gallego (yellow card) 45+2'; Martín (yellow card) 84' (red card) 85'; Krdžalić (yellow card) 90+4'		Spatz (yellow card) 20'; de León (yellow card) 23' (red card) 85'; Akman (yellow card) 26'; Vilà (yellow card) 37'; Sidibe (yellow card) 37'; Alende (yellow card) 66'; de León 83' (pen.); Golubović 88'; Owono (red card) 90+7'	Stadium: Heliodoro Rodríguez López; Attendance: 13,097; Referee: Manuel Ángel Pérez Hernández

14 November 2026 14	Almería	2–1	Andorra	Almería
18:30	Arribas 26' (pen.); Vesga (yellow card) 32'; de la Fuente 39'		Alende (yellow card) 24' (red card) 90'; Schneider (yellow card) 45+1'; H. López 66' (pen.); Domènech (yellow card) 81'	Stadium: UD Almería Stadium; Attendance: 13,937; Referee: Andrés Fuentes Molina

=== Copa del Rey ===
29 October 2026 First round	Varea	0–3	Andorra	Logroño
16:30			Díaz 32'; Rijkhoff 49'; Domènech (yellow card) 52'; Quintana 71'	Stadium: Estadio Las Gaunas; Attendance: 800; Referee: Rafael Sánchez López
