= Stefan Golubović =

Stefan Golubović may refer to:

- Stefan Golubović (footballer, born 1996), Serbian football forward for Southern
- Stefan Golubović (footballer, born 2006), Serbian football forward for FC Andorra
