= Lucas Rodríguez =

Lucas Rodríguez may refer to:

- Lucas Rodríguez (footballer, born 1986), Argentine football coach and former midfielder
- Lucas Rodríguez (footballer, born 1993), Argentine football left-back
- Lucas Rodríguez (footballer, born 1997), Argentine football winger
- Lucas Rodríguez (footballer, born 1999), Uruguayan football centre-back
