= Noah Rodríguez =

Spanish footballer (born 2008)

Personal information
- Full name: Noah Rodríguez Guallar
- Date of birth: 27 August 2008 (age 18)
- Place of birth: Barcelona, Spain
- Position: Midfielder

Team information
- Current team: Celta B
- Number: 27

Youth career
- Candeán
- 2017–: Celta

Senior career*
Years	Team	Apps	(Gls)
2025–	Celta B	3	(0)
- * Club domestic league appearances and goals as of 7 November 2026

Noah Rodríguez Guallar (born 27 August 2008) is a Spanish professional footballer who plays as a midfielder for RC Celta Fortuna.

== Career ==
Born in Barcelona, Catalonia, Rodríguez joined RC Celta de Vigo's youth sides in 2017, from UVCD Candeán. He made his senior debut with the reserves on 21 September 2025, coming on as a late substitute for Joel López in a 2–0 Primera Federación home win over Arenas Club de Getxo, and featured in one further match for the side as they achieved promotion to Segunda División.

Rodríguez made his professional debut with the B-team on 7 November 2026, replacing Seyni Mbaye Ndiaye late into a 2–1 away loss to Burgos CF for the second division championship.
