= Moró Sidibe =

Spanish footballer (born 2001)

Personal information
- Full name: Moró Sidibe Sidibe
- Date of birth: 24 December 2001 (age 24)
- Place of birth: Cervera, Spain
- Height: 1.92 m (6 ft 4 in)
- Position: Forward

Team information
- Current team: Andorra
- Number: 21

Youth career
- Mollerussa
- 2019–2020: Lleida Esportiu

Senior career*
Years	Team	Apps	(Gls)
2020–2022	Lleida Esportiu B	4	(2)
2021–2022	→ Mollerussa (loan)	12	(5)
2022–2023	Binéfar	23	(4)
2023–2024	Mollerussa	38	(5)
2024–2026	Atlètic Lleida	63	(13)
2026–	Andorra	1	(0)
- * Club domestic league appearances and goals as of 24 August 2026

Moró Sidibe Sidibe (born 24 December 2001) is a Spanish professional footballer who plays as a forward for Segunda División club FC Andorra.

== Career ==
Born in Cervera, Lleida, Catalonia to Malian parents, Sidibe played for Lleida Esportiu as a youth before making his senior debut with the reserves in 2020, in Segona Catalana. In September 2021, he was loaned to Primera Catalana side CFJ Mollerussa, but suffered a knee injury in October which limited his playing time.

On 27 July 2022, Sidibe was announced at Tercera Federación side CD Binéfar. Despite being regularly used, he returned to Mollerussa the following 31 March, and helped the club to return to a national division after 30 years, also scoring in the decisive match.

On 29 July 2024, Sidibe signed for CE Atlètic Lleida also in the fifth division. On 13 July of the following year, after helping the side to achieve promotion to Segunda Federación, he renewed his contract for a further year.

On 2 July 2026, Sidibe moved straight to Segunda División after signing a one-year deal with FC Andorra, with an option for a further two seasons. He made his professional debut on 24 August, starting and providing the assist to Hugo López's second goal in a 4–2 away loss to RC Celta Fortuna.
