= Mateo Sobral =

Spanish footballer (born 2009)

Personal information
- Full name: Mateo Sobral Sabajanes
- Date of birth: 13 January 2009 (age 17)
- Place of birth: Soutomaior, Spain
- Position: Midfielder

Team information
- Current team: Celta B
- Number: 29

Youth career
- Arcadia
- 2017–: Celta

Senior career*
Years	Team	Apps	(Gls)
2026–	Celta B	2	(0)

International career
2025–	Spain U17	3	(0)
2026–	Spain U18	1	(0)
- * Club domestic league appearances and goals as of 5 September 2026

Mateo Sobral Sabajanes (born 13 January 2009) is a Spanish professional footballer who plays as a midfielder for RC Celta Fortuna.

== Club career ==
Born in Soutomaior, Pontevedra, Galicia, Sobral joined RC Celta de Vigo's youth sides in 2017, from Arcadia EF. After being regularly used in the Juvenil squad, he made his senior debut with the reserves on 23 May 2026, coming on as a late substitute for Adrià Capdevila in a 1–1 Primera Federación away draw against Barakaldo CF.

Sobral made his professional debut with the B-side on 5 September 2026, starting in a 2–0 Segunda División away win over AD Ceuta FC; aged 17, he became the first youth player to ever appear for Fortuna in a professional match.

== International career ==
Sobral received call-ups to the Spain under-16, under-17 and under-18 levels.
