= Marc Domènech =

Marc Domènech may refer to:

- Marc Domènech (footballer, born 2002), Spanish football midfielder
- Marc Domènech (footballer, born 2006), Spanish football forward
