= Jorge Pérez-Lafuente =

Spanish footballer (born 2008)

Personal information
- Full name: Jorge Pérez-Lafuente Rey
- Date of birth: 16 May 2008 (age 18)
- Place of birth: Pontevedra, Spain
- Height: 1.84 m (6 ft 0 in)
- Position: Forward

Team information
- Current team: Celta B
- Number: 26

Youth career
- AJ Lérez
- 2022–: Celta

Senior career*
Years	Team	Apps	(Gls)
2026–	Celta B	11	(0)

International career
2026–	Spain U19	2	(0)
- * Club domestic league appearances and goals as of 26 September 2026

Jorge Pérez-Lafuente Rey (born 16 May 2008) is a Spanish professional footballer who plays as a forward for RC Celta Fortuna.

== Club career ==
Born in Pontevedra, Galicia, Pérez-Lafuente joined RC Celta de Vigo's youth sides in 2022, from AJ Lérez. He made his senior debut with the reserves on 4 January 2026, coming on as a late substitute for Andrés Antañón in a 3–2 Primera Federación away win over CP Cacereño.

On 24 March 2026, Pérez-Lafuente renewed his contract with the Celestes until 2030, and finished the season with ten appearances with the B's as the side achieved promotion to Segunda División. He made his professional debut with the team on 26 September, replacing Álvaro Marín late into a 1–1 home draw against CE Sabadell FC.

== International career ==
In March 2026, Pérez-Lafuente was called up to the Spain national under-18 team.
