= Lautaro Spatz =

Argentine footballer (born 2001)

Personal information
- Full name: Lautaro Marco Spatz Di Lorenzo
- Date of birth: 19 October 2001 (age 25)
- Place of birth: Buenos Aires, Argentina
- Height: 1.85 m (6 ft 1 in)
- Position: Centre-back

Team information
- Current team: Andorra
- Number: 3

Youth career
- Defensores de Belgrano
- Puerto Malagueño
- 2017–2018: Elche
- 2018–2020: Cádiz

Senior career*
Years	Team	Apps	(Gls)
2020–2023	Cádiz B	53	(1)
2022–2023	Cádiz	0	(0)
2023	→ Montevideo City Torque (loan)	2	(0)
2023–2024	Antequera	21	(2)
2024–2025	Algeciras	35	(3)
2025–2026	Villarreal B	31	(3)
2026–	Andorra	1	(0)
- * Club domestic league appearances and goals as of 15 August 2026

Lautaro Marco Spatz Di Lorenzo (born 19 October 2001) is an Argentine professional footballer who plays as a centre-back for Segunda División club FC Andorra.

== Career ==
Born in Buenos Aires, Spatz began his career with Defensores de Belgrano before moving to Málaga in 2009, aged eight. He played for CD Puerto Malagueño in that city, and subsequently represented Elche and Cádiz as a youth. He made his senior debut with the latter's reserves on 9 February 2020, starting and being sent off in a 1–1 Segunda División B home draw against Cartagena.

After establishing himself as a regular starter for the B-team, Spatz made his first team debut with the Submarino Amarillo on 13 November 2022, playing the full 90 minutes in a 3–2 away loss to Real Unión, for the season's Copa del Rey. On 30 January 2023, he was loaned to Uruguayan side Montevideo City Torque until June.

Spatz made his professional debut on 5 February 2023, coming on as a half-time substitute for Lucas Rodríguez in a 1–1 home draw against Danubio. He returned to his parent club after just one further appearance, and signed for Primera Federación side Antequera on 2 September.

On 17 July 2024, Spatz was announced at fellow third division side Algeciras. On 11 August of the following year, he agreed to a two-year contract with Villarreal, being assigned to the B's also in division three.

On 3 August 2026, Spatz joined Segunda División side FC Andorra on a two-year deal.

== Personal life ==
Spatz's great-grandfather Alfredo Garasini was also a footballer.
