= Richard Imbernón =

Andorran football manager (born 1970)

Personal information
- Full name: Richard Imbernón Ríos
- Date of birth: 21 December 1975 (age 50)
- Place of birth: Andorra la Vella, Andorra

Senior career*
Years	Team	Apps	(Gls)
–1996	FC Andorra B		
1996–1999	CE Principat		
1999–2001	Constel·lació Esportiva		
2001–2004	UE Sant Julià		
2004–2005	FC Santa Coloma		
2005–2006	UE Sant Julià		
2007	Atlètic Club d'Escaldes		
2007–2008	UE Extremenya		

Managerial career
- 2008–2012: FC Andorra
- 2013–2018: FC Santa Coloma
- 2018: FC Andorra
- 2019: Inter Club d'Escaldes
- 2019–2022: Andorra U19
- 2022–2023: Penya Encarnada d'Andorra
- 2023–: CF Esperança d'Andorra
- * Club domestic league appearances and goals

Richard Imbernón Ríos (born 21 December 1975) is an Andorran football manager who manages CF Esperança d'Andorra.

== Career ==
He started his playing career with FC Andorra B. In 1996, he signed for CE Principat. In 1999, he signed for Constel·lació Esportiva. In 2001, he signed for UE Sant Julià. In 2004, he signed for FC Santa Coloma. In 2005, he returned to UE Sant Julià. In 2007, he signed for Atlètic Club d'Escaldes. After that, he signed for UE Extremenya.

In 2008, he was appointed manager of FC Andorra. In 2013, he was appointed manager of FC Santa Coloma. He helped the club win the league. In 2018, he returned as manager of FC Andorra. In 2019, he was appointed manager of Inter Club d'Escaldes. After that, he was appointed manager of the Andorra national under-19 football team. In 2022, he was appointed manager of Penya Encarnada d'Andorra. In 2023, he was appointed manager of CF Esperança d'Andorra.

== Personal life ==
He was born on 21 December 1975 in Andorra la Vella, Andorra. He is of Spanish descent through his parents. He has four older siblings. He has regarded Spain international Lobo Carrasco as his football idol. He attended film school in France. After that, he studied business management. He has published books.
