= Ángel Davila =

Spanish footballer (born 2007)

Personal information
- Full name: Ángel Davila Outerelo
- Date of birth: 16 March 2007 (age 19)
- Place of birth: Ponteareas, Spain
- Position: Forward

Team information
- Current team: Celta B
- Number: 19

Youth career
- Vila do Corpus
- 2017–2026: Celta

Senior career*
Years	Team	Apps	(Gls)
2026–	Celta B	1	(0)
- * Club domestic league appearances and goals as of 31 August 2026

Ángel Davila Outerelo (born 16 March 2007) is a Spanish professional footballer who plays as a forward for RC Celta Fortuna.

== Career ==
Born in Ponteareas, Pontevedra, Galicia, Davila began his career at the age of five with hometown side AD Vila do Corpus, and joined RC Celta de Vigo's youth sides in 2017, aged nine. On 7 July 2026, after scoring 15 goals for the Juvenil squad, he renewed his contract until 2030 and was promoted to the reserves in Segunda División.

Davila made his professional debut with the B-team on 31 August 2026, coming on as a late substitute for Ángel Marcos in a 2–1 home loss to CD Castellón.
