= Diego Alende =

Spanish footballer (born 1997)

Personal information
- Full name: Diego Alende López
- Date of birth: 25 August 1997 (age 29)
- Place of birth: Santiago de Compostela, Spain
- Height: 1.83 m (6 ft 0 in)
- Position: Centre-back

Team information
- Current team: Andorra
- Number: 23

Youth career
- 2005–2016: Celta

Senior career*
Years	Team	Apps	(Gls)
2015–2019	Celta B	111	(2)
2015	Celta	1	(0)
2019–2020	Valladolid B	25	(1)
2020–2022	Valladolid	0	(0)
2020–2022	→ Lugo (loan)	55	(0)
2022–	Andorra	90	(4)

International career
2016	Spain U19	4	(0)
- * Club domestic league appearances and goals as of 9 June 2026

Diego Alende López (born 25 August 1997) is a Spanish professional footballer who plays as a centre-back for Segunda División club FC Andorra.

== Club career ==
=== Celta Vigo ===
Born in Santiago de Compostela, Galicia, Alende played youth football with local Celta de Vigo, signing a new five-year deal on 11 August 2015. He made his senior debut with the B-team on 20 September of that year, starting in a 6–1 home routing of Arandina CF in the Segunda División B championship.

Alende made his first team – and La Liga – debut on 5 December 2015, coming on as a second-half substitute for goalscorer Theo Bongonda in a 1–1 away draw against Real Betis. He resumed his spell at the club mainly with the B-team, leaving on 19 June 2019.

=== Real Valladolid ===
On 4 July 2019, Alende moved to another reserve team, Real Valladolid B also in division three. He made his debut with the main squad the following 22 January, starting in a 1–2 loss at CD Tenerife for the season's Copa del Rey.

==== Loan to Lugo ====
On 20 August 2020, Alende was loaned to Segunda División side CD Lugo, for one year. On 22 July of the following year, he renewed his contract with the Blanquivioletas until 2023 and was loaned to Lugo for a further season.

=== Andorra ===
On 14 July 2022, Alende joined FC Andorra on a two-year contract.
