= Pau López =

Spanish footballer (born 1994)

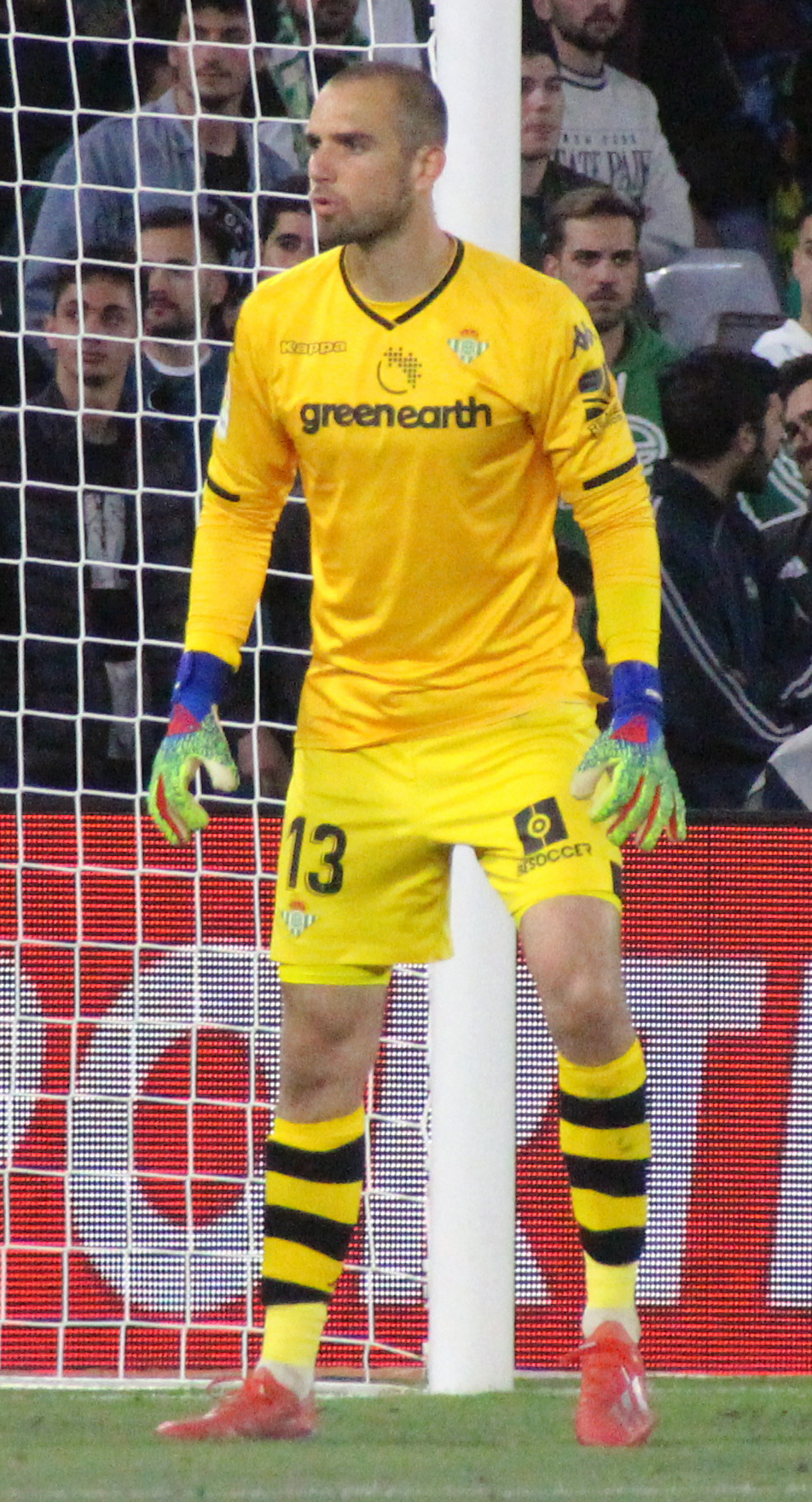
- López playing for Betis in 2019

Personal information
- Full name: Pau López Sabata
- Date of birth: 13 December 1994 (age 31)
- Place of birth: Sant Gregori, Spain
- Height: 1.89 m (6 ft 2 in)
- Position: Goalkeeper

Team information
- Current team: Andorra
- Number: 13

Youth career
- 2002–2007: Girona
- 2007–2013: Espanyol

Senior career*
Years	Team	Apps	(Gls)
2013–2014	Espanyol B	35	(0)
2014–2018	Espanyol	67	(0)
2016–2017	→ Tottenham Hotspur (loan)	0	(0)
2018–2019	Betis	33	(0)
2019–2022	Roma	53	(0)
2021–2022	→ Marseille (loan)	29	(0)
2022–2025	Marseille	66	(0)
2024–2025	→ Girona (loan)	1	(0)
2025	→ Toluca (loan)	11	(0)
2025–2026	Betis	9	(0)
2026–	Andorra	6	(0)

International career
2015–2017	Spain U21	5	(0)
2018–2019	Spain	2	(0)
2015	Catalonia	1	(0)
Medal record
Men's Football
Representing Spain
UEFA European Under-21 Championship
Second place	2017 Poland
- * Club domestic league appearances and goals as of 19:28, 29 September 2026 (UTC)

Pau López Sabata (Catalan pronunciation: [ˈpaw ˈlopeθ]; born 13 December 1994) is a Spanish professional footballer who plays as a goalkeeper for Segunda División club FC Andorra.

He totalled 110 La Liga games over six seasons, with Espanyol, Betis (two spells) and Girona. Abroad, he represented Tottenham Hotspur in England (no appearances), Marseille in France and Toluca in Mexico.

López reached the final of the 2017 European Under-21 Championship with Spain. He made his senior debut the following year.

== Club career ==
=== Espanyol ===
Born in Sant Gregori, Girona, Catalonia, López joined Espanyol's youth setup in 2007 at the age of 12, after starting out at hometown club Girona. He made his senior debut with the former's B team in the 2013–14 season, in the Segunda División B.

On 12 June 2014, López signed a new four-year contract with Espanyol, also being promoted to the main squad. He played his first match as a professional on 17 December, starting in a 1–0 home win against Alavés in the round of 32 of the Copa del Rey and being first choice in the tournament as his team reached the semi-finals for the first time in nine years.

López's debut in La Liga occurred on 1 February 2015, after starter Kiko Casilla was sent off in the 40th minute of the fixture at Sevilla for handling Iago Aspas' shot outside of the penalty area, and he conceded once in an eventual 3–2 defeat. After the latter's departure to Real Madrid in the summer, he became the starter.

On 6 January 2016, during an away fixture against Barcelona in the Spanish Cup, López repeatedly stamped on Lionel Messi after the two players became entangled, in an action that eluded the referee but was caught on camera. On 31 August, he joined Premier League club Tottenham Hotspur on loan for the 2016–17 season, being third choice behind Hugo Lloris and Michel Vorm, he failed to make a single competitive appearance.

After his return to the RCDE Stadium, López continued to start under new manager Quique Sánchez Flores.

=== Betis ===
On 4 July 2018, López signed a five-year deal with fellow top-tier club Real Betis on a free transfer. Under Quique Setién, he missed just five league matches in his only season as the team finished in 10th place.

=== Roma ===
López joined Serie A club Roma on 9 July 2019 on a five-year contract, for a reported fee of €23.5 million. He made his debut on 25 August in a 3–3 home draw with Genoa, making a further 31 appearances by the end of the campaign for the fifth-placed team. On 26 January 2020, he made a mistake in the Derby della Capitale to gift a goal to Lazio's Francesco Acerbi in a 1–1 draw.

In 2020–21, López started as back-up to Antonio Mirante, before returning to the team after the veteran's injury. His season was ended prematurely by a shoulder injury against Manchester United in the semi-finals of the UEFA Europa League.

=== Marseille ===
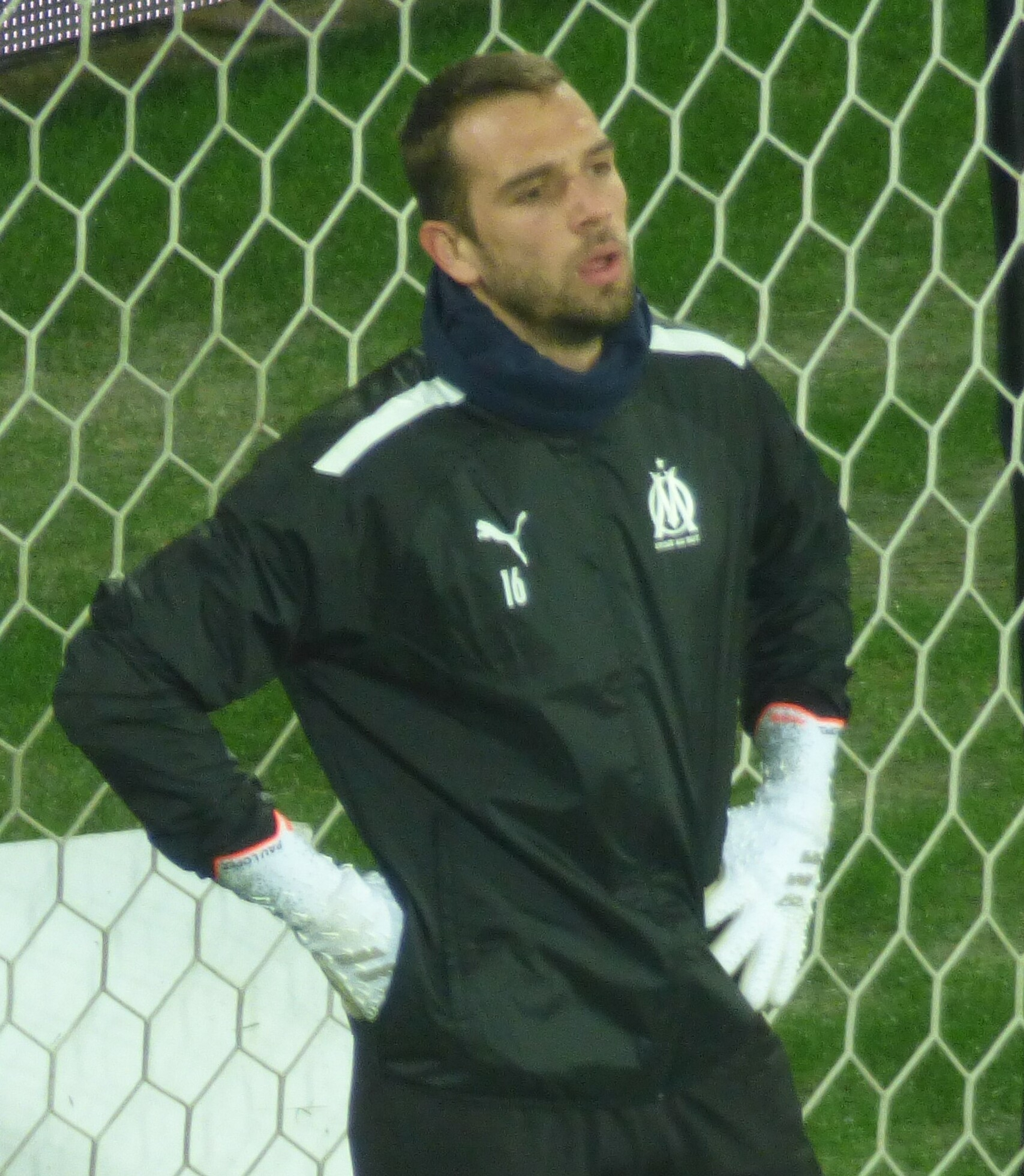
López with Marseille in 2022

On 8 July 2021, López was loaned to Ligue 1 club Marseille for the upcoming season, with an option to buy in the summer of 2022. Facing competition from experienced Steve Mandanda, he made his debut on 11 September in a 2–0 win away to Monaco, and retained his place over the France international throughout the campaign.

Marseille exercised their option to purchase López on 8 January 2022, effective as of 1 July. On 16 August 2024, he was loaned to Spanish top-tier Girona for the season.

On 7 January 2025, López was supposed to join Lens on a six-month deal with an option to buy in July. The following day, however, the loan was called off because, according to the French club, Girona intended to keep the player until the end of the month when they ended their participation in the league phase of the UEFA Champions League.

López signed for Toluca of the Mexican Liga MX on 27 January 2025, still owned by Marseille; he replaced Brazilian Tiago Volpi, who asked to be released for personal reasons.

=== Betis return ===
On 22 July 2025, López returned to Betis after agreeing to a three-year contract. Half of his total appearances in his second spell were made in the Europa League.

=== Andorra ===
On 17 July 2026, having severed his ties to Betis, López signed a three-year deal with Segunda División side FC Andorra with an option for a fourth.

== International career ==
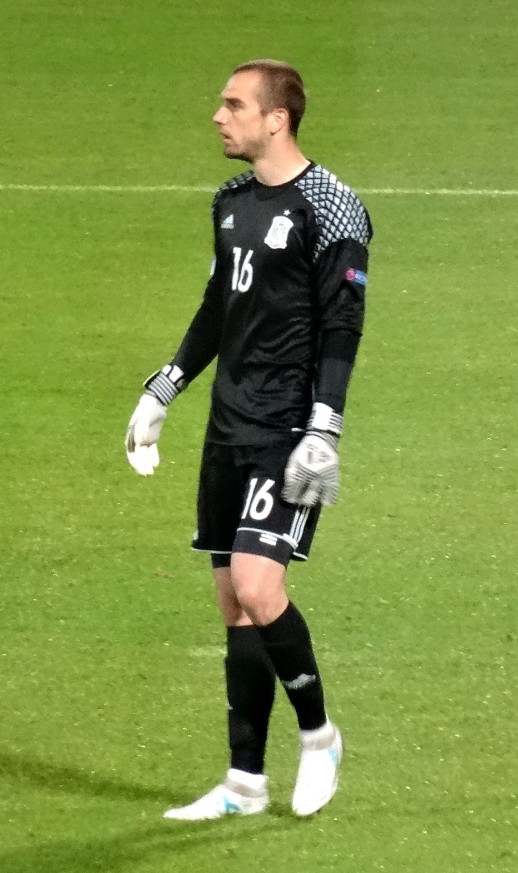
López in action for the Spain under-21 team in 2017

López made his international debut on 26 December 2015, having a player of the match performance for Catalonia in a 1–0 friendly loss to the Basque Country. On 28 March 2016, he played his first game with the Spain under-21 team, in a 1–0 win against Norway at the Estadio Nueva Condomina.

On 17 May 2016, López and Espanyol teammate Marco Asensio were called up to the senior team for a friendly against Bosnia and Herzegovina. He only won his first cap more than two years later, after coming on as a 75th-minute substitute for Kepa Arrizabalaga in a 1–0 win over the same opposition in Las Palmas.

López made his final appearance on 15 November 2019, in a 7–0 home rout of Malta in the UEFA Euro 2020 qualifiers.

== Career statistics ==
=== Club ===
As of match played 26 September 2026

Appearances and goals by club, season and competition
Club	Season	League			National cup (Note: Includes Copa del Rey, Coppa Italia, Coupe de France)		Europe		Total	
Club	Season	Division	Apps	Goals	Apps	Goals	Apps	Goals	Apps	Goals
Espanyol B	2013–14	Segunda División B	35	0	—		—		35	0
Espanyol	2014–15	La Liga	2	0	8	0	—		10	0
Espanyol	2015–16	La Liga	36	0	2	0	—		38	0
Espanyol	2017–18	La Liga	29	0	1	0	—		30	0
Espanyol	Total		67	0	11	0	—		78	0
Tottenham Hotspur (loan)	2016–17	Premier League	0	0	0	0	0	0	0	0
Betis	2018–19	La Liga	33	0	0	0	2 (Note: Appearances in UEFA Europa League)	0	35	0
Roma	2019–20	Serie A	32	0	2	0	8	0	42	0
Roma	2020–21	Serie A	21	0	1	0	12	0	34	0
Roma	Total		53	0	3	0	20	0	76	0
Marseille (loan)	2021–22	Ligue 1	29	0	2	0	5	0	36	0
Marseille	2022–23	Ligue 1	33	0	3	0	6 (Note: Appearances in UEFA Champions League)	0	42	0
Marseille	2023–24	Ligue 1	33	0	1	0	15 (Note: Two appearances in UEFA Champions League, thirteen appearances in UEFA Europa League)	0	49	0
Marseille	Total		95	0	6	0	26	0	127	0
Girona (loan)	2024–25	La Liga	1	0	1	0	1	0	3	0
Toluca (loan)	2024–25	Liga MX	11	0	—		—		11	0
Betis	2025–26	La Liga	9	0	0	0	7	0	16	0
Andorra	2026–27	Segunda División	6	0	0	0	—		6	0
Career total			310	0	21	0	56	0	387	0

=== International ===
Appearances and goals by national team and year
National team	Year	Apps	Goals
Spain	2018	1	0
Spain	2019	1	0
Total		2	0

== Honours ==
Toluca

- Liga MX: Clausura 2025

Spain U21

- UEFA European Under-21 Championship runner-up: 2017

Individual

- UEFA Europa League Squad of the Season: 2020–21
