= Randy Schneider =

Filipino footballer (born 2001)

Personal information
- Full name: Randy Abogado Schneider
- Date of birth: 27 August 2001 (age 25)
- Place of birth: Schaffhausen, Switzerland
- Height: 1.70 m (5 ft 7 in)
- Position: Attacking midfielder

Team information
- Current team: Andorra
- Number: 16

Youth career
- Beringen
- Schaffhausen
- Grasshoppers

Senior career*
Years	Team	Apps	(Gls)
2020–2021	Grasshoppers	4	(1)
2020–2021	→ Aarau (loan)	25	(0)
2021–2022	Aarau	28	(9)
2022–2023	St. Gallen	14	(0)
2023–2026	Winterthur	95	(8)
2026–	Andorra	7	(0)

International career^{‡}
2015–2016	Switzerland U15	4	(1)
2016–2017	Switzerland U16	7	(0)
2017	Switzerland U17	1	(0)
2018–2019	Switzerland U18	2	(0)
2019–2020	Switzerland U19	5	(0)
2020	Switzerland U20	1	(0)
2022	Switzerland U21	2	(0)
2025–	Philippines	7	(1)
- * Club domestic league appearances and goals as of 6 November 2026 ‡ National team caps and goals as of 17:52, 13 July 2026 (UTC)

Randy Abogado Schneider (born 27 August 2001) is a professional footballer who plays as an attacking midfielder for Segunda División club Andorra. Born in Switzerland, he plays for the Philippines national team.

== Career ==
=== Youth ===
Schneider began his career in Switzerland with the youth teams of Beringen, Schaffhausen and Grasshoppers.

=== Grasshoppers ===
==== U21 team ====
In July 2019, Schneider was promoted to the U21 team of Grasshoppers.

==== Senior team ====
In July 2020, Schneider made his debut for the senior team of Grasshoppers in a 4–0 home win against Stade Lausanne. Schneider scored his first professional goal in a 2–1 home win against Chiasso.

==== Loan to Aarau ====
In September 2020, Schneider was sent out on loan to fellow Swiss Challenge League club Aarau. Schneider made his debut for Aarau in a 1–3 home defeat against Wil, coming in as a substitute for Elsad Zverotić in the 67th minute.

=== Aarau ===
After a season-long loan spell at the club, Schneider joined Aarau on a free transfer, signing a two-year deal.

In March 2022, Schneider was named Swiss Football League Player of the Month for the month of February 2022, prevailing against Yanick Brecher of Zürich, Kwadwo Duah of St. Gallen, Asumah Abubakar of Luzern and Jordan Siebatcheu of Young Boys.

=== St. Gallen ===
In June 2022, after his 2-season stint with Aarau, Schneider joined Swiss Super League club St. Gallen for an undisclosed fee. He signed a three-year deal with the club.

=== Winterthur ===
Schneider joined FC Winterthur on 13 June 2023 with a three-year contract.

=== Andorra ===
On 13 July 2026, Schneider signed a two-year contract with Segunda División side FC Andorra.

== International career ==
Born to a Swiss father and a Filipino mother, Schneider is eligible to represent both Switzerland and Philippines at international level. In 2020, it was reported that Schneider was contacted by Scott Cooper, the head coach of Philippines national team regarding playing for the Philippines. He acquired his Philippine passport in early 2025.

=== Switzerland youth ===
Schneider has represented Switzerland at under-16 to under-20 levels.

=== Philippines ===
On 10 March 2025, Schneider was included in the 24-man squad of the Philippines for the 2027 AFC Asian Cup qualification match against Maldives. Four days later, his request to switch international allegiance to the Philippines was approved by FIFA. He made his debut for the Philippines in a 4–1 victory against Maldives. During the match, Schneider scored a goal and provided an assist.

== Career statistics ==
=== Club ===
As of match played 6 November 2026

Appearances and goals by club, season and competition
Club	Season	League			Swiss Cup		Other		Total	
Club	Season	Division	Apps	Goals	Apps	Goals	Apps	Goals	Apps	Goals
Grasshopper	2019–20	Swiss Challenge League	4	1	0	0	—		4	1
Grasshopper	2020–21	Swiss Challenge League	0	0	0	0	—		0	0
Grasshopper	Total		4	1	0	0	—		4	1
Aarau (loan)	2020–21	Swiss Challenge League	25	0	2	0	—		27	0
Aarau	2021–22	Swiss Challenge League	28	8	1	0	—		29	1
St. Gallen	2022–23	Swiss Super League	14	0	2	0	—		16	0
St. Gallen II	2022–23	Swiss Promotion League	3	1	—		—		3	1
Winterthur	2023–24	Swiss Super League	32	5	3	1	—		35	6
Winterthur	2024–25	Swiss Super League	32	1	2	0	—		34	1
Winterthur	2025–26	Swiss Super League	25	2	3	1	—		28	3
Winterthur	Total		89	8	8	2	—		97	10
Andorra	2026–27	Spanish Segunda División	7	0	0	0	—		7	0
Career total			170	18	13	2	0	0	183	20

=== International ===
As of match played 18 November 2025

Appearances and goals by national team and year
National team	Year	Apps	Goals
Philippines	2025	5	1
Total		5	1

Scores and results list Philippines' goal tally first, score column indicates score after each Schneider goal.

List of international goals scored by Randy Schneider
No.	Date	Venue	Opponent	Score	Result	Competition	Ref.
1	25 March 2025	New Clark City Athletics Stadium, New Clark City, Philippines	Maldives	3–1	4–1	2027 AFC Asian Cup qualification	

== Honors ==
=== Individual ===
Swiss Football League Player of the Month: February 2022
