= Hugo López (footballer, born 2007) =

Spanish footballer (born 2007)

Personal information
- Full name: Hugo López Cortés
- Date of birth: 4 March 2007 (age 19)
- Place of birth: Alcantarilla, Spain
- Height: 1.85 m (6 ft 1 in)
- Position: Winger

Team information
- Current team: Andorra (on loan from Villarreal)
- Number: 29

Youth career
- Villarreal
- 2021–2022: Roda
- 2022–2025: Villarreal

Senior career*
Years	Team	Apps	(Gls)
2025–	Villarreal B	34	(3)
2025–	Villarreal	2	(0)
2026–	→ Andorra (loan)	2	(2)

International career^{‡}
2024	Spain U18	3	(1)
2026–	Spain U19	2	(1)
Medal record
Men's football
Representing Spain
UEFA European Under-19 Championship
Winner	2026 Wales
- * Club domestic league appearances and goals as of 24 August 2026 ‡ National team caps and goals as of 15:13, 28 January 2026 (UTC)

Hugo López Cortés (born 4 March 2007) is a Spanish professional footballer who plays as a winger for Segunda División club FC Andorra, on loan from Villarreal.

== Club career ==
López is a product of the youth academy of Villarreal and Roda, and in 2024 signed his first contract with Villarreal until 2027. He debuted with the senior Villarreal team as a substitute in a 6–0 Copa del Rey win over Ciudad de Lucena on 29 October 2025, where he assisted his side's last goal.

On 27 July 2026, López was loaned to Segunda División side FC Andorra until the end of the 2026–27 season. He scored his first professional goals on 24 August, netting a brace in a 4–2 away loss to Celta Fortuna.

== International career ==
López is a youth international for Spain, having been first called up to the Spain U18s for a friendly tournament in 2024. Lopez scored his first goal for the under-19 squad on 1 July 2026, in a 3–0 win over Denmark at the 2026 UEFA Euro Under-19 at Central Park.

== Career statistics ==
As of match played 23 May 2026

Appearances and goals by club, season and competition
Club	Season	League			Copa del Rey		Europe		Other		Total	
Club	Season	Division	Apps	Goals	Apps	Goals	Apps	Goals	Apps	Goals	Apps	Goals
Villarreal B	2025–26	Primera Federación	34	3	—		—		—		34	3
Villarreal	2025–26	La Liga	2	0	2	0	1 (Note: Appearances in UEFA Champions League)	0	—		5	0
Career total			36	3	2	0	1	0	0	0	39	3

== Honours ==
Spain U19

- UEFA European Under-19 Championship: 2026
