= Diego Díaz (footballer, born 2005) =

Spanish footballer (born 2005)

Personal information
- Full name: Diego Díaz Cacho
- Date of birth: 31 May 2005 (age 21)
- Place of birth: Cartes, Spain
- Height: 1.73 m (5 ft 8 in)
- Positions: Attacking midfielder; winger

Team information
- Current team: Andorra (on loan from Racing Santander)
- Number: 22

Youth career
- Racing Santander

Senior career*
Years	Team	Apps	(Gls)
2024–2026	Racing B	60	(11)
2024–	Racing Santander	4	(0)
2026–	→ Andorra (loan)	0	(0)
- * Club domestic league appearances and goals as of 16 August 2026

Diego Díaz Cacho (born 31 May 2005) is a Spanish professional footballer who plays as either an attacking midfielder or a winger for Segunda División club FC Andorra, on loan from Racing Santander.

== Career ==
Born in Cartes, Cantabria, Díaz was a Racing de Santander's youth graduate. On 16 June 2024, after finishing his formation, he renewed his contract with the club,

Díaz made his senior debut with the reserves on 31 August 2024, starting in a 2–0 Segunda Federación home win over UD Llanera. He scored his first senior goal on 17 November, netting the B's fourth in a 5–0 away routing of UM Escobedo.

Díaz made his first team debut on 15 December 2024, coming on as a late substitute for Maguette Gueye in a 1–0 Segunda División home loss to SD Huesca. In March 2026, he agreed to renew his contract with the club until 2029.

Díaz made his La Liga debut on 16 August 2026, replacing Sergio Canales in a 2–2 home draw against Villarreal CF. On 1 September, he was loaned to FC Andorra in the second division until the end of the season.

== Honours ==
Racing Santander

- Segunda División: 2025–26
