= David Sueiro =

Spanish footballer (born 2010)

Personal information
- Full name: David Sueiro Muiños
- Date of birth: 5 August 2010 (age 16)
- Place of birth: Silleda, Spain
- Position: Attacking midfielder

Team information
- Current team: Celta B
- Number: 33

Youth career
- Silleda
- 2021–2023: Xuventude Oroso
- 2023–: Celta

Senior career*
Years	Team	Apps	(Gls)
2026–	Celta B	1	(0)

International career
2024	Spain U15	2	(0)
- * Club domestic league appearances and goals as of 4 October 2026

David Sueiro Muiños (born 5 August 2010) is a Spanish professional footballer who plays as an attacking midfielder for RC Celta Fortuna.

== Club career ==
Born in Silleda, Pontevedra, Galicia, Sueiro joined RC Celta de Vigo's youth sides in 2023, from ED Xuventude Oroso; he was tracked by the club since the age of seven. In August 2026, after attracting interest from FC Barcelona, he signed a professional contract with Celta until 2029.

Sueiro made his professional debut with the reserves on 4 October 2026, coming on as a late substitute for Aldrine Kibet in a 3–2 Segunda División away loss to Sporting de Gijón.

== International career ==
In September 2026, Sueiro was called up to the Spain national under-17 team.
