= Bernard Somuah =

Ghanaian footballer (born 2006)

Personal information
- Full name: Bernard Sarpong Somuah
- Date of birth: 10 February 2006 (age 20)
- Place of birth: Nkawkaw, Ghana
- Height: 1.78 m (5 ft 10 in)
- Position: Winger

Team information
- Current team: Celta B
- Number: 7

Youth career
- Afigya Liberty
- 2023–2025: Asante Kotoko
- 2025: → Celta (loan)

Senior career*
Years	Team	Apps	(Gls)
2023–2026	Asante Kotoko	16	(2)
2024–2026	→ Celta B (lon)	33	(9)
2026–	Celta B	2	(1)
- * Club domestic league appearances and goals as of 24 August 2026

Bernard Sarpong Somuah (born 10 February 2006) is a Ghanaian professional footballer who plays as a winger for Segunda División club Celta Fortuna.

== Career ==
Born in Nkawkaw, Somuah played for Afigya Liberty before signing a three-year contract with Asante Kotoko on 31 August 2023. After making his senior debut with the latter club in the Ghana Premier League, he was loaned to Celta Vigo on 27 August 2024, being initially assigned to reserve team Celta Fortuna.

Somuah only arrived in Vigo in October 2024 due to bureaucratic problems, but was moved down to the Juvenil squad the following January, after failing to make an appearance for Fortuna. Back to Fortuna for the 2025–26 season, he was regularly used until agreeing to a permanent deal until 2030 on 24 February 2026, effective as of July, and scored ten goals during the campaign as the club achieved a first-ever promotion to Segunda División.

Somuah made his professional debut on 15 August 2026, coming on as a second-half substitute for Álvaro Marín in a 0–0 away draw against Cádiz CF. He scored his first goal in the second division nine days later, netting the B's first in a 4–2 home win over FC Andorra.
