= Pablo Gavián =

Spanish footballer (born 2006)

Personal information
- Full name: Pablo Gavián Alonso
- Date of birth: 2 March 2006 (age 20)
- Place of birth: Vigo, Spain
- Height: 1.78 m (5 ft 10 in)
- Position: Right-back

Team information
- Current team: Celta B
- Number: 2

Youth career
- Rápido de Bouzas
- Independiente FC
- 2018–2025: Celta

Senior career*
Years	Team	Apps	(Gls)
2024–	Celta B	56	(2)
- * Club domestic league appearances and goals as of 15 August 2026

Pablo Gavián Alonso (born 2 March 2006) is a Spanish professional footballer who plays as a right-back for RC Celta Fortuna.

== Career ==
Born in Vigo, Pontevedra, Galicia, Gavián joined RC Celta de Vigo's youth sides in 2018, from Independiente FC. He made his senior debut with the reserves on 25 May 2024, coming on as a second-half substitute for Tincho Conde in a 2–1 Primera Federación home loss to FC Barcelona Atlètic.

Gavián established himself as a regular starter for Celta Fortuna in the 2025–26 season, scoring two goals in 36 appearances overall as the club achieved a first-ever promotion to Segunda División. On 4 July 2026, he renewed his contract until 2029.

Gavián made his professional debut on 15 August 2026, starting in a 0–0 away draw against Cádiz CF.
