= Anxo Rodríguez =

Spanish footballer (born 2007)

Personal information
- Full name: Anxo Rodríguez Álvarez
- Date of birth: 10 March 2007 (age 19)
- Place of birth: Torrelodones, Spain
- Height: 1.85 m (6 ft 1 in)
- Position: Centre-back

Team information
- Current team: Celta B
- Number: 20

Youth career
- AJ Lérez
- 2020–2025: Celta

Senior career*
Years	Team	Apps	(Gls)
2025–	Celta B	37	(3)

International career
2026–	Spain U19	7	(0)
- * Club domestic league appearances and goals as of 15 August 2026

Anxo Rodríguez Álvarez (born 10 March 2007) is a Spanish professional footballer who plays as a centre-back for RC Celta Fortuna.

== Club career ==
Born in Torrelodones, Madrid but raised in Pontevedra, Galicia, Rodríguez joined RC Celta de Vigo's youth sides in 2020, from Agrupación Juvenil Lérez. He made his senior debut with the reserves on 24 May 2025, coming on as a second-half substitute for Pablo Meixús in a 2–0 Primera Federación away loss to Real Sociedad B.

Profitting from the injury of Quique Ribes, Rodríguez established himself as a first-choice for Fortuna during the 2025–26 season, scoring three goals in 39 matches as the club achieved a first-ever promotion to Segunda División. He made his professional debut on 15 August 2026, replacing Germain Milla in a 0–0 away draw against Cádiz CF.

== International career ==
On 8 January 2026, Rodríguez was called up to the Spain national under-19 team for a friendly against Italy. He was also included in the squad for the 2026 UEFA European Under-19 Championship, featuring in five of the nation's six matches in the competition as they were crowned champions.

== Honours ==
Spain U19

- UEFA European Under-19 Championship: 2026
