= Quique Ribes =

Spanish footballer (born 2004)

Personal information
- Full name: Enrique Ribes Recaj
- Date of birth: 16 January 2004 (age 22)
- Place of birth: Valencia, Spain
- Height: 1.85 m (6 ft 1 in)
- Position: Centre-back

Team information
- Current team: Celta B
- Number: 3

Youth career
- 2009–2014: Valencia
- 2014–2018: Levante
- 2018–2023: Valencia

Senior career*
Years	Team	Apps	(Gls)
2023–2024	Real Madrid C	22	(1)
2023–2025	Real Madrid B	42	(2)
2025–	Celta B	17	(0)
- * Club domestic league appearances and goals as of 15 August 2026

Enrique "Quique" Ribes Recaj (born 16 January 2004) is a Spanish professional footballer who plays as a centre-back for RC Celta Fortuna.

== Career ==
Born in Valencia, Ribes represented Valencia CF and Levante UD as a youth. In April 2023, he agreed to a deal with Real Madrid, effective as of July.

After making his senior debut with the C-team in Tercera Federación, Ribes subsequently started to feature with the reserves in Primera Federación. He was definitely promoted to Castilla in May 2024, and subsequently established himself as a starter for the side.

On 21 August 2025, Ribes moved to another reserve team, RC Celta Fortuna also in division three, on a four-year deal. A backup to Pablo Meixús and Anxo Rodríguez, he finished the season with 20 appearances overall as the club achieved a first-ever promotion to Segunda División.

Ribes made his professional debut on 15 August 2026, starting in a 0–0 away draw against Cádiz CF.
