= Thomas Carrique (footballer) =

French professional footballer (born 1999)

Personal information
- Full name: Thomas Carrique
- Date of birth: 26 February 1999 (age 27)
- Place of birth: Tarbes, France
- Height: 1.73 m (5 ft 8 in)
- Position: Right-back

Team information
- Current team: Andorra
- Number: 17

Youth career
- 2012–2015: Lourdes
- 2015–2017: Bordeaux

Senior career*
Years	Team	Apps	(Gls)
2017–2020	Bordeaux B	43	(0)
2017–2021	Bordeaux	1	(0)
2020	→ Logroñés (loan)	1	(0)
2020–2021	→ Calahorra (loan)	20	(2)
2021–2023	Celta B	64	(1)
2023–2025	Ponferradina	71	(2)
2025–	Andorra	39	(0)
- * Club domestic league appearances and goals as of 9 June 2026

Thomas Carrique (born 26 February 1999) is a French professional footballer who plays as a right-back for Segunda División club FC Andorra.

== Club career ==
Carrique joined the FC Girondins de Bordeaux academy in 2015 after years of impressing against them with his local club FC Lourdes. He made his professional debut for Bordeaux in a 3–0 Ligue 1 loss to Strasbourg on 8 December 2017, playing the full 90 minutes.

On 25 July 2021, he joined Spanish Primera División RFEF club Celta B. On 12 July 2023, he moved to fellow league team SD Ponferradina.

On 27 June 2025, Carrique joined Segunda División side FC Andorra on a two-year deal.

== Career statistics ==
=== Club ===
As of match played 8 October 2021

Club	Season	League			Cup		League Cup		Europe		Other		Total	
Club	Season	Division	Apps	Goals	Apps	Goals	Apps	Goals	Apps	Goals	Apps	Goals	Apps	Goals
Bordeaux	2017–18	Ligue 1	1	0	1	0	0	0	0	0	—		2	0
Logroñés (loan)	2019–20	Segunda División B	1	0	0	0	—		—		—		1	0
Calahorra (loan)	2020–21	Segunda División B	19	2	1	0	—		—		1 (Note: Appearance(s) in Promotion Playoffs)	0	21	2
Celta B	2021–22	Primera División RFEF	5	0	0	0	—		—		—		5	0
Career total			26	2	2	0	0	0	0	0	1	0	29	2
