= Luismi Redondo =

Spanish footballer

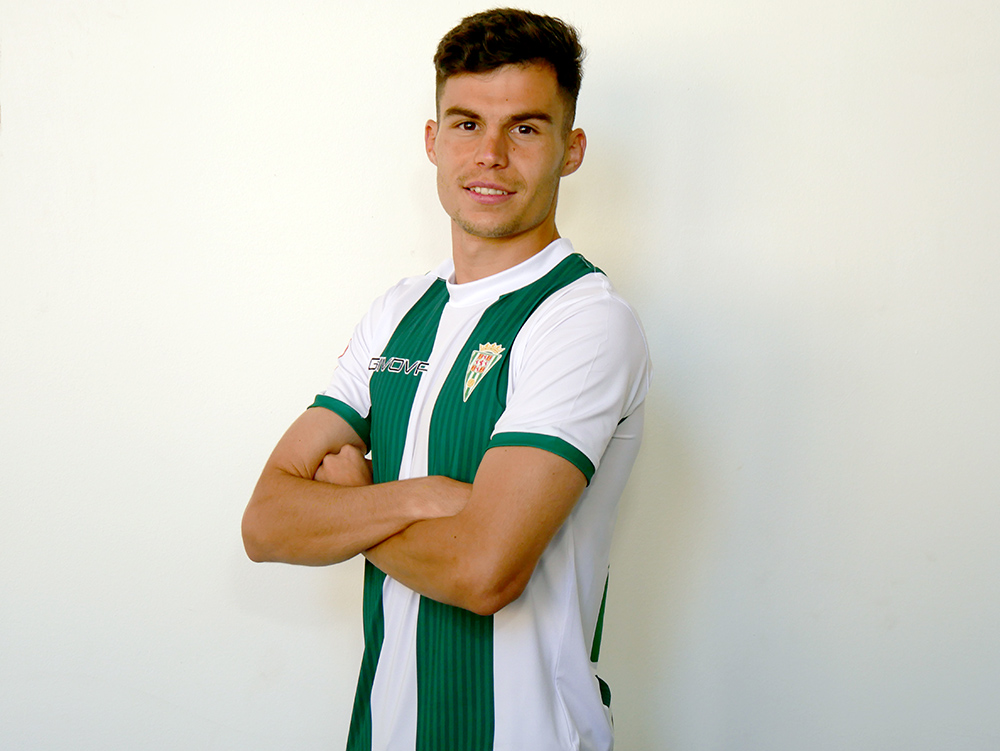

Personal information
- Full name: Luis Miguel Redondo Fernández
- Date of birth: 4 February 1998 (age 28)
- Place of birth: Plasencia, Spain
- Height: 1.72 m (5 ft 8 in)
- Positions: Attacking midfielder; forward

Team information
- Current team: Huesca

Youth career
- 2011–2015: Plasencia
- 2015–2017: Valencia

Senior career*
Years	Team	Apps	(Gls)
2015	Plasencia	3	(2)
2017–2019	Deportivo B	5	(0)
2019	Plasencia	16	(5)
2019–2020	Ciudad Lucena	26	(5)
2020–2021	Córdoba B	10	(7)
2020–2022	Córdoba	42	(11)
2022–2023	Ceuta	26	(1)
2023–2024	Antequera	37	(13)
2024–2026	Andorra	32	(1)
2025–2026	→ Cartagena (loan)	35	(5)
2026–	Huesca	0	(0)
- * Club domestic league appearances and goals as of 10 June 2026

Luis Miguel Redondo Fernández (born 4 February 1998), known as Luismi Redondo or just Luismi, is a Spanish professional footballer who plays as either an attacking midfielder or a forward for SD Huesca.

== Club career ==
Luismi was born in Plasencia, Cáceres, Extremadura, and played for UP Plasencia as a youth before making his first team debut in 2015, as the club suffered relegation from Tercera División. In August 2017, he moved to Valencia CF and returned to youth football.

On 7 July 2017, after finishing his formation, Luismi signed for Deportivo de La Coruña's reserves in Segunda División B. On 31 January 2019, after being very rarely used, he terminated his link with the club, and returned to Plasencia the following day.

In July 2019, Luismi signed for fellow fourth division side CD Ciudad de Lucena. On 29 September of the following year, he agreed to a deal with Córdoba CF, initially as a member of the B-team.

On 2 July 2021, after establishing himself as a member of the first team squad, Luismi renewed his contract with the Blanquiverdes until 2023. On 21 June of the following years, after contributing with eight goals as his side achieved promotion to Primera Federación, he moved to AD Ceuta FC in that division.

On 10 July 2023, Luismi left Ceuta to join fellow third tier side Antequera CF. He scored a career-best 13 goals with the club during the campaign, and signed a three-year contract with FC Andorra in the same category on 13 August 2024, after the club paid his release clause.

Mainly a backup option, Luismi contributed with one goal in 36 appearances overall as Andorra returned to Segunda División at first attempt. On 22 July 2025, however, he was loaned to FC Cartagena, for one year.

On 29 June 2026, Luismi moved to SD Huesca, recently relegated to division three, on a two-year contract.

== International career ==
In January 2025, Luismi was called up to the Spain national under-17 team for a period of trainings.
