= Efe Akman =

Turkish footballer (born 2006)

Personal information
- Full name: Efe Akman
- Date of birth: 20 March 2006 (age 20)
- Place of birth: Şişli, Turkey
- Height: 1.75 m (5 ft 9 in)
- Position: Defensive midfielder

Team information
- Current team: Andorra
- Number: 8

Youth career
- 2016–2024: Galatasaray

Senior career*
| Years | Team | Apps | (Gls) |
| 2024–2025 | Galatasaray | 4 | (0) |
| 2025– | Andorra | 22 | (1) |

International career^{‡}
| 2021–2022 | Turkey U16 | 10 | (0) |
| 2022–2023 | Turkey U17 | 19 | (1) |
| 2023– | Turkey U18 | 6 | (0) |
- * Club domestic league appearances and goals as of 3 June 2026 ‡ National team caps and goals as of 03:58, 14 February 2024 (UTC)

Efe Akman (born 20 March 2006) is a Turkish professional footballer who plays as a defensive midfielder for Segunda División club FC Andorra.

== Club career ==
=== Galatasaray ===
Akman is a youth product of Galatasaray, and worked his way up their youth academy. He won a league title with their U16s. The Serie A club Roma earned his transfer rights as part of Nicolò Zaniolo's move to Galatasaray in February 2023. He made his senior and professional debut with Galatasaray in the Süper Lig as a late substitute in a 3–0 win over Konyaspor on 7 January 2024.

=== Andorra ===
On September 1, 2025, he signed a contract with Spanish Segunda División team Andorra until 2029.

== International career ==
Akman is a youth international for Turkey. He played for the Turkey U17s at the 2022 UEFA European Under-17 Championship.

== Personal life ==
Akman is the son of former Turkish international footballer Ayhan Akman. His brother Hamza also played at Galatasaray. His cousin Ali Akman is also a professional footballer.

== Honours ==
Galatasaray

- Süper Lig: 2024–25
- Turkish Cup: 2024–25
