= Lander Astiazaran =

Spanish footballer (born 2006)

Personal information
- Full name: Lander Astiazaran Escabias
- Date of birth: 7 April 2006 (age 20)
- Place of birth: San Sebastián, Spain
- Height: 1.78 m (5 ft 10 in)
- Position: Winger

Team information
- Current team: Real Sociedad B
- Number: 17

Youth career
- Ostadar
- 2018–2024: Real Sociedad

Senior career*
Years	Team	Apps	(Gls)
2024–2025	Real Sociedad C	35	(4)
2025–	Real Sociedad B	53	(7)
2025–	Real Sociedad	1	(0)
- * Club domestic league appearances and goals as of 9 June 2026

Lander Astiazaran Escabias (born 7 April 2006) is a Spanish footballer who plays as a winger for Real Sociedad B.

== Career ==
Born in San Sebastián, Gipuzkoa, Basque Country, Astiazaran joined Real Sociedad's youth sides in 2018, from lowly Ostadar Saiarre KT. He made his senior debut with the C-team on 13 January 2024, coming on as a late substitute in a 0–0 Segunda Federación away draw against CD Valle de Egüés, and scored his first senior goal with the side on 1 December, in a 2–1 away win over Deportivo Aragón.

Astiazaran started to feature with the reserves during the 2024–25 season, contributing with one goal in 16 appearances overall as the club achieved promotion to Segunda División. He made his professional debut on 17 August 2025, replacing Gorka Gorosabel late into a 1–0 home win over Real Zaragoza.

Astiazaran scored his first professional goal on 7 September 2025, netting the B's first in a 3–3 home draw against Cádiz CF.

== Career statistics ==
As of match played 20 December 2025

Appearances and goals by club, season and competition
Club	Season	League			Cup		Europe		Other		Total	
Club	Season	Division	Apps	Goals	Apps	Goals	Apps	Goals	Apps	Goals	Apps	Goals
Real Sociedad C	2023–24	Segunda Federación	7	0	—		—		—		7	0
Real Sociedad C	2024–25	Segunda Federación	28	4	—		—		—		28	4
Real Sociedad C	Total		35	4	—		—		—		35	4
Real Sociedad B	2024–25	Primera Federación	12	1	—		—		4 (Note: Appearances in 2025 Primera Federación play-offs)	0	16	1
Real Sociedad B	2025–26	Segunda División	17	3	—		—		—		17	3
Real Sociedad B	Total		29	4	—		—		—		29	4
Real Sociedad	2025–26	La Liga	1	0	1	0	—		—		2	0
Career total			65	8	1	0	0	0	4	0	70	8
