= Hugo Solozábal =

Spanish footballer (born 2003)

Personal information
- Full name: Hugo Solozábal Granados
- Date of birth: 7 February 2003 (age 23)
- Place of birth: Madrid, Spain
- Height: 1.87 m (6 ft 2 in)
- Position: Midfielder

Team information
- Current team: Andorra
- Number: 6

Youth career
- 2014–2022: Atlético Madrid

Senior career*
Years	Team	Apps	(Gls)
2022–2023	Las Rozas	24	(1)
2023–2025	Leganés B	69	(14)
2023	Leganés	0	(0)
2025–2026	Getafe B	28	(6)
2025	Getafe	1	(0)
2026–	Andorra	1	(0)
- * Club domestic league appearances and goals as of 15 August 2026

Hugo Solozábal Granados (born 7 February 2003) is a Spanish professional footballer who plays as a midfielder for Segunda División club FC Andorra.

== Career ==
Solozábal was a youth player at Atlético Madrid. Ahead of the 2017–18 season he had the distinction of being one of the first players to perform at the recently built Metropolitano Stadium when he took part in a demonstration with club legends José Eulogio Gárate and Fernando Torres.

Solozábal played for Las Rozas CF in the Tercera Federación for whom he featured 24 times in the 2022–23 season prior to joining CD Leganés in July 2023, being initially assigned to the reserves in the same category. He scored four goals in his first three games for Leganés B at the start of the 2023–24 season.

Solozábal made his senior debut for Lega in the Copa del Rey on 1 November 2023, against AD Llerenense. On 16 July 2025, he signed a one-year deal with Getafe CF, being initially assigned to the B-team in Segunda Federación.

Solozábal made his main squad – and La Liga – debut on 6 December 2025, coming on as a late substitute for Mauro Arambarri in a 2–0 away loss to Villarreal CF. The following 1 July, he agreed to a two-year deal with Segunda División side FC Andorra.

== Personal life ==
He is the son of Spanish former international footballer Roberto Solozábal. His brother Iker Solozábal Granados is a triathlete.
