= Nacho Quintana =

Spanish footballer

Personal information
- Full name: Ignacio Quintana Navarro
- Date of birth: 23 February 2001 (age 25)
- Place of birth: Seseña, Spain
- Height: 1.78 m (5 ft 10 in)
- Position: Attacking midfielder

Team information
- Current team: Andorra
- Number: 19

Youth career
- Atlético Madrid
- 2020–2021: Sevilla

Senior career*
Years	Team	Apps	(Gls)
2020–2023	Sevilla B	67	(7)
2022–2023	Sevilla	0	(0)
2023–2024	Lugo	36	(6)
2024–2026	Eldense	73	(10)
2026–	Andorra	0	(0)
- * Club domestic league appearances and goals as of 10 June 2026

Ignacio "Nacho" Quintana Navarro (born 23 February 2001) is a Spanish professional footballer who plays as an attacking midfielder for Segunda División club FC Andorra.

== Early life ==
Born in Seseña, Toledo, Quintana came through the youth ranks of Atlético Madrid, where he played in the Youth League, scoring several goals and assists in the process.

== Club career ==
Quintana joined Sevilla Atlético on the summer 2020, soon becoming a regular with the Sevillan reserve team and eventually signing a professional contract with the Andalusian club in November 2021, not long after having been called to the first team by Julen Lopetegui.

Quintana made his professional debut for Sevilla FC on 6 January 2022, replacing Lucas Ocampos during a 2–0 away Copa del Rey win against Real Zaragoza. On 1 August of the following year, he moved to CD Lugo in Primera Federación.

On 27 June 2024, Quintana signed a two-year contract with Segunda División side CD Eldense. On 9 July 2026, he agreed to a two-year deal with FC Andorra also in division two.

== Style of play ==
An attacking midfielder, Quintana is able to play both as a winger and a center forward.
