= Aron Rodrigo =

Andorran footballer

Personal information
- Full name: Aron Rodrigo Tapia
- Date of birth: 10 July 2004 (age 22)
- Place of birth: Lleida, Spain
- Height: 1.78 m (5 ft 10 in)
- Position: Winger

Team information
- Current team: Mirandés (on loan from FC Andorra)
- Number: 20

Youth career
- 2018–2019: Bordeta de Lleida
- 2019–2020: Lleida Esportiu
- 2020–2021: Bordeta de Lleida
- 2021–2022: Atlètic Segre
- 2022–2023: Europa

Senior career*
Years	Team	Apps	(Gls)
2022	Atlètic Alpicat	9	(0)
2023–2024	Binéfar	31	(4)
2024–2026	Huesca B	49	(7)
2026–	FC Andorra	0	(0)
2026–	→ Mirandés (loan)	0	(0)

International career^{‡}
2023–2025	Andorra U21	12	(1)
2025–	Andorra	16	(0)
- * Club domestic league appearances and goals as of 8 March 2026 ‡ National team caps and goals as of 15 November 2026

Aron Rodrigo Tapia (born 10 July 2004) is a professional footballer who plays as a winger for Spanish club CD Mirandés, on loan from FC Andorra. Born in Spain, he plays for the Andorra national team.

== Career ==
Born in Lleida, Catalonia, Rodrigo began his career at the age of 14 with hometown side UE Bordeta de Lleida. After representing Lleida Esportiu, he spent one season back at Bordeta before spending the 2021–22 season with Atlètic Segre, aside from debuting as a senior with affiliate side Atlètic Alpicat in Segona Catalana.

On 27 July 2023, after finishing his formation with CE Europa, Rodrigo agreed to a deal with Tercera Federación side CD Binéfar. Roughly one year later, after being regularly used, he joined SD Huesca and was initially assigned to the reserves also in the fifth division.

On 4 July 2026, Rodrigo signed a three-year contract with FC Andorra, but was loaned to Primera Federación side CD Mirandés on 4 August.

== International career ==
After representing Andorra at under-21 level, Rodrigo received his first call-up to the full side on 6 November 2024, for the 2024–25 UEFA Nations League D matches against Moldova and Malta. He made his full international debut on 21 March 2025, starting in a 1–0 FIFA World Cup qualifiiers loss to Latvia.
