= Aimar Duñabeitia =

Spanish footballer (born 2005)

Personal information
- Full name: Aimar Duñabeitia Madariaga
- Date of birth: 26 February 2003 (age 23)
- Place of birth: Gernika, Spain
- Height: 1.84 m (6 ft 0 in)
- Position: Centre-back

Team information
- Current team: Sporting Gijón
- Number: 24

Youth career
- 2014–2015: Gernika
- 2015–2022: Athletic Bilbao

Senior career*
Years	Team	Apps	(Gls)
2022–2023	Basconia	19	(3)
2023–2026	Bilbao Athletic	71	(5)
2026–	Sporting Gijón	1	(0)
- * Club domestic league appearances and goals as of 17 August 2026

Aimar Duñabeitia Madariaga (born 26 February 2003) is a Spanish footballer who plays as a centre-back for Sporting de Gijón.

== Career ==
Born in Gernika, Biscay, Basque Country, Duñabeitia joined Athletic Bilbao's youth sides in 2015, from Gernika Club. He was promoted to farm team CD Basconia in July 2022, and made his senior debut on 10 September, starting and scoring the opener in a 2–1 Tercera Federación home win over CD Aurrerá de Vitoria.

Promoted to the reserves in Segunda Federación in July 2023, Duñabeitia was also called up to the first team to take part of the pre-season. In the following year, he was also regularly used in the pre-season, but suffered an injury in August 2024.

On 8 July 2026, Duñabeitia signed a three-year contract with Segunda División side Sporting de Gijón. He made his professional debut on 17 August, coming on as a late substitute for Emanuel Gularte in a 0–0 home draw against CE Sabadell FC.
