= Carles Manso =

Spanish football manager

Personal information
- Full name: Carles Manso Rubio
- Date of birth: 5 November 1992 (age 34)
- Place of birth: Terrassa, Spain

Team information
- Current team: Andorra (manager)

Managerial career
- Years: Team
- Jàbac Terrassa (youth)
- Sabadell (youth)
- 2016–2017: Sant Andreu (youth)
- 2017–2018: Igualada (assistant)
- 2025: Andorra (assistant)
- 2025: Andorra (caretaker)
- 2025–: Andorra

Carles Manso Rubio (born 5 November 1992) is a Spanish football coach, who is the current manager of FC Andorra.

== Career ==
Born in Terrassa, Barcelona, Catalonia, Manso worked in the youth sides of UFB Jàbac i Terrassa and Sabadell before joining Sant Andreu's Juvenil A squad in 2016, as an assistant. In 2017, he moved to the first team of Igualada in Primera Catalana, also as an assistant manager.

In August 2018, Manso joined the staff of San Cristóbal, as a technical assistant. He left the club in 2020 to join Ferran Costa's staff at Manresa, as a fitness coach, and subsequently followed Costa to Badalona Futur and FC Andorra under the same role.

In January 2025, after Costa's departure and the appointment of Beto Company as manager, Manso became his assistant. On 16 July of that year, he was named Team Manager of the Tricolors.

On 25 November 2025, Manso became the caretaker manager of Andorra, after Ibai Gómez was sacked. He made his professional debut three days later, in a 1–1 Segunda División away draw against Sporting de Gijón.

On 21 December 2025, after leading the club out of the relegation zone, Manso was confirmed as manager of Andorra.

== Managerial statistics ==
As of match played 20 November 2026

Managerial record by team and tenure
Team	Nat	From	To	Record								Ref
Team	Nat	From	To	G	W	D	L	GF	GA	GD	Win %	Ref
Andorra	(Andorra)	25 November 2025	Present	43	16	7	20	69	62	+7	37.21	
Career total				43	16	7	20	69	62	+7	37.21	—
