= Jordi Cano =

Spanish footballer

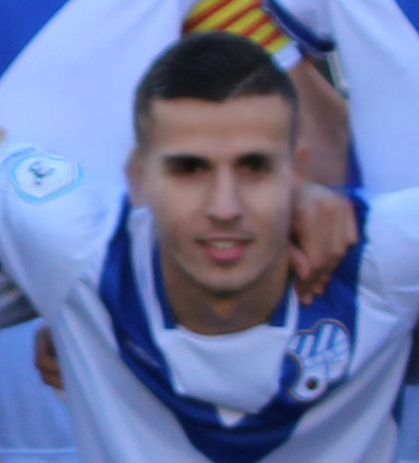
- Cano as a player of Europa in 2020

Personal information
- Full name: Jordi Cano Jiménez
- Date of birth: 1 April 1995 (age 31)
- Place of birth: Barcelona, Spain
- Height: 1.70 m (5 ft 7 in)
- Position: Forward

Team information
- Current team: Andorra
- Number: 15

Youth career
- 2003–2004: Barcelona
- Espanyol
- Cornellà
- 2012–2014: Europa

Senior career*
Years	Team	Apps	(Gls)
2014–2016	Vista Alegre		(11)
2016	Europa	7	(1)
2017	Castelldefels	20	(7)
2017–2018	Prat	26	(4)
2018–2019	Castelldefels	38	(9)
2019–2020	Europa	26	(18)
2020–2021	Badalona	4	(0)
2021	Hospitalet	7	(0)
2021–2022	Europa	15	(3)
2022	Huesca B	17	(8)
2022–2024	Terrassa	55	(12)
2024–2026	Europa	69	(35)
2026–	Andorra	9	(5)

International career^{‡}
2025–	Catalonia	1	(0)
- * Club domestic league appearances and goals as of 26 October 2026 ‡ National team caps and goals as of 18 November 2025

Jordi Cano Jiménez (born 1 April 1995) is a Spanish professional footballer who plays as a forward for Segunda División club FC Andorra.

== Club career ==
Born in Barcelona, Catalonia, Cano played for FC Barcelona, RCD Espanyol, UE Cornellà and CE Europa as a youth. After making his senior debut with Segona Catalana side UD Vista Alegre in 2014, he returned to Europa in June 2016, now for the first team in Tercera División.

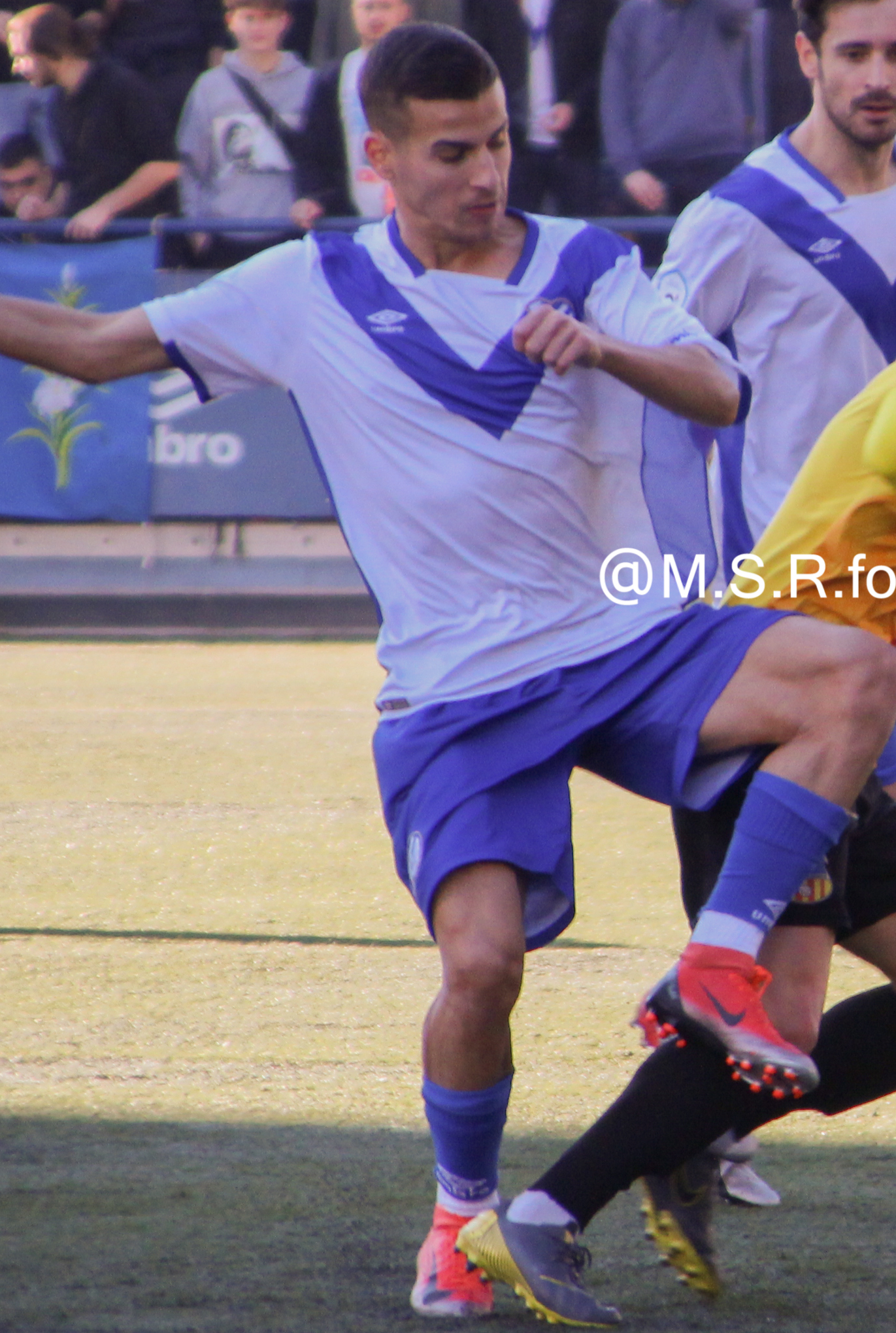
Cano playing with Europa in 2020

Cano left for fellow fourth division side UE Castelldefels on 23 November 2016, before moving to AE Prat in August of the following year. Back to his previous club on 30 May 2018, he subsequently returned to Europa on 24 May 2019.

Cano was the top scorer of the Escapulats during the 2019–20 season, scoring 18 goals, before leaving for Segunda División B side CF Badalona on 24 July 2020. Rarely used, he moved to fellow league team CE L'Hospitalet on 27 January 2021, before again returned to Europa on 18 June 2021, with the club now in Segunda División RFEF.

On 4 January 2022, Cano agreed to a deal with SD Huesca, being assigned to the reserves also in the fourth division. After suffering relegation, he signed for Terrassa FC of the same category.

On 7 June 2023, after scoring 11 goals during the campaign, Cano renewed his contract with the Egarencs for two further years. He rejoined Europa for a third senior spell on 18 June 2024, and scored a career-best during the season as the club achieved promotion to Primera Federación.

After completing an excellent 2025–26 season, during which he was the third division top scorer with 25 goals, Cano signed a two-year contract with Segunda División side FC Andorra on 14 July 2026. He made his professional debut at the age of 31 on 15 August, starting and scoring the opener in a 5–1 home routing of AD Ceuta FC.

== International career ==
On 14 November 2025, Cano and his brother were called up to the Catalonia national team for a friendly against Palestine. He made his international debut four days later, playing the entire second half in the 2–1 win at the Estadi Olímpic Lluís Companys.

== Personal life ==
Cano comes from a family of footballers: his older brothers Àlex and Carlos are also footballers, with the former being a centre-back and the latter being a forward. Jordi and Carlos played together at Prat, and faced Àlex (at the time at Europa) in September 2017, in a match where all three brothers scored.
