= Joel López (footballer, born 2002) =

Spanish footballer (born 2003)

Personal information
- Full name: Joel López Salguero
- Date of birth: 31 March 2002 (age 24)
- Place of birth: Barcelona, Spain
- Height: 1.79 m (5 ft 10 in)
- Position: Left-back

Team information
- Current team: Celta B
- Number: 18

Youth career
- Vila Olímpica
- 2011–2018: Barcelona
- 2018–2022: Arsenal

Senior career*
Years	Team	Apps	(Gls)
2022–2023	Cultural Leonesa	23	(0)
2023–	Celta B	64	(1)

International career
2018	Spain U17	4	(0)
- * Club domestic league appearances and goals as of 15 August 2026

Joel López Salguero (born 31 March 2002) is a Spanish professional footballer who plays as a left-back for RC Celta Fortuna.

== Club career ==
Born in Barcelona, Catalonia, López joined FC Barcelona's La Masia in 2011, from neighbouring CE Vila Olímpica. In June 2018, it was reported that he rejected a renewal offer from the club in order to join Arsenal, with the move becoming official on 23 August and the player signing a scholarship deal.

After playing for the under-18 and under-23 teams of the Gunners, López was an unused substitute in a 1–1 UEFA Champions League home draw against Slavia Prague on 8 April 2021; it was his only experience with the main squad, however. On 5 August 2022, he returned to his home country and signed for Primera Federación side Cultural Leonesa.

On 20 July 2023, López agreed to a four-year deal with Celta Vigo, being initially assigned to the reserves also in the third division. In June 2024, he suffered a knee injury which sidelined him for most of the campaign, returning to action in February 2025 and renewing his link until 2028 on 12 June of that year.

On 6 July 2026, after being regularly used with Fortuna during the season as the club achieved promotion to Segunda División, López further extended his contract until 2029. He made his professional debut on 15 August, starting in a 0–0 away draw against Cádiz CF.

== International career ==
López represented the Spain national under-17 team in 2018.
