= Andrés Antañón =

Spanish footballer (born 2007)

Personal information
- Full name: Andrés Antañón Vieites
- Date of birth: 22 January 2007 (age 19)
- Place of birth: Vigo, Spain
- Height: 1.83 m (6 ft 0 in)
- Position: Midfielder

Team information
- Current team: Celta B
- Number: 8

Youth career
- 2015–2024: Celta

Senior career*
Years	Team	Apps	(Gls)
2024–	Celta B	53	(7)
2025–	Celta	2	(0)

International career^{‡}
2024–2025	Spain U18	4	(0)
2025–	Spain U19	14	(1)
Medal record
Men's football
Representing Spain
UEFA European Under-19 Championship
Winner	2026 Wales
- * Club domestic league appearances and goals as of 24 August 2026 ‡ National team caps and goals as of 23:02, 12 July 2026 (UTC)

Andrés Antañón Vieites (born 22 January 2007) is a Spanish professional footballer who plays as a midfielder for RC Celta Fortuna.

== Club career ==
Born in Vigo, Galicia, Antañón joined the youth categories of hometown side RC Celta de Vigo in 2015, aged eight. On 6 August 2024, he was promoted to the reserves in Primera Federación, and made his senior debut late in that month, starting in a 2–2 home draw against Barakaldo CF.

Antañón scored his first senior goal on 23 March 2025, netting the B's winner in a 1–0 away success over the same opponent. He made his first team debut on 30 October, coming on as a second-half substitute for Hugo González in a 2–0 away win over Puerto de Vega CF, for the season's Copa del Rey.

Antañón made his professional – and La Liga – debut on 1 March 2026, replacing Ferran Jutglà in a 2–1 away win over Girona FC. He scored his first professional goal on 24 August, netting the B's fourth goal in a 4–2 Segunda División home win over FC Andorra.

== International career ==
Antañón represented Spain at under-18 and under-19 levels.

== Personal life ==
Antañón's older brother Lucas is also a footballer and a midfielder. He too was groomed at Celta.

== Honours ==
Spain U19

- UEFA European Under-19 Championship: 2026
