= Sergio Molina (footballer, born 1996) =

Spanish footballer

Personal information
- Full name: Sergio Molina Beloquí
- Date of birth: 18 February 1996 (age 30)
- Place of birth: Madrid, Spain
- Height: 1.77 m (5 ft 9 1/2 in)
- Position: Midfielder

Team information
- Current team: Andorra
- Number: 14

Youth career
- 2004–2005: EF Alcobendas
- 2005–2015: Real Madrid
- 2015–2017: Stoke City

Senior career*
| Years | Team | Apps | (Gls) |
| 2017–2019 | Albacete | 3 | (0) |
| 2017–2018 | → Navalcarnero (loan) | 37 | (0) |
| 2018–2019 | → Salamanca (loan) | 36 | (0) |
| 2019–2021 | Salamanca | 43 | (2) |
| 2021– | Andorra | 176 | (6) |
- * Club domestic league appearances and goals as of 9 June 2026

Sergio Molina Beloquí (born 18 February 1996) is a Spanish professional footballer who plays as a central midfielder for Segunda División club FC Andorra.

== Club career ==
Born in Madrid, Molina joined Real Madrid's youth setup in 2005 at the age of nine, after starting it out at EF Alcobendas. On 4 August 2015, he signed a three-year contract with Premier League side Stoke City, being initially assigned to the under-21 squad.

Molina also appeared with the under-23 squad in the Premier League 2 and in the EFL Trophy. He made his debut in the latter competition on 4 October 2016, starting in a 1–3 away loss against Morecambe.

On 30 January 2017, Molina returned to his home country after agreeing to a two-and-a-half-year contract with Segunda División B side Albacete Balompié. He made his debut for the club on 12 February, coming on as a second-half substitute for Héctor Hernández in a 1–0 home win against SD Amorebieta, and appeared in two further matches as his club achieved promotion to Segunda División.

On 16 August 2017, Molina was loaned to CDA Navalcarnero in the third tier, for one year. On 27 July of the following year, he moved to fellow league team Salamanca CF UDS, also in a temporary deal.

On 23 October 2019, Molina returned to Salamanca on a permanent contract. On 22 June 2021, he moved to Primera División RFEF side FC Andorra, and finished his first season with two goals in 37 appearances overall as the club achieved a first-ever promotion to the second division.

Molina made his professional debut on 15 August 2022, starting in a 1–0 away win over Real Oviedo. He scored his first professional goal on 17 September, netting the opener in a 2–0 home win over SD Eibar.

On 2 June 2023, Molina renewed his contract with the Tricolors until 2025.
