= Iván Rodríguez (footballer, born 2006) =

Andorran footballer

Personal information
- Full name: Iván Rodríguez Martos
- Date of birth: 7 June 2006 (age 20)
- Place of birth: Santpedor, Spain
- Height: 1.71 m (5 ft 7 in)
- Position: Left-back

Team information
- Current team: Huesca (on loan from Andorra)

Youth career
- Santpedor
- Gimnàstic Manresa
- 2016–2019: Barcelona
- 2019–2024: Gimnàstic Manresa

Senior career*
| Years | Team | Apps | (Gls) |
| 2024– | Andorra | 29 | (0) |
| 2025–2026 | → Villarreal B (loan) | 18 | (0) |
| 2026– | → Huesca (loan) | 0 | (0) |

International career
| 2021 | Andorra U17 | 3 | (0) |
| 2023 | Andorra U19 | 3 | (0) |
- * Club domestic league appearances and goals as of 25 May 2026

Iván Rodríguez Martos (born 7 June 2006) is a professional footballer who plays as a left-back for Spanish club SD Huesca, on loan from FC Andorra. Born in Spain, he represents Andorra at youth international level.

== Club career ==
Born in Santpedor, Barcelona, Catalonia, Rodríguez joined FC Barcelona's La Masia in 2016, after representing Club Gimnàstic de Manresa and hometown side CF Santpedor. He left the club in 2019, and returned to Nàstic Manresa, now an affiliate side of FC Andorra.

In August 2024, after playing in the pre-season with Andorra, Rodríguez was promoted to the first team by manager Ferran Costa. He made his league debut on 21 September 2024, starting in a 1–0 Primera Federación away win over Sestao River Club.

On 8 October 2024, Rodríguez renewed his contract with the Tricolors until 2027. He established himself as a first-choice during the season, contributing with 34 appearances overall as the club achieved promotion to Segunda División.

On 6 August 2025, Rodríguez was loaned to Villarreal CF B in the third division, for one year. The following 8 July, he moved to fellow league team SD Huesca also in a temporary deal.

== International career ==
Born in Spain, Rodríguez represented Andorra at under-17 and under-19 levels.
