= Álex Calvo =

Spanish association football player

Personal information
- Full name: Alejandro Calvo Mata
- Date of birth: 20 February 2004 (age 22)
- Place of birth: Córdoba, Spain
- Height: 1.70 m (5 ft 7 in)
- Position: Winger

Team information
- Current team: Andorra
- Number: 7

Youth career
- 2016–2023: Málaga

Senior career*
Years	Team	Apps	(Gls)
2022	Málaga B	1	(0)
2023	Málaga	11	(1)
2023–	Andorra	47	(2)
2024–2025	→ Mirandés (loan)	13	(1)

International career^{‡}
2023–	Spain U19	4	(1)
- * Club domestic league appearances and goals as of 9 June 2026 ‡ National team caps and goals as of 28 March 2023

Alejandro "Álex" Calvo Mata (born 20 February 2004) is a Spanish professional footballer who plays as a right winger for Segunda División club FC Andorra.

== Club career ==
=== Málaga ===
Born in Córdoba, Andalusia, Calvo joined Málaga CF's youth setup in 2016, aged 13. He made his senior debut with the reserves on 8 December 2022, starting in a 0–0 Tercera Federación home draw against UD Torre del Mar.

Calvo made his first team debut on 11 March 2023; coming on as a late substitute for Lago Junior, he scored a late equalizer in a 2–2 Segunda División away draw against UD Las Palmas.

=== Andorra ===
On 4 August 2023, after Málaga's relegation, Calvo was transferred to FC Andorra in the second division, signing a five-year contract; Málaga also retained 20% over a future sale. On 22 August of the following year, after another relegation, he activated a release clause and moved on loan to CD Mirandés.

== International career ==
On 21 February 2023, Calvo was called up to Spain under-19s, scoring on his debut against Norway two days later.
