= Juan Sebastián =

Spanish footballer

Personal information
- Full name: Juan Sebastián Serrano
- Date of birth: 7 February 2002 (age 24)
- Place of birth: Zaragoza, Spain
- Height: 1.87 m (6 ft 2 in)
- Position: Right-back

Team information
- Current team: Andorra
- Number: 2

Youth career
- 2016–2020: Zaragoza

Senior career*
Years	Team	Apps	(Gls)
2020–2024	Zaragoza B	97	(4)
2023–2026	Zaragoza	25	(0)
2024–2025	→ Alcorcón (loan)	28	(0)
2026–	Andorra	0	(0)
- * Club domestic league appearances and goals as of 9 June 2026

Juan Sebastián Serrano (born 7 February 2002) is a Spanish professional footballer who plays as a right-back for Segunda División club FC Andorra.

== Career ==
Born in Zaragoza, Aragon, Sebastián joined Real Zaragoza's youth sides in 2016, aged 14. He made his senior debut with the reserves on 25 October 2020, coming on as a half-time substitute in a 5–0 Tercera División home routing of CD Valdefierro.

Sebastián subsequently established himself as a starter for the B-team, and scored his first senior goal on 23 January 2022, but in a 2–1 away loss to CF Illueca. He helped the B's to achieve promotion to Segunda Federación at the end of the 2021–22 season, and made his first team debut on 14 November 2023, starting in a 2–1 loss at Atzeneta UE, for the campaign's Copa del Rey.

Sebastián made his Segunda División debut on 2 June 2024, replacing Víctor Mollejo late into a 1–1 home draw against Albacete Balompié. On 25 July, he was loaned to Primera Federación side AD Alcorcón, for one year.

An immediate first-choice at Alkor, Sebastián suffered a knee injury in January 2025, but recovered in just one month to regain his starting spot. On 27 June, after returning from loan, he renewed his contract with Zaragoza until 2027, being definitely promoted to the first team.

On 4 July 2026, after suffering relegation, Sebastián agreed to a two-year deal with FC Andorra in division two.
