= Nico Ratti =

Argentine-Italian footballer

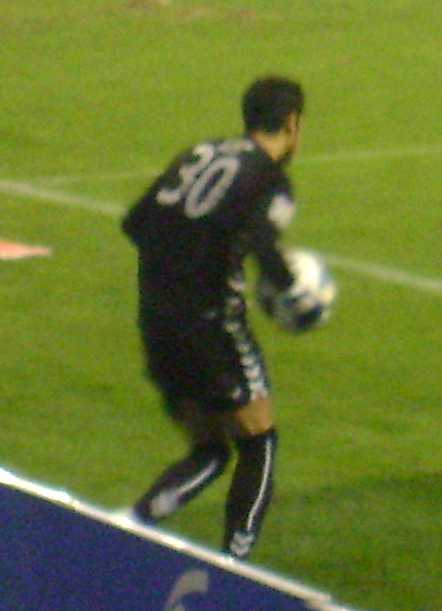
- Ratti playing for Llagostera in 2015

Personal information
- Full name: Kevin Nicolás Ratti Fredes
- Date of birth: 18 September 1993 (age 33)
- Place of birth: Mendoza, Argentina
- Height: 1.78 m (5 ft 10 in)
- Position: Goalkeeper

Team information
- Current team: Andorra
- Number: 1

Youth career
- Huracán San Rafael
- 2004–2005: Principat
- 2005–2011: Andorra
- 2011–2012: Numancia

Senior career*
Years	Team	Apps	(Gls)
2010–2011	Andorra		
2012–2013	Llagostera B	31	(0)
2013–2017	Llagostera	6	(0)
2017–2018	Sant Julià	32	(0)
2019–	Andorra	151	(0)
- * Club domestic league appearances and goals as of 9 June 2026

Kevin Nicolás 'Nico' Ratti Fredes (born 18 September 1993) is an Argentine professional footballer who plays for Segunda División club FC Andorra as a goalkeeper. He also holds Italian citizenship.

== Club career ==
Born in Mendoza, Argentina, Ratti started his career at lowly locals Huracán de San Rafael before moving to Spain in 2005. He immediately joined FC Andorra's youth setup, making his first team debuts in 2010 at the age of just 16.

In the 2011 summer, after having trials at Real Madrid, Ratti joined CD Numancia, returning to youth football. On 12 July of the following year he signed for Segunda División B side UE Llagostera, initially as a backup to José Moragón.

Ratti made his senior debut on 12 May 2013, starting in a 0–1 home loss against RCD Mallorca B. He appeared in his first professional match on 15 October 2015, starting in a 2–1 away win against Real Zaragoza, for the season's Copa del Rey.

On 18 October 2015, Ratti made his Segunda División debut, playing the full 90 minutes in a 3–1 home win against Real Valladolid.

After a spell with UE Sant Julià, Ratti returned to FC Andorra in January 2019.
