= Pablo Meixús =

Spanish footballer (born 2003)

Personal information
- Full name: Pablo González Meixús
- Date of birth: 21 May 2003 (age 23)
- Place of birth: Pontevedra, Spain
- Height: 1.94 m (6 ft 4 in)
- Position: Centre-back

Team information
- Current team: Celta B
- Number: 6

Youth career
- Marcón Atlético
- 2012–2022: Celta

Senior career*
Years	Team	Apps	(Gls)
2022–2023	Bergantiños	23	(0)
2023–2024	Celta C	12	(0)
2023–	Celta B	69	(1)
2025–	Celta	0	(0)
- * Club domestic league appearances and goals as of 15 August 2026

Pablo González Meixús (born 21 May 2003) is a Spanish professional footballer who plays as a centre-back for RC Celta Fortuna.

== Career ==
Born in Pontevedra, Galicia, Meixús joined RC Celta de Vigo's youth sides in 2012, aged nine, from Marcón Atlético. In July 2022, after finishing his formation, he left the club and signed for Segunda Federación side Bergantiños FC.

On 22 July 2023, Meixús returned to Celta and was assigned to the C-team in Tercera Federación. He first appeared with the reserves on 9 December, coming on as a late substitute for Yoel Lago in a 2–0 Primera Federación home win over Cultural y Deportiva Leonesa, and subsequently started to feature more regularly with that side before renewing his contract on 6 June 2025.

Meixús made his first team debut on 30 October 2025, replacing Jones El-Abdellaoui in a 2–0 away win over Puerto de Vega CF, for the season's Copa del Rey. The following 3 July, after helping the B-side to achieve a first-ever promotion to Segunda División as team captain, he further extended his link until 2029.

Meixús made his professional debut on 15 August 2026, starting in a 0–0 away draw against Cádiz CF.
