= Lucas Rodríguez (footballer, born 1999) =

Uruguayan footballer born January 1999

Personal information
- Full name: Lucas Rodríguez Álvarez
- Date of birth: 15 January 1999 (age 27)
- Place of birth: Rosario, Uruguay
- Height: 1.81 m (5 ft 11 in)
- Position: Centre back

Team information
- Current team: Defensor Sporting
- Number: 2

Youth career
- Defensor Sporting

Senior career*
Years	Team	Apps	(Gls)
2019–	Defensor Sporting	1	(0)
2019	→ Rampla Juniors (loan)	17	(0)
- * Club domestic league appearances and goals as of 16:28, 2 July 2020 (UTC)

Lucas Rodríguez Álvarez (born 15 January 1999) is a Uruguayan footballer who plays as a defender for Defensor Sporting in the Uruguayan Primera División.

== Career ==
=== Club career ===
After a successful loan spell at Rampla Juniors with 17 league appearances, Rodríguez returned to Defensor Sporting for the 2020 season.
