= Stefan Golubović (footballer, born 2006) =

Serbian footballer (born 2006)

Personal information
- Date of birth: 17 July 2006 (age 20)
- Place of birth: Belgrade, Serbia
- Height: 1.90 m (6 ft 3 in)
- Position: Forward

Team information
- Current team: Andorra
- Number: 27

Youth career
- FK 011
- 2022–2023: Red Star Belgrade
- 2023–2024: IMT
- 2024–2025: Čukarički

Senior career*
Years	Team	Apps	(Gls)
2023–2024	IMT	4	(0)
2025–	Andorra	1	(0)
2025–2026	→ Cornellà (loan)	24	(5)
- * Club domestic league appearances and goals as of 15 August 2026

Stefan Golubović (born 17 July 2006) is a Serbian professional footballer who plays as a forward for Segunda División club FC Andorra.

== Career ==
Born in Belgrade, Golubović began his career with hometown side FK 011, before joining Red Star Belgrade in 2022. He left for neighbouring IMT in the following year, and made his professional – and Serbian SuperLiga – debut on 21 September 2023, coming on as a second-half substitute for Nikola Krstić in a 1–0 home win over Radnički 1923.

In 2024, after three further first team appearances for IMT, Golubović signed for Čukarički and returned to the under-19 squad. On 1 October 2025, he moved to Spain, joining Tercera Federación side Cornellà on loan from FC Andorra.

In July 2026, after returning from loan, Golubović was called up to the pre-season with Andorra's first team. He was definitely promoted to the main squad on 13 August, and made his club debut two days later, starting in a 5–1 home routing of AD Ceuta FC.
