= Adrià Capdevila =

Spanish footballer (born 2004)

Personal information
- Full name: Adrià Capdevila Puigmal
- Date of birth: 12 January 2004 (age 22)
- Place of birth: Gurb, Spain
- Height: 1.70 m (5 ft 7 in)
- Position: Midfielder

Team information
- Current team: Celta B
- Number: 16

Youth career
- Vic Riuprimer
- 2012–2022: Barcelona
- 2021–2022: → Damm (loan)

College career
Years	Team	Apps	(Gls)
2022	Oregon State Beavers	14	(0)

Senior career*
Years	Team	Apps	(Gls)
2023–2024	Logroñés	9	(0)
2024–2025	Utebo	17	(0)
2025	Getafe B	14	(1)
2025–	Celta B	37	(0)
- * Club domestic league appearances and goals as of 15 August 2026

Adrià Capdevila Puigmal (born 12 January 2004) is a Spanish professional footballer who plays as a midfielder for RC Celta Fortuna.

== Career ==
Born in Gurb, Barcelona, Catalonia, Capdevila joined FC Barcelona's youth sides in 2012, from Vic Riuprmier REFO FC. He notably played alongside Gavi in several youth sides of the club, before being loaned out to CF Damm in 2021.

In 2022, Capdevila moved to the United States to join the Oregon State University, playing college soccer for the Oregon State Beavers. On 21 July 2023, he returned to his home country and signed for Segunda Federación side UD Logroñés.

On 28 June 2024, after being rarely used for the side, Capdevila moved to fellow fourth division side Utebo FC. The following 22 January, he agreed to a two-and-a-half-year contract with Getafe CF, being assigned to the reserves of the same category.

On 28 August 2025, Capdevila moved to another reserve team, RC Celta Fortuna in Primera Federación, after signing a four-year deal. He was regularly used during the season, featuring in 39 matches and scoring once as the club achieved promotion to Segunda División.

Capdevila made his professional debut on 15 August 2026, starting in a 0–0 away draw against Cádiz CF.
