= Marc Domènech (footballer, born 2002) =

Spanish footballer (born 2002)

Personal information
- Full name: Marc Domènech Costa
- Date of birth: 1 November 2002 (age 24)
- Place of birth: Barcelona, Spain
- Height: 1.74 m (5 ft 9 in)
- Position: Midfielder

Team information
- Current team: Andorra
- Number: 10

Youth career
- 2012–2013: Racing Sarrià
- 2013–2014: Damm
- 2014–2020: Barcelona
- 2020–2021: Damm

Senior career*
Years	Team	Apps	(Gls)
2021–2022	Sant Andreu	32	(1)
2022–2023	Girona B	23	(0)
2023–2024	Sabadell	34	(1)
2024–2025	Ibiza	29	(0)
2025–	Andorra	38	(2)

International career^{‡}
2025	Catalonia	1	(0)
- * Club domestic league appearances and goals as of 9 June 2026 ‡ National team caps and goals as of 14:27, 19 November 2025 (UTC)

Marc Domènech Costa (born 1 November 2002) is a Spanish professional footballer who plays as a midfielder for Segunda División club FC Andorra.

== Career ==
Born in Barcelona, Catalonia, Domènech played for FCB Escola (having his first season as a registered player at Racing Sarrià CF) and CF Damm before joining FC Barcelona's La Masia in 2014, aged 11. He returned to Damm in 2020, before signing a one-year deal for Tercera División RFEF side UE Sant Andreu on 14 July 2021.

Despite being regularly used, Domènech left the Quadribarrats on 31 May 2022, after refusing a renewal offer, and joined Girona FC on 1 July, being assigned to the reserves also in the fifth division. On 18 July 2023, he moved to Primera Federación side CE Sabadell FC.

Again a first-choice as the club suffered relegation, Domènech agreed to a one-year contract with fellow third tier side UD Ibiza on 5 July 2024. Mainly a backup option, he departed the club on 23 June of the following year.

On 26 June 2025, Domènech signed a three-year deal with FC Andorra, newly-promoted to Segunda División. He made his professional debut on 17 August, starting in a 1–1 away draw against UD Las Palmas.

== International career ==
Domènech debuted with the Catalonia team in a friendly 2–1 win over Palestine on 18 November 2025.
