= FC Andorra =

Association football club in Andorra

Andorra
- Full name: Futbol Club Andorra
- Nickname: Els Tricolors (The Tricolours)
- Short name: FCA
- Founded: 15 October 1942; 84 years ago
- Stadium: Estadi de la FAF
- Capacity: 5,108
- Owner(s): Gerard Piqué (90%); Cierco Group (10%)
- President: Ferran Vilaseca
- Head coach: Carles Manso
- League: Segunda División
- 2025–26: Segunda División, 13th of 22
- Website: www.fcandorra.com
Home colours	Away colours	Third colours

Futbol Club Andorra is a professional football club based in Andorra la Vella, Andorra, that currently competes in Segunda División of the Spanish league system. The club was founded in 1942 and currently plays its home fixtures at Estadi de la FAF in Encamp. Even though they are based in the microstate of Andorra, the club voluntarily affiliated to the Catalan Football Federation, and as a result, has been allowed to compete in the Spanish league system since 1948.

== History ==
Futbol Club Andorra has historically been the biggest football club in the country. The club was founded on 15 October 1942 in the College of Our Lady of Meritxell and was the first football club to be founded in Andorra. The club joined the categories of the Catalan Football Federation, contesting the Spanish League and Spanish Cup. In the 1963–64 season FC Andorra debuted in the Segunda Regional, finishing in the 11th position.

After several years in regional categories, the Andorran club climbed in 1981 to Segunda División B (third level of the Spanish league system), where they remained for 17 years, with a break in the 1986–87 season when the team played in Tercera División. In the 1988–89 and 1989–90 seasons FC Andorra were close to promotion to Segunda División.

The club's greatest success came in 1994 when FC Andorra won the Copa Catalunya. The Andorran team eliminated FC Barcelona in the semi-finals (aggregate 2–1) and defeated RCD Espanyol in the final played in the Municipal Stadium of Vilassar de Mar, winning 4–2 on penalties after no goals were scored during ordinary and extra time.

At the end of the 1997–98 season the team was relegated to Tercera División (fourth tier).

Their best performance to date in the Copa del Rey was in the 1995–96 edition, beating Palamós CF and Getafe CF before being eliminated by Celta Vigo in Round 16.

From 1986 to 2013 the club also had a futsal section (FC Andorra Futsal) that played in División de Honor and División de Plata.

The Andorran club was bought in December 2018 by Gerard Piqué's Kosmos Holding Group, and in April 2019 presented its main sponsor MoraBanc; a major bank in Andorra. Weeks later they achieved promotion to Tercera División, after a streak of 22 matches unbeaten. In July 2019, the club paid a €452,022 fee to replace CF Reus Deportiu in the Segunda División B after Reus were relegated to the Tercera División for failing to pay its players.

On 20 February 2020, head coach Gabri Garcia was fired from the club. The reason was poor results with 3 consecutive losses and 7 matches without a single victory. On the same day Nacho Castro was appointed as the club's new head coach. On 27 February 2020, one of the biggest business groups in Andorra Pyrénées signed an agreement with the club, becoming its "premium partner".

In 2021 the team qualified for the promotion play-offs to Segunda División for the first time; however, the club was eliminated in the first round by Real Sociedad B. Although, despite this result the team achieved a place in the Primera División RFEF, new league of the third level of Spanish football.

On 21 May 2022, the team was promoted to the Segunda División after beating already relegated UCAM Murcia 1–0 at home, thus getting promoted to the second tier for the first time in their history.

On 26 May 2024, the team was relegated to third division after two years stay in second division following a 0–3 defeat against Real Oviedo. On 21 June 2025, the team were promoted back to the Segunda División, for a second time, after defeating Ponferradina 0–1 in the promotion playoffs second leg, winning the tie 2–1 on aggregate.

== Stadium ==
FC Andorra historically hosted their matches at the Camp d’Esports de les Valls in the capital city of Andorra la Vella before relocating in 1983, to the Estadi Comunal d'Aixovall which, after a renovation in 1999, had a capacity of 1,000 spectators. Following the closure of Aixovall, the club relocated again in 2015 to the new, smaller Centre d'Entrenament de la FAF facility in Andorra la Vella.

More recently the team have been based at the 500-seat Camp de Fútbol de Prada de Moles in Encamp however, since 2021, the club has utilised the 3,306-capacity Estadi Nacional for all home games following an agreement made with the Government of Andorra. The stadium had previously hosted FC Andorra games on a temporary basis in 2015 prior to the opening of the Centre d'Entrenament de la FAF.

On 8 May 2022, a record 3,631 fans attended the team's home match against visiting Albacete Balompié at Estadi Nacional.

In August 2022, following their promotion to the Segunda División, the club announced future plans for a new 6,000-capacity stadium on the site of the existing Camp de Fútbol de Prada de Moles, with an estimated cost of €26 million.

Since the 2022–23 season and with the need to have a natural grass training field to meet the new requirements and demands of the team, Estadi Comunal d'Andorra la Vella has been home to the first team daily. Following an agreement with City Council of Andorra La Vella, the tricolour squad has taken over the municipal facilities, remodelling their interior to convert them into a training centre that meets the new needs.

In June 2025, Andorra moved to the 5,108-seat capacity Estadi de la FAF, in Encamp for playing the Primera Federación play-offs. One month later, FC Andorra agreed on terms with the Andorran Football Federation for using the Estadi de la FAF until May 2026.

== Crest and shirt ==
Traditional crest, used until 2021

FC Andorra's traditional crest, first used in 1948, used the colours and icons of the country of Andorra. It represented the coat of arms of Andorra with some minor variations, featuring the arms of both the Bishop of Urgell and Count of Foix - the two historical Co-Princes of Andorra - along with the arms of the Viscounts of Béarn and Catalonia, two neighbouring territories that Andorra has historically been reliant upon. The traditional crest was updated and amended on several occasions though keeping a very similar and familiar appearance. On 7 July 2021, the club announced a change in its brand image, replacing the traditional crest with the current logo featuring a new round crest in blue with a white pattern representing the name of the club, the country and the mountains characterising the nation. In addition, these elements are encircled by the colours of the Andorran flag.

The club first used red shirts and white shorts as its kit, however this was soon changed in 1948 when they adopted the blue, yellow and red colours of the national flag of Andorra. Historically, the club's kit has often featured the three distinctive colours in the design on the national flag, thus earning FC Andorra the nickname of Els tricolors ('The Tricolours'). From 2019, the club has partnered with the American sports brand Nike to supply the playing kits for the team.

1942	1948	2013	2017-2020	2020-2023	2023-2025	2025-2026

== Honours ==
- Primera Catalana
  - Champions (1): 2018–19
- Copa Catalunya
  - Winners (3): 1993–94, 2022–23, 2023–24

== Seasons ==
Season	Tier	Division	Place	Copa del Rey
1963–64	5	2ª Reg.	11th	
1964–65	5	2ª Reg.	12th	
1965–66	4	1ª Reg.	14th	
1966–67	4	1ª Reg.	3rd	
1967–68	4	1ª Reg.	5th	
1968–69	4	Reg. Pref.	4th	
1969–70	4	Reg. Pref.	20th	
1970–71	5	1ª Reg.	1st	
1971–72	4	Reg. Pref.	4th	
1972–73	4	Reg. Pref.	11th	
1973–74	4	Reg. Pref.	15th	
1974–75	4	Reg. Pref.	7th	
1975–76	4	Reg. Pref.	9th	
1976–77	4	Reg. Pref.	9th	
1977–78	4	3ª	4th	First round
1978–79	4	3ª	5th	Second round
1979–80	4	3ª	1st	First round
1980–81	3	2ª B	11th	Third round
1981–82	3	2ª B	8th	
1982–83	3	2ª B	8th	First round

Season	Tier	Division	Place	Copa del Rey
1983–84	3	2ª B	10th	Second round
1984–85	3	2ª B	9th	Second round
1985–86	3	2ª B	15th	First round
1986–87	4	3ª	8th	
1987–88	3	2ª B	13th	
1988–89	3	2ª B	2nd	
1989–90	3	2ª B	4th	
1990–91	3	2ª B	8th	Fourth round
1991–92	3	2ª B	6th	
1992–93	3	2ª B	10th	Second round
1993–94	3	2ª B	14th	Second round
1994–95	3	2ª B	7th	
1995–96	3	2ª B	9th	Third round
1996–97	3	2ª B	6th	
1997–98	3	2ª B	20th	
1998–99	4	3ª	17th	
1999–2000	5	1ª Cat.	18th	
2000–01	5	1ª Cat.	3rd	
2001–02	4	3ª	20th	
2002–03	5	1ª Cat.	19th	

Season	Tier	Division	Place	Copa del Rey
2003–04	6	Pref. Ter.	18th	
2004–05	7	1ª Ter.	8th	
2005–06	7	1ª Ter.	2nd	
2006–07	7	1ª Ter.	12th	
2007–08	7	1ª Ter.	8th	
2008–09	7	1ª Ter.	5th	
2009–10	7	1ª Ter.	5th	
2010–11	7	1ª Ter.	2nd	
2011–12	6	2ª Cat.	2nd	
2012–13	5	1ª Cat.	8th	
2013–14	5	1ª Cat.	16th	
2014–15	6	2ª Cat.	1st	
2015–16	5	1ª Cat.	8th	
2016–17	5	1ª Cat.	3rd	
2017–18	5	1ª Cat.	9th	
2018–19	5	1ª Cat.	1st	
2019–20	3	2ª B	9th	First round
2020–21	3	2ª B	3rd	First round
2021–22	3	1ª RFEF	1st	Second round
2022–23	2	2ª	7th	Second round

Season	Tier	Division	Place	Copa del Rey
2023–24	2	2ª	21st	First round
2024–25	3	1ª Fed.	4th	Second round
2025–26	2	2ª	13th	Second round
2026–27	2	2ª		TBD

- 4 seasons in Segunda División
- 2 seasons in Primera Federación/Primera División RFEF
- 19 seasons in Segunda División B
- 6 seasons in Tercera División

== Players ==
=== Current squad ===
As of 1 September 2026

Note: Flags indicate national team as defined under FIFA eligibility rules; some limited exceptions apply. Players may hold more than one non-FIFA nationality.

No.	Pos.	Nation	Player
1	GK	ARG	Nico Ratti (captain)
2	DF	ESP	Juan Sebastián
3	DF	ARG	Lautaro Spatz
4	DF	ESP	Gael Alonso
5	DF	ESP	Marc Bombardó
6	MF	ESP	Hugo Solozábal
7	FW	ESP	Álex Calvo
8	MF	TUR	Efe Akman
9	FW	NED	Julian Rijkhoff (on loan from Ajax)
10	MF	ESP	Marc Domènech
11	FW	URU	Lautaro de León
12	FW	ROU	Enes Sali
13	GK	ESP	Pau López
14	MF	ESP	Sergio Molina (vice-captain)

No.	Pos.	Nation	Player
15	FW	ESP	Jordi Cano
16	MF	PHI	Randy Schneider
17	DF	FRA	Thomas Carrique
18	DF	ESP	Andoni López
19	MF	ESP	Nacho Quintana
20	DF	ESP	Martí Vilà (3rd captain)
21	FW	ESP	Moró Sidibe
22	FW	ESP	Diego Díaz (on loan from Racing Santander)
23	DF	ESP	Diego Alende (4th captain)
24	MF	FRA	Théo Le Normand
27	FW	SRB	Stefan Golubović
28	DF	ESP	Tiago Olmedo
29	FW	ESP	Hugo López (on loan from Villarreal)

=== Youth players ===
Note: Flags indicate national team as defined under FIFA eligibility rules; some limited exceptions apply. Players may hold more than one non-FIFA nationality.

No. / Pos. / Nation / Player; 32 / DF / ESP / Jordi Toribio	No. / Pos. / Nation / Player; — / FW / GEO / Saba Samushia

=== Out on loan ===
Note: Flags indicate national team as defined under FIFA eligibility rules; some limited exceptions apply. Players may hold more than one non-FIFA nationality.

No.	Pos.	Nation	Player
—	GK	ESP	Jan Lagunas (at FC Santa Coloma until 30 June 2027)
—	DF	AND	Iván Rodríguez (at Huesca until 30 June 2027)
—	FW	AND	Aron Rodrigo (at Mirandés until 30 June 2027)

No.	Pos.	Nation	Player
—	FW	ESP	Aitor Uzkudun (at Mirandés until 30 June 2027)
—	FW	AND	Berto Rosas (at Logroñés until 30 June 2027)
—	FW	ESP	Bilal Achhiba (at Manresa until 30 June 2027)

=== Current technical staff ===
Position	Staff
Head coach	(Spain) Carles Manso
Assistant coach	(Spain) Antonio José Sánchez
Goalkeeping coach	(Spain) Daniel Ortiz (Spain) Julián Pedernera
Analyst	(Argentina) Franco Gross (Spain) David Vilanova (Portugal) João Duarte
Fitness coach	(Spain) Aitor Yeto (Spain) Dani Murcia
Physiotherapist	(Spain) Pere Tarradellas (Spain) Enrique Agudo (Spain) Ian Lanuza
Rehab fitness coach	(Andorra) Aaron Guirao
Nutritionist	(Andorra) Clàudia Gurí
Doctor	(Andorra) Anna López (Peru) Luis Veneros
Kitman	(Spain) Jordi Collado (Spain) Jonathan Barreal
Team leader	(Spain) Cristian Lanzarote
Player's office manager	(Andorra) Bufa

Last updated: 1 September 2026
Source: FC Andorra Coaching staff

== Former coaches ==
- 1979–1983: (Spain) Vicente Dauder
- 1983–1984: (Spain) Luis Aloy
- 1990–1991: (Spain) Vicente Dauder
- 1993–1994: (Spain) Xavi Agustí
- 1994–1996: (Spain) Peio Bengoetxea
- 1996–1997: (Spain) Juanjo Díaz
- 2000–2002: (Spain) Emilio Larraz
- 2004–2006: (Spain) Lluís Miquel Aloy
- 2008–2011: (Andorra) Richard Imbernón
- 2011–2016: (Andorra) Justo Ruiz
- 2016–2017: (Spain) Emili Vicente
- 2017: (Andorra) Eloy Casals (interim)
- 2017: (Spain) Marc Castellsagué
- 2018: (Andorra) Eloy Casals (interim)
- 2018: (Spain) Candi Viladrich
- 2018: (Andorra) Richard Imbernón
- 2018–2020: (Spain) Gabri
- 2020–2021: (Spain) Nacho Castro
- 2021–2024: (Spain) Eder Sarabia
- 2024–2025: (Spain) Ferran Costa
- 2025: (Spain) Beto Company
- 2025: (Spain) Ibai Gómez
- 2025–: (Spain) Carles Manso

== See also ==
- FC Andorra Futsal
