= RC Celta Fortuna =

Spanish association football club

Celta Fortuna
- Full name: Real Club Celta de Vigo Fortuna
- Nickname: Os Celestes (The Sky Blues)
- Founded: 1927; 99 years ago
- Stadium: Balaídos
- Capacity: 24,870
- President: Marián Mouriño
- Head coach: Fredi Álvarez
- League: Segunda División
- 2025–26: Primera Federación – Group 1, 2nd of 20 (promoted via play-offs)
- Website: rccelta.es/en/equipos/celta-fortuna/
Home colours	Away colours	Third colours

Real Club Celta de Vigo Fortuna or simply Celta Fortuna is a Spanish football team based in Vigo, Pontevedra, in the autonomous community of Galicia. Founded in 1927, it is the reserve team of Celta Vigo and competes in the Segunda División, the second tier of Spanish football. They play their home games at the Balaídos Stadium.

Reserve teams in Spain play in the same league system as their senior team rather than a separate league. Reserve teams, however, cannot play in the same division as their senior team. Therefore, Celta Fortuna are ineligible for promotion to the La Liga as long as Celta Vigo plays there. Consequently, they must play at least one level below their main side and they are not eligible to play in the Copa del Rey. In addition, only under-23 players, or under-25 players with a professional contract, can switch between senior and reserve teams.

== History ==
The club was founded in 1927 as Turista Sport Club. In the late 1980s, a merger with Gran Peña FC was proposed, but eventually Turista was taken over by Celta de Vigo in 1989 and renamed Celta Turista.

In the 1988–89 season, Club Turista played in the Regional Preferente, the fifth tier of Spanish football, and finished in first place with 57 points. It first competed in the third division in 1992–93, being relegated the following campaign. In 1995, in order to comply with the new Royal Spanish Football Federation regulations, the club changed its denomination to the Celta de Vigo B. In the 1996–97 season, the club finished in 19th place in Segunda División B and relegated back to the fourth division.

In the 2018–19 season, Celta B came close to relegation, but retained their place in Segunda División B after finishing 16th out of 20 teams. In March 2023, the club changed its name to Celta Fortuna in honour of Celta's predecessor club Real Fortuna FC.

Celta Fortuna achieved its first-ever promotion to the second tier Segunda División at the end of the 2025–26 season, after defeating SD Ponferradina in the play-off finals.

=== Club background ===
- Turista Sport Club (1927–1941)
- Club Deportivo Turista (1941–1946)
- Turista Sociedad Cultural (1946–1957)
- Club Turista (1957–1989)
- Club Celta Turista (1989–1995)
- Celta de Vigo B (1995–2023)
- Celta de Vigo Fortuna (2023–present)

== Season-by-season record ==
As an independent club

Season	Tier	Division	Place	Copa del Rey
1943–44	4	Serie A	1st	First round
1944–45	3	3ª	3rd	
1945–46	3	3ª	6th	
1946–47	3	3ª	10th	
1947–48	4	Serie A	1st	
1948–49	4	Serie A	3rd	
1949–50	4	Serie A	1st	
1950–51	4	Serie A	1st	
1951–52	4	Serie A	1st	
1952–53	4	Serie A	1st	
1953–54	3	3ª	4th	
1954–55	3	3ª	6th	
1955–56	3	3ª	2nd	
1956–57	3	3ª	2nd	
1957–58	3	3ª	1st	
1958–59	3	3ª	2nd	
1959–60	3	3ª	4th	
1960–61	3	3ª	3rd	
1961–62	3	3ª	7th	
1962–63	3	3ª	6th	
1963–64	3	3ª	6th	
1964–65	3	3ª	13th	
1965–66	3	3ª	9th	

Season	Tier	Division	Place	Copa del Rey
1966–67	3	3ª	8th	
1967–68	3	3ª	11th	
1968–69	4	Serie A	1st	
1969–70	3	3ª	14th	
1970–71	4	Serie A	6th	
1971–72	4	Serie A	2nd	
1972–73	4	Serie A	4th	
1973–74	4	Serie A	3rd	
1974–75	4	Serie A	4th	
1975–76	4	Serie A	3rd	
1976–77	4	Serie A	3rd	
1977–78	4	3ª	17th	
1978–79	4	3ª	10th	Second round
1979–80	4	3ª	13th	Second round
1980–81	4	3ª	16th	
1981–82	4	3ª	6th	
1982–83	4	3ª	12th	First round
1983–84	4	3ª	12th	
1984–85	4	3ª	18th	
1985–86	4	3ª	19th	
1986–87	5	Reg. Pref.	7th	
1987–88	5	Reg. Pref.	14th	
1988–89	5	Reg. Pref.	1st	

As a reserve team of Celta de Vigo

Season	Tier	Division	Place
1989–90	4	3ª	9th
1990–91	4	3ª	6th
1991–92	4	3ª	2nd
1992–93	3	2ª B	15th
1993–94	3	2ª B	20th
1994–95	4	3ª	3rd
1995–96	4	3ª	3rd
1996–97	3	2ª B	19th
1997–98	4	3ª	3rd
1998–99	4	3ª	3rd
1999–2000	4	3ª	1st
2000–01	4	3ª	1st
2001–02	3	2ª B	13th
2002–03	3	2ª B	14th
2003–04	3	2ª B	3rd
2004–05	3	2ª B	8th
2005–06	3	2ª B	15th
2006–07	3	2ª B	13th
2007–08	3	2ª B	8th
2008–09	3	2ª B	5th

Season	Tier	Division	Place
2009–10	3	2ª B	9th
2010–11	3	2ª B	9th
2011–12	3	2ª B	20th
2012–13	4	3ª	2nd
2013–14	3	2ª B	18th
2014–15	3	2ª B	13th
2015–16	3	2ª B	11th
2016–17	3	2ª B	3rd
2017–18	3	2ª B	4th
2018–19	3	2ª B	16th
2019–20	3	2ª B	14th
2020–21	3	2ª B	1st / 2nd
2021–22	3	1ª RFEF	6th
2022–23	3	1ª Fed.	5th
2023–24	3	1ª Fed.	4th
2024–25	3	1ª Fed.	8th
2025–26	3	1ª Fed.	2nd
2026–27	2	2ª	

- 1 season in Segunda División
- 5 seasons in Primera Federación/Primera División RFEF
- 22 seasons in Segunda División B
- 38 seasons in Tercera División
- 18 seasons in Galician regional divisions

== Current squad ==
As of 14 September 2026

Note: Flags indicate national team as defined under FIFA eligibility rules; some limited exceptions apply. Players may hold more than one non-FIFA nationality.

No.	Pos.	Nation	Player
1	GK	ESP	Coke Carrillo
2	DF	ESP	Pablo Gavián
3	DF	ESP	Quique Ribes
4	DF	SEN	Seyni Mbaye Ndiaye
5	MF	ESP	Hugo Burcio
6	DF	ESP	Pablo Meixús (captain)
7	FW	GHA	Bernard Somuah
8	MF	ESP	Andrés Antañón
9	FW	ESP	Álvaro Marín
10	FW	ESP	Óscar Marcos
11	FW	ESP	Ángel Arcos
13	GK	BRA	Caio Barone
14	DF	ESP	Jan Oliveras

No.	Pos.	Nation	Player
15	FW	KEN	Aldrine Kibet
16	MF	ESP	Adrià Capdevila
17	MF	PAR	Hugo Cuenca (on loan from Genoa)
18	DF	ESP	Joel López
19	FW	ESP	Ángel Davila
20	DF	ESP	Anxo Rodríguez
21	DF	ESP	Alexis Olmedo
22	MF	ESP	Stefan Bajcetic
23	DF	CMR	Germain Milla
25	GK	ESP	Marcos González
39	FW	MAR	Jones El-Abdellaoui
—	DF	UAE	Anthony Khayat

=== Youth team ===
Note: Flags indicate national team as defined under FIFA eligibility rules; some limited exceptions apply. Players may hold more than one non-FIFA nationality.

No.	Pos.	Nation	Player
26	FW	ESP	Jorge Pérez-Lafuente
27	MF	ESP	Noah Rodríguez
28	FW	POR	Vlad (on loan from Paços de Ferreira)
29	MF	ESP	Mateo Sobral

No.	Pos.	Nation	Player
31	DF	ESP	Raúl Chirveches
32	MF	ESP	Hugo López
33	MF	ESP	David Sueiro

=== Out on loan ===
Note: Flags indicate national team as defined under FIFA eligibility rules; some limited exceptions apply. Players may hold more than one non-FIFA nationality.

No.	Pos.	Nation	Player
—	DF	ESP	Xandre Fraga (at Arosa until 30 June 2027)
—	FW	ESP	Cristian Carro (at UD Ourense until 30 June 2027)

== Honours ==
- Tercera División: 1957–58, 1999–2000, 2000–01
- Copa Federación de España: 2001–02
