= 2023–24 FC Cartagena season =

FC Cartagena
2023–24 season
- President: Paco Belmonte
- Head coach: Víctor Sánchez (until 23 September); Julián Calero (from 25 September)
- Stadium: Cartagonova
- Segunda División: 16th
- Copa del Rey: Second round
colours	colours	colours
- All statistics correct as of 1 November 2023.

The 2023–24 season is Fútbol Club Cartagena's 29th season in existence and fourth consecutive in the Segunda División, the second division of association football in Spain. They will also compete in the Copa del Rey.

== Players ==
=== First-team squad ===
As of 6 February 2024

Note: Flags indicate national team as defined under FIFA eligibility rules; some limited exceptions apply. Players may hold more than one non-FIFA nationality.

No.	Pos.	Nation	Player
1	GK	ESP	Tomás Mejías
2	DF	ESP	Diego Moreno (on loan from Osasuna)
4	DF	ESP	Pedro Alcalá (captain)
5	DF	ESP	Gonzalo Verdú
6	MF	ESP	Andy Rodríguez
8	MF	ESP	Luis Muñoz
9	FW	ESP	Alfredo Ortuño (vice-captain)
10	FW	ESP	Darío Poveda (on loan from Getafe)
11	FW	ESP	Juan Carlos Real
12	FW	COL	Juanjo Narváez
13	GK	ESP	Raúl Lizoain (on loan from Andorra)

No.	Pos.	Nation	Player
14	DF	ESP	José Fontán (on loan from Celta)
16	DF	ESP	Iván Calero
17	MF	ESP	Mikel Rico
18	MF	ARG	Damián Musto
20	DF	ESP	Jairo Izquierdo
22	DF	ESP	Kiko Olivas
23	MF	CHI	Tomás Alarcón (on loan from Cádiz)
26	FW	ESP	Arnau Ortiz (on loan from Girona)
27	GK	ESP	José Saldaña
33	DF	ESP	Arnau Solà (on loan from Almería)

=== Reserve team ===
Note: Flags indicate national team as defined under FIFA eligibility rules; some limited exceptions apply. Players may hold more than one non-FIFA nationality.

No.	Pos.	Nation	Player
31	DF	ESP	Carlos Sánchez
32	MF	ESP	Jony Álamo
34	DF	ESP	Fromsa
35	FW	ESP	Iván Ayllón
36	MF	CIV	Djakaría Barro
38	DF	ESP	David Guerrero

No.	Pos.	Nation	Player
39	DF	ESP	Diego de Pedro
40	DF	ESP	Mario Climent
41	FW	GUI	Mamadou Cellou
45	GK	ESP	Nono Gómez
47	DF	ESP	Juan Carlos Sabater
48	GK	ECU	Jhafets Reyes

=== Out on loan ===
Note: Flags indicate national team as defined under FIFA eligibility rules; some limited exceptions apply. Players may hold more than one non-FIFA nationality.

No.	Pos.	Nation	Player
—	FW	SWE	Isak Jansson (at Rapid Wien until 30 June 2024)

== Transfers ==
=== In ===
Pos.	Player	Transferred from	Fee	Date	Source
DF	(Spain) Arnau Solà	(Spain) Almería	Loan	20 July 2023	
DF	(Spain) José Fontán	(Spain) Celta Vigo	Loan	21 August 2023	
GK	(Spain) Raúl Lizoain	(Spain) Andorra	Loan	23 August 2023	
MF	(Colombia) Juanjo Narváez	(Spain) Valladolid	Free	23 August 2023	
MF	(Chile) Tomás Alarcón	(Spain) Cádiz	Loan	23 August 2023	

=== Out ===
Pos.	Player	Transferred to	Fee	Date	Source
GK	(Spain) Aarón Escandell	(Spain) Las Palmas	€400,000	24 July 2023	
MF	(Spain) Neskes	(Spain) Ibiza	Free	21 August 2023	

== Pre-season and friendlies ==
Win Draw Loss Fixtures

14 July 2023 Friendly	Cartagena	1–2	Birmingham City	San Pedro del Pinatar
20:00 UTC+2	Dde Pedro 52'	Report	James 5'; T. Roberts 34'	Stadium: Pinatar Arena Football Center

19 July 2023 Friendly	Cartagena	0–1	Damac	San Pedro del Pinatar
20:00 UTC+2		Report	Chafaï 25' (pen.)	Stadium: Pinatar Arena Football Center

22 July 2023 Friendly	Cartagena	1–0	Elche	Granada
09:30 UTC+2	Ortuño 45+4'	Report		Stadium: Ciudad Deportiva del Granada CF

26 July 2023 Memorial Alfonso García Zapata	Águilas	0–0 (4–3 p)	Cartagena	Águilas
20:00 UTC+2		Report		Stadium: Estadio El Rubial; Referee: Sánchez Villalobos

28 July 2023 Friendly	Cartagena	1–2	Zaragoza	San Pedro del Pinatar
20:00 UTC+2	Ortuño 16'	Report	Puche 12'; Moya 80'	Stadium: Pinatar Arena Football Center

5 August 2023 51st Carabela de Plata Trophy	Cartagena	3–1	Real Murcia	Cartagena
21:00 UTC+2	Cairo 3'; Ortuño 19', 43'; Datković (red card) 45+3'; Musto (red card) 45+4'	Report	Rodri (red card) 44'; Vega 86'	Stadium: Cartagonova; Referee: Jorge Díaz Escudero

== Competitions ==
=== Overall record ===
Competition	First match	Last match	Starting round	Final position	Record							
Competition	First match	Last match	Starting round	Final position	Pld	W	D	L	GF	GA	GD	Win %
Segunda División	13 August 2023	May 2024	Matchday 1		32	10	8	14	31	42	−11	31.25
Copa del Rey	1 November 2023	6 December 2023	First round	Second round	2	0	2	0	0	0	+0	0.00
Total					34	10	10	14	31	42	−11	29.41

Last updated: 24 March 2024
Source: Soccerway

=== Segunda División ===
==== League table ====
Pos	Team	Pld	W	D	L	GF	GA	GD	Pts
12	Tenerife	42	15	11	16	38	41	−3	56
13	Albacete	42	12	15	15	50	56	−6	51 (Note: Albacete finished ahead of Cartagena and Zaragoza on head-to-head points: Albacete 6 pts, Cartagena 5 pts, Zaragoza 4 pts)
14	Cartagena	42	14	9	19	37	51	−14	51
15	Zaragoza	42	12	15	15	42	42	0	51
16	Eldense	42	12	14	16	46	56	−10	50

Updated to match(es) played on 2 Jun 2024. Source: LaLiga HyperMotion
Rules for classification: 1) Points; 2) Head-to-head points; 3) Head-to-head goal difference; 4) Goal difference; 5) Goals scored; 6) Fair-play points
(Note: Head-to-head record is used only after all the matches between the teams in question have been played)

==== Results summary ====
Overall								Home						Away					
Pld	W	D	L	GF	GA	GD	Pts	W	D	L	GF	GA	GD	W	D	L	GF	GA	GD
42	14	9	19	37	51	−14	51	9	1	11	20	26	−6	5	8	8	17	25	−8

Source: LALIGA HYPERMOTION

==== Results by round ====
Round	1	2	3	4	5	6	7	8	9	10	11	12	13	14	15	16	17	18	19	20	21	22	23	24	25	26	27	28	29	30	31	32	33
Ground	H	A	H	A	H	A	H	A	H	A	H	A	A	H	A	H	A	H	A	H	A	H	A	H	A	H	A	H	A	H	A	H	
Result	L	L	L	W	L	L	L	D	L	D	L	D	L	L	D	D	D	W	W	L	L	W	W	W	D	W	W	L	L	W	D	W	
Position	18	20	22	18	20	22	22	22	22	22	22	22	22	22	22	22	22	22	20	22	22	21	21	20	18	17	16	18	18	17	17	16	

Updated to match(es) played on 2 December 2023. Source: LALIGA HYPERMOTION
A = Away; H = Home; W = Win; D = Draw; L = Loss

==== Matches ====
The league fixtures were unveiled on 28 June 2023.

13 August 2023 1	Cartagena	0–1	Eldense	Cartagena
19:30 CEST (UTC+2)	Muñoz (yellow card) 75'	Report	Timor (yellow card) 36'; Juanto 41'	Stadium: Cartagonova; Referee: Miguel Sesma Espinosa

18 August 2023 2	Andorra	3–2	Cartagena	Andorra la Vella
19:00 CEST (UTC+2)	Petxarroman (yellow card) 20'; Orellana (yellow card) 38'; Nieto 56', 64', 79' (pen.)	Report	Hevel (yellow card) 14'; Ortuño (yellow card) 21', (goal) 72' (pen.); Musto (yellow card) 77'; Jansson (yellow card) 84'; Descalzo 90+4'	Stadium: Estadi Nacional; Referee: Álvaro Moreno Aragón

25 August 2023 3	Cartagena	0–1	Levante	Cartagena
21:30 CEST (UTC+2)	Musto (yellow card) 56'; Sánchez (yellow card) 62'; Jansson (yellow card) 71'; Real (yellow card) 73'	Report	Kochorashvili 25', (yellow card) 37'; Cantero (yellow card) 54'; Postigo (yellow card) 64'; Muñoz (yellow card) 80'; Bouldini (yellow card) 80'; Álvarez (yellow card) 90+4'	Stadium: Cartagonova; Attendance: 7,243; Referee: Adrián Cordero Vega

2 September 2023 4	Villarreal B	1–2	Cartagena	Villarreal
21:00 CEST (UTC+2)	Forés 8'	Report	Ayllón 71'; Ortuño 74'	Stadium: Estadio de la Cerámica; Attendance: 1,522; Referee: Iosu Galech Apezteguía

10 September 2023 5	Cartagena	1–3	Zaragoza	Cartagena
18:30 CEST (UTC+2)	Solà 31'	Report	Vallejo 16'; Alcalá 39' (o.g.); Mollejo 90+2'	Stadium: Cartagonova; Referee: Saúl Ais Reig

16 September 2023 6	Valladolid	1–0	Cartagena	Valladolid
18:30 CEST (UTC+2)	Monchu (yellow card) 10'; Sylla (yellow card) 22'; Escudero (yellow card) 63'; Cédric 90'	Report	Fontán (yellow card) 4'	Stadium: Estadio José Zorrilla; Attendance: 16,138; Referee: Raúl Martín González Francés

22 September 2023 7	Cartagena	1–2	Eibar	Cartagena
21:00 CEST (UTC+2)	Real 47'; Izquierdo (red card) 57'; Muñoz (yellow card) 58'; Embaló (yellow card) 86'	Report	Cédric 24'; Stoichkov (yellow card) 27', (goal) 65'; Álvarez (yellow card) 56'; Soriano (yellow card) 71'; Corpas (yellow card) 73'; Vencedor (yellow card) 89'	Stadium: Cartagonova; Referee: Alejandro Quintero González

1 October 2023 8	Amorebieta	0–0	Cartagena	Lezama
18:30 CEST (UTC+2)		Report		Stadium: Instalaciones de Lezama Campo 2 Attendance: 1,141; Referee: Óliver de la Fuente Ramos

5 October 2023 9	Cartagena	0–2	Espanyol	Cartagena
21:30 CEST (UTC+2)	Rico (yellow card) 17'; Embaló (yellow card) 61'; Alarcón (yellow card) 90+1'; Rodríguez (yellow card) 90+8'	Report	Milla 20'; Melamed (yellow card) 32'; Braithwaite (yellow card) 39', (goal) 90+3'; Lozano (yellow card) 61'	Stadium: Cartagonova; Referee: Luis Mario Milla Alvendiz

8 October 2023 10	Racing Ferrol	v	Cartagena	Ferrol
18:30 CEST (UTC+2)		Report		Stadium: Estadio Municipal da Malata; Referee: Manuel Jesús Orellana Cid

28 April 2024 37	Levante	v	Cartagena	Valencia
				Stadium: Estadi Ciutat de València

12 May 2024 39	Cartagena	v	Tenerife	Cartagena
				Stadium: Cartagonova

=== Copa del Rey ===
1 November 2023 First round	Azuaga	0–0 (2–3 p)	Cartagena
12:00 CET (UTC+1)

6 December 2023 Second round	Alcorcón	0–0 (4–5 p)	Cartagena	Alcorcón
12:00 CET (UTC+1)				Stadium: Santo Domingo
