= 2023–24 FC Andorra season =

FC Andorra
2023–24 season
- Owner: Gerard Piqué
- Head coach: Eder Sarabia (until 25 March); Ferran Costa (from 30 March)
- Stadium: Estadi Nacional
- Segunda División: 22nd
- Copa del Rey: First round
- Copa Catalunya: Winners
- Top goalscorer: League: Manu Nieto; Aurélien Scheidler (4 each); All: Manu Nieto; Aurélien Scheidler (4 each)
Home colours	Away colours

The 2023–24 season is Futbol Club Andorra's 81st season in existence and second consecutive in the Segunda División, the second division of football in Spain. They also competed in the Copa del Rey and Copa Catalunya.

== Players ==
=== First-team squad ===
As of 9 January 2024

Note: Flags indicate national team as defined under FIFA eligibility rules; some limited exceptions apply. Players may hold more than one non-FIFA nationality.

No.	Pos.	Nation	Player
1	GK	ARG	Nico Ratti (vice-captain)
2	DF	ESP	Migue Leal
3	DF	ESP	José Marsà
4	DF	ESP	Álex Pastor
5	DF	ESP	Adrià Vilanova
6	MF	ESP	Jandro Orellana
7	FW	ESP	Julen Lobete (on loan from Celta)
8	MF	ESP	Sergi Samper
9	FW	ESP	Jon Karrikaburu (on loan from Real Sociedad)
10	MF	ESP	Iván Gil
11	MF	ESP	Álvaro Martín
12	FW	GRE	Christos Albanis
13	GK	ESP	Oier Olazábal
14	MF	ESP	Sergio Molina (3rd captain)

No.	Pos.	Nation	Player
15	DF	ESP	Diego González
16	DF	ESP	Diego Pampín
17	FW	ESP	Álex Calvo
18	DF	ESP	Álex Petxa
19	FW	FRA	Aurélien Scheidler (on loan from Bari)
20	DF	ESP	Martí Vilà (4th captain)
21	MF	ESP	Rubén Bover (captain)
22	MF	ESP	Jorge Pombo
23	DF	ESP	Diego Alende
24	FW	ESP	Pablo Moreno
25	GK	ESP	Dani Martín
27	FW	ESP	Iker Benito (on loan from Osasuna)
28	DF	ESP	Marc Bombardó

=== Youth team - FC Andorra B ===
Note: Flags indicate national team as defined under FIFA eligibility rules; some limited exceptions apply. Players may hold more than one non-FIFA nationality.

No.	Pos.	Nation	Player

=== Out on loan ===
Note: Flags indicate national team as defined under FIFA eligibility rules; some limited exceptions apply. Players may hold more than one non-FIFA nationality.

No.	Pos.	Nation	Player
—	GK	ESP	Marc Vidal (at Barcelona Atlètic until 30 June 2024)
—	GK	ESP	Raúl Lizoain (at Cartagena until 30 June 2024)
—	DF	ESP	Pau Casadesús (at Espanyol B until 30 June 2024)
—	MF	ESP	Moha Moukhliss (at Barcelona Atlètic until 30 June 2024)

No.	Pos.	Nation	Player
—	FW	ESP	Arnau Prat (at Tona until 30 June 2024)
—	FW	AND	Berto Rosas (at Betis Deportivo until 30 June 2024)
—	FW	ESP	Manu Nieto (at Elche until 30 June 2024)

== Transfers ==
=== In ===
Pos.	Player	Transferred from	Fee	Date	Source
FW	(Spain) Julen Lobete	Celta Vigo	Loan	1 July 2023	
GK	(Spain) Dani Martín	Real Betis	Free	17 July 2023	
DF	(Spain) José Marsà	(Portugal) Sporting CP	Free	3 August 2023	
MF	(Spain) Álex Calvo	Málaga CF	€1m	4 August 2023	
FW	(France) Aurélien Scheidler	(Italy) SSC Bari	Loan	1 September 2023	
FW	(Spain) Jon Karrikaburu	Real Sociedad	Loan	7 January 2024	

=== Out ===
Pos.	Player	Transferred to	Fee	Date	Source
DF	(Spain) Adrià Altimira	Villarreal B	Free	1 July 2023	
DF	(Spain) Mika Mármol	Las Palmas	€1,9m	11 August 2023	
FW	(Turkey) Sinan Bakış	Real Zaragoza	Free	5 July 2023	
FW	(Spain) Manu Nieto	Elche CF	Loan	7 January 2024	

== Pre-season and friendlies ==
Win Draw Loss Fixtures

19 July 2023 Friendly	Toulouse	0–0	Andorra	Toulouse
19:00 UTC+2		Report		Stadium: Stadium annexe n°1

22 July 2023 Friendly	Girona	2–2	Andorra	Les Preses
11:00 UTC+2	Herrera 45'; Stuani 54' (pen.)	Report	Nieto 7', 21'	Stadium: Instalaciones de Royalverd

28 July 2023 Friendly	Villarreal B	3–0	Andorra	Villarreal
19:00 UTC+2				Stadium: Estadio de la Cerámica

29 July 2023 Friendly	Gimnàstic	1–2	Andorra	Tarragona
20:00 UTC+2	Jardí 50'		Nieto 87'; Bover 90+3'	Stadium: Nou Estadi Costa Daurada

4 August 2023 Friendly	Huesca	0–1	Andorra	Huesca
19:00 UTC+2			Vilanova 68'	Stadium: Base Aragonesa de Fútbol

5 August 2023 Friendly	Girona	3–0	Andorra	La Vall d'en Bas
19:00 UTC+2	García 53'; Minsu Kim 81'; Vallejo 88'	Report

24 January 2024 Friendly	Lleida Esportiu	1–1	Andorra	Lleida
	Montero	Report	Gil

== Competitions ==
=== Overall record ===
Competition	First match	Last match	Starting round	Final position	Record							
Competition	First match	Last match	Starting round	Final position	Pld	W	D	L	GF	GA	GD	Win %
Segunda División	13 August 2023	May 2024	Matchday 1		32	7	8	17	24	40	−16	21.88
Copa del Rey	1 November 2023		First round	First round	1	0	0	1	0	1	−1	0.00
Copa Catalunya	16 November 2023	20 March 2024	Semi-final	Winners	2	1	1	0	2	1	+1	50.00
Total					35	8	9	18	26	42	−16	22.86

Last updated: 23 March 2024
Source: Soccerway

=== Segunda División ===
==== League table ====
Pos	Team	Pld	W	D	L	GF	GA	GD	Pts	Qualification or relegation
18	Mirandés	42	12	13	17	47	55	−8	49 (Note: Huesca finished ahead of Mirandés on head-to-head points: Huesca 1–1 Mirandés, Mirandés 0–3 Huesca)	
19	Amorebieta (R)	42	11	12	19	37	53	−16	45	Relegation to Primera Federación
20	Alcorcón (R)	42	10	14	18	32	53	−21	44	Relegation to Primera Federación
21	Andorra (R)	42	11	10	21	33	53	−20	43 (Note: Andorra finished ahead of Villarreal B on overall goal difference)	Relegation to Primera Federación
22	Villarreal B (R)	42	11	10	21	41	62	−21	43	Relegation to Primera Federación

Updated to match(es) played on 2 Jun 2024. Source: LaLiga HyperMotion
Rules for classification: 1) Points; 2) Head-to-head points; 3) Head-to-head goal difference; 4) Goal difference; 5) Goals scored; 6) Fair-play points
(Note: Head-to-head record is used only after all the matches between the teams in question have been played)
(R) Relegated

==== Results summary ====
Overall								Home						Away					
Pld	W	D	L	GF	GA	GD	Pts	W	D	L	GF	GA	GD	W	D	L	GF	GA	GD
42	11	10	21	33	53	−20	43	9	4	8	20	19	+1	2	6	13	13	34	−21

Source: LaLiga.com

==== Results by round ====
Round	1	2	3	4	5	6	7	8	9	10	11	12	13	14	15	16	17	18	19	20	21	22	23	24	25	26	27	28	29	30	31	32
Ground	A	H	A	H	A	H	H	A	H	A	H	A	H	A	H	A	A	H	A	H	A	H	A	H	A	A	H	A	H	A	H	A
Result	W	W	L	L	L	W	D	L	L	L	W	L	W	L	L	D	D	W	D	D	L	L	L	L	D	L	D	D	W	L	L	L
Position	8	3	8	9	12	9	11	14	15	18	15	18	16	16	18	18	17	17	17	17	18	19	20	21	21	21	21	21	20	21	21	22

Updated to match(es) played on 23 March 2024. Source: LaLiga.com
A = Away; H = Home; W = Win; D = Draw; L = Loss; P = Postponed

==== Matches ====
The league fixtures were unveiled on 28 June 2023.

13 August 2023 1	Leganés	0–1	Andorra	Leganés
22:00 CEST (UTC+2)	Chicco (yellow card) 22'; Perea (yellow card) 41'; Undabarrena (yellow card) 64'; Miramón (yellow card) 87'; Arambarri (yellow card) 90+3'	Report	Bover 29'; Petxarroman (yellow card) 61'	Stadium: Estadio Municipal de Butarque; Attendance: 5,007; Referee: Rafael Sánchez López

18 August 2023 2	Andorra	3–2	Cartagena	Andorra la Vella
19:00 CEST (UTC+2)	Petxarroman (yellow card) 20'; Orellana (yellow card) 38'; Nieto 56', 64', 79' (pen.)	Report	Hevel (yellow card) 14'; A. Ortuño (yellow card) 21', (goal) 72' (pen.); Musto (yellow card) 77'; Jansson (yellow card) 84'; Descalzo 90+4'	Stadium: Estadi Nacional; Attendance: 2,520; Referee: Álvaro Moreno Aragón

27 August 2023 3	Amorebieta	3–0	Andorra	Lezama
19:30 CEST (UTC+2)	Jauregi 39'; Eraso 53'; Etxeita (yellow card) 81'; Quintero (yellow card) 90'; Sibo 90+1'	Report	Petxarroman (yellow card) 42'	Stadium: Instalaciones de Lezama Campo 2 Referee: Germán Cid Camacho

3 September 2023 4	Andorra	0–1	Tenerife	Andorra la Vella
14:00 CEST (UTC+2)		Report	López (yellow card) 36'; Amo (yellow card) 44'; Medrano (yellow card) 56'; Cruz 76'	Stadium: Estadi Nacional; Attendance: 2,010; Referee: Salvador Lax Franco

10 September 2023 5	Mirandés	4–3	Andorra	Miranda de Ebro
18:30 CEST (UTC+2)	Martínez 32'; Martín 43', 90+8'; Godoy 87'	Report	Alende 66'; Gil 90+1'; Pampín 90+3'	Stadium: Estadio Municipal de Anduva; Referee: Iván Caparrós Hernández

18 September 2023 6	Andorra	1–0	Oviedo	Andorra la Vella
21:00 CEST (UTC+2)	Lobete 81' (pen.)	Report		Stadium: Estadi Nacional; Referee: Óliver de la Fuente Ramos

23 September 2023 7	Andorra	0–0	Sporting Gijón	Andorra la Vella
14:00 CEST (UTC+2)		Report	Insua (yellow card) 48'	Stadium: Estadi Nacional; Referee: Andrés Fuentes Molina

9 October 2023 10	Elche	2–1	Andorra	Elche
19:00 CEST (UTC+2)				Stadium: Estadio Martínez Valero

15 October 2023 11	Andorra	2–0	Alcorcón	Andorra la Vella
16:15 CEST (UTC+2)				Stadium: Estadi Nacional

22 October 2023 12	Valladolid	2–0	Andorra	Valladolid
21:00 CEST (UTC+2)				Stadium: Estadio José Zorrilla

28 October 2023 13	Andorra	2–0	Levante	Andorra la Vella
18:30 CEST (UTC+2)	Scheidler 61'; Benito 90+6'			Stadium: Estadi Nacional; Referee: Miguel González Díaz

5 November 2023 14	Racing Ferrol	1–0	Andorra	Ferrol
14:00 CET (UTC+1)	Losada 11'			Stadium: Estadio Municipal da Malata; Referee: Alejandro Quintero González

12 November 2023 15	Andorra	1–3	Eldense	Andorra la Vella
16:15 CET (UTC+1)				Stadium: Estadi Nacional; Referee: Germán Cid Camacho

3 December 2023 18	Andorra	1–0	Huesca	Andorra la Vella
14:00 CET (UTC+1)	Samper 90'			Stadium: Estadi Nacional; Referee: Manuel Jesús Orellana Cid

16 December 2023 20	Andorra	1–1	Espanyol	Andorra la Vella
16:15 CET (UTC+1)	Gil 83'		Pampín 66' (o.g.)	Stadium: Estadi Nacional; Referee: Miguel Sesma Espinosa

19 December 2023 21	Racing Santander	2–0	Andorra	Santander
19:00 CET (UTC+1)	Vicente 32', (yellow card) 60'; Moreno (yellow card) 47'; Aldasoro (yellow card) 62'; Sangalli (yellow card) 80'; González 83'; Arana (yellow card) 90+2'		Scheidler (yellow card) 26'; Samper (yellow card) 59' (yellow-red card) 71'; Bover (yellow card) 90+6'	Stadium: El Sardinero; Referee: Saúl Ais Reig

14 January 2024 22	Andorra	2–3	Leganés	Andorra la Vella
14:00 CET (UTC+1)	Orellana 46'; Gil 75' (pen.)		González 62'; Sáenz 77'; García 90+5' (pen.)	Stadium: Estadi Nacional; Referee: Raúl Martín González Francés

11 February 2024 26	Alcorcón	1–0	Andorra	Alcorcón
16:15 CET (UTC+1)	Pérez 4'			Stadium: Santo Domingo; Referee: Salvador Lax Franco

17 February 2024 27	Andorra	1–1	Villarreal B	Andorra la Vella
16:15 CET (UTC+1)	Scheidler 90+1'		Collado 77'	Stadium: Estadi Nacional; Referee: Adrián Cordero Vega

3 March 2024 29	Andorra	2–1	Valladolid	Andorra la Vella
14:00 CET (UTC+1)	Pastor 81'; Scheidler 90'		Boyomo 29'	Stadium: Estadi Nacional; Referee: Raúl Martín González Francés

8 March 2024 30	Huesca	2–0	Andorra	Huesca
20:30 CET (UTC+1)	Obeng 29'; Martínez (yellow card) 47'; Hashimoto (yellow card) 59'; Zorrilla 64', (yellow card) 65'; Balboa (yellow card) 90+1'		Alende (red card) 27'	Stadium: Estadio El Alcoraz; Referee: Miguel González Díaz

13 March 2024 28	Levante	0–0	Andorra	Valencia
19:00 CET (UTC+1)	Capa (yellow card) 13'; Cantero (yellow card) 54'		Orellana (yellow card) 60'	Stadium: Estadi Ciutat de València; Referee: Miguel Sesma Espinosa
Note: The match, which was scheduled for 24 February 2024, was postponed due to the Valencia residential complex fire.

18 March 2024 31	Andorra	0–1	Amorebieta	Andorra la Vella
20:30 CET (UTC+1)	Orellana (yellow card) 74'; Marsà (yellow card) 82'; Vilanova (yellow card) 86'	Report	Bustinza (yellow card) 34', (goal) 88'; Lasure (yellow card) 61'	Stadium: Estadi Nacional; Referee: Iosu Galech Apezteguía

23 March 2024 32	Cartagena	1–0	Andorra	Cartagena
18:30 CET (UTC+1)	Fontán 41'			Stadium: Cartagonova; Referee: Jon Ander González Esteban

30 March 2024 33	Andorra	v	Mirandés	Andorra la Vella
16:15 CET (UTC+1)				Stadium: Estadi Nacional

6 April 2024 34	Eldense	v	Andorra	Elda
16:15 CEST (UTC+2)				Stadium: Nuevo Pepico Amat

14 April 2024 35	Andorra	v	Eibar	Andorra la Vella
16:15 CEST (UTC+2)				Stadium: Estadi Nacional

21 April 2024 36	Espanyol	v	Andorra	Cornellá/El Prat
14:00 CEST (UTC+2)				Stadium: Stage Front Stadium

=== Copa del Rey ===
1 November 2023 First round	Atlético Astorga	1–0	Andorra	Astorga
16:00 CET (UTC+1)	Vales 22'	Report		Stadium: Estadio La Eragudina; Referee: Álvaro Moreno Aragón

=== Copa Catalunya ===
18 October 2023 Semi-final	L'Hospitalet	0–1	Andorra	L'Hospitalet de Llobregat
20:00 CEST (UTC+2)			Gil 72'	Stadium: Estadio Municipal de Hospitalet de Llobregat

20 March 2024 Final	Olot	1–1 (2–4 p)	Andorra	Olot
19:00 CET (UTC+1)				Stadium: Estadi Municipal d'Olot
