= 2021–22 CD Alcoyano season =

CD Alcoyano
2021–22 season
- Manager: Vicente Parras
- Stadium: Estadio El Collao
- Primera División RFEF: 11th
- Copa del Rey: Round of 32

The 2021–22 season was CD Alcoyano's 109th season in existence and second consecutive season in the Primera División RFEF. They also competed in the Copa del Rey.

== Players ==
=== First-team squad ===
As of 24 February 2022

Note: Flags indicate national team as defined under FIFA eligibility rules; some limited exceptions apply. Players may hold more than one non-FIFA nationality.

No.	Pos.	Nation	Player
1	GK	ESP	José Juan
2	DF	ESP	Primi Férriz
4	DF	ESP	Carlos Blanco
5	DF	ESP	Raúl González
6	MF	ESP	Fran Miranda
7	FW	ESP	Juli (captain)
8	MF	ESP	Juanan
10	MF	ESP	Andy Escudero
11	MF	ESP	Luis Castillo
12	FW	MAR	Mourad El Ghezouani (on loan from Elche)
13	GK	SVN	Tomaž Stopajnik

No.	Pos.	Nation	Player
14	DF	ESP	Javi Antón
15	MF	ESP	Dani Vega
16	DF	ESP	Lillo
17	DF	ESP	Toni Abad
18	DF	ESP	Pablo Carbonell
19	DF	ESP	Derik Osede
20	MF	ESP	Imanol García
21	MF	ESP	Ángel López
22	FW	ESP	Toni Gabarre
23	DF	ESP	Víctor Revert

== Pre-season and friendlies ==
Win Draw Loss

4 August 2021 Friendly	Alcoyano	3–0	Eldense
19:30 UTC+2

11 August 2021 Friendly	Alcoyano	2–1	Intercity
19:00 UTC+2

18 August 2021 Friendly	Alcoyano	0–0	Athletic Torrellano
19:00 UTC+2

== Competitions ==
=== Overall record ===
Competition	First match	Last match	Starting round	Final position	Record							
Competition	First match	Last match	Starting round	Final position	Pld	W	D	L	GF	GA	GD	Win %
Primera División RFEF	27 August 2021	28 May 2022	Matchday 1	11th	38	13	13	12	41	40	+1	34.21
Copa del Rey	30 November 2021	5 January 2022	First round	Round of 32	3	2	0	1	7	6	+1	66.67
Total					41	15	13	13	48	46	+2	36.59

Source: Competitions

=== Primera División RFEF ===
==== League table ====
Pos	Team	Pld	W	D	L	GF	GA	GD	Pts
9	Barcelona B	38	16	9	13	59	51	+8	57
10	Real Madrid Castilla	38	16	8	14	66	47	+19	56
11	Alcoyano	38	13	13	12	41	40	+1	52
12	Linense	38	13	11	14	35	44	−9	50 (Note: Linense is ahead of Castellón on head-to-head points: Linense 6, Castellón 0)
13	Castellón	38	14	8	16	37	50	−13	50

Source: SoccerWay
Rules for classification: 1) points; 2) head-to-head points; 3) head-to-head goal difference; 4) goal difference; 5) number of goals scored
Notes:
3 June 2022
21:00 UTC+2

Racing Santander	3–0	Andorra
Cedric 23', 62'; Soko 86'	Report

Estadio da Malata, Ferrol
Attendance: 350
Referee: Pedro Eugenio Muñoz Piedra

==== Results summary ====
Overall								Home						Away					
Pld	W	D	L	GF	GA	GD	Pts	W	D	L	GF	GA	GD	W	D	L	GF	GA	GD
38	13	13	12	41	40	+1	52	6	8	5	19	17	+2	7	5	7	22	23	−1

==== Results by round ====
Round	1	2	3	4	5	6	7	8	9	10	11	12	13	14	15	16	17	18	19	20	21	22	23	24	25	26	27	28	29	30	31	32	33	34	35	36	37	38
Ground	H	A	H	A	A	H	A	H	A	H	A	H	A	H	A	H	A	H	H	A	H	A	H	A	H	A	H	A	H	A	H	A	A	H	A	H	A	H
Result	W	D	D	W	L	L	D	W	D	D	W	D	W	W	L	L	L	D	D	L	W	W	W	W	L	L	L	D	D	D	W	W	W	D	L	D	L	L
Position																																						

A = Away; H = Home; W = Win; D = Draw; L = Loss

==== Matches ====
27 August 2021 1	Alcoyano	1–0	Betis Deportivo Balompié	Alcoy
--:-- CEST (UTC+2)				Stadium: Estadio El Collao

4 September 2021 2	Linares Deportivo	1–1	Alcoyano	Linares
--:-- CEST (UTC+2)

11 September 2021 3	Alcoyano	1–1	Sabadell	Alcoy
--:-- CEST (UTC+2)				Stadium: Estadio El Collao

19 September 2021 4	Sevilla Atlético	1–3	Alcoyano	Seville
--:-- CEST (UTC+2)

24 September 2021 5	Gimnàstic	2–1	Alcoyano	Seville
--:-- CEST (UTC+2)

2 October 2021 6	Alcoyano	0–2	San Fernando	Alcoy
--:-- CEST (UTC+2)				Stadium: Estadio El Collao

10 October 2021 7	Sanluqueño	2–2	Alcoyano	Sanlúcar de Barrameda
--:-- CEST (UTC+2)

15 October 2021 8	Alcoyano	3–2	UCAM Murcia	Alcoy
--:-- CEST (UTC+2)				Stadium: Estadio El Collao

23 October 2021 9	Barcelona B	0–0	Alcoyano	Barcelona
--:-- CEST (UTC+2)

31 October 2021 10	Alcoyano	0–0	Algeciras	Alcoy
--:-- CEST (UTC+2)				Stadium: Estadio El Collao

7 November 2021 11	Villarreal B	0–1	Alcoyano	Villarreal
--:-- CEST (UTC+2)

13 November 2021 12	Alcoyano	0–0	Atlético Baleares	Alcoy
--:-- CEST (UTC+2)				Stadium: Estadio El Collao

20 November 2021 13	Andorra	1–2	Alcoyano	Andorra
--:-- CEST (UTC+2)

27 November 2021 14	Alcoyano	2–0	Cornellà	Alcoy
--:-- CEST (UTC+2)				Stadium: Estadio El Collao

4 December 2021 15	Albacete	2–0	Alcoyano	Albacete
--:-- CEST (UTC+2)

11 December 2021 16	Alcoyano	0–1	Costa Brava	Alcoy
--:-- CEST (UTC+2)				Stadium: Estadio El Collao

18 December 2021 17	Linense	1–0	Alcoyano	La Línea de la Concepción
--:-- CEST (UTC+2)				Stadium: Estadio Municipal de La Línea de la Concepción

22 January 2022 19	Alcoyano	1–1	Real Madrid Castilla	Alcoy
--:-- CEST (UTC+2)				Stadium: Estadio El Collao

26 January 2022 20	Sabadell	3–0	Alcoyano	Sabadell
--:-- CEST (UTC+2)				Stadium: Estadi de la Nova Creu Alta

30 January 2022 21	Alcoyano	3–0	Atlético Sanluqueño	Alcoy
--:-- CEST (UTC+2)				Stadium: Estadio El Collao

5 February 2022 22	UCAM Murcia	1–2	Alcoyano	Murcia
--:-- CEST (UTC+2)				Stadium: Estadio de La Condomina

9 February 2022 18	Alcoyano	1–1	Castellón	Alcoy
--:-- CEST (UTC+2)				Stadium: Estadio El Collao

13 February 2022 23	Alcoyano	2–1	Sevilla Atlético	Alcoy
--:-- CEST (UTC+2)				Stadium: Estadio El Collao

19 February 2022 24	Algeciras	1–2	Alcoyano	Algeciras
--:-- CEST (UTC+2)				Stadium: Estadio Nuevo Mirador

26 February 2022 25	Alcoyano	2–3	Barcelona B	Alcoy
--:-- CEST (UTC+2)				Stadium: Estadio El Collao

6 March 2022 26	Atlético Baleares	2–1	Alcoyano	Palma
--:-- CEST (UTC+2)				Stadium: Estadio Balear

12 March 2022 27	Alcoyano	0–2	Linares Deportivo	Alcoy
--:-- CEST (UTC+2)				Stadium: Estadio El Collao

19 March 2022 28	San Fernando	0–0	Alcoyano	San Fernando
--:-- CEST (UTC+2)				Stadium: Estadio Iberoamericano

27 March 2022 29	Alcoyano	0–0	Villarreal B	Alcoy
--:-- CEST (UTC+2)				Stadium: Estadio El Collao

=== Copa del Rey ===
30 November 2021 First round	Badajoz	0–3	Alcoyano	Badajoz
21:00 CET (UTC+1)				Stadium: Nuevo Vivero

14 December 2021 Second round	Alcoyano	3–3 (a.e.t.)	Levante	Alcoy
21:00 CET (UTC+1)				Stadium: Estadio El Collao

5 January 2022 Round of 32	Alcoyano	1–3	Real Madrid	Alcoy
21:30 CET (UTC+1)				Stadium: Estadio El Collao
