= 2022–23 FC Cartagena season =

FC Cartagena
2022–23 season
- President: Paco Belmonte
- Head coach: Luis Carrión
- Stadium: Cartagonova
- Segunda División: 9th
- Copa del Rey: Second round
- Top goalscorer: League: Armando Sadiku (7); All: Armando Sadiku (7)
Home colours	Away colours	Third colours
- All statistics correct as of 4 December 2022.

The 2022–23 season is the 28th season in the history of FC Cartagena and their third consecutive season in the second division. The club are participating in Segunda División and the Copa del Rey.

== Players ==
As of 11 September 2022

Note: Flags indicate national team as defined under FIFA eligibility rules; some limited exceptions apply. Players may hold more than one non-FIFA nationality.

No.	Pos.	Nation	Player
1	GK	ESP	Marc Martínez (captain)
3	FW	ESP	Jaime Romero
4	DF	ESP	Pedro Alcalá
5	DF	ESP	Pablo Vázquez
6	DF	CRO	Toni Datković
7	MF	ESP	David Ferreiro
8	MF	ARG	Pablo de Blasis (vice-captain)
9	FW	ESP	Alfredo Ortuño
10	FW	ESP	Borja Valle
11	MF	PHI	Óscar Arribas
12	MF	KOR	Lee Sang-hyeok
13	GK	ESP	Aarón Escandell

No.	Pos.	Nation	Player
14	MF	ARG	Franchu (on loan from Eibar)
15	MF	ESP	Luca Sangalli
16	DF	ESP	Iván Calero
17	MF	ESP	Mikel Rico
18	MF	ARG	Damián Musto
19	FW	ALB	Armando Sadiku
20	DF	ESP	Jairo Izquierdo
21	DF	ESP	Kiko Olivas
22	DF	ESP	Julián Delmás
23	MF	ESP	Sergio Tejera
24	FW	SWE	Isak Jansson

== Transfers ==
=== In ===
Date	Player	From	Type	Fee	Ref
1 July 2022	(Spain) Óscar Arribas	Alcorcón	Transfer	Free	
1 July 2022	(Spain) Mikel Rico	Huesca	Transfer	Free	
1 July 2022	(Spain) Luca Sangalli	Real Sociedad B	Transfer	Free	
2 July 2022	(Spain) Aarón Escandell	Granada	Transfer	Free	
3 July 2022	(Spain) Iván Calero	Málaga	Transfer	Free	
4 July 2022	(Spain) David Ferreiro	Huesca	Transfer	Free	
7 July 2022	(Spain) Borja Valle	Alcorcón	Transfer	Free	
8 July 2022	(Spain) Jairo Izquierdo	Girona	Transfer	Free	
17 July 2022	(Albania) Armando Sadiku	Las Palmas	Transfer	Free	
20 July 2022	(Spain) Kiko	Valladolid	Transfer	Free	
25 July 2022	(Argentina) Damián Musto	(Argentina) Peñarol	Transfer	Free	
28 July 2022	(Argentina) Franchu	Eibar	Loan		
1 August 2022	(Sweden) Isak Jansson	(Sweden) Kalmar	Transfer	Undisclosed	
19 August 2022	(Venezuela) Jeriel De Santis	(Portugal) Boavista	Loan		
1 September 2022	(South Korea) Lee Sang-hyeok	(Czech Republic) Pardubice	Transfer	Free	
28 September 2022	(Spain) Jaime Romero	(Azerbaijan) Qarabağ	Transfer	Free	

=== Out ===
Date	Player	To	Type	Fee	Ref
21 June 2022	(France) Yann Bodiger	Granada	Transfer	Free	
19 July 2022	(Spain) Antonio Luna	Released			

== Pre-season and friendlies ==
Win Draw Loss Fixtures

16 July 2022 Friendly	Yeclano	2–3	Cartagena
CEST (UTC+2)

21 July 2022 Friendly	Getafe	1–1	Cartagena
CEST (UTC+2)

23 July 2022 Friendly	Cartagena	0–3	Sporting Gijón
CEST (UTC+2)

26 July 2022 Friendly	Ibiza	1–1	Cartagena
CEST (UTC+2)

30 July 2022 Friendly	Cartagena	2–0	Elche
CEST (UTC+2)

5 August 2022 Friendly	Almería	1–0	Cartagena	Almería
19:30 CEST (UTC+2)				Stadium: Power Horse Stadium

6 August 2022 Friendly	Cartagena	1–1	Tenerife
CEST (UTC+2)

== Competitions ==
=== Overall record ===
Competition	First match	Last match	Starting round	Record							
Competition	First match	Last match	Starting round	Pld	W	D	L	GF	GA	GD	Win %
Segunda División	15 August 2022		Matchday 1	18	9	4	5	23	17	+6	50.00
Copa del Rey	13 November 2022		First round	1	1	0	0	1	0	+1	100.00
Total				19	10	4	5	24	17	+7	52.63

Last updated: 4 December 2022
Source: Soccerway

=== Segunda División ===
==== League table ====
Pos	Team	Pld	W	D	L	GF	GA	GD	Pts
7	Andorra	42	16	11	15	47	37	+10	59 (Note: Andorra finished ahead of Oviedo on head-to-head points: Oviedo 0–1 Andorra, Andorra 3–1 Oviedo.)
8	Oviedo	42	16	11	15	34	35	−1	59
9	Cartagena	42	16	10	16	47	49	−2	58
10	Tenerife	42	14	15	13	42	37	+5	57
11	Burgos	42	13	15	14	33	35	−2	54 (Note: Burgos finished ahead of Racing Santander on head-to-head points: Racing Santander 0–1 Burgos, Burgos 2–1 Racing Santander.)

Source: LaLiga SmartBank
Rules for classification: 1) points; 2) head-to-head points; 3) head-to-head goal difference; 4) goal difference; 5) number of goals scored
Notes:

Notes

1. Reserve teams are not eligible for promotion to the same league as the first team.

==== Results summary ====
Overall								Home						Away					
Pld	W	D	L	GF	GA	GD	Pts	W	D	L	GF	GA	GD	W	D	L	GF	GA	GD
0	0	0	0	0	0	0	0	0	0	0	0	0	0	0	0	0	0	0	0

Last updated: November 2022.
Source: LaLiga SmartBank

==== Results by round ====
Round	1
Ground	
Result	
Position	

Updated to match(es) played on November 2022. Source: LaLiga SmartBank
A = Away; H = Home; W = Win; D = Draw; L = Loss

==== Matches ====
The league fixtures were announced on 23 June 2022.

13 August 2022 1	Cartagena	v	Cartagena
CEST (UTC+2)			Stadium: Cartagonova
