= Dmitrović =

Dmitrović (Serbian Cyrillic: Дмитровић, pronounced [dmîtroʋitɕ]) is a Serbian surname. Notable people with the surname include:

- Boban Dmitrović (born 1972), Serbian football manager and former player
- Filip Dmitrović (born 1995), Serbian footballer
- Ljubiša Dmitrović (born 1969), Serbian football manager and former player
- Marina Dmitrović (born 1985), Serbian handballer
- Marko Dmitrović (born 1992), Serbian footballer
