= ASK Voitsberg =

Association football club in Voitsberg, Austria

- Full name: Arbeiter Sport-Klub Sparkasse Stadtwerke Voitsberg
- Founded: 1921 (year of foundation)
- Ground: Hans Blümel Stadion, Voitsberg
- Capacity: 1,635
- Chairman: Michael Münzer; Bernd Osprian
- Manager: Philipp Zulechner
- League: 2. Liga
- 2025–26: Austrian Regionalliga Central, 1st of 16 (promoted)

Arbeiter Sport-Klub Sparkasse Stadtwerke Voitsberg is an Austrian football club located in Voitsberg, a town in the state of Styria in the south-east of the country. Its first team competes in the 2. Liga, the second tier of the Austrian football league system.

== History ==
=== Early years ===
ASK Voitsberg was formed in 1921 as part of a general sports club that also participated in other activities such as boxing; the ASK stands for Arbeiter Sports-Klub, the English translation being worker's sports club. In the first decades of existence the team played in black and white and competed in various regional leagues in Styria. In this period, they competed in the top state league only once, finishing 7th and bottom place in 1925. This league was known as the Steiermark 1. Klasse, the modern equivalent being the Landesliga Steiermark division of the fourth tier Austrian Landesliga.

=== Under the Nazi occupation ===
During the annexation of Austria into Nazi Germany between 1938 and 1945, the club name was changed to Grün-Weiß Krems Voitsberg and the team colours became green and white.

In this period the club enjoyed its first league title, winning the Steiermark 2. Klasse or Styrian second league for the 1937–38 season. The club was promoted to a newly formed league for the 1938–39 season, the Bezirksklasse Süd, which included teams from the top state leagues in both Styria and neighbouring state Carinthia. The Bezirksklasse Süd was only in existence for one season, and Grün-Weiß Krems Voitsberg performed very poorly, finishing bottom of ten teams with no wins, two draws, 16 losses and 63 goals against.

=== The post-war years ===
After World War II, the club promptly reverted its official name back to ASK Voitsberg, and rejected the green and white colours in favour of their traditional black and white. The club languished in lower state leagues for several years until returning to the top Styria league, then known as Landesliga Steiermark, for the 1950–51 season. The team finished this campaign narrowly avoiding relegation in second-bottom ninth place. This league was extended to twelve teams for the 1951–52 season, and ASK Voitsberg finished in the bottom half of the table for several seasons until coming fifth in the 1956–57 season.

The club continued to compete in this league into the 1960s, enjoying a successful campaign in 1961–62, winning the title, becoming Styria state champion and gaining promotion to the central division of the then second tier Austrian Regional League. In 1962–63, however, the club finished second bottom of the Austrian Regional League central in 13th place and was relegated back to the Landesliga Steiermark.

ASK Voitsberg won the Landesliga Steiermark again in 1966–67, and in 1967–68 avoided relegation from the Austrian Regional League Central by finishing mid-table. The team kept their place in this league until becoming relegated for a second time in 1970–71.

The team was confined to the state and regional leagues for the next decade. In 1974, the regional leagues lost status due to the creation of the nationwide Austrian Football First League division, which became the second-tier league immediately below the Austrian Football Bundesliga. The Austrian Regional League Central was also temporarily disbanded, and the winners of the three state leagues (Styria, Carinthia and Upper Austria) would instead face a play-off competition to send one club to the First League. In 1982–83, the club won both the Landesliga Steiermark title and the promotional play-off, reaching the First League for the first time. In 1983–84, it finished in a respectable 12th position of 16 teams in its first season in a national division. Despite finishing 9th the following season, the club was relegated back to the regional leagues along with all clubs who did not achieve a top five position as a result of league restructuring.

=== Recent seasons ===
Since then, the club has competed in the third tier Austrian Regional League Central (which was restored in 1994–95) and the fourth tier Landesliga Steiermark, winning the latter on two occasions in 1994–95 and 2006–07. In 2010–11, the club finished bottom of the Austrian Regional League Central, and will compete in the Landesliga Steiermark once again in 2011–12. Speaking in June 2011, manager Jürgen Auffinger told a Styrian amateur football website that while relegation was a big disappointment, he believed the team had enough quality to make a swift return to the Austrian Regional League Central. In the 2010/11 season, the club had the second oldest team in the division and was only one of three clubs whose players were all of Austrian nationality. In recent seasons the club has also competed in the Austrian Cup.

== Stadium ==
ASK Voitsberg play their home matches in Voitsberg's Hans Blümel Stadion. The stadium's capacity is 2500. The team's average home attendance for the 2010–11 season was 640.

== Current squad ==
As of 23 September 2026

Note: Flags indicate national team as defined under FIFA eligibility rules; some limited exceptions apply. Players may hold more than one non-FIFA nationality.

No.	Pos.	Nation	Player
1	GK	SLO	Tomaž Stopajnik
3	DF	GRE	Nikolaos Vakouftsis
4	DF	BIH	Adem Mustafic
6	MF	AUT	Daniel Saurer
7	MF	AUT	Paolo Jager
8	MF	AUT	Philipp Scheucher
9	FW	AUT	Fabian Schubert
10	MF	AUT	Christopher Wölbl
11	FW	AUT	Marcel Tanzmayr
13	DF	AUT	Sebastian Pirker
15	FW	AUT	Martin Krienzer
19	MF	AUT	Kai Stratznig
23	DF	CRO	Luka Zivanovic

No.	Pos.	Nation	Player
27	DF	BIH	Anel Karic
28	MF	AUT	Johannes Schriebl
30	FW	AUT	Daniel Goriupp
31	GK	AUT	Christian Pöschl
36	GK	SRB	Filip Dmitrović
39	MF	AUT	Elias Neubauer
40	FW	AUT	Jakob Knollmüller
44	DF	SRB	Andrej Stevanovic
46	DF	AUT	Manuel Polster
77	DF	AUT	Tristan Brükk
80	MF	AUT	Andreas Radics
99	GK	AUT	Felix Loidl

^1-Player holds more than one nationality

== Achievements ==
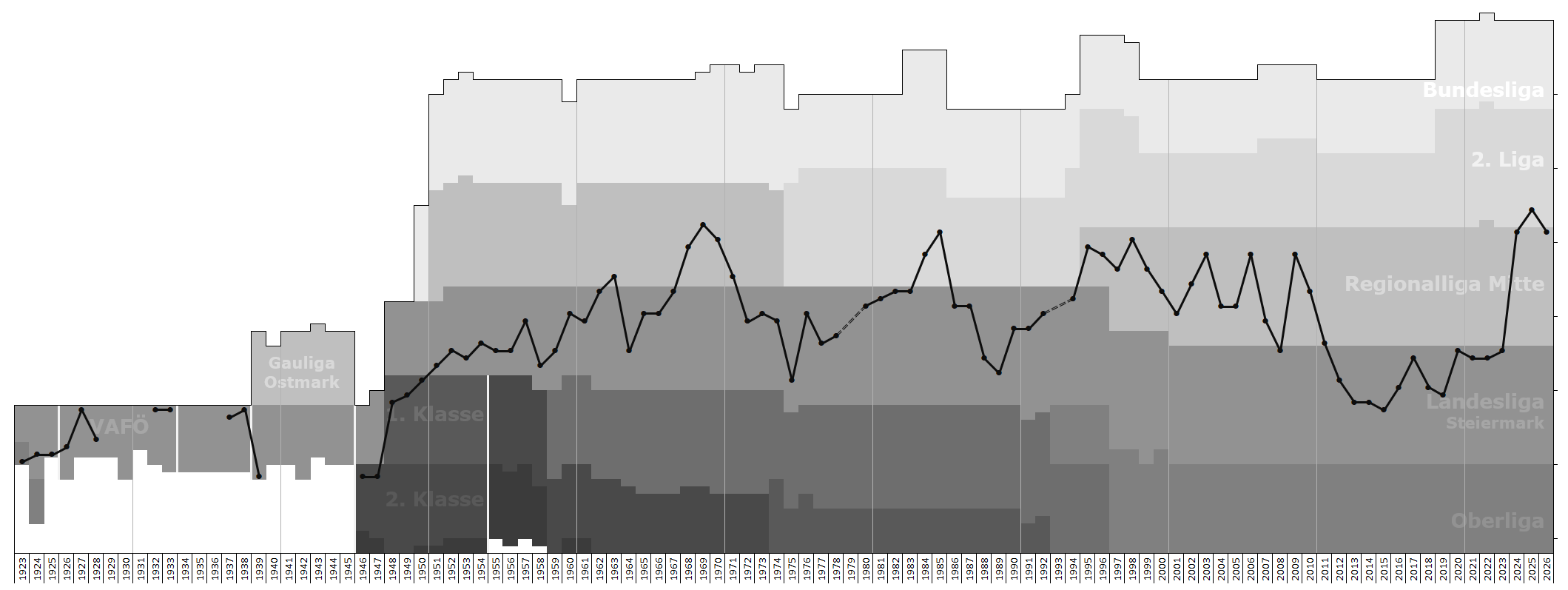
Historical chart of ASK Voitsberg league performance

- Regionalliga Central:
  - Winners (2): 2023–24, 2025–26
- Landesliga Steiermark:
  - Winners (6): 1961–62, 1966–67, 1982–83, 1994–95, 2006–07, 2022–23
- Steiermark 2. Klasse:
  - Winners (1): 1937–38

== See also ==
- Football in Austria
- Austrian Regional League Central
