= Álvaro Martín =

Álvaro Martín may refer to:

- Álvaro Martín (racewalker) (born 1994), Spanish racewalker
- Álvaro Martín (footballer) (born 2001), Spanish footballer
- Álvaro Martín (sports announcer), Puerto Rican commentator
