= Jairo Izquierdo =

Spanish footballer

Personal information
- Full name: Jairo Izquierdo González
- Date of birth: 22 October 1993 (age 33)
- Place of birth: Santa Cruz de Tenerife, Spain
- Height: 1.65 m (5 ft 5 in)
- Positions: Left back; winger

Team information
- Current team: AEK Larnaca
- Number: 23

Youth career
- 2005–2011: Tenerife

Senior career*
| Years | Team | Apps | (Gls) |
| 2011–2014 | Tenerife B | 84 | (12) |
| 2014–2017 | Tenerife | 18 | (0) |
| 2014–2015 | → Murcia (loan) | 32 | (2) |
| 2017 | Melilla | 17 | (1) |
| 2017–2018 | Extremadura | 38 | (6) |
| 2018–2022 | Girona | 70 | (0) |
| 2018–2019 | → Cádiz (loan) | 31 | (3) |
| 2020–2021 | → Cádiz (loan) | 30 | (1) |
| 2022–2025 | Cartagena | 93 | (5) |
| 2025 | Elche | 9 | (0) |
| 2025- | AEK Larnaca | 26 | (1) |
- * Club domestic league appearances and goals as of 14 June 2026

Jairo Izquierdo González (born 22 October 1993), sometimes known as just Jairo, is a Spanish professional footballer who plays as a left-back or a left winger for Cypriot First Division club AEK Larnaca.

== Club career ==
Born in Santa Cruz de Tenerife, Canary Islands, Jairo graduated with CD Tenerife's youth setup. He made his debuts as a senior with the reserves in 2011, in Tercera División.

On 2 July 2014 Jairo signed a new three-year deal with the club, being promoted to the main squad in Segunda División. On 1 September, however, he was loaned to Segunda División B side Real Murcia, in a season-long deal.

On 5 September 2015 Jairo made his professional debut, coming on as a second-half substitute for Omar Perdomo in a 1–1 away draw against SD Huesca. On 17 January 2017, after making no appearances during the campaign, he left the club by mutual consent and joined UD Melilla just hours later.

On 18 August 2018, Jairo signed a four-year contract with Girona FC in La Liga. Eleven days later, he was loaned to second division side Cádiz CF for the season.

Upon returning from loan, Jairo spent the 2019–20 campaign with his parent club, now also in the second division. On 5 October 2020, he returned to Cádiz, again in a one-year loan deal.

Jairo returned to Girona in July 2021, and was converted into a left back during the pre-season, subsequently picking up the number 3 jersey. On 8 July 2022, after the club's promotion to the top tier, he moved to FC Cartagena in the second division on a two-year deal.

On 30 January 2025, Jairo moved to fellow second division side Elche CF after the club paid his € 600,000 release clause. On 1 September, after helping the side to another promotion to the first division, he terminated his contract with the club. On the same day, he joined Cypriot First Division club AEK Larnaca on a three-year contract.

== Career statistics ==
=== Club ===
As of match played 25 May 2025.

Appearances and goals by club, season and competition
| Club | Season | League | | | National Cup | | Other | | Total | |
| Club | Season | Division | Apps | Goals | Apps | Goals | Apps | Goals | Apps | Goals |
|---|---|---|---|---|---|---|---|---|---|---|
| Tenerife | 2015–16 | Segunda División | 18 | 0 | 1 | 0 | — | | 19 | 0 |
| Tenerife | 2016–17 | Segunda División | 0 | 0 | 0 | 0 | — | | 0 | 0 |
| Tenerife | Total | | 18 | 0 | 1 | 0 | — | | 19 | 0 |
| Murcia (loan) | 2014–15 | Segunda División B | 32 | 2 | 1 | 1 | 2 (Note: Appearance(s) in Promotion Playoffs) | 0 | 35 | 3 |
| Melilla | 2016–17 | Segunda División B | 17 | 1 | 0 | 0 | — | | 17 | 1 |
| Extremadura | 2017–18 | Segunda División B | 38 | 6 | 0 | 0 | 6 | 0 | 44 | 6 |
| Girona | 2019–20 | Segunda División | 34 | 0 | 1 | 0 | 4 | 0 | 39 | 0 |
| Girona | 2020–21 | Segunda División | 2 | 0 | 0 | 0 | — | | 2 | 0 |
| Girona | 2021–22 | Segunda División | 34 | 0 | 2 | 0 | 4 | 0 | 40 | 0 |
| Girona | Total | | 70 | 0 | 3 | 0 | 8 | 0 | 81 | 0 |
| Cádiz (loan) | 2018–19 | Segunda División | 31 | 3 | 3 | 0 | — | | 34 | 3 |
| Cádiz (loan) | 2020–21 | La Liga | 30 | 1 | 3 | 0 | — | | 33 | 1 |
| Cartagena | 2022–23 | Segunda División | 38 | 2 | 2 | 0 | — | | 40 | 2 |
| Cartagena | 2023–24 | Segunda División | 35 | 2 | 2 | 0 | — | | 37 | 2 |
| Cartagena | 2024–25 | Segunda División | 20 | 1 | 2 | 0 | — | | 22 | 1 |
| Cartagena | Total | | 93 | 5 | 6 | 0 | — | | 99 | 5 |
| Elche | 2024–25 | Segunda División | 8 | 0 | — | | — | | 8 | 0 |
| Career total | | | 337 | 18 | 17 | 1 | 16 | 0 | 370 | 19 |
