= 2024–25 FC Cartagena season =

FC Cartagena
2024–25 season
- Head coach: Abelardo Fernández (until 25 September)
- Stadium: Estadio Cartagonova
- Segunda División: 22nd (relegated)
- Copa del Rey: Round of 32

The 2024–25 season is the 30th season in the history of the FC Cartagena, and the club's fifth consecutive season in Segunda División. In addition to the domestic league, the team is scheduled to participate in the Copa del Rey.

== Transfers ==
=== In ===
Pos.	Player	Transferred from	Fee	Date	Source
DF	(Spain) Martín Aguirregabiria	(Portugal) Famalicão	Free	1 July 2024	
GK	(Spain) Pablo Cuñat	(Spain) Levante	Loan	9 July 2024	
GK	(Spain) Toni Fuidias	(Spain) Girona	Loan	10 July 2024	
MF	(Spain) Sergio Guerrero	(Spain) Atlético Madrid B	Free	11 July 2024	
DF	(Montenegro) Andrija Vukčević	(Mexico) FC Juárez	Loan	17 July 2024	

=== Out ===
Pos.	Player	Transferred to	Fee	Date	Source
MF	(Sweden) Isak Jansson	(Austria) Rapid Vienna	€250,000	1 July 2024	

== Friendlies ==
=== Pre-season ===
18 July 2024 Friendly	Cartagena	2–0	AFC Bournemouth U21
19:00	Ortuño 46'; Baldo 59'	Report

24 July 2024 Friendly	Yeclano	0–3	Cartagena
19:30

27 July 2024 Friendly	Cartagena	2–0	Al-Ettifaq
19:00	32'; 85'		(red card) 79'

31 July 2024 Friendly	Cartagena	1–1	Eldense
19:00

4 August 2024 Friendly	Cartagena	1–1	Almería	Cartagena
20:30 UTC+2				Stadium: Estadio Cartagonova

== Competitions ==
=== Overall record ===
Competition	First match	Last match	Starting round	Record							
Competition	First match	Last match	Starting round	Pld	W	D	L	GF	GA	GD	Win %
Segunda División	16–19 August 2024	1 June 2025	Matchday 1	6	1	0	5	5	10	−5	16.67
Copa del Rey				0	0	0	0	0	0	+0	—
Total				6	1	0	5	5	10	−5	16.67

Last updated: 22 September 2024
Source: Soccerway

=== Segunda División ===
==== League table ====
Pos	Team	Pld	W	D	L	GF	GA	GD	Pts	Qualification or relegation
18	Zaragoza	42	13	12	17	56	63	−7	51	
19	Eldense (R)	42	11	12	19	44	63	−19	45	Relegation to Primera Federación
20	Tenerife (R)	42	8	12	22	35	55	−20	36	Relegation to Primera Federación
21	Racing Ferrol (R)	42	6	12	24	22	64	−42	30	Relegation to Primera Federación
22	Cartagena (R)	42	6	5	31	33	78	−45	23	Relegation to Primera Federación

Source: LaLiga Hypermotion
Rules for classification: 1) Points; 2) Head-to-head points; 3) Head-to-head goal difference; 4) Goal difference; 5) Goals scored; 6) Fair-play points
(Note: Head-to-head record is used only after all the matches between the teams in question have been played)
(R) Relegated

==== Results summary ====
Overall								Home						Away					
Pld	W	D	L	GF	GA	GD	Pts	W	D	L	GF	GA	GD	W	D	L	GF	GA	GD
6	1	0	5	5	10	−5	3	0	0	3	2	5	−3	1	0	2	3	5	−2

Last updated: 22 September 2024.

==== Results by round ====
Round	1	2	3	4	5	6	7
Ground	A	H	A	H	A	H	A
Result	L	L	W	L	L	L	
Position							

Updated to match(es) played on 22 September 2024. Source:
A = Away; H = Home; W = Win; D = Draw; L = Loss

==== Matches ====
The match schedule was released on 26 June 2024.

26 August 2024 2	Cartagena	1–2	Zaragoza	Cartagena
19:00				Stadium: Estadio Cartagonova

1 September 2024 3	Eldense	1–2	Cartagena	Elda
19:00				Stadium: Nuevo Pepico Amat

8 September 2024 4	Cartagena	0–1	Levante	Cartagena
16:15			Morales 28'	Stadium: Estadio Cartagonova

15 September 2024 5	Oviedo	1–0	Cartagena	Oviedo
16:15				Stadium: Estadio Carlos Tartiere

22 September 2024 6	Cartagena	1–2	Cádiz	Cartagena
16:15	Muñoz 59'		Ramos 22', 80'	Stadium: Estadio Cartagonova

30 September 2024 7	Racing Santander	1–2	Cartagena	Santander
20:30				Stadium: Campos de Sport de El Sardinero

5 October 2024 8	Tenerife	2–0	Cartagena	Santa Cruz de Tenerife

18 October 2024 10	Córdoba	2–1	Cartagena	Córdoba

26 October 2024 12	Mirandés	3–1	Cartagena	Miranda de Ebro

9 November 2024 14	Málaga	1–0	Cartagena	Málaga

2 December 2024 17	Eibar	1–0	Cartagena	Eibar

14 December 2024 19	Castellón	4–1	Cartagena	Castellón de la Plana

17 December 2024 20	Granada	4–1	Cartagena	Granada

11 January 2025 22	Racing Ferrol	0–0	Cartagena	Ferrol

25 January 2025 24	Huesca	4–0	Cartagena	Huesca

9 February 2025 26	Cádiz	5–2	Cartagena	Cádiz

23 February 2025 28	Elche	2–1	Cartagena	Elche

9 March 2025 30	Levante	3–0	Cartagena	Valencia

23 March 2025 32	Deportivo La Coruña	2–2	Cartagena	A Coruña

29 March 2025 33	Cartagena	2–2	Castellón	Cartagena
				Stadium: Estadio Cartagonova

5 April 2025 34	Cartagena	0–1	Eldense	Cartagena
				Stadium: Estadio Cartagonova

13 April 2025 35	Almería	3–1	Cartagena	Almería

20 April 2025 36	Cartagena	2–3	Granada	Cartagena
14:00				Stadium: Estadio Cartagonova

26 April 2025 37	Albacete	v	Cartagena	Albacete
14:00

=== Copa del Rey ===
30 October 2024 First round	Beasain	0–1	Cartagena	Beasain
19:30			Luis Muñoz 90'	Stadium: Estado Municipal de Loinaz; Referee: Miguel Sesma

5 December 2024 Second round	Andorra	0–1	Cartagena	Andorra la Vella
20:00			Alfredo Ortuño 29'	Referee: Carlos Muñiz

5 January 2025 Round of 32	Cartagena	1–2	Leganés	Cartagena
15:30				Stadium: Estadio Cartagonova; Referee: Víctor García
