= Tomaž Stopajnik =

Slovenian footballer (born 2001)

Personal information
- Date of birth: 14 January 2001 (age 25)
- Place of birth: Slovenj Gradec, Slovenia
- Height: 1.89 m (6 ft 2 in)
- Position: Goalkeeper

Team information
- Current team: ASK Voitsberg
- Number: 1

Youth career
- 2013–2015: Dravograd
- 2015–2018: Maribor
- 2018–2019: Rudar Velenje

Senior career*
Years	Team	Apps	(Gls)
2018–2021	Rudar Velenje	24	(0)
2021–2023	Alcoyano	3	(0)
2023–2024	Ceuta	2	(0)
2024–2025	Bergantiños	2	(0)
2025	Atlético Paso	7	(0)
2025–	ASK Voitsberg	10	(0)

International career^{‡}
2019	Slovenia U19	2	(0)
- * Club domestic league appearances and goals as of 27 June 2026 ‡ National team caps and goals as of 10:17, 6 January 2022 (UTC)

Tomaž Stopajnik (born 14 January 2001) is a Slovenian professional footballer who plays as a goalkeeper for ASK Voitsberg.

== Club career ==
In February 2019, Stopajnik made his professional debut in the Slovenian PrvaLiga for Rudar Velenje in a 6–2 loss to Domžale. In July 2021, he joined Primera División RFEF side Alcoyano on a free transfer. After spells with Spanish clubs Ceuta, Bergantiños and Atlético Paso, Stopajnik joined Austrian Regionalliga Central side ASK Voitsberg in July 2025.

== International career ==
Stopajnik represented Slovenia at under-19 in two friendlies in 2019.
