= Jaume Jardí =

Spanish footballer

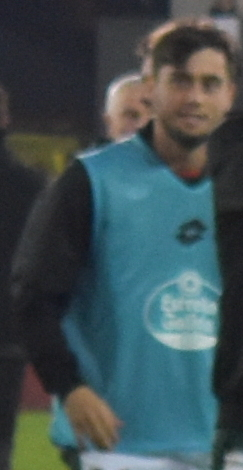
- Jardí with Racing Ferrol in 2022

Personal information
- Full name: Jaume Jardí Poyato
- Date of birth: 7 April 2002 (age 24)
- Place of birth: Reus, Spain
- Height: 1.75 m (5 ft 9 in)
- Positions: Forward; winger

Team information
- Current team: Zaragoza

Youth career
- 2008–2011: Pastoreta
- 2011–2012: Santes Creus
- 2012–2016: Reus
- 2016–2021: Barcelona

Senior career*
Years	Team	Apps	(Gls)
2020–2021	Barcelona B	1	(0)
2021–2023	Real Madrid B	18	(0)
2022–2023	→ Racing Ferrol (loan)	27	(4)
2023–2026	Gimnàstic	138	(23)
2026–	Zaragoza	0	(0)

International career^{‡}
2020	Spain U18	3	(0)
2025–	Catalonia	1	(0)
- * Club domestic league appearances and goals as of 23 May 2026 ‡ National team caps and goals as of 14:30, 19 November 2025 (UTC)

Jaume Jardí Poyato (born 7 April 2002) is a Spanish professional footballer who plays as a forward or winger for Real Zaragoza.

== Club career ==
=== Barcelona ===
Born in Reus, Tarragona, Catalonia, Jardí progressed through the academies of EF la Pastoreta and CE Santes Creus before a move to professional side CF Reus Deportiu in 2012. After four years with Reus, he joined FC Barcelona in 2016, and his career with the youth team started brightly, scoring 13 goals in his first 8 games.

In January 2020, Jordí trained with the first team, alongside fellow youth player Xavier Mbuyamba. He made his senior debut with FC Barcelona B on 17 January 2021, coming on as a late substitute for Jandro Orellana in a 3–1 Segunda División B away loss against Gimnàstic de Tarragona.

=== Real Madrid ===
After five seasons in Catalonia, and being named captain of the under-19 side in his last year, Jardí rejected a new contract with Barcelona, and took up the offer from arch-rivals Real Madrid in 2021. In doing so, he became the first player to make the switch from the B-team of Barcelona to Real Madrid Castilla since Kiko Femenía in 2013.

==== Loan to Racing Ferrol ====
In July 2022, Jardí was loaned to fellow Primera Federación side Racing de Ferrol, for one year. On 27 May 2023, he scored twice in a 2–0 home win over Celta de Vigo B, which ensured Racing's promotion to Segunda División after a 15-year absence.

=== Gimnàstic ===
On 28 July 2023, Jardí signed a three-year contract with fellow third division side Gimnàstic de Tarragona back in his native region. And undisputed starter during his spell, he was the club's top scorer in the 2025–26 campaign, as they narrowly avoided relegation.

=== Zaragoza ===
On 8 June 2026, Jardí was announced at Real Zaragoza, recently relegated to division three, on a three-year deal.

== International career ==
Jardí has represented Spain at under-18 level. He debuted with the Catalonia team in a friendly 2–1 win over Palestine on 18 November 2025.

== Career statistics ==
=== Club ===
As of 17 December 2022

Appearances and goals by club, season and competition
Club	Season	League			Cup		Other		Total	
Club	Season	Division	Apps	Goals	Apps	Goals	Apps	Goals	Apps	Goals
Barcelona B	2020–21	Segunda División B	1	0	–		0	0	1	0
Real Madrid B	2021–22	Primera División RFEF	18	0	–		0	0	18	0
Real Madrid B	2022–23	Primera Federación	0	0	–		0	0	0	0
Real Madrid B	Total		18	0	0	0	0	0	18	0
Racing Ferrol (loan)	2022–23	Primera Federación	10	0	1	0	0	0	11	0
Career total			29	0	1	0	0	0	30	0
