= Marcel Tanzmayr =

Austrian footballer

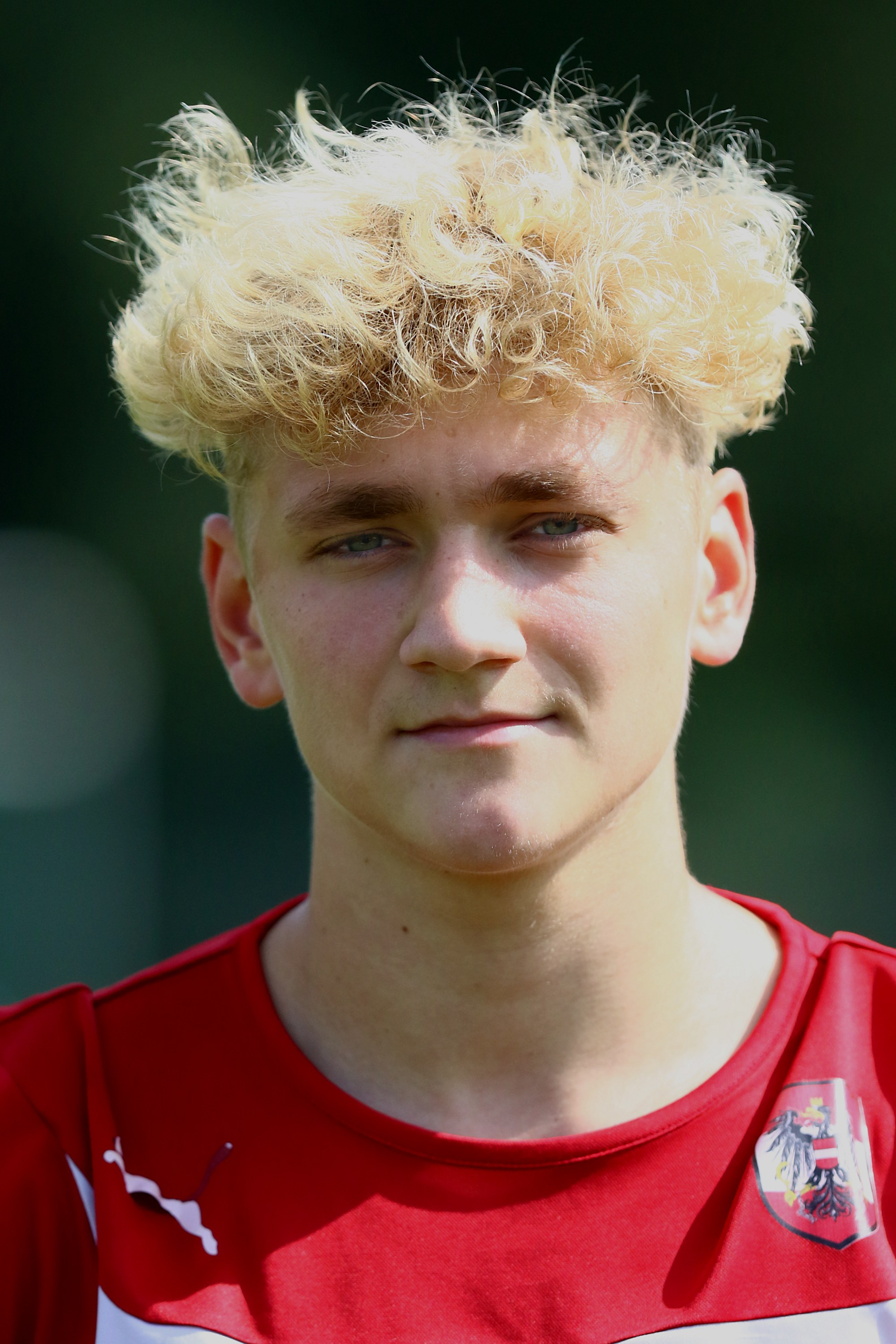
- Tanzmayr with Austria U17 in 2018

Personal information
- Date of birth: 13 January 2002 (age 24)
- Place of birth: Vienna, Austria
- Height: 1.86 m (6 ft 1 in)
- Position: Forward

Team information
- Current team: ASK Voitsberg
- Number: 11

Youth career
- 2008–2013: FC Gänserndorf-Süd
- 2013–2016: SV Strasshof
- 2016–2020: SKN St. Pölten

Senior career*
Years	Team	Apps	(Gls)
2020–2022	SKN St. Pölten	14	(1)
2022–2024	First Vienna	33	(3)
2024–2025	FC Marchfeld Donauauen	28	(7)
2025–	ASK Voitsberg	17	(1)

International career^{‡}
2018	Austria U17	2	(0)
- * Club domestic league appearances and goals as of 27 June 2026 ‡ National team caps and goals as of 18:18, 7 July 2020 (UTC)

Marcel Tanzmayr (born 13 January 2002) is an Austrian footballer who plays as a forward for ASK Voitsberg.

== Career ==
Tanzmayr moved to Austrian Regionalliga East club First Vienna on 5 February 2022, signing a one-year contract, alongside former Austria international Deni Alar.

== Career statistics ==
As of 7 July 2020.

Appearances and goals by club, season and competition
Club	Season	League			Cup		Continental		Other		Total	
Club	Season	Division	Apps	Goals	Apps	Goals	Apps	Goals	Apps	Goals	Apps	Goals
SKN St. Pölten	2019–20	Bundesliga	1	0	0	0	–		0	0	1	0
Career total			1	0	0	0	0	0	0	0	1	0
