= Mamadou Cellou =

Guinean footballer

Personal information
- Full name: Mamadou Cellou Diallo
- Date of birth: 5 January 2002 (age 24)
- Place of birth: Conakry, Guinea
- Height: 1.77 m (5 ft 10 in)
- Position: Winger

Youth career
- Lorca Deportiva
- Puig-reig
- 2019–2020: Lorca Deportiva

Senior career*
Years	Team	Apps	(Gls)
2020–2023	Lorca Deportiva	50	(10)
2021–2022	→ Águilas (loan)	26	(2)
2023–2024	Cartagena B	17	(3)
2024	Cartagena	1	(0)
2024–2025	Alcoyano	3	(0)
- * Club domestic league appearances and goals as of 24 May 2025

Mamadou Cellou Diallo (born 5 January 2002) is a Guinean professional footballer who plays as a winger.

== Career ==
Born in Conakry, Cellou moved to Spain at the age of 14, and joined CF Lorca Deportiva's youth sides from CE Puig-reig. On 31 January 2020, he was promoted to the first team, and featured in one match before the season was suspended due to the COVID-19 pandemic.

On 30 August 2021, after being regularly used as Lorca suffered relegation from Segunda División B, Cellou was loaned to Segunda División RFEF side Águilas FC for one year, with a buyout clause. On 1 July 2022, after also dropping down a level, he returned to Lorca in Tercera Federación.

On 16 July 2023, Cellou moved to FC Cartagena and was assigned to the reserves in the fourth division. He made his first team – and professional – debut the following 14 January, coming on as a late substitute for Tomás Alarcón in a 4–1 Segunda División home routing of Villarreal CF B.

On 20 June 2024, Cellou signed for Primera Federación side CD Alcoyano.
