= Dani Vega =

Spanish footballer

Personal information
- Full name: Daniel Vega Cintas
- Date of birth: 11 January 1997 (age 29)
- Place of birth: Mérida, Spain
- Height: 1.76 m (5 ft 9 1/2 in)
- Position: Forward

Team information
- Current team: Polonia Warsaw
- Number: 7

Youth career
- Valladolid

Senior career*
Years	Team	Apps	(Gls)
2014–2018	Valladolid B	110	(5)
2014	Valladolid	0	(0)
2018–2020	Celta B	39	(4)
2020	Melilla	7	(0)
2020–2021	Extremadura	0	(0)
2021	→ Lorca Deportiva (loan)	13	(1)
2021–2022	Alcoyano	35	(2)
2022–2024	Real Murcia	68	(8)
2024–	Polonia Warsaw	62	(8)
- * Club domestic league appearances and goals as of 15:25, 29 May 2026 (UTC)

Daniel 'Dani' Vega Cintas (born 11 January 1997) is a Spanish professional footballer who plays as a forward for Polish club Polonia Warsaw.

== Club career ==
Vega was born in Mérida, Badajoz, Extremadura. He made his senior debuts with Real Valladolid's reserve team in the 2014–15 campaign, in Segunda División B, aged only 17.

On 15 October 2014, Vega played his first match as a professional, starting in a 2–0 home win over Girona for the season's Copa del Rey. The remainder of his spell at the club was limited to the B-team, however.

On 2 July 2018, Vega moved to another reserve team, Celta Vigo B also in the third division. He continued to appear in that category in the following years, representing Melilla and Extremadura.

After stints with Alcoyano and Real Murcia, Vega made his first career move abroad in the summer of 2024, when he joined Polish second-tier club Polonia Warsaw on 26 July.
