= Juan Carlos Sabater =

Spanish footballer

Personal information
- Full name: Juan Carlos Sabater Herrera
- Date of birth: 28 June 2006 (age 20)
- Place of birth: Cartagena, Spain
- Position: Centre back

Team information
- Current team: Zaragoza B
- Number: 4

Youth career
- Valencia
- 2019–2023: Elche

Senior career*
Years	Team	Apps	(Gls)
2023–2024	Cartagena B	21	(0)
2023–2024	Cartagena	1	(0)
2024–	Zaragoza B	58	(0)
- * Club domestic league appearances and goals as of 14 May 2026

Juan Carlos Sabater Herrera (born 28 June 2006) is a Spanish professional footballer who plays as a central defender for Deportivo Aragón.

== Career ==
Born in Cartagena, Region of Murcia, Sabater joined Elche CF's youth setup in June 2019, from Valencia CF. In 2023, after spending seven months nursing a knee injury, he moved to hometown side FC Cartagena.

Initially assigned to the Juvenil A, Sabater made his senior debut with the reserves on 17 September 2023, coming on as a late substitute in a 2–1 Segunda Federación home loss to Vélez CF. He made his first team debut on 6 December, starting in a 0–0 away draw (5–4 penalty win) against AD Alcorcón, for the season's Copa del Rey.

On 2 July 2024, Sabater moved to another reserve team after agreeing to a two-year contract with Deportivo Aragón.
