= Carlos Sánchez (footballer, born 2001) =

Spanish footballer

Personal information
- Full name: Carlos Sánchez Jiménez
- Date of birth: 19 April 2001 (age 25)
- Place of birth: Palma, Spain
- Position: Right back

Team information
- Current team: Andratx
- Number: 22

Youth career
- Mallorca

Senior career*
Years	Team	Apps	(Gls)
2020–2022	Andratx	55	(0)
2022–2024	Cartagena B	42	(1)
2023–2024	Cartagena	3	(0)
2024–2025	Orihuela	1	(0)
2025–	Andratx	8	(0)
- * Club domestic league appearances and goals as of 28 September 2025

Carlos Sánchez Jiménez (born 19 April 2001) is a Spanish footballer who plays as a right back for Segunda Federación club Andratx.

== Club career ==
Born in Palma de Mallorca, Balearic Islands, Sánchez played youth football with hometown side RCD Mallorca. On 14 October 2020, after finishing his formation, he signed for Tercera División side CE Andratx.

Sánchez was a regular starter during the season, as his side achieved a first-ever promotion to Segunda División RFEF. On 22 June 2022, after suffering relegation, he moved to FC Cartagena and was initially assigned to the reserves also in the fourth division.

Sánchez made his first team debut for the Efesé on 14 January 2023, starting in a 0–0 Segunda División home draw against SD Huesca.

On 19 June 2024, Sánchez signed for Orihuela CF also in the fourth division.
