= Estadio El Collao =

Football stadium in Alcoy, Spain

El Collao Stadium
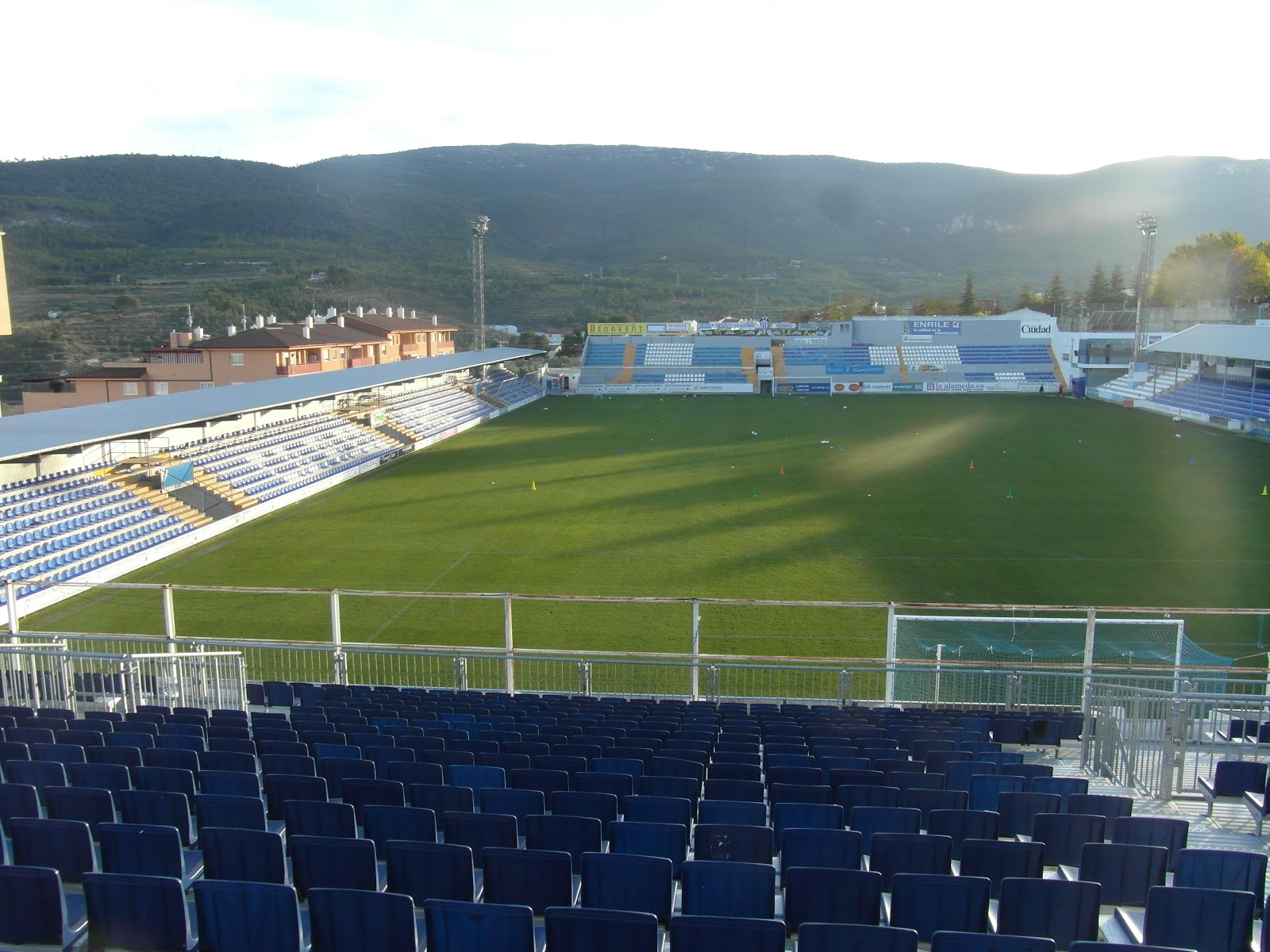
- Interactive map of El Collao Stadium
- Full name: Estadio El Collao
- Location: Calle Oliver s/n 03802 Alcoy, Spain
- Coordinates: 38°41′27.52″N 0°29′24.93″W
- Operator: CD Alcoyano
- Capacity: 3,371
- Surface: grass
- Field size: 102 m × 65 m (335 ft × 213 ft)

Construction
- Built: 1921
- Opened: 28 August 1921

Estadio El Collao is a Stadium located in Calle Oliver in the city of Alcoy (Alicante), Spain. It is the home ground of CD Alcoyano with a capacity of 3,371 spectators.

This stadium has hosted matches of the 1st division, 2nd division, 2nd division B, 3rd division, and regional levels. The pitch has a dimensions of 102 x 63 meters.
