= Adrià Vilanova =

Spanish footballer

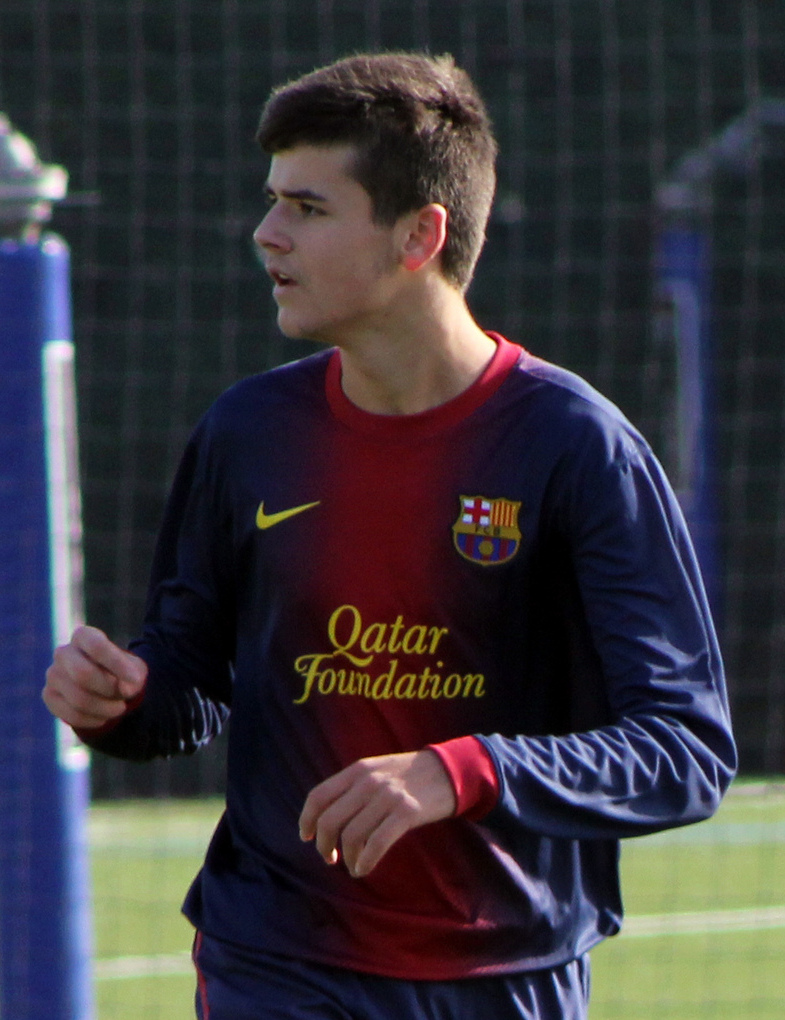
- Vilanova in 2012

Personal information
- Full name: Adrià Vilanova Chaure
- Date of birth: 11 February 1997 (age 29)
- Place of birth: Barcelona, Spain
- Height: 1.87 m (6 ft 2 in)
- Position: Centre-back

Youth career
- Barcelona

Senior career*
Years	Team	Apps	(Gls)
2017–2018	Barcelona B	1	(0)
2017–2018	→ Hércules (loan)	2	(1)
2018	Mallorca B	7	(0)
2018–2024	Andorra	161	(5)
2024–2025	Alcorcón	0	(0)
- * Club domestic league appearances and goals as of 24 May 2025

Adrià Vilanova Chaure (born 11 February 1997) is a Spanish professional footballer who plays as a centre-back.

== Club career ==
Born in Barcelona, Catalonia, Vilanova was a FC Barcelona youth graduate. He made his senior debut with the reserves on 8 January 2017, coming on as a late substitute for goalscorer Dani Romera in a 3–1 Segunda División B away win over Atlético Saguntino.

On 12 August 2017, Vilanova was loaned to fellow third division side Hércules CF for the season. He made his debut at the club on 15 October, starting and scoring the equalizer in a 3–2 home win over CF Peralada.

In August 2018, after only one further match for Hércules, Vilanova left Barça and moved to another reserve team, RCD Mallorca B in Tercera División. On 31 December 2018, he signed for FC Andorra in the Primera Catalana.

On 22 December 2021, after being a part of the squad who achieved an administrative promotion to Segunda División B in 2019 and later a qualification to the newly created Primera División RFEF in 2021, Vilanova renewed his contract with the Tricolors until 2024. He was a regular starter for the club during the campaign, scoring four goals in 32 appearances overall and achieving a first-ever promotion to Segunda División.

Vilanova made his professional debut on 15 August 2022, starting in a 1–0 away win over Real Oviedo.

On 23 July 2024, Vilanova signed with Alcorcón.

== Personal life ==
Vilanova's father Tito was also a footballer and later became a manager. He was also groomed at Barcelona, and managed the first team during the 2012–13 season.
