= Lee Sang-hyeok (footballer) =

South Korean footballer (born 2000)

Personal information
- Date of birth: 19 January 2000 (age 26)
- Place of birth: Daegu, South Korea
- Height: 1.77 m (5 ft 10 in)
- Position: Winger

Youth career
- Yulwon Middle School
- 2013–2018: Daegu

Senior career*
Years	Team	Apps	(Gls)
2019–2022	Pardubice	29	(0)
2022–2023	Cartagena	0	(0)
- * Club domestic league appearances and goals as of 19:38, 2 September 2022 (UTC)

- Lee Sang-hyeok
- Hangul: 이상혁
- RR: I Sanghyeok
- MR: I Sanghyŏk

Lee Sang-hyeok (Korean: 이상혁; born 19 January 2000) is a South Korean footballer who plays as a winger.

== Club career ==
A Daegu FC youth graduate, Lee only made his senior debut with FK Pardubice in the Fortuna národní liga, in 2019. He was also a part of the squad which won promotion to Fortuna liga in 2020, but was mainly used as a substitute.

On 1 September 2022, Lee signed a one-year contract with FC Cartagena in Spain.

== Career statistics ==
=== Club ===
As of 14 July 2020.

Club	Season	League			Cup		Other		Total	
Club	Season	Division	Apps	Goals	Apps	Goals	Apps	Goals	Apps	Goals
Pardubice	2018–19	Fortuna národní liga	8	0	0	0	0	0	8	0
Pardubice	2019–20	Fortuna národní liga	9	0	2	0	0	0	11	0
Pardubice	2020–21	Fortuna liga	8	0	1	0	0	0	9	0
Career total			20	0	0	0	0	0	8	0
