= Diego de Pedro =

Spanish footballer

Personal information
- Full name: Diego de Pedro Marroquí
- Date of birth: 3 February 2003 (age 23)
- Place of birth: Almoradí, Spain
- Position: Midfielder

Team information
- Current team: Alcoyano
- Number: 11

Youth career
- San Félix
- 2018–2021: Elche
- 2021–2022: Cartagena

Senior career*
| Years | Team | Apps | (Gls) |
| 2021–2024 | Cartagena B | 76 | (3) |
| 2021–2024 | Cartagena | 1 | (0) |
| 2024–2025 | Yeclano | 21 | (0) |
| 2025– | Alcoyano | 33 | (1) |
- * Club domestic league appearances and goals as of 7 May 2026

Diego de Pedro Marroquí (born 3 February 2003) is a Spanish professional footballer who plays as a midfielder for Segunda Federación club Alcoyano.

== Club career ==
Born in Almoradí, Alicante, Valencian Community, de Pedro represented CD San Félix and Elche CF as a youth before joining FC Cartagena on 30 June 2021, initially for the Juvenil squad. He made his senior debut with the reserves on 25 September, playing the last 30 minutes of a 4–0 Tercera División RFEF home routing of UD Los Garres.

De Pedro scored his first senior goal on 12 December 2021, netting the opener in a 3–0 away success over Cartagena FC. The following 28 January, he renewed his contract until 2024.

De Pedro made his first team debut on 8 April 2022, coming on as a second-half substitute for Julio Buffarini in a 0–1 away loss against CD Lugo in the Segunda División.
