= Arnau Solà =

Spanish footballer (born 2003)

Personal information
- Full name: Arnau Solà Mateu
- Date of birth: 4 April 2003 (age 23)
- Place of birth: Amposta, Spain
- Height: 1.79 m (5 ft 10 in)
- Position: Left-back

Team information
- Current team: Ibiza (on loan from Arouca)
- Number: 22

Youth career
- 2007–2010: Amposta
- 2010–2015: Rapitenca
- 2015–2022: Barcelona

Senior career*
Years	Team	Apps	(Gls)
2021–2022	Barcelona B	11	(0)
2022–2025	Almería	0	(0)
2022–2023	→ Murcia (loan)	26	(0)
2023–2024	→ Cartagena (loan)	18	(1)
2024–2025	→ Villarreal B (loan)	31	(0)
2024–2025	→ Villarreal (loan)	1	(0)
2025–	Arouca	10	(0)
2026–	→ Ibiza (loan)	16	(1)

International career
2021–2022	Spain U19	2	(0)
- * Club domestic league appearances and goals as of 26 May 2026

Arnau Solà Mateu (born 4 April 2003) is a Spanish professional footballer who plays as a left-back for Primera Federación club Ibiza, on loan from Primeira Liga side Arouca.

== Club career ==
=== Early career ===
Born in Amposta, Tarragona, Catalonia, Solà began his career with hometown side CF Amposta at the age of four. In 2010, aged seven, he moved to UE Rapitenca, and then joined FC Barcelona's La Masia in 2015, at the age of 12.

=== Barcelona ===
Solà was promoted to Barcelona's B team in July 2021, and made his senior debut on 28 August, coming on as a second-half substitute for Nils Mortimer in a 1–1 Primera División RFEF home draw against Algeciras CF. He spent the campaign playing both for the B's and the Juvenil side before being sidelined in February 2022, due to a spinal disc herniation: however, he still contributed to the victory of a national under-19 league title.

On 6 June 2022, Solà announced his departure from Barcelona after not renewing his contract, which would have expired at the end of the month.

=== Almería ===
On 7 July 2022, Solà joined La Liga side UD Almería on a permanent deal, signing a five-year contract.

==== Loan to Murcia ====
On 12 August, he joined Primera Federación side Real Murcia on loan for the entire season. He immediately became a starter for the side, being often deployed on the right flank.

==== Loan to Cartagena ====
On 20 July 2023, Solà was loaned out to Segunda División side FC Cartagena for one season. He made his professional debut on 18 August, starting in a 3–2 away loss to FC Andorra, and scored his first goal on 10 September, but in a 3–1 home loss to Real Zaragoza.

==== Loan to Villarreal ====
On 11 July 2024, Solà moved to Villarreal CF on a one-year loan deal, being assigned to the B-team in the third division. He made his first team – and La Liga – debut on 13 April of the following year, replacing Dani Parejo in a 2–1 away win over Real Betis.

=== Arouca ===
On 8 July 2025, Solà moved abroad for the first time in his career, agreeing to a three-year contract with Portuguese Primeira Liga side FC Arouca; he left Almería without making his debut for the club.

==== Loan to Ibiza ====
On 2 February 2026, Solà returned to Spain, joining Primera Federación club Ibiza on loan until the end of the season.

== International career ==
Solà has represented Spain at youth international level, having played for the under-19 national team.

== Career statistics ==
As of match played 24 May 2025

Appearances and goals by club, season and competition
Club	Season	League			Cup		Europe		Total	
Club	Season	Division	Apps	Goals	Apps	Goals	Apps	Goals	Apps	Goals
Barcelona B	2021–22	Primera Federación	11	0	—		—		11	0
Murcia (loan)	2022–23	Primera Federación	26	0	1	0	—		27	0
Cartagena (loan)	2023–24	Segunda División	18	1	0	0	—		18	1
Villareal B (loan)	2024–25	Primera Federación	31	0	—		—		31	0
Villarreal (loan)	2024–25	La Liga	1	0	0	0	—		1	0
Almería	2025–26	Segunda División	0	0	0	0	—		0	0
Career total			87	0	1	0	0	0	88	1

== Honours ==
Barcelona

- División de Honor Juvenil: 2021-22
- División de Honor Juvenil runners-up: 2020-21
