= Álvaro Martín (footballer) =

Spanish footballer

Personal information
- Full name: Álvaro Martín de Frías
- Date of birth: 15 January 2001 (age 25)
- Place of birth: Madrid, Spain
- Height: 1.73 m (5 ft 8 in)
- Position: Midfielder

Team information
- Current team: Castellón
- Number: 21

Youth career
- 2005–2009: Noblejas
- 2009–2012: Getafe
- 2012–2016: Real Madrid
- 2016–2017: Rayo Vallecano
- 2017–2020: Real Madrid

Senior career*
Years	Team	Apps	(Gls)
2020–2023	Real Madrid B	37	(4)
2020–2021	→ Šibenik (loan)	23	(0)
2021–2022	→ Internacional Madrid (loan)	35	(10)
2023–2026	Andorra	83	(5)
2026–	Castellón	9	(0)
- * Club domestic league appearances and goals as of 17 October 2026

Álvaro Martín de Frías (born 15 January 2001) is a Spanish professional footballer who plays as a midfielder for Segunda División club CD Castellón.

== Club career ==
Born in Madrid, Martín first joined Real Madrid's La Fábrica in 2012, from Getafe. Released in 2016, he spent a year at Rayo Vallecano before returning to Los Blancos in 2017.

On 1 October 2020, after finishing his formation, Martín was loaned to Prva HNL side Šibenik, for one year. He made his professional debut two days later, coming on as a second-half substitute for Emir Sahiti in a 0–2 home loss against Osijek.

On 18 August 2021, Martín moved to Primera División RFEF side Internacional de Madrid on loan for the season. He returned to Real Madrid in July 2022, after scoring 10 goals, and became a mainstay with the reserves also in the third division.

On 1 August 2023, Martín signed a three-year contract with Segunda División side FC Andorra, with Real Madrid retaining 50% over a future sale. On 19 June 2026, he agreed to a three-year deal with fellow league team CD Castellón.

== Career statistics ==
=== Club ===
As of 19 December 2023.

Appearances and goals by club, season and competition
Club	Season	League			National cup		Other		Total	
Club	Season	Division	Apps	Goals	Apps	Goals	Apps	Goals	Apps	Goals
Šibenik (loan)	2020–21	Prva liga	23	0	2	0	—		25	0
Internacional de Madrid (loan)	2021–22	Primera División RFEF	35	10	1	0	—		36	10
Real Madrid Castilla	2022–23	Primera Federación	37	4	—		4 (Note: Appearances in 2023 Primera Federación play-offs)	0	41	4
Andorra	2023–24	Segunda División	19	1	1	0	0	0	20	1
Career total			114	15	4	0	4	0	120	15

== Honours ==
Real Madrid

- UEFA Youth League: 2019–20
