= Iván Ayllón =

Spanish footballer

Personal information
- Full name: Iván Ayllón Descalzo
- Date of birth: 23 April 2001 (age 25)
- Place of birth: La Seca, Spain
- Height: 1.71 m (5 ft 7 in)
- Position: Winger

Team information
- Current team: Poblense
- Number: 20

Youth career
- Sur

Senior career*
Years	Team	Apps	(Gls)
2020–2022	Tordesillas	53	(16)
2022–2023	Cristo Atlético	16	(1)
2023–2024	Cartagena B	14	(3)
2023–2024	Cartagena	17	(2)
2024–2025	Real Unión	0	(0)
2025–2026	Talavera	3	(0)
2026–	Poblense	1	(0)
- * Club domestic league appearances and goals as of 8 May 2026

Iván Ayllón Descalzo (born 23 April 2001) is a Spanish footballer who plays as a winger for Segunda Federación club Poblense.

== Career ==
Born in La Seca, Valladolid, Castile and León, Ayllón was a UD Sur youth graduate. On 31 January 2020, he joined Tercera División side Atlético Tordesillas, and made his senior debut on 9 February, playing the last 21 minutes and scoring his team's only in a 4–1 home loss to CD Palencia Cristo Atlético.

Ayllón scored 14 goals for Tordesillas during the 2021–22 season, as the club narrowly missed out promotion from Tercera División RFEF. On 20 June 2022, he moved to Segunda Federación side Cristo Atlético.

On 26 January 2023, Ayllón signed for FC Cartagena and was assigned to the reserves also in the fourth division. He made his first team debut on 13 August, replacing Juan Carlos Real late into a 1–0 Segunda División home loss to CD Eldense, and scored his first professional goal five days later, netting his team's second in a 2–3 loss at FC Andorra.

On 22 July 2024, Ayllón signed for Real Unión.
