= Filip Dmitrović =

Serbian footballer

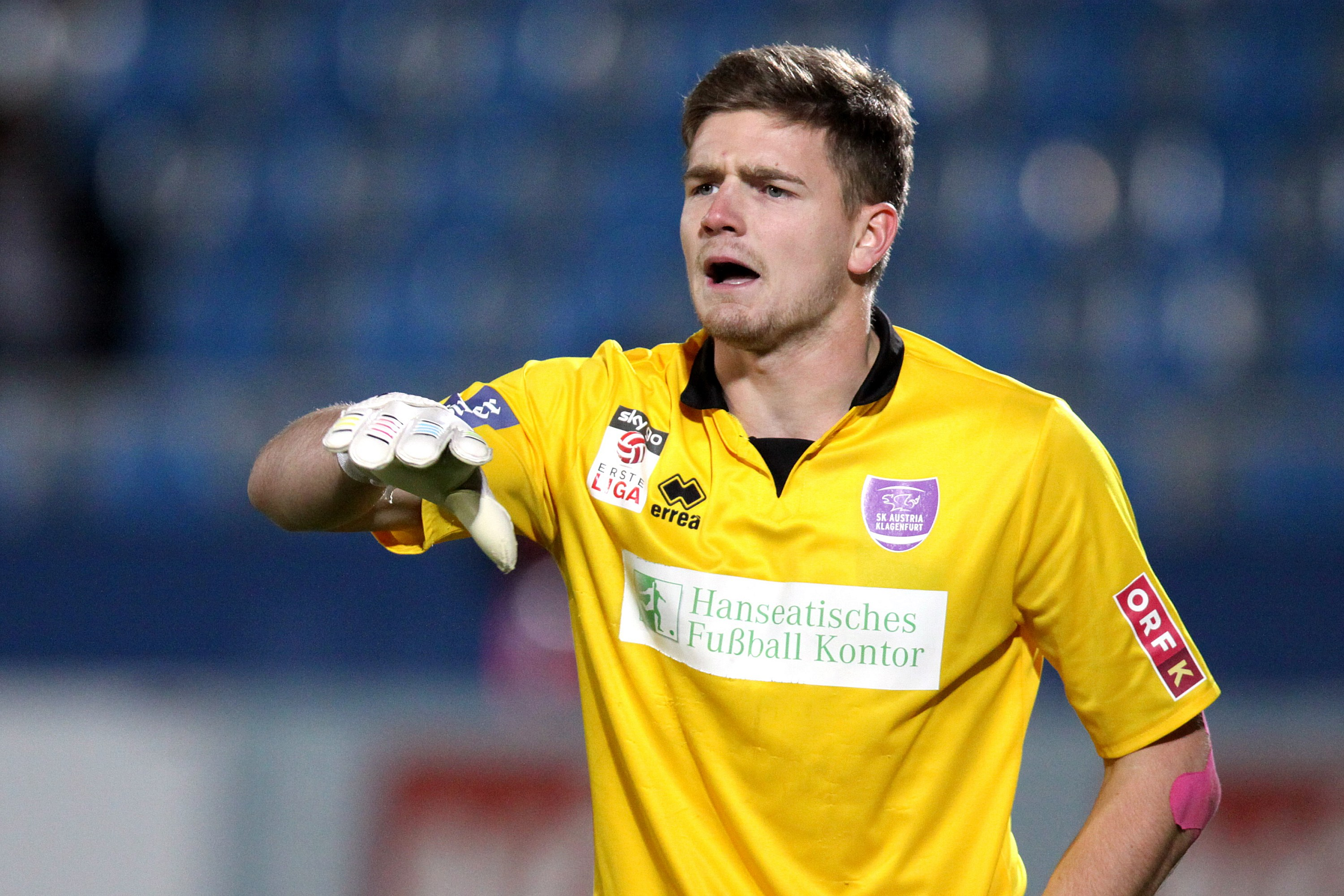
- Dmitrović playing for Austria Klagenfurt in 2015

Personal information
- Date of birth: 28 July 1995 (age 31)
- Place of birth: Kraljevo, Serbia
- Height: 1.91 m (6 ft 3 in)
- Position: Goalkeeper

Team information
- Current team: ASKÖ Oedt
- Number: 1

Youth career
- 2001–: Mariatrost
- Partizan
- –2010: Borac Čačak
- 2010–2012: Teleoptik Zemun

Senior career*
Years	Team	Apps	(Gls)
2012–2016	Austria Klagenfurt	75	(0)
2016–2018	LASK	19	(0)
2017	→ Juniors OÖ	3	(0)
2017	→ Rheindorf Altach (loan)	0	(0)
2018	→ St. Pölten (loan)	6	(0)
2018–2020	Ried	6	(0)
2020–2021	Enosis Aspropyrgos	9	(0)
2021	Anagennisi Karditsa	0	(0)
2022	FavAC	7	(0)
2022–2024	FC Traiskirchen	51	(0)
2024–	ASKÖ Oedt	27	(0)

International career
2015	Serbia U20	3	(0)
- * Club domestic league appearances and goals as of 27 June 2026

Filip Dmitrović (Serbian Cyrillic: филип Дмитровић; born 28 July 1995) is a Serbian footballer who plays as a goalkeeper for Austrian club ASKÖ Oedt.

== Club career ==
Dmitrović began his career in Graz, Austria at Mariatrost. Having played in Serbia at Partizan, Borac Čačak and Teleoptik Zemun, he returned to Austria for Austria Klagenfurt. In 2015 after the rise in professional football, he was in the first round on July 24, 2015 at 4:0 home win against Liefering his pro debut.

After the injury of Pavao Pervan, Dmitrović was committed from second division side LASK Linz on August 3, 2016. As with the Austria Klagenfurt he made his debut for the Black and Whites on August 5, 2016 away game against Liefering.

== International career ==
Dmitrović has represented the Serbia at the under-U20 level.

== Personal life ==
Dmitrović is the son of former Serbian international footballer Boban Dmitrović.

== Career statistics ==
As of match played 7 February 2018

Appearances and goals by club, season and competition
Club	Season	League			National Cup		League Cup		Continental		Other		Total	
Club	Season	Division	Apps	Goals	Apps	Goals	Apps	Goals	Apps	Goals	Apps	Goals	Apps	Goals
Austria Klagenfurt	2012–13	Regionalliga Mitte	3	0	0	0	—	—	0	0	0	0	3	0
Austria Klagenfurt	2013–14	Regionalliga Mitte	9	0	0	0	—	—	0	0	0	0	9	0
Austria Klagenfurt	2014–15	Regionalliga Mitte	26	0	1	0	—	—	0	0	2	0	29	0
Austria Klagenfurt	2015–16	Erste Liga	32	0	1	0	—	—	0	0	0	0	33	0
Austria Klagenfurt	Total		70	0	2	0	—	—	0	0	2	0	74	0
LASK Linz	2016–17	Erste Liga	19	0	2	0	—	—	0	0	0	0	10	0
LASK Linz	Total		19	0	2	0	—	—	0	0	0	0	11	0
Rheindorf Altach (loan)	2017–18	Austrian Bundesliga	0	0	3	0	—	—	0	0	0	0	3	0
Rheindorf Altach (loan)	Total		0	0	3	0	—	—	0	0	0	0	3	0
SKN St. Pölten (loan)	2017–18	Austrian Bundesliga	1	0	0	0	—	—	0	0	0	0	1	0
SKN St. Pölten (loan)	Total		1	0	0	0	—	—	0	0	0	0	1	0
Career total			92	0	7	0	—	—	0	0	0	0	99	0
