= Isak Jansson =

Swedish footballer

Personal information
- Full name: Isak Alexander Jansson
- Date of birth: 31 January 2002 (age 24)
- Place of birth: Kinna, Sweden
- Height: 1.75 m (5 ft 9 in)
- Positions: Winger; forward

Team information
- Current team: Nice
- Number: 21

Youth career
- 2007–2012: Kinna IF
- 2012–2018: Skene IF
- 2018–2019: Kalmar FF

Senior career*
Years	Team	Apps	(Gls)
2018	Skene IF	9	(0)
2019–2022	Kalmar FF	68	(7)
2022–2024	Cartagena	45	(3)
2024	→ Rapid Wien (loan)	11	(1)
2024–2025	Rapid Wien	22	(7)
2025–	Nice	26	(1)

International career^{‡}
2017–2019	Sweden U17	20	(2)
2022	Sweden U21	3	(0)
- * Club domestic league appearances and goals as of 18 October 2026 ‡ National team caps and goals as of 17:28, 16 October 2024 (UTC)

Isak Alexander Jansson (born 31 January 2002) is a Swedish professional footballer who plays as a winger or forward for Ligue 1 club Nice.

== Club career ==
Born in Kinna, Jansson represented Kinna IF and Skene IF as a youth. In May 2018, after already making his senior debut with the latter, he joined Kalmar FF.

After making his first team debut for Kalmar in 2019, Jansson established himself as a regular starter during the 2020 season onwards. He scored his first professional goal on 25 April 2021, netting the winner in a 1–0 home success over Örebro SK.

On 1 August 2022, Jansson moved abroad and signed a three-year contract with FC Cartagena of the Spanish Segunda División.

On 6 February 2024, he agreed to a short-term loan to Rapid Wien. Later that year, on 28 May, the club announced that his transfer had been made permanent, with a contract running until 2028.

On 10 July 2025, Jansson signed for Ligue 1 side Nice, for a reported fee of €7m plus add-ons.

== Career statistics ==
=== Club ===
As of 18 October 2026

Appearances and goals by club, season and competition
Club	Season	League			Cup		Continental		Other		Total	
Club	Season	Division	Apps	Goals	Apps	Goals	Apps	Goals	Apps	Goals	Apps	Goals
Skene IF	2018	Division 3 Sydvästra Götaland	9	0	—		—		—		9	0
Kalmar FF	2019	Allsvenskan	1	0	0	0	—		—		1	0
Kalmar FF	2020	Allsvenskan	29	0	2 (Note: Appearance(s) in Svenska Cupen)	2	—		2 (Note: Appearance(s) in the play-offs)	0	33	2
Kalmar FF	2021	Allsvenskan	24	6	3	0	—		—		27	6
Kalmar FF	2022	Allsvenskan	14	1	3	0	—		—		17	1
Kalmar FF	Total		68	7	8	2	—		2	0	78	9
Cartagena	2022–23	Segunda División	27	2	3	0	—		—		30	2
Cartagena	2023–24	Segunda División	18	1	1	0	—		—		19	1
Cartagena	Total		45	3	4	0	—		—		49	3
Rapid Wien (loan)	2023–24	Austrian Bundesliga	11	1	1	0	0	0	—		12	1
Rapid Wien	2024–25	Austrian Bundesliga	22	7	0	0	11 (Note: Six appearances in UEFA Europa League, five appearances in UEFA Conference League)	2	—		33	9
Nice	2025–26	Ligue 1	22	1	1	0	6 (Note: Two appearances in UEFA Champions League, four appearances in UEFA Europa League)	0	2 (Note: Appearances in Ligue 1 relegation/promotion play-offs)	0	31	1
Nice	2026–27	Ligue 1	4	0	0	0	—		—		4	0
Nice	Total		26	1	1	0	6	0	2	0	35	1
Career total			181	19	14	2	17	2	4	0	216	23

== Honours ==
Nice

- Coupe de France runner-up: 2025–26
