= Jandro Orellana =

Spanish footballer

Personal information
- Full name: Alejandro Orellana Gómez
- Date of birth: 7 August 2000 (age 26)
- Place of birth: Gavà, Spain
- Height: 1.76 m (5 ft 9 in)
- Position: Defensive midfielder

Team information
- Current team: Cádiz

Youth career
- 2008–2012: Gavà
- 2012–2014: Espanyol
- 2014–2019: Barcelona

Senior career*
| Years | Team | Apps | (Gls) |
| 2018–2022 | Barcelona B | 70 | (1) |
| 2022–2024 | Andorra | 57 | (1) |
| 2024–2026 | Estoril | 44 | (1) |
| 2026– | Cádiz | 0 | (0) |

International career
| 2017–2018 | Spain U17 | 8 | (0) |
| 2018–2019 | Spain U19 | 11 | (1) |
- * Club domestic league appearances and goals as of 22 August 2026

Alejandro "Jandro" Orellana Gómez (born 7 August 2000) is a Spanish professional footballer who plays for Cádiz CF.

== Club career ==
Born in Gavà, Barcelona, Catalonia, Orellana joined FC Barcelona's La Masia in 2014, after representing RCD Espanyol and CF Gavà's youth setup EF Gavà. He made his senior debut with the reserves on 4 November 2018, coming on as a late substitute for Riqui Puig in a 1–1 Segunda División B home draw against CD Ebro.

Orellana scored his first senior goal on 24 January 2021, netting the opener through a free kick in a 2–1 home win against UE Olot. On 31 August, he renewed his contract with the club for a further year.

On 22 July 2022, free agent Orellana signed a three-year deal with Segunda División newcomers FC Andorra. He made his professional debut on 20 August, replacing Marc Aguado late into a 4–1 away loss against Sporting de Gijón.

On 8 July 2024, Orellana moved abroad for the first time in his career, signing a three-year contract with Primeira Liga side GD Estoril Praia. On 25 August 2026, he returned to Spain and its second division, agreeing to a four-year deal with Cádiz CF.
