= CD Alcoyano =

Association football club in Spain

Alcoyano
- Full name: Club Deportivo Alcoyano
- Nickname: Deportivo
- Founded: 13 September 1928; 98 years ago
- Ground: El Collao, Alcoy, Valencian Community, Spain
- Capacity: 4,850
- President: Txiqui Linares
- Head coach: Juan Francisco Alcoy
- League: Segunda Federación – Group 3
- 2025–26: Segunda Federación – Group 3, 5th of 18
Home colours	Away colours

Club Deportivo Alcoyano, S.A.D. is a Spanish football team based in Alcoy, in the autonomous community of Valencia. Founded in 1928, it plays in Segunda Federación – Group 3, holding home games in Estadio El Collao, with a capacity of 4,850 seats.

== History ==
The city of Alcoy had a very important club, the Boxing Club Deportivo Alcoyano. In 1927 its football section won a large number of games against major clubs which led to the formation of the football club. Club Deportivo Alcoyano saw the light in 1928, after a merger between two clubs in the city, Levante and Racing. However, it only joined the Royal Spanish Football Federation four years later.

In 1942, the club first reached the Segunda División, going on to alternate between that level and the top flight in the subsequent years. Their debut in the latter took place with a 2–3 home loss against Real Murcia, in an eventual relegation, as second from bottom. In that season the club got only 8 points and conceded 28 goals in 14 games played, the worst result among 8 teams. For the first time in history Alcoyano reached La Liga, first Spanish division, in 1945 by winning Segunda División.

In 1947–48, Alcoyano maintained its first division status for the only time in its history, even finishing higher than Real Madrid. That season was the best in Alcoyano's history – the club finished in 10th position in La Liga. The following forty years, however, were spent mainly in the third and fourth divisions, with very brief spells in level two. In the 1953–54 season Alcoyano was relegated to the Tercera División for the first time in its history. In the 1954–55 season the club reached first place in the Group 10 of Tercera División, but failed to promote back to Segunda División B.

Alcoyano returned to the third category for 2004–05, consistently reached the promotion play-offs, and consistently failed to be promoted. In the 2005–06 season, the team also had a good run in the Spanish Cup, beating RCD Mallorca 4–1 and losing by just one goal (0–1) in the fourth round against Atlético Madrid.

In June 2011, 42 years after, Alcoyano finally returned to the second division, after finishing in third position in the regular season, and disposing of Real Madrid Castilla, SD Eibar and CD Lugo in the promotion playoffs. However, the club spent only one season in the second division and relegated back to Segunda División B. On 1 August 2014, the club completed the transformation process into "Public Limited Sports Company" (Sociedad Anónima Deportiva).

In the 2018–19 season, Alcoyano club finished 16th in the Segunda División B, Group 3, close to the relegation place.

On 20 January 2021, Alcoyano made history by eliminating Spanish giants and reigning La Liga champions Real Madrid from the 2020–21 Copa del Rey, beating them 2–1 at home.

== Season to season ==
Season	Level	Division	Place	Copa del Rey
1941–42	3	1ª Reg.	1st	
1942–43	2	2ª	8th	
1943–44	2	2ª	4th	
1944–45	2	2ª	1st	
1945–46	1	1ª	13th	
1946–47	2	2ª	1st	
1947–48	1	1ª	10th	Sixth round
1948–49	1	1ª	13th	Fifth round
1949–50	2	2ª	1st	
1950–51	1	1ª	15th	
1951–52	2	2ª	3rd	
1952–53	2	2ª	7th	
1953–54	2	2ª	14th	
1954–55	3	3ª	1st	
1955–56	3	3ª	4th	
1956–57	3	3ª	1st	
1957–58	2	2ª	18th	
1958–59	3	3ª	5th	
1959–60	3	3ª	6th	
1960–61	3	3ª	3rd	

Season	Level	Division	Place	Copa del Rey
1961–62	3	3ª	2nd	
1962–63	3	3ª	2nd	
1963–64	3	3ª	9th	
1964–65	3	3ª	3rd	
1965–66	3	3ª	6th	
1966–67	3	3ª	1st	
1967–68	2	2ª	3rd	
1968–69	2	2ª	13th	
1969–70	3	3ª	3rd	
1970–71	3	3ª	6th	
1971–72	3	3ª	4th	
1972–73	3	3ª	7th	
1973–74	3	3ª	16th	
1974–75	4	Reg. Pref.	2nd	
1975–76	4	Reg. Pref.	2nd	
1976–77	4	Reg. Pref.	2nd	
1977–78	4	3ª	4th	
1978–79	4	3ª	4th	
1979–80	4	3ª	10th	
1980–81	4	3ª	5th	

Season	Level	Division	Place	Copa del Rey
1981–82	4	3ª	1st	
1982–83	3	2ª B	7th	
1983–84	3	2ª B	8th	
1984–85	3	2ª B	8th	
1985–86	3	2ª B	5th	
1986–87	3	2ª B	12th	
1987–88	3	2ª B	10th	
1988–89	3	2ª B	9th	
1989–90	3	2ª B	4th	
1990–91	3	2ª B	4th	
1991–92	3	2ª B	9th	
1992–93	3	2ª B	14th	
1993–94	3	2ª B	9th	
1994/95	3	2ª B	8th	
1995–96	3	2ª B	17th	
1996–97	4	3ª	1st	
1997–98	4	3ª	7th	
1998–99	4	3ª	3rd	
1999–2000	4	3ª	12th	
2000–01	4	3ª	17th	

Season	Level	Division	Place	Copa del Rey
2001–02	4	3ª	10th	
2002–03	4	3ª	5th	
2003–04	4	3ª	2nd	
2004–05	3	2ª B	7th	
2005–06	3	2ª B	5th	Fourth round
2006–07	3	2ª B	3rd	Third round
2007–08	3	2ª B	9th	Round of 32
2008–09	3	2ª B	1st	
2009–10	3	2ª B	4th	Round of 32
2010–11	3	2ª B	3rd	Second round
2011–12	2	2ª	21st	Third round
2012–13	3	2ª B	4th	Round of 32
2013–14	3	2ª B	6th	First round
2014–15	3	2ª B	6th	Round of 32
2015–16	3	2ª B	6th	First round
2016–17	3	2ª B	2nd	Second round
2017–18	3	2ª B	13th	Second round
2018–19	3	2ª B	16th	
2019–20	4	3ª	1st	
2020–21	3	2ª B	2nd / 5th	Round of 16

Season	Level	Division	Place	Copa del Rey
2021–22	3	1ª RFEF	11th	Round of 32
2022–23	3	1ª Fed.	15th	
2023–24	3	1ª Fed.	11th	
2024–25	3	1ª Fed.	18th	
2025–26	4	2ª Fed.	5th	
2026–27	4	2ª Fed.		TBD

- 4 seasons in La Liga
- 12 seasons in Segunda División
- 4 seasons in Primera Federación/Primera División RFEF
- 2 seasons in Segunda Federación
- 29 seasons in Segunda División B
- 31 seasons in Tercera División

== Current squad ==
As of 10 February 2026.

Note: Flags indicate national team as defined under FIFA eligibility rules; some limited exceptions apply. Players may hold more than one non-FIFA nationality.

No.	Pos.	Nation	Player
1	GK	ESP	Unai Marino
3	FW	ESP	Steven Prieto
4	DF	ESP	José Solbes
5	DF	ESP	Raúl González
6	DF	ESP	Adolfo Romero
7	DF	ESP	Loren Fernández
8	DF	ESP	Pablo Carbonell
9	FW	ESP	Joan Piera
10	MF	ESP	Adrián Lledó
11	FW	ESP	Diego de Pedro
12	MF	ESP	Ale Morales
13	GK	ESP	Marcos Leganés
14	FW	ESP	Guille Andrés

No.	Pos.	Nation	Player
15	DF	ESP	Fran Moreno
16	DF	ESP	Javi Soler
17	FW	ESP	Sergio Chinchilla
18	MF	GEO	Lado Mokhevishvili
19	FW	FRA	Kalilou Camara
20	FW	ESP	Tiko Iniesta
21	DF	ESP	Izan Llinares
22	DF	ESP	Álex Alonso
23	MF	ESP	Víctor Sala
24	FW	ESP	Rubén Carretero
25	GK	ESP	Abel Gambín
—	GK	ESP	Jagoba Zárraga

== Famous players ==
Note: this list includes players that have played at least 100 league games and/or have reached international status.

- (Equatorial Guinea) Anselmo
- (Equatorial Guinea) Sergio Barila
- (Equatorial Guinea) Raúl Fabiani
- (Honduras) Anthony Lozano
- (Spain) Antonio Calpe
- (Spain) Manuel Carrión
- (Spain) Jorge Devesa
- (Spain) Manuel Gato
- (Spain) Diego Jiménez
- (Spain) Fernando Maestro
- (Spain) Víctor Sanjuán
- (Spain) David Porras
- (Venezuela) Miku

== Famous coaches ==
- (Spain) Juande Ramos
- (Spain) Manuel Ruiz Sosa
