= Alfredo Ortuño =

Spanish footballer (born 1991)

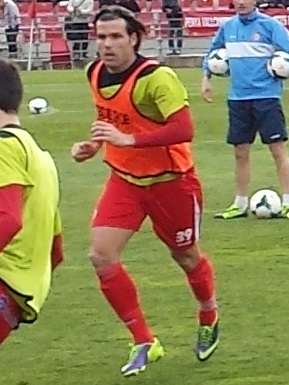

Personal information
- Full name: Alfredo Ortuño Martínez
- Date of birth: 21 January 1991 (age 35)
- Place of birth: Yecla, Spain
- Height: 1.84 m (6 ft 0 in)
- Position: Forward

Team information
- Current team: Cartagena
- Number: 9

Youth career
- 2008–2009: Albacete

Senior career*
Years	Team	Apps	(Gls)
2008–2011	Albacete	25	(0)
2009–2010	Albacete B	20	(6)
2011–2012	Getafe B	31	(4)
2012–2013	Levante B	31	(5)
2013–2014	La Hoya Lorca	18	(8)
2014–2015	Granada	5	(0)
2014	→ Girona (loan)	20	(9)
2015	→ Las Palmas (loan)	18	(4)
2015–2017	Las Palmas	0	(0)
2015–2016	→ Zaragoza (loan)	20	(7)
2016	→ Mallorca (loan)	19	(4)
2016–2017	→ Cádiz (loan)	42	(17)
2017	Valladolid	0	(0)
2018	Real Salt Lake	3	(0)
2018–2021	Albacete	52	(8)
2019	→ Extremadura (loan)	16	(2)
2019–2020	→ Oviedo (loan)	38	(14)
2021–	Cartagena	184	(29)
- * Club domestic league appearances and goals as of 14:53, 2 July 2026 (UTC)

Alfredo Ortuño Martínez (born 21 January 1991) is a Spanish professional footballer who plays as a forward for Primera Federación club Cartagena.

== Club career ==
Born in Yecla, Region of Murcia, Ortuño graduated from Albacete Balompié's youth setup. On 20 December 2008, while still a junior, he played his first match as a professional, coming on as a second-half substitute in a 3–0 away loss against UD Las Palmas in the Segunda División.

In summer 2010, Ortuño was definitely promoted to the main squad, but appeared rarely as the Castilla-La Mancha side dropped down a level. On 11 July 2011, he moved to Getafe CF B of Segunda División B, and continued to compete at that level the following seasons, representing Levante UD B and La Hoya Lorca CF.

Ortuño joined Granada CF from La Liga on 17 January 2014, being immediately loaned to Girona FC. He scored his first professional goal on the 25th, his team's in a 1–1 home draw against SD Eibar. He finished the campaign as club top scorer alongside Gerard Bordas, as the Catalans narrowly avoided relegation from the second division.

On 28 July 2014, Ortuño signed a new contract with Granada running until 2018. He played his first game in the Spanish top flight on 23 August, featuring 45 minutes in a 2–1 home win over Deportivo de La Coruña.

On 16 January 2015, Ortuño was loaned to Las Palmas until June. After winning promotion to the top flight he was bought outright for €1 million, signing a contract until 2019 but being loaned to second-tier Real Zaragoza on 21 July.

After an unassuming six-month spell at RCD Mallorca in 2016, Ortuño joined fellow division two club Cádiz CF on 4 August of that year, on loan. He scored a career-best 17 goals during the season, including braces against Getafe CF, AD Alcorcón and Córdoba CF.

Ortuño cut ties with Las Palmas on 2 September 2017, and agreed to a one-year deal at Real Valladolid the following day. Late in the month, however, he unilaterally terminated his contract with the latter, triggering a clause which meant he would not be able to compete in the Spanish second division that season.

On 3 January 2018, the 27-year-old Ortuño moved abroad for the first time in his career and signed with Major League Soccer's Real Salt Lake. He was released on 23 July, and joined his first club Albacete on a three-year deal just hours later.

On 30 January 2019, Ortuño was loaned to Extremadura UD also in the second division until June. On 6 August, he moved to Real Oviedo of the same league again in a temporary deal.

Back to Alba after scoring 14 goals for the Asturians, Ortuño was their top scorer with seven but could not prevent relegation. On 18 July 2021, he signed a one-year contract with FC Cartagena still in division two.

== Personal life ==
Ortuño's younger brother, Juan Tomás, was also a footballer and a forward. He too was brought up at Albacete.
