= 2026–27 Villarreal CF season =

127th season of Villarreal CF

Villarreal
2026–27 season
- President: Fernando Roig
- Head coach: Iñigo Pérez
- Stadium: Estadio de la Cerámica
- La Liga: 9th
- Copa del Rey: First round
- UEFA Champions League: League phase
Home colours	Away colours	Third colours

The 2026–27 season is the 104th season in the history of Villarreal Club de Fútbol, and the club's 14th consecutive season in La Liga. In addition to the domestic league, Villarreal is participating in this season's editions of the Copa del Rey and the UEFA Champions League. The season covers the period from 1 July 2026 to 30 June 2027.

== Players ==
=== First-team squad ===
As of 1 September 2026

Note: Flags indicate national team as defined under FIFA eligibility rules; some limited exceptions apply. Players may hold more than one non-FIFA nationality.

No.	Pos.	Nation	Player
1	GK	BRA	Luiz Júnior
2	DF	CPV	Logan Costa
3	DF	USA	Alex Freeman
5	MF	SEN	Alassane Diatta
6	DF	ESP	Pau Navarro
7	FW	ESP	Gerard Moreno (captain)
8	DF	ARG	Juan Foyth (3rd captain)
9	FW	GEO	Georges Mikautadze
10	MF	ESP	Alberto Moleiro
11	FW	MAR	Ilias Akhomach
12	DF	POR	Renato Veiga
13	GK	ESP	Rubén Gómez

No.	Pos.	Nation	Player
14	MF	ESP	Santi Comesaña (vice-captain)
15	DF	URU	Santiago Mouriño
16	MF	ESP	Carlos Maciá
17	MF	CAN	Tajon Buchanan
18	MF	SEN	Pape Gueye
19	FW	CIV	Nicolas Pépé
20	DF	ESP	Carlos Romero
21	FW	CAN	Tani Oluwaseyi
22	FW	ESP	Ayoze Pérez
23	DF	ESP	Sergi Cardona (4th captain)
24	MF	CAN	Nathan Saliba
25	GK	HUN	Péter Gulácsi

=== Reserve team ===
Note: Flags indicate national team as defined under FIFA eligibility rules; some limited exceptions apply. Players may hold more than one non-FIFA nationality.

No.	Pos.	Nation	Player
30	MF	SEN	Cheikh Thiam

=== Out on loan ===
Note: Flags indicate national team as defined under FIFA eligibility rules; some limited exceptions apply. Players may hold more than one non-FIFA nationality.

No.	Pos.	Nation	Player
—	GK	ESP	Arnau Tenas (at Mallorca until 30 June 2027)
—	GK	ESP	Diego Conde (at Real Betis until 30 June 2027)
—	DF	ESP	Dani Budesca (at Córdoba until 30 June 2027)
—	DF	CIV	Jean Ives Valou (at Getafe until 30 June 2027)

No.	Pos.	Nation	Player
—	DF	COD	Willy Kambwala (at Como until 30 June 2027)
—	MF	ESP	Dani Requena (at Levante until 30 June 2027)
—	FW	ARG	Thiago Fernández (at Levante until 30 June 2027)
—	FW	ESP	Hugo López (at Andorra until 30 June 2027)

== Transfers ==
=== In ===
Pos.	Player	Transferred from	Fee	Date	Source
GK	(Hungary) Péter Gulácsi	(Germany) RB Leipzig	Transfer	3 August 2026	
MF	(Canada) Nathan Saliba	(Belgium) Anderlecht	Transfer	25 August 2026	

=== Out ===
Pos.	Player	Transferred to	Fee	Date	Source
MF	(Spain) Dani Parejo		End of contract	30 June 2026	
MF	(Ghana) Thomas Partey	(Saudi Arabia) Al-Shabab	End of contract	30 June 2026	
DF	(Spain) Alfonso Pedraza	(Italy) Lazio	End of contract	30 June 2026	
GK	(Spain) Diego Conde	(Spain) Real Betis	Loan	20 July 2026	
GK	(Spain) Arnau Tenas	(Spain) Mallorca	Loan	25 July 2026	

== Pre-season ==
17 July 2026 Friendly	Benfica	2–0	Villarreal	Faro/Loulé, Portugal
19:30 WEST	Rafa 53'; Enzo (yellow card) 55'; Pavlidis 76'	Report	(yellow card) 31' Moreno	Stadium: Estádio Algarve

25 July 2026 Friendly	PSV	1–3	Villarreal

29 July 2026 Como Cup	Como	1–1 (1–3 p)	Villarreal	Como, Italy
22:00 CEST (UTC+2)	Liberali 27'	Report	Moleiro 30'	Stadium: Stadio Giuseppe Sinigaglia
	Penalties
	Da Cunha (penalty missed); Douvikas (penalty scored)		(penalty scored) Gerard; (penalty scored) Moleiro; (penalty scored) Mikautadze
Note: The match was 45 minutes long.

29 July 2026	Al-Ula	0–3	Villarreal

1 August 2026	Lens	3–1	Villarreal

5 August 2026	Villarreal	1–0	Levante UD

8 August 2026 Friendly	Galatasaray	1–2	Villarreal	Istanbul, Turkey
21:00 TRT (UTC+3)	Osimhen 5', (yellow card) 39'; Sallai (yellow card) 68'	Report 1 Report 2 Report 3	Pérez 3' (pen.); Mouriño (yellow card) 39'; Mikautadze 41'	Stadium: Rams Park; Attendance: 16,519

== Competitions ==
=== Overall record ===
Competition	First match	Last match	Starting round	Final position	Record							
Competition	First match	Last match	Starting round	Final position	Pld	W	D	L	GF	GA	GD	Win %
La Liga	August 16, 2026	May 28–30, 2027	Matchday 1	TBD	7	2	2	3	13	12	+1	28.57
Copa del Rey	October 2026	TBD	First round	TBD	0	0	0	0	0	0	+0	—
UEFA Champions League	September 8, 2026	TBD	League phase	TBD	1	0	0	1	2	3	−1	0.00
Total					8	2	2	4	15	15	+0	25.00

Last updated: 20 September 2026
Source: Soccerway

=== La Liga ===
==== League table ====
Pos	Team	Pld	W	D	L	GF	GA	GD	Pts
8	Athletic Bilbao	12	4	4	4	15	12	+3	16
9	Alavés	13	4	4	5	18	18	0	16
10	Villarreal	13	4	3	6	19	18	+1	15
11	Espanyol	13	4	3	6	14	14	0	15
12	Deportivo A Coruña	13	3	6	4	16	17	−1	15

Updated to match(es) played on 22 November 2026. Source: LaLiga EA Sports
Rules for classification: 1) Points; 2) Head-to-head points; 3) Head-to-head goal difference; 4) Goal difference; 5) Goals scored; 6) Fair-play points (if three or more teams tied); 7) Play-off at neutral site.
(Note: Head-to-head record is used only after all the matches between the teams in question have been played)

==== Results summary ====
Overall								Home						Away					
Pld	W	D	L	GF	GA	GD	Pts	W	D	L	GF	GA	GD	W	D	L	GF	GA	GD
11	3	3	5	15	15	0	12	1	1	3	6	7	−1	2	2	2	9	8	+1

Last updated: 30 October 2026.
Source: Soccerway

==== Results by round ====
Round	1	2	3	4	5	6	7	8	9	10	11	12	13	14	15	16	17	18	19	20	21	22	23	24	25	26	27	28	29	30	31	32	33	34	35	36	37	38
Ground	A	A	A	H	H	A	H	A	H	A	H	H	A	A	H	H	A	H	A	H	A	H	A	H	H	A	H	A	H	A	H	A	H	A	H	A	H	A
Result	D	D	L	L	L	W	W	L	D	W	L																											
Position	6	9	15	17	18	14	9																															
Points	1	2	2	2	2	5	8	8	9	12	12																											

Updated to match(es) played on 30 October 2026. Source: La Liga
A = Away; H = Home; W = Win; D = Draw; L = Loss; P = Postponed

==== Matches ====
16 August 2026 1	Racing Santander	2–2	Villarreal	Santander
17:00 CEST (UTC+2)	Martín 21' (pen.); Canales 34'; Puerta (yellow card) 45+4'; Ramón (yellow card) 75'	Report	Gueye 45', (yellow card) 72'; Pépé 45+1'; Foyth (yellow card) 49'; Mouriño (yellow card) 87'; Romero (yellow card) 90+3'	Stadium: El Sardinero; Attendance: 22,413; Referee: Miguel Sesma Espinosa

23 August 2026 2	Atlético Madrid	2–2	Villarreal	Madrid
17:00 CEST (UTC+2)	Baena (yellow card) 54'; Pubill 59'; Hjulmand (yellow card) 76'; Le Normand (red card) 76'; Simeone 85'; Giménez (yellow card) 90+1'	Report	Mouriño (yellow card) 50'; Gerard 66' (pen.); Mikautadze 78' (pen.)	Stadium: Riyadh Air Metropolitano; Attendance: 61,978; Referee: Alejandro Hernández Hernández

28 August 2026 3	Alavés	1–0	Villarreal	Vitoria-Gasteiz
21:30 CEST (UTC+2)	Boyé 31'; Rebbach (yellow card) 48'; Mariano (yellow card) 89'; Sivera (yellow card) 90+2'	Report	Pépé (yellow card) 86'; Veiga (yellow card) 90+2'	Stadium: Mendizorrotza; Attendance: 15,556; Referee: Isidro Díaz de Mera Escuderos

5 September 2026 4	Villarreal	2–3	Deportivo A Coruña	Villarreal
21:00 CEST (UTC+2)	Pépé 19'; Traoré 76' (o.g.); Comesaña (yellow card) 81'; Buchanan (yellow card) 87'	Report	Cruz 43'; Eddahchouri 79'; Aubameyang 88'; Amatucci (yellow card) 90+1'; Yeremay (yellow card) 90+3'	Stadium: Estadio de la Cerámica; Attendance: 18,302; Referee: Jesús Gil Manzano

14 September 2026 5	Villarreal	1–2	Real Betis	Villarreal
21:00 CEST (UTC+2)	Gerard 29'; Veiga (yellow card) 84'	Report	Hernández 39'; Natan 43'	Stadium: Estadio de la Cerámica; Attendance: 18,267; Referee: Francisco José Hernández Maeso

17 September 2026 6	Málaga	1–3	Villarreal	Málaga
21:30 CEST (UTC+2)	Dotor 12'; Salinas (yellow card) 34'; Larrubia (yellow card) 68'; Galilea (yellow card) 70'; Ramón (yellow card) 79'; Herrero (yellow card) 85'	Report	Moleiro 40'; Akhomach (yellow card) 42'; Gueye 45+2', 86' (pen.)	Stadium: La Rosaleda; Attendance: 28,505; Referee: Miguel Ángel Ortiz Arias

20 September 2026 7	Villarreal	3–1	Levante	Villarreal
18:30 CEST (UTC+2)	Pérez 41'; Moleiro 54'; Buchanan (yellow card) 79'; Mikautadze 86'	Report	Mandi (yellow card) 13'; Romero 42'	Stadium: Estadio de la Cerámica; Attendance: 18,671; Referee: Mateo Busquets Ferrer

10 October 2026 8	Real Madrid	1–0	Villarreal	Madrid
21:00 CEST (UTC+2)	Bellingham (yellow card) 19'; Diomande 62'; Vinícius (red card) 73'; Konaté (yellow card) 81'; Rüdiger (yellow card) 83'; Tchouaméni (yellow card) 87'; Mbappé (yellow card) 90+4'	Report	Veiga (yellow card) 10'; Navarro (yellow card) 84'	Stadium: Bernabéu; Referee: Isidro Díaz de Mera Escuderos

17 October 2026 9	Villarreal	0–0	Elche	Villarreal
15:15 CEST (UTC+02:00)	Freeman (yellow card) 81'; Foyth (yellow card) 90+1'	Report	Villar (yellow card) 38'; Morente (yellow card) 71'; Revivo (yellow card) 75'; Chust (yellow card) 90+1'	Stadium: Estadio de la Cerámica; Referee: Víctor García Verdura

24 October 2026 10	Valencia	1–2	Villarreal	Valencia
18:30 CEST (UTC+2)	Raba (yellow card) 34'; Pepelu 38' (pen.); Maffeo (yellow card) 60'; Rodríguez (yellow card) 62'; Elliott (yellow card) 89' (red card) 89'		Veiga (yellow card) 37'; Pérez (yellow card) 43'; Buchanan (yellow card) 59'; Freeman 69'; Gueye (red card) 79'; Mikautadze 90+6'	Stadium: Mestalla; Referee: Alejandro Quintero González

30 October 2026 11	Villarreal	0–1	Espanyol	Villarreal
21:00 CET (UTC+1)	Cardona (yellow card) 53'; Comesaña (yellow card) 56'; Maciá (yellow card) 90+1'		Bauzà (yellow card) 21'; Hinojo (yellow card) 41'; Cabrera 60'; Zaragoza (yellow card) 75'	Stadium: Estadio de la Cerámica; Referee: José María Sánchez Martínez

8 November 2026 12	Villarreal	2–0	Getafe	Villarreal
	Comesaña (yellow card) 67'; Veiga (yellow card) 76'; Buchanan 80'; Romero 90+1'	Report	Martín (yellow card) 32'; Gudelj (yellow card) 62'	Stadium: Estadio de la Cerámica; Referee: Carlos Muñiz Muñoz

22 November 2026 13	Barcelona	3–2	Villarreal	Barcelona
14:00 CET (UTC+1)	Yamal (penalty missed) 23'; Martín 57'; Fermín 61' (red card) 75'; Navarro 67' (o.g.); Raphinha (yellow card) 76'; Bernal (yellow card) 80'	Report	Buchanan 5'; Oluwaseyi 7'; Gueye (yellow card) 11'; Moleiro (yellow card) 32'; Navarro (yellow card) 47' (yellow-red card) 90+3'; Freeman (yellow card) 49'; Romero (yellow card) 63'	Stadium: Camp Nou; Referee: Alejandro Hernández Hernández

29 November 2026 14	Celta Vigo	v	Villarreal	Abanca-Balaídos

6 December 2026 15	Villarreal	v	Real Sociedad	Villarreal
				Stadium: Estadio de la Cerámica

13 December 2026 16	Villarreal	v	Rayo Vallecano	Villarreal
				Stadium: Estadio de la Cerámica

20 December 2026 17	Osasuna	v	Villarreal	Pamplona
				Stadium: El Sadar

3 January 2027 18	Villarreal	v	Sevilla	Villarreal
				Stadium: Estadio de la Cerámica

10 January 2027 19	Athletic Bilbao	v	Villarreal	Bilbao
				Stadium: San Mamés

17 January 2027 20	Villarreal	v	Alavés	Villarreal
				Stadium: Estadio de la Cerámica

24 January 2027 21	Espanyol	v	Villarreal	Cornellà de Llobregat
				Stadium: RCDE Stadium

31 January 2027 22	Villarreal	v	Racing Santander	Villarreal
				Stadium: Estadio de la Cerámica

7 February 2027 23	Getafe	v	Villarreal	Getafe
				Stadium: Coliseum

14 February 2027 24	Villarreal	v	Barcelona	Villarreal
				Stadium: Estadio de la Cerámica

21 February 2027 25	Villarreal	v	Valencia	Villarreal
				Stadium: Estadio de la Cerámica

28 February 2027 26	Real Betis	v	Villarreal

7 March 2027 27	Villarreal	v	Real Madrid

14 March 2027 28	Elche	v	Villarreal

21 March 2027 29	Villarreal	v	Málaga CF

4 April 2027 30	Deportivo de A Coruña	v	Villarreal

11 April 2027 31	Villarreal	v	Athletic Bilbao

18 April 2027 32	Levante	v	Villarreal

21 April 2027 33	Villarreal	v	Atlético Madrid

2 May 2027 34	Rayo Vallecano	v	Villarreal

9 May 2027 35	Villarreal	v	Celta

16 May 2027 36	Sevilla	v	Villarreal

23 May 2027 37	Villarreal	v	Osasuna

30 May 2027 38	Real Sociedad	v	Villarreal

=== Copa del Rey ===
27 October 2026	Manacor	0–5	Villarreal	Manacor
21:00		Report	Diatta 13'; Oluwaseyi 26'; Cardona 47'; Nizar 55'; Pépé 68'	Stadium: Na Capellera

=== UEFA Champions League ===
==== League phase ====
The draw for the league phase was held on 27 August 2026.

Pos	Team	Pld	W	D	L	GF	GA	GD	Pts
26	(Portugal) Porto	4	1	0	3	6	7	−1	3
27	(Italy) Napoli	4	1	0	3	6	11	−5	3
28	(Spain) Villarreal	4	1	0	3	8	14	−6	3
29	(Greece) AEK Athens	4	1	0	3	5	11	−6	3
29	(Germany) RB Leipzig	4	1	0	3	5	11	−6	3

Updated to match(es) played on 4 November 2026. Source: UEFA
Rules for classification: League phase tiebreakers

Round	1	2	3	4	5	6	7	8
Ground	A	H	A	H	A	H	A	H
Result	L	W	L	L				
Position	21	14						
Points	0	3	3	3				

Updated to match(es) played on 3 November 2026. Source: UEFA
A = Away; H = Home; W = Win; D = Draw; L = Loss

8 September 2026 1	Borussia Dortmund (Germany)	3–2	(Spain) Villarreal	Dortmund, Germany
21:00 CEST (UTC+2)	Anton (yellow card) 38'; Veiga 53' (o.g.); Guirassy 80', 85' (pen.)	Report	Navarro (yellow card) 38'; Cardona (yellow card) 42'; Mouriño 66', (yellow card) 84'; Guirassy 90+3' (o.g.)	Stadium: Westfalenstadion; Attendance: 77,500; Referee: Simone Sozza (Italy)

13 October 2026	Villarreal (Spain)	3–1	(Italy) Napoli	Estadio de la Cerámica, Villarreal
21:00	Mikautadze 23', (yellow card) 33'; Mouriño 26'; Saliba (yellow card) 67'; Oluwaseyi 86'	Report	Rrahmani 8'; Giovane (yellow card) 55'; De Bruyne (yellow card) 62'; Di Lorenzo (yellow card) 85'	Referee: Daniel Siebert (Germany)

20 October 2026	Liverpool (England)	4–3	(Spain) Villarreal	Anfield, Liverpool
21:00 (20:00 UTC+1)	Mac Allister 36', 65'; Araújo 45+2'; Wirtz 68'	Report	Mikautadze 4'; Moleiro (yellow card) 27'; Cardona 29'; Mouriño (yellow card) 41'; Oluwaseyi 87'	Attendance: 59,610; Referee: Szymon Marciniak (Poland)

3 November 2026	Villarreal (Spain)	0–6	(France) Paris Saint-Germain	Estadio de la Cerámica, Villarreal
21:00	Comesaña (yellow card) 45'; Mouriño (yellow card) 50'; Cardona (yellow card) 66'; Moleiro (yellow card) 78'	Report	Neves 9'; Doué 12'; Mayulu 13'; Fabián 17', 50'; Ndjantou (yellow card) 74'; Boly 78'	Attendance: 20,036; Referee: Felix Zwayer (Germany)

25 November 2026	Slavia Prague (Czech Republic)	v	(Spain) Villarreal	Fortuna Arena, Prague
18:45		Report

8 December 2026	Villarreal (Spain)	v	(Azerbaijan) Sabah	Estadio de la Cerámica, Villarreal
18:45		Report

20 January 2027	Fenerbahçe (Turkey)	v	(Spain) Villarreal	Şükrü Saracoğlu Stadium, Istanbul
18:45 (20:45 UTC+3)		Report

27 January 2027	Villarreal (Spain)	v	(England) Manchester United	Estadio de la Cerámica, Villarreal
21:00		Report

== Statistics ==
=== Squad statistics ===
No.	Pos	Nat	Player	Total		La Liga		Copa del Rey		UEFA Champions League	
No.	Pos	Nat	Player	Apps	Goals	Apps	Goals	Apps	Goals	Apps	Goals
Goalkeepers
1	GK	(Brazil) BRA	Luiz Júnior	2	0	2	0	0	0	0	0
13	GK	(Spain) ESP	Diego Conde	0	0	0	0	0	0	0	0
31	GK	(Spain) ESP	Arnau Tenas	0	0	0	0	0	0	0	0
Defenders
2	DF	(Cape Verde) CPV	Logan Costa	0	0	0	0	0	0	0	0
3	DF	(United States) USA	Alex Freeman	1	0	1	0	0	0	0	0
5	DF	(Democratic Republic of the Congo) COD	Willy Kambwala	0	0	0	0	0	0	0	0
6	DF	(Spain) ESP	Pau Navarro	0	0	0	0	0	0	0	0
8	DF	(Argentina) ARG	Juan Foyth	2	0	2	0	0	0	0	0
12	DF	(Portugal) POR	Renato Veiga	2	0	2	0	0	0	0	0
15	DF	(Uruguay) URU	Santiago Mouriño	2	0	2	0	0	0	0	0
20	MF	(Spain) ESP	Carlos Romero	2	0	2	0	0	0	0	0
23	DF	(Spain) ESP	Sergi Cardona	0	0	0	0	0	0	0	0
Midfielders
10	MF	(Spain) ESP	Alberto Moleiro	2	0	2	0	0	0	0	0
11	MF	(Morocco) MAR	Ilias Akhomach	2	0	2	0	0	0	0	0
14	MF	(Spain) ESP	Santi Comesaña	2	0	2	0	0	0	0	0
17	MF	(Canada) CAN	Tajon Buchanan	2	0	2	0	0	0	0	0
18	MF	(Senegal) SEN	Pape Gueye	2	1	2	1	0	0	0	0
26	MF	(Spain) ESP	Carlos Maciá	2	0	2	0	0	0	0	0
Forwards
7	FW	(Spain) ESP	Gerard Moreno	2	1	2	1	0	0	0	0
9	FW	(Georgia (country)) GEO	Georges Mikautadze	2	1	2	1	0	0	0	0
19	FW	(Ivory Coast) CIV	Nicolas Pépé	2	1	2	1	0	0	0	0
21	FW	(Canada) CAN	Tani Oluwaseyi	1	0	1	0	0	0	0	0
22	FW	(Spain) ESP	Ayoze Pérez	2	0	2	0	0	0	0	0
Players transferred out during the season

Last updated: 23 August 2026
Source: Competitions
