= Adrián Suárez =

Spanish footballer

Adri Suárez
Personal information
- Full name: Adrián Suárez Ortega
- Date of birth: 28 May 2005 (age 21)
- Place of birth: Teror, Spain
- Height: 1.90 m (6 ft 3 in)
- Position: Goalkeeper

Team information
- Current team: Las Palmas
- Number: 35

Youth career
- 2009–2014: Teror
- 2014–2020: Las Palmas
- 2020–2021: Villarreal
- 2021–2022: Roda
- 2022–2023: Villarreal

Senior career*
Years	Team	Apps	(Gls)
2023–2025	Villarreal C	16	(0)
2025–	Las Palmas	0	(0)
- * Club domestic league appearances and goals as of 11 May 2024

Adrián "Adri" Suárez Ortega (born 28 May 2005) is a Spanish professional footballer who plays as a goalkeeper for UD Las Palmas.

== Club career ==
=== Early career ===
Born in Teror, Las Palmas, Canary Islands, Suárez began his career with hometown side UD Teror Balompié at the age of four. He joined UD Las Palmas at the age of nine, before moving to Villarreal CF's youth sides in July 2020.

=== Villarreal ===
In July 2023, after being a first-choice in the Juvenil A squad, Suárez was promoted to Villarreal's C-team in Tercera Federación. He made his senior debut on 1 October, starting in a 1–1 away draw against CD Burriana.

Suárez shared the starting spot with Kike Bartual during the season, but spent the entire 2024–25 campaign as a third-choice after not signing a new contract, and left in May 2025.

=== Las Palmas ===
On 18 June 2025, Suárez agreed to a four-year deal with UD Las Palmas in Segunda División.

== International career ==
On 30 September 2021, Suárez was called up to the Spain national under-17 team for two friendlies against the Netherlands. He remained an unused substitute in both matches.
