= 2025–26 Villarreal CF season =

126th season of Villarreal CF

Villarreal
2025–26 season
- President: Fernando Roig
- Head coach: Marcelino
- Stadium: Estadio de la Cerámica
- La Liga: 3rd
- Copa del Rey: Round of 32
- UEFA Champions League: League phase
- Top goalscorer: League: Georges Mikautadze (13); All: Georges Mikautadze (15)
- Biggest win: Home: Villarreal 5–0 Girona; Away: Ciudad Lucena 0–6 Villarreal
- Biggest defeat: Home: Villarreal 0–2 Manchester City; Villarreal 0–2 Barcelona; Villarreal 0–2 Real Madrid; Away: Borussia Dortmund 4–0 Villarreal
Home colours	Away colours	Third colours

The 2025–26 season was the 103rd season in the history of Villarreal Club de Fútbol, and the club's 13th consecutive season in La Liga. In addition to the domestic league, Villarreal participated in this season's editions of the Copa del Rey and the UEFA Champions League. The season covers the period from 1 July 2025 to 30 June 2026.

== Players ==
=== First-team squad ===
As of 29 January 2026

Note: Flags indicate national team as defined under FIFA eligibility rules; some limited exceptions apply. Players may hold more than one non-FIFA nationality.

No.	Pos.	Nation	Player
1	GK	BRA	Luiz Júnior
2	DF	CPV	Logan Costa
3	DF	USA	Alex Freeman
4	DF	ESP	Rafa Marín (on loan from Napoli)
5	DF	COD	Willy Kambwala
7	FW	ESP	Gerard Moreno (vice-captain)
8	DF	ARG	Juan Foyth (3rd captain)
9	FW	GEO	Georges Mikautadze
10	MF	ESP	Dani Parejo (captain)
11	FW	ESP	Alfon González (on loan from Sevilla)
12	DF	POR	Renato Veiga
13	GK	ESP	Diego Conde

No.	Pos.	Nation	Player
14	MF	ESP	Santi Comesaña
15	DF	URU	Santiago Mouriño
16	MF	GHA	Thomas Partey
17	MF	CAN	Tajon Buchanan
18	MF	SEN	Pape Gueye
19	FW	CIV	Nicolas Pépé
20	MF	ESP	Alberto Moleiro
21	FW	CAN	Tani Oluwaseyi
22	FW	ESP	Ayoze Pérez
23	DF	ESP	Sergi Cardona
24	DF	ESP	Alfonso Pedraza (4th captain)
25	GK	ESP	Arnau Tenas
26	DF	ESP	Pau Navarro

=== Reserve team ===
Note: Flags indicate national team as defined under FIFA eligibility rules; some limited exceptions apply. Players may hold more than one non-FIFA nationality.

No.	Pos.	Nation	Player
27	DF	CIV	Jean Ives Valou
28	FW	MLI	Mahamoud Barry
29	DF	ESP	Ismael Sierra (on loan from Estoril)
30	DF	ESP	Daniel Budesca

No.	Pos.	Nation	Player
31	GK	ESP	Rubén Gómez
32	MF	ESP	Hugo López
33	FW	ESP	Pau Cabanes
36	FW	ESP	Víctor Moreno

=== Out on loan ===
Note: Flags indicate national team as defined under FIFA eligibility rules; some limited exceptions apply. Players may hold more than one non-FIFA nationality.

No.	Pos.	Nation	Player
—	DF	ESP	Carlos Romero (at Espanyol until 30 June 2026)
—	MF	ESP	Dani Requena (at Córdoba until 30 June 2026)
—	MF	ESP	Ramon Terrats (at Espanyol until 30 June 2026)
—	MF	ARG	Thiago Ojeda (at Cultural Leonesa until 30 June 2026)

No.	Pos.	Nation	Player
—	FW	ESP	Álex Forés (at Oviedo until 30 June 2026)
—	FW	ESP	Toni Tamarit (at Mirandés until 30 June 2026)
—	FW	MAR	Ilias Akhomach (at Rayo Vallecano until 30 June 2026)
—	MF	ARG	Thiago Fernández (at Oviedo until 30 June 2026)

== Transfers ==
=== In ===
Pos.	Player	Transferred from	Fee	Date
MF	(Spain) Alberto Moleiro	(Spain) Las Palmas	Undisclosed	17 June 2025
DF	(Spain) Rafa Marín	(Italy) Napoli	Loan	3 July 2025
FW	(Canada) Tajon Buchanan	(Italy) Inter Milan	Undisclosed	29 July 2025
DF	(Uruguay) Santiago Mouriño	(Spain) Atlético Madrid	Undisclosed	1 August 2025
MF	(Ghana) Thomas Partey	(England) Arsenal	Free	7 August 2025
DF	(Portugal) Renato Veiga	(England) Chelsea	Undisclosed	22 August 2025
GK	(Spain) Arnau Tenas	(France) Paris Saint-Germain	Free	28 August 2025
FW	(Canada) Tani Oluwaseyi	(United States) Minnesota United	Undisclosed	29 August 2025
FW	(Georgia (country)) Georges Mikautadze	(France) Lyon	Undisclosed	1 September 2025
MF	(Argentina) Thiago Fernández	(Argentina) Vélez Sarsfield	Free	2 January 2026
FW	(Spain) Alfon González	(Spain) Sevilla	Loan	27 January 2026
DF	(United States) Alex Freeman	(United States) Orlando City	Undisclosed	29 January 2026

== Pre-season and friendlies ==
19 July 2025 1	Basel	3–3	Villarreal	Altach, Austria
18:00 CEST (UTC+02:00)	Carlos 65'; Ajeti 27'; Shaqiri 12'	Report	Danjuma 87'; Perez 33'; Ajeti 24' (OG)	Stadium: Stadion Schnabelholz; Referee: Matthias Gächter

22 July 2025 2	St. Gallen	2–2	Villarreal	St. Gallen, Switzerland
19:00 CEST (UTC+02:00)	Vandermersch 83'; Geubbels 15'	Report	Comesaña 89'; Eyong 76'	Stadium: Kybunpark

25 July 2025 3	Sporting CP	1–0	Villarreal	Oeiras, Portugal
20:30 CEST (UTC+02:00)	Hjulmand 8' (pen.)	Report		Stadium: Estádio Nacional

31 July 2025 4	Villarreal	1–3; 45-minute match	Genoa	Oviedo, Spain
19:00 CEST (UTC+02:00)	Kambwala 15'	Report	Grønbæk 40' (pen.); Vitinha 26' (pen.); Norton-Cuffy 7'	Stadium: Estadio Carlos Tartiere
Note: Villarreal-Genoa-Oviedo triangular series

31 July 2025 5	Oviedo	0–0; 45-minute match	Villarreal	Oviedo, Spain
21:00 CEST (UTC+02:00)		Report		Stadium: Estadio Carlos Tartiere
Note: Villarreal-Genoa-Oviedo triangular series

2 August 2025 6	Leeds United	1–1	Villarreal	Leeds, West Yorkshire, England
16:00 CEST (UTC+02:00)	Piroe 67'	Report	Eyong 62'	Stadium: Elland Road; Attendance: 35,273

6 August 2025 7	Arsenal	2–3	Villarreal	London, England
19:00 CEST (UTC+02:00)	Ødegaard 76'; Nørgaard 36'	Report	Danjuma 68'; Eyong 33'; Pepe 16'	Stadium: Emirates Stadium; Attendance: 60,355

10 August 2025 8	Villarreal	0–2	Aston Villa	Villarreal, Spain
21:00 CEST (UTC+02:00)		Report	Buendía 49'; Watkins 24'	Stadium: Estadio de la Cerámica
Note: Match held for the Trofeo de la Cerámica

== Competitions ==
=== Overall record ===
Competition	First match	Last match	Starting round	Final position	Record							
Competition	First match	Last match	Starting round	Final position	Pld	W	D	L	GF	GA	GD	Win %
La Liga	15 August 2025	24 May 2026	Matchday 1	3rd	38	22	6	10	72	46	+26	57.89
Copa del Rey	29 October 2025	17 December 2025	First round	Round of 32	3	1	1	1	8	3	+5	33.33
UEFA Champions League	16 September 2025	28 January 2026	League phase	League phase	8	0	1	7	5	18	−13	0.00
Total					49	23	8	18	85	67	+18	46.94

Source: Soccerway

=== La Liga ===
==== League Table ====
Pos	Team	Pld	W	D	L	GF	GA	GD	Pts	Qualification or relegation
1	Barcelona (C)	38	31	1	6	95	36	+59	94	Qualification for the Champions League league phase (Note: La Liga gained an additional Champions League place as a result of Spain gaining one of the two European Performance Spots (EPS) awarded to the two associations with the highest UEFA coefficient points in 2025–26.)
2	Real Madrid	38	27	5	6	77	35	+42	86	Qualification for the Champions League league phase
3	Villarreal	38	22	6	10	72	46	+26	72	Qualification for the Champions League league phase
4	Atlético Madrid	38	21	6	11	62	44	+18	69	Qualification for the Champions League league phase
5	Real Betis	38	15	15	8	59	48	+11	60	Qualification for the Champions League league phase

Source: LaLiga EA Sports
Rules for classification: 1) Points; 2) Head-to-head points; 3) Head-to-head goal difference; 4) Goal difference; 5) Goals scored; 6) Fair-play points
(Note: Head-to-head record is used only after all the matches between the teams in question have been played)
(C) Champions

==== Results Summary ====
Overall								Home						Away					
Pld	W	D	L	GF	GA	GD	Pts	W	D	L	GF	GA	GD	W	D	L	GF	GA	GD
38	22	6	10	72	46	+26	72	15	1	3	48	19	+29	7	5	7	24	27	−3

Source: La Liga

==== Results by round ====
Round	1	2	3	4	5	6	7	8	9	10	11	12	13	14	15	17	18	19	20	21	22	23	24	16	25	26	27	28	29	30	31	32	33	34	35	36	37	38
Ground	H	H	A	A	H	A	H	A	H	A	H	A	H	A	H	H	A	H	A	H	A	H	A	A	H	A	H	A	H	A	A	H	A	H	A	H	A	H
Result	W	W	D	L	W	W	W	L	D	W	W	W	W	W	W	L	W	W	L	L	D	W	L	W	W	L	W	D	W	L	W	W	D	W	D	L	L	W
Position	3	1	3	6	3	3	3	3	3	3	3	3	3	3	3	3	3	3	3	3	4	3	3	3	4	4	4	3	3	3	3	3	3	3	3	3	3	3

Source: Soccerway
A = Away; H = Home; W = Win; D = Draw; L = Loss

==== Matches ====
The league fixtures were announced on 1 July 2025.

15 August 2025 1	Villarreal	2–0	Oviedo	Villarreal
19:30 (UTC+02:00)	Gueye 36'; Eyong 29'; Luiz Júnior (yellow card) 13'	Report	Campos (yellow card) 18' (yellow-red card) 27'	Stadium: Estadio de la Cerámica; Attendance: 18,333; Referee: Alejandro Muñiz Ruiz

24 August 2025 2	Villarreal	5–0	Girona	Villarreal
17:30 (UTC+02:00	Mouriño (yellow card) 56'; Marín 25'; Buchanan 16', 28', 64'; Pepe 7'	Report	Krejci (yellow card) 59'; Vitor Reis (yellow card) 53'	Stadium: Estadio de la Cerámica; Attendance: 18,195; Referee: Guillermo Cuadra Fernández

31 August 2025 3	Celta Vigo	1–1	Villarreal	Vigo
17:00 (UTC+02:00)	Iglesias 90+4' (pen.); Román (yellow card) 67'	Report	Gueye (yellow card) 70'; Pépé 53'	Stadium: Estadio Balaidos; Attendance: 20,172; Referee: Alejandro Quintero González

13 September 2025 4	Atlético Madrid	2–0	Villarreal	Madrid
19:00 (UTC+02:00)	Ruggeri (yellow card) 73'; González 52'; Alvarez (yellow card) 32'; Barrios 9'	Report	Pedraza (yellow card) 90+4'; Mouriño (yellow card) 83'; Veiga (yellow card) 65'; Parejo (yellow card) 24'	Stadium: Metropolitano Stadium; Attendance: 63,312; Referee: José Luis Munuera Montero

20 September 2025 5	Villarreal	2–1	Osasuna	Villarreal
16:30 (UTC+02:00)	Comesaña (yellow card) 87'; Gueye 84'; Mikautadze 69'; Navarro (yellow card) 41'	Report	Budimir 45+6'; Torro (yellow card) 39'; Rosier 33' (yellow card) 39' (yellow-red card)	Stadium: Estadio de la Cerámica; Attendance: 17,542; Referee: Isidro Díaz de Mera

23 September 2025 6	Sevilla	1–2	Villarreal	Seville
19:30 (UTC+02:00)	Oso (yellow card) 90+3'; Gudelj (yellow card) 70'; Sow 51'	Report	Solomon 85'; Marín (yellow card) 85'; Pedraza (yellow card) 47'; Gueye (yellow card) 42'; Oluwaseyi 17'	Stadium: Ramón Sánchez-Pizjuán Stadium; Attendance: 38,145; Referee: César Soto Grado

27 September 2025 7	Villarreal	1–0	Athletic Bilbao	Villarreal
21:00 (UTC+02:00)	Parejo (yellow card) 90+2'; Buchanan (yellow card) 83'; Moleiro 77'	Report		Stadium: Estadio de la Cerámica; Attendance: 18,908; Referee: Miguel Sesma Espinosa

4 October 2025 8	Real Madrid	3–1	Villarreal	Madrid
21:00 (UTC+02:00)	Tchouaméni (yellow card) 33'; Mastantuono (yellow card) 45+1'; Vinícius 47', 69'; Mbappé 69' (pen.)	Report	Cardona (yellow card) 12'; Mouriño (yellow card) 21' (yellow-red card) 77'; Gueye (yellow card) 69'; Mikautadze 73'	Stadium: Bernabéu; Attendance: 75,216; Referee: Guillermo Cuadra Fernández

18 October 2025 9	Villarreal	2–2	Real Betis	Villarreal
16:30 (UTC+02:00)	Moleiro 64'; Buchanan 44', (yellow card) 90'	Report	Amrabat (yellow card) 90'; Antony 65', 90+4'	Stadium: Estadio de la Cerámica; Attendance: 19,238; Referee: Francisco José Hernández Maeso

25 October 2025 10	Valencia	0–2	Villarreal	Valencia
19:00 (UTC+02:00)	Tarrega (yellow card) 90'; Copete (yellow card) 42'	Report	Pépé (yellow card) 83'; Comesaña 57', (yellow card) 69'; Gerard 45'; Gueye (yellow card) 15'; Mouriño (yellow card) 15'	Stadium: Mestalla; Attendance: 45,560; Referee: Javier Alberola Rojas

1 November 2025 11	Villarreal	4–0	Rayo Vallecano	Villarreal
13:00 (UTC+01:00)	Perez 65'; Comesaña 58'; Moleiro (yellow card) 28', (goal) 56'; Gerard 22'	Report	Rațiu (yellow card) 53'	Stadium: Estadio de la Cerámica; Attendance: 17,022; Referee: Iosu Galech Apezteguía

9 November 2025 12	Espanyol	0–2	Villarreal	Barcelona
20:00 (UTC+01:00)		Report	Navarro (yellow card) 81'; Buchanan (yellow card) 61'; Moleiro 57'; Gerard 43'	Stadium: RCDE Stadium; Attendance: 29,540; Referee: Alejandro José Hernández

23 November 2025 13	Villarreal	2–1	Mallorca	Villarreal
20:00 (UTC+01:00)	Buchanan (yellow card) 90+4'; Luiz Júnior (yellow card) 89'; Oluwaseyi 82'; Gerard 6'	Report	Mojica (yellow card) 74'; Bergstrom (yellow card) 67'; Costa 8'	Stadium: Estadio de la Cerámica; Attendance: 16,854; Referee: José Luis Guzmán Mansilla

30 November 2025 14	Real Sociedad	2–3	Villarreal	San Sebastián
14:00 (UTC+01:00)	Barrenetxea (yellow card) 70', (goal) 87'; Martin (yellow card) 69'; Soler 60'; Sadiq (yellow card) 42'	Report	Foyth (yellow card) 90'; Luiz Júnior (yellow card) 73'; Mouriño (yellow card) 73'; Pedraza (yellow card) 67'; Moleiro (yellow card) 48', (goal) 57'; Pérez 31', (yellow card) 45+2'; Gueye (yellow card) 20'	Stadium: Reale Arena; Attendance: 30,140; Referee: César Soto Grado

6 December 2025 15	Villarreal	2–0	Getafe	Villarreal
14:00 (UTC+01:00)	Buchanan 45+5'; Maciá (yellow card) 62'; Mikautadze 64'; Pépé (yellow card) 71'	Report	Nyom (yellow card) 22'; Martín (yellow card) 45+3'; Milla (red card); Arambarri (yellow card) 57'; Rico (yellow card) 90+1'	Stadium: Estadio de la Cerámica

21 December 2025 17	Villarreal	0–2	Barcelona	Villarreal
16:15 (UTC+01:00)	Veiga (red card) 39'; Buchanan (yellow card) 73'	Report	Raphinha 12' (pen.); E. García (yellow card) 58'; Yamal 63'	Stadium: Estadio de la Cerámica; Attendance: 20,701; Referee: Javier Alberola Rojas

4 January 2026 18	Elche	1–3	Villarreal	Elche
18:30 (UTC+01:00)	Neto 30'; Valera (yellow card) 50'; Bigas (yellow card) 66'; Febas (yellow card) 66'	Report	Moleiro 7'; Mikautadze 13'; Pérez (yellow card) 39'; Pedraza 83'; Comesaña (yellow card) 66'; Cardona (yellow card) 88'	Stadium: Estadio Martínez Valero; Attendance: 27,078; Referee: Isidro Díaz de Mera

11 January 2026 19	Villarreal	3–1	Alavés	Villarreal
16:15 (UTC+01:00)	Moleiro 49'; Gerard 55'; Mikautadze 75'	Report	Aleñá (yellow card) 10'; Jonny (yellow card) 45'; Martínez 85'	Stadium: Estadio de la Cerámica; Attendance: 17,011; Referee: Alejandro Muñiz Ruiz

18 January 2026 20	Real Betis	2–0	Villarreal	Seville
21:00 (UTC+01:00)	Ruibal 57'; Fornals 83'	Report		Stadium: Estadio Benito Villamarín; Attendance: 60,138; Referee: Víctor García Verdura

25 January 2026 21	Villarreal	0–2	Real Madrid	Villarreal
21:00 (UTC+01:00)	Foyth (yellow card) 2'; Buchanan (yellow card) 52'; Navarro (yellow card) 57'	Report	Mbappé 47', 90+4' (pen.); Mastantuono (yellow card) 62'	Stadium: Estadio de la Cerámica; Attendance: 20,432; Referee: César Soto Grado

31 January 2026 22	Osasuna	2–2	Villarreal	Pamplona
16:15 (UTC+01:00)	Muñoz 20'; Catena (yellow card) 38'; Budimir 45+2'; Torró (yellow card) 72'; Lisci (yellow card) 75'	Report	Gerard 17', 70'; Pedraza (yellow card) 19'; Veiga (yellow card) 90+1'	Stadium: El Sadar Stadium; Attendance: 20.455; Referee: Ricardo De Burgos Bengoechea

10 February 2026 23	Villarreal	4–1	Espanyol	Villarreal
21:00 (UTC+01:00)	Mikautadze 35'; Salinas 41' (OG); Pépé 50'; Moleiro 55'	Report	Cabrera 88'	Stadium: Estadio de la Cerámica; Attendance: 16,825; Referee: Adrián Cordero Vega

14 February 2026 24	Getafe	2–1	Villarreal	Getafe
15:15 (UTC+01:00)	Satriano 53'; Arambarri 41'	Report	Mikautadze 76'	Stadium: Estadio Coliseum; Attendance: 7,551; Referee: Miguel Sesma Espinosa

18 February 2026 16	Levante	0–1	Villarreal	Valencia
20:00 (UTC+01:00)		Report	Mikautadze 57'	Attendance: 18,153; Referee: Juan Martínez Munuera

22 February 2026 25	Villarreal	2–1	Valencia	Villarreal
21:00 (UTC+01:00)	Gueye 51' (pen.); Comesaña 31'	Report	Ramazani 27' (pen.)	Stadium: Estadio de la Cerámica; Attendance: 19,233; Referee: Jesús Gil Manzano

1 March 2026 26	Barcelona	4–1	Villarreal	Barcelona
TBA				Stadium: Camp Nou

8 March 2026 27	Villarreal	2–1	Elche	Villarreal
TBA				Stadium: Estadio de la Cerámica

15 March 2026 28	Alavés	1–1	Villarreal	Vitoria-Gasteiz
TBA				Stadium: Mendizorrotza Stadium

22 March 2026 29	Villarreal	3–1	Real Sociedad	Villarreal
TBA				Stadium: Estadio de la Cerámica

5 April 2026 30	Girona	1–0	Villarreal	Girona
TBA				Stadium: Estadi Montilivi

12 April 2026 31	Athletic Bilbao	1–2	Villarreal	Bilbao
TBA				Stadium: San Mames

22 April 2026 33	Oviedo	1–1	Villarreal	Oviedo
TBA				Stadium: Estadio Carlos Tartiere

19 April 2026 32	Villarreal	2–1	Celta Vigo	Villarreal
TBA				Stadium: Estadio de la Cerámica

3 May 2026 34	Villarreal	5–1	Levante	Villarreal
TBA				Stadium: Estadio de la Cerámica

10 May 2026 35	Mallorca	1–1	Villarreal	Palma
TBA				Stadium: Estadi Mallorca Son Moix

13 May 2026 36	Villarreal	2–3	Sevilla	Villarreal
TBA				Stadium: Estadio de la Cerámica

17 May 2026 37	Rayo Vallecano	2–0	Villarreal	Madrid
TBA				Stadium: Vallecas Stadium

24 May 2026 38	Villarreal	5–1	Atlético Madrid	Villarreal
TBA				Stadium: Estadio de la Cerámica

=== Copa del Rey ===
Villarreal entered the competition at the first round.

29 October 2025 First round	CD Lucena	0–6	Villarreal	Lucena
19:30 CET (UTC+01:00)		Report	Comesaña 84'; Mikautadze 81'; Akhomach 60'; Oluwaseyi 15', 17', 71'	Stadium: Estadio Ciudad de Lucena; Attendance: 6,000; Referee: Jesús Gil Manzano

3 December 2025 Second round	Atlético Antoniano	1–1 (a.e.t.) (3–5 p)	Villarreal	Lebrija
21:00 (UTC+01:00)	García 109'	Report	Pérez 102'	Stadium: Estadio Municipal de Lebrija; Attendance: 3,500; Referee: Francisco José Hernández Maeso

17 December 2025 Round of 32	Racing Santander	2–1	Villarreal	Santander
19:00 (UTC+01:00)	Arana 6', 28'	Report	Pérez 86'	Stadium: El Sardinero; Attendance: 20,768; Referee: Isidro Díaz De Mera Escuderos

=== UEFA Champions League ===
==== League phase ====
The league phase draw was held on 28 August 2025.

Pos	Team	Pld	W	D	L	GF	GA	GD	Pts
32	(Royal Dutch Football Association) Ajax	8	2	0	6	8	21	−13	6
33	(German Football Association) Eintracht Frankfurt	8	1	1	6	10	21	−11	4
34	(Football Association of the Czech Republic) Slavia Prague	8	0	3	5	5	19	−14	3
35	(Royal Spanish Football Federation) Villarreal	8	0	1	7	5	18	−13	1
36	(Kazakhstan Football Federation) Kairat	8	0	1	7	7	22	−15	1

Source: UEFA
Rules for classification: League phase tiebreakers

Overall								Home						Away					
Pld	W	D	L	GF	GA	GD	Pts	W	D	L	GF	GA	GD	W	D	L	GF	GA	GD
8	0	1	7	5	18	−13	1	0	1	3	5	9	−4	0	0	4	0	9	−9

Source: UEFA

Round	1	2	3	4	5	6	7	8
Ground	A	H	H	A	A	H	H	A
Result	L	D	L	L	L	L	L	L
Position	27	26	31	32	34	35	35	35

Source: UEFA
A = Away; H = Home; W = Win; D = Draw; L = Loss

16 September 2025 1	Tottenham Hotspur (England)	1–0	(Spain) Villarreal	London, England
20:00 BST (UTC+1)	Luiz Júnior 4' (o.g.); Simons (yellow card) 30'; Richarlison (yellow card) 33'; Kolo Muani (yellow card) 78'; Van de Ven (yellow card) 84'	Report	Comesaña (yellow card) 35'; Mouriño (yellow card) 36'; Veiga (yellow card) 53'	Stadium: Tottenham Hotspur Stadium; Attendance: 54,755; Referee: Rade Obrenović (Slovenia)

1 October 2025 2	Villarreal (Spain)	2–2	(Italy) Juventus	Villarreal, Spain
21:00 CEST (UTC+2)	Mikautadze 18'; Akhomach (yellow card) 85'; Veiga 90'	Report	Cabal (yellow card) 6'; Gatti 49'; Conceição 56', (yellow card) 90+5'; Cambiaso (yellow card) 77'	Stadium: Estadio de la Cerámica; Attendance: 20,087; Referee: István Kovács (Romania)

21 October 2025 3	Villarreal (Spain)	0–2	(England) Manchester City	Villarreal, Spain
21:00 CEST (UTC+2)	Pedraza (yellow card) 11'; Mouriño (yellow card) 45'; Gueye (yellow card) 75'; Moleiro (yellow card) 85'	Report	Haaland 17'; Silva (yellow card) 22', (goal) 40'; Dias (yellow card) 65'	Stadium: Estadio de la Cerámica; Attendance: 20,539; Referee: Serdar Gözübüyük (Netherlands)

5 November 2025 4	Pafos (Cyprus)	1–0	(Spain) Villarreal	Limassol, Cyprus
19:45 EET (UTC+2)	Luckassen 46', (yellow card) 69'	Report	Veiga (yellow card) 76'; Gueye (yellow card) 90'	Stadium: Alphamega Stadium; Attendance: 6,314; Referee: Sven Jablonski (Germany)
Note: The match was played at Alphamega Stadium in Limassol, instead of Pafos' regular stadium, Stelios Kyriakides Stadium in Paphos, which did not meet UEFA requirements.

25 November 2025 5	Borussia Dortmund (Germany)	4–0	(Spain) Villarreal	Dortmund, Germany
21:00 CET (UTC+1)	Guirassy 45+2', 54', (penalty missed) 54'; Adeyemi 58', (yellow card) 71'; Silva (penalty missed) 82'; Svensson 90+5'	Report	Foyth (red card) 50'	Stadium: Westfalenstadion; Attendance: 81,365; Referee: Davide Massa (Italy)

10 December 2025 6	Villarreal (Spain)	2–3	(Denmark) Copenhagen	Villarreal, Spain
18:45 CET (UTC+1)	Pedraza (yellow card) 34'; Comesaña 47'; Oluwaseyi 56'; Akhomach (yellow card) 58'; Gueye (yellow card) 89'	Report	Elyounoussi 2'; Achouri 48', (yellow card) 83'; Cornelius (yellow card) 77', (goal) 90'	Stadium: Estadio de la Cerámica; Attendance: 17,023; Referee: Ivan Kružliak (Slovakia)

20 January 2026 7	Villarreal (Spain)	1–2	(Netherlands) Ajax	Villarreal, Spain
21:00 CET (UTC+1)	Oluwaseyi 49'; Mouriño (yellow card) 60'; Partey (yellow card) 71'; Marín (yellow card) 80'	Report	Wijndal (yellow card) 12'; Gloukh 61'; Bouwman (yellow card) 88'; Edvardsen 90'	Stadium: Estadio de la Cerámica; Attendance: 14,023; Referee: Nick Walsh (Scotland)

28 January 2026 8	Bayer Leverkusen (Germany)	3–0	(Spain) Villarreal	Leverkusen, Germany
21:00 CET (UTC+1)	Tillman 12', 35'; Grimaldo 57'	Report	Navarro (yellow card) 45+1'; Marín (yellow card) 52'; Pépé (yellow card) 56'	Stadium: BayArena; Attendance: 30,210; Referee: Espen Eskås (Norway)

== Statistics ==
=== Squad statistics ===
No.	Pos	Nat	Player	Total		La Liga		Copa del Rey		UEFA Champions League	
No.	Pos	Nat	Player	Apps	Goals	Apps	Goals	Apps	Goals	Apps	Goals
Goalkeepers
1	GK	(Brazil) BRA	Luiz Júnior	33	0	28	0	0	0	5	0
13	GK	(Spain) ESP	Diego Conde	1	0	0	0	1	0	0	0
31	GK	(Spain) ESP	Arnau Tenas	15	0	10	0	2	0	3	0
Defenders
2	DF	(Cape Verde) CPV	Logan Costa	2	0	2	0	0	0	0	0
3	DF	(United States) USA	Alex Freeman	9	0	9	0	0	0	0	0
4	DF	(Spain) ESP	Rafa Marín	31	1	23	1	3	0	5	0
5	DF	(Democratic Republic of the Congo) COD	Willy Kambwala	2	0	2	0	0	0	0	0
6	DF	(Spain) ESP	Pau Navarro	27	0	23	0	1	0	3	0
8	DF	(Argentina) ARG	Juan Foyth	18	0	13	0	1	0	4	0
12	DF	(Portugal) POR	Renato Veiga	42	1	32	0	2	0	8	1
15	DF	(Uruguay) URU	Santiago Mouriño	34	1	28	1	0	0	6	0
23	DF	(Spain) ESP	Sergi Cardona	42	1	31	1	3	0	8	0
24	DF	(Spain) ESP	Alfonso Pedraza	35	1	27	1	3	0	5	0
33	DF	(Spain) ESP	Dani Budesca	1	0	0	0	0	0	1	0
Midfielders
10	MF	(Spain) ESP	Dani Parejo	41	1	32	1	2	0	7	0
14	MF	(Spain) ESP	Santi Comesaña	44	5	34	3	2	1	8	1
16	MF	(Ghana) GHA	Thomas Partey	32	0	25	0	2	0	5	0
17	MF	(Canada) CAN	Tajon Buchanan	43	7	34	7	2	0	7	0
18	MF	(Senegal) SEN	Pape Gueye	39	5	30	5	2	0	7	0
20	MF	(Spain) ESP	Alberto Moleiro	45	10	37	10	1	0	7	0
37	MF	(Spain) ESP	Carlos Maciá	6	0	5	0	1	0	0	0
38	MF	(Senegal) SEN	Alassane Diatta	2	0	1	0	0	0	1	0
Forwards
7	FW	(Spain) ESP	Gerard Moreno	24	10	22	10	0	0	2	0
9	FW	(Georgia (country)) GEO	Georges Mikautadze	42	15	32	13	3	1	7	1
11	FW	(Spain) ESP	Alfon González	10	1	10	1	0	0	0	0
19	FW	(Ivory Coast) CIV	Nicolas Pépé	46	8	36	8	2	0	8	0
21	FW	(Canada) CAN	Tani Oluwaseyi	37	7	27	2	3	3	7	2
22	FW	(Spain) ESP	Ayoze Pérez	33	7	25	5	3	2	5	0
32	FW	(Spain) ESP	Hugo López	5	0	2	0	2	0	1	0
33	FW	(Spain) ESP	Pau Cabanes	1	0	1	0	0	0	0	0
Players transferred during the season
3	DF	(Spain) ESP	Adrià Altimira	4	0	1	0	3	0	0	0
6	FW	(Israel) ISR	Manor Solomon	11	1	6	1	3	0	2	0
11	FW	(Morocco) MAR	Ilias Akhomach	15	1	9	0	2	1	4	0
21	FW	(Spain) ESP	Yéremy Pino	2	0	2	0	0	0	0	0
29	FW	(Cameroon) CMR	Karl Etta Eyong	3	1	3	1	0	0	0	0

Last updated: 30 June 2026
Source: Competitions
