= Caden McLoughlin =

Irish footballer (born 2005)

Personal information
- Full name: Caden Lemor McLoughlin
- Date of birth: 6 March 2005 (age 21)
- Place of birth: Kingston upon Thames, England
- Height: 1.81 m (5 ft 11 in)
- Position: Forward

Team information
- Current team: San Pedro

Youth career
- 2012–2016: Esteponense
- 2016–2020: Málaga
- 2019–2020: → San Félix Cadete
- 2020–2024: Villarreal
- 2022–2023: → Roda

Senior career*
| Years | Team | Apps | (Gls) |
| 2024–2025 | Villarreal C | 6 | (0) |
| 2025–2026 | San Pedro | 23 | (1) |
| 2026– | Club Lemos | 7 | (4) |

International career^{‡}
| 2019–2020 | Republic of Ireland U15 | 9 | (5) |
| 2021–2022 | Republic of Ireland U17 | 8 | (0) |
| 2023 | Republic of Ireland U19 | 2 | (0) |
- * Club domestic league appearances and goals as of 09:40, 22 October 2026 ‡ National team caps and goals as of 09:44, 22 July 2025 (UTC)

Caden Lemor McLoughlin (born 6 March 2005) is a professional footballer who plays as a forward for Tercera Federación club San Pedro. Born in England and raised in Spain, he has represented the Republic of Ireland at youth international level.

== Club career ==
Born in Kingston upon Thames, England and raised in Costa del Sol, Málaga, Spain, to an Irish mother from Finglas, Dublin, McLouglin started his career with amateur side ADC Esteponense at the age of seven, before joining Málaga in 2016. While contracted to Málaga, he played for affiliate club San Félix Cadete. After five years with Los Albicelestes, he left the club by mutual consent in August 2020.

Following his departure from Málaga, he joined La Liga side Villarreal. He signed his first professional contract with Villarreal in April 2021. For the 2022–23 season, he was sent to affiliate club Roda.

In July 2025, he signed for Tercera Federación club UD San Pedro.

== International career ==
McLoughlin is eligible to represent England, the Republic of Ireland and Spain. He has represented the Republic of Ireland at U15 level, scoring a hattrick on his debut against Luxembourg, and U17 level. In October 2023, he was called up to the Republic of Ireland U19 squad for the first time.

== Personal life ==
McLouglin supports English side Chelsea, and lists former Chelsea player Didier Drogba, as well as Brazilian Neymar, as players he looks up to. He also holds Spanish citizenship. His full name in that document is Caden Lemor McLoughlin Henry. (Note: In this Spanish name, the first or paternal surname is McLoughlin and the second or maternal family name is Henry.)
