= Pau Navarro (footballer) =

Spanish footballer (born 2005)

Personal information
- Full name: Pau Navarro Badenes
- Date of birth: 25 April 2005 (age 21)
- Place of birth: La Vilavella, Spain
- Height: 1.84 m (6 ft 0 in)
- Position: Centre-back

Team information
- Current team: Villarreal
- Number: 6

Youth career
- –2019: Villarreal
- 2019–2020: Roda
- 2020–2023: Villarreal

Senior career*
Years	Team	Apps	(Gls)
2023–2024	Villarreal C	12	(2)
2023–2025	Villarreal B	17	(1)
2024–	Villarreal	40	(0)

International career^{‡}
2024	Spain U19	1	(0)
2025	Spain U20	5	(0)
- * Club domestic league appearances and goals as of 27 May 2026 ‡ National team caps and goals as of 21:50, 11 October 2025 (UTC)

Pau Navarro Badenes (born 25 April 2005) is a Spanish footballer who plays for La Liga club Villarreal CF. Mainly a centre-back, he can also play as a right-back or a defensive midfielder.

== Club career ==
Born in La Vilavella, Castellón, Valencian Community, Navarro was a Villarreal CF youth graduate. He made his senior debut with the C-team on 24 September 2023, starting in a 5–1 Tercera Federación home routing of CD Acero.

Navarro scored his first senior goal on 5 November 2023, netting the C's equalizer in a 1–1 home draw against CF Gandía. He made his professional debut with the reserves on 12 November, coming on as a half-time substitute for Álex Forés in a 1–0 Segunda División away win over CD Tenerife.

Navarro scored his first professional goal on 7 April 2024, netting the B's opener in a 2–1 home win over Burgos CF. He made his first team – and La Liga – debut on 26 September, replacing Logan Costa in a 2–1 away win over RCD Espanyol.

== International career ==
Navarro is a youth international for Spain. In September 2025, he was called up to the Spain U20 squad for the FIFA U-20 World Cup in Chile.

== Career statistics ==
As of match played 24 May 2026

Appearances and goals by club, season and competition
Club	Season	League			Copa del Rey		Europe		Other		Total	
Club	Season	Division	Apps	Goals	Apps	Goals	Apps	Goals	Apps	Goals	Apps	Goals
Villarreal C	2023–24	Tercera Federación	12	2	—		—		—		12	2
Villarreal B	2023–24	Segunda División	13	1	—		—		—		13	1
Villarreal B	2024–25	Primera Federación	4	0	—		—		—		4	0
Villarreal B	Total		17	1	—		—		—		17	1
Villarreal	2024–25	La Liga	17	0	2	0	—		—		19	0
Villarreal	2025–26	La Liga	23	0	1	0	3 (Note: Appearances in UEFA Champions League)	0	0	0	27	0
Villarreal	Total		40	0	3	0	3	0	0	0	46	0
Career total			69	3	3	0	3	0	0	0	75	3
