= Rubén Gómez (footballer, born 2002) =

Spanish footballer

Personal information
- Full name: Rubén Gómez Peris
- Date of birth: 24 January 2002 (age 24)
- Place of birth: Alzira, Spain
- Height: 1.85 m (6 ft 1 in)
- Position: Goalkeeper

Team information
- Current team: Villarreal
- Number: 13

Youth career
- 2008–2010: Alzira
- 2010–2016: Valencia
- 2016–2017: Promeses Sueca
- 2017–2019: Alzira
- 2019–2020: Roda
- 2020–2021: Villarreal

Senior career*
Years	Team	Apps	(Gls)
2021–2023	Villarreal C	41	(0)
2023–2026	Villarreal B	44	(0)
2026–	Villarreal	0	(0)
- * Club domestic league appearances and goals as of 26 May 2026

Rubén Gómez Peris (born 24 January 2002) is a Spanish footballer who plays as a goalkeeper for La Liga club Villarreal CF.

== Career ==
Born in Alzira, Valencian Community, Gómez joined Valencia CF's youth setup in 2010, from hometown side UD Alzira. He left the club in 2016 after being deemed surplus to requirements, and spent a year at CF Promeses Sueca before returning to his first club Alzira in 2017.

Gómez joined Villarreal CF's youth sides in 2019 from Alzira, but spent his first season with affiliate side CD Roda. He made his senior debut with the C-team on 7 February 2021, coming on as a first-half substitute for field player Javier Comeras as starter Jaime Durán was sent-off in a 0–0 Tercera División home draw against CD Benicarló.

In June 2023, after establishing himself as a starter for the C-team, Gómez renewed his contract with the Yellow Submarine and was promoted to the reserves in Segunda División. He made his professional debut on 3 February of the following year, starting in a 3–0 away loss to CD Mirandés.

A backup to Iker Álvarez in the B-side, Gómez renewed his contract with Villarreal until 2027 on 9 January 2025. He became an undisputed starter after Álvarez left, and was promoted to the first team in La Liga in August 2026.

== Career statistics ==
As of match played 24 May 2025

Appearances and goals by club, season and competition
Club	Season	League			Cup		Europe		Other		Total	
Club	Season	Division	Apps	Goals	Apps	Goals	Apps	Goals	Apps	Goals	Apps	Goals
Villarreal C	2020–21	Tercera División	1	0	—		—		—		1	0
Villarreal C	2021–22	Tercera Federación	16	0	—		—		—		16	0
Villarreal C	2022–23	Tercera Federación	24	0	—		—		—		24	0
Villarreal C	Total		41	0	—		—		—		41	0
Villarreal B	2023–24	Segunda División	1	0	—		—		—		1	0
Villarreal B	2024–25	Primera Federación	9	0	—		—		—		9	0
Villarreal B	Total		10	0	—		—		—		10	0
Villarreal	2024–25	La Liga	0	0	0	0	—		—		0	0
Villarreal	2025–26	La Liga	0	0	0	0	—		—		0	0
Villarreal	Total		41	0	0	0	—		—		0	0
Career total			51	0	0	0	0	0	0	0	51	0
