= Carlos Maciá =

Spanish footballer (born 2008)

Personal information
- Full name: Carlos Maciá Coves
- Date of birth: 1 September 2008 (age 18)
- Place of birth: Elche, Spain
- Height: 1.90 m (6 ft 3 in)
- Position: Midfielder

Team information
- Current team: Villarreal
- Number: 16

Youth career
- 2014–2016: Intangco
- 2016–2024: Elche
- 2024–2025: Roda

Senior career*
Years	Team	Apps	(Gls)
2025–2026	Villarreal B	25	(0)
2025–	Villarreal	14	(0)

International career^{‡}
2025–	Spain U18	3	(0)
- * Club domestic league appearances and goals as of 22 November 2026 ‡ National team caps and goals as of 18:16, 9 December 2025 (UTC)

Carlos Maciá Coves (born 1 September 2008) is a Spanish professional footballer who plays as a midfielder for La Liga club Villarreal.

== Career ==
Maciá is a product of the youth academies of the Spanish clubs SCD Intangco and Elche before signing a pre-contract with Villarreal on 7 June 2024; he was initially assigned to affiliate team Roda. He started the 2025–26 season with Villarreal's reserves in the Primera Federación.

On 28 October 2025, Maciá extended his contract with Villarreal until 2029. On 6 December 2025, he made his debut with the senior Villarreal side as a substitute in a 2–0 La Liga win over Getafe.

In July 2026, after impressing in the pre-season, Maciá was definitively promoted to the senior squad.

== International career ==
Maciá was called up to the Spain U18s for a friendly tournament in October 2025.

== Career statistics ==
As of match played 22 November 2026

Appearances and goals by club, season and competition
Club	Season	League			Cup (Note: Includes Copa del Rey)		Europe		Total	
Club	Season	Division	Apps	Goals	Apps	Goals	Apps	Goals	Apps	Goals
Villarreal B	2025–26	Primera Federación	25	0	—		—		25	0
Villarreal	2025–26	La Liga	5	0	1	0	—		6	0
Villarreal	2026–27	La Liga	9	0	1	0	1 (Note: Appearance in UEFA Champions League)	0	11	0
Villarreal	Total		14	0	2	0	1	0	17	0
Career total			39	0	2	0	1	0	42	0
