= Nizar El Jmili =

Spanish footballer (born 2004)

Personal information
- Full name: Nizar El Jmili Ben Hamou
- Date of birth: 30 November 2004 (age 21)
- Place of birth: Vila-Real, Spain
- Height: 1.72 m (5 ft 8 in)
- Position: Winger

Team information
- Current team: Villarreal B
- Number: 17

Youth career
- 2013–2014: Roda
- 2014–2015: Salesianos Burriana
- 2015–2017: Valencia
- 2017–2018: Roda
- 2018–2020: Villarreal
- 2020–2022: Almazora
- 2022–2023: Roda

Senior career*
| Years | Team | Apps | (Gls) |
| 2023–2024 | Roda B | 24 | (1) |
| 2024–2025 | Roda | 36 | (11) |
| 2025–2026 | Villarreal C | 15 | (3) |
| 2026– | Villarreal B | 25 | (3) |
| 2026– | Villarreal | 1 | (0) |
- * Club domestic league appearances and goals as of 10 October 2026

Nizar El Jmili Ben Hamou (born 30 November 2004), sometimes known as just Nizar, is a Spanish footballer who plays as a winger for Villarreal CF B.

== Club career ==
Born in Vila-Real, in the Province of Castellón, Valencian Community, El Jmili began his career with CD Roda, later having short spells with the youth sides of Valencia CF and Villarreal CF before returning to Roda in 2022. After making his senior debut with the latter's reserves in 2023, he was promoted to the first team in Tercera Federación in July 2024.

In May 2025, El Jimli returned to Villarreal and was initially assigned to the C-team also in the fifth division. He started to appear with the B-side in Primera Federación in January 2026, and renewed his contract for a further year on 12 May.

On 7 October 2026, after becoming an undisputed starter with the B's, El Jimli further extended his link with the Yellow Submarine until 2030. He made his first team – and La Liga – debut three days later, coming on as a late substitute for Alberto Moleiro in a 1–0 away loss to Real Madrid.

== International career ==
El Jimli is of Moroccan descent, being eligible to play for the country or Spain at international level.
