= Santiago Mouriño =

Uruguayan footballer (born 2002)

Personal information
- Full name: Álvaro Santiago Mouriño González
- Date of birth: 13 February 2002 (age 24)
- Place of birth: Montevideo, Uruguay
- Height: 1.86 m (6 ft 1 in)
- Positions: Centre-back; right-back

Team information
- Current team: Villarreal
- Number: 15

Youth career
- 2015–2021: Nacional

Senior career*
Years	Team	Apps	(Gls)
2022–2023	Racing Montevideo	29	(0)
2023–2024	Atlético Madrid	0	(0)
2023–2024	→ Zaragoza (loan)	28	(1)
2024–2025	Alavés	25	(0)
2025	Atlético Madrid	0	(0)
2025–	Villarreal	37	(1)

International career^{‡}
2025–	Uruguay	3	(0)
- * Club domestic league appearances and goals as of 8 November 2026 ‡ National team caps and goals as of 18 November 2026

Álvaro Santiago Mouriño González (born 13 February 2002) is a Uruguayan professional footballer who plays as a centre-back or right-back for La Liga club Villarreal and the Uruguay national team.

== Club career ==
=== Racing Montevideo ===
Mouriño played with Nacional as a youngster but left the club in 2021 without signing a professional contract, although they maintained a percentage of his ownership. He joined Racing Montevideo in January 2022 and made his professional debut on 22 May 2022 as a second-half substitute in a 2–0 win against Progreso.

Mouriño would go on to play fifteen league games in 2022 as Racing returned to the top flight of Uruguayan football after being crowned champions of the 2022 Segunda División. He made his Primera División debut on 4 February 2023, starting in a 2–0 loss against Boston River.

=== Atlético Madrid ===
On 6 July 2023, Mouriño signed a five-year contract with La Liga side Atlético Madrid.

==== Loan to Zaragoza ====
On 11 August 2023, Mouriño joined Segunda División club Real Zaragoza on a season long loan deal.

=== Alavés ===
On 27 August 2024, Mouriño signed a five-year contract with Spanish top tier club Deportivo Alavés.

=== Villarreal ===
On 1 August 2025, Atlético Madrid exercised the buy-back option in Mouriño's contract. He was sold to Villarreal on the same day, where he signed a five-year contract.

== International career ==
In June 2023, Mouriño received his first call-up to the Uruguay national team for friendly matches against Nicaragua and Cuba. He made his debut on 10 October 2025 in a 1–0 friendly win against the Dominican Republic.

== Career statistics ==
=== Club ===
As of match played 8 November 2026

Appearances and goals by club, season and competition
Club	Season	League			National cup (Note: Includes Copa Uruguay, Copa del Rey)		Continental		Total	
Club	Season	Division	Apps	Goals	Apps	Goals	Apps	Goals	Apps	Goals
Racing Montevideo	2022	Uruguayan Segunda División	15	0	2	0	—		17	0
Racing Montevideo	2023	Liga AUF Uruguaya	14	0	0	0	—		14	0
Racing Montevideo	Total		29	0	2	0	—		31	0
Zaragoza (loan)	2023–24	Segunda División	28	1	1	0	—		29	1
Alavés	2024–25	La Liga	25	0	2	0	—		27	0
Villarreal	2025–26	La Liga	28	1	0	0	6 (Note: Appearances in UEFA Champions League)	0	34	1
Villarreal	2026–27	La Liga	9	0	1	0	4	2	14	2
Villarreal	Total		37	1	1	0	10	2	48	3
Career total			119	2	6	0	10	2	135	4

=== International ===
As of match played 17 November 2026

Appearances and goals by national team and year
National team	Year	Apps	Goals
Uruguay	2025	1	0
Uruguay	2026	2	0
Total		3	0

== Honours ==
Racing Montevideo

- Uruguayan Segunda División: 2022

Individual

- La Liga Team of the Season: 2025–26
