= Tajon Buchanan =

Canadian soccer player (born 1999)

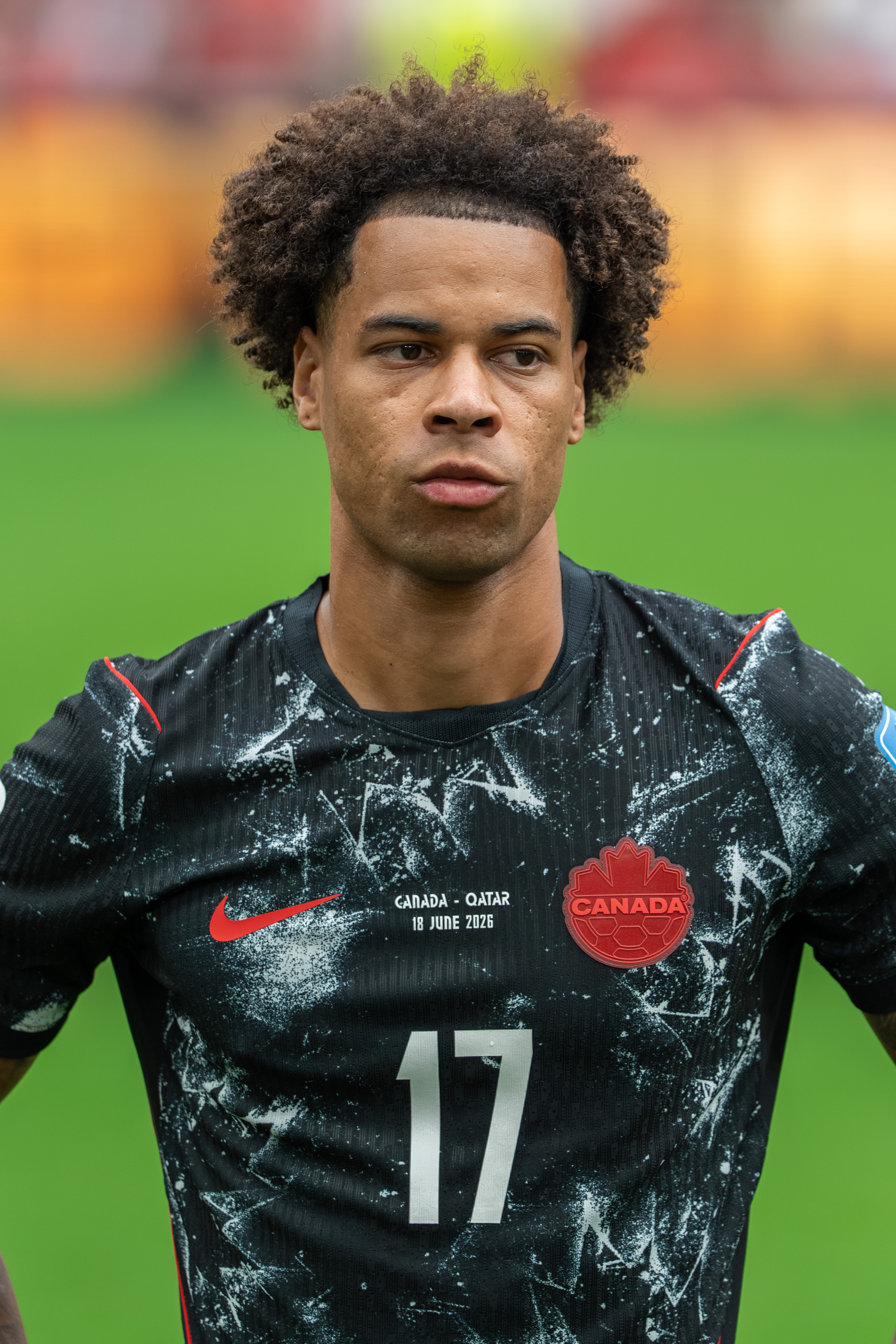
- Buchanan with Canada in 2026

Personal information
- Full name: Tajon Trevor Buchanan
- Date of birth: February 8, 1999 (age 27)
- Place of birth: Brampton, Ontario, Canada
- Height: 1.83 m (6 ft 0 in)
- Positions: Full-back; winger

Team information
- Current team: Villarreal
- Number: 17

Youth career
- 2007–2012: Brampton YSC
- 2012–2014: Mississauga Falcons
- 2015–2017: Real Colorado

College career
Years	Team	Apps	(Gls)
2017–2018	Syracuse Orange	33	(12)

Senior career*
Years	Team	Apps	(Gls)
2018	Sigma	7	(2)
2019–2021	New England Revolution	50	(8)
2021–2024	Club Brugge	50	(4)
2021	→ New England Revolution (loan)	10	(2)
2024–2025	Inter Milan	16	(1)
2025	→ Villarreal (loan)	13	(1)
2025–	Villarreal	45	(9)

International career^{‡}
2021	Canada U23	4	(2)
2021–	Canada	69	(9)
Medal record
Men's soccer
Representing Canada
CONCACAF Nations League
Runner-up	2023
Third place	2025
- * Club domestic league appearances and goals as of November 22, 2026 ‡ National team caps and goals as of November 16, 2026

Tajon Trevor Buchanan (born February 8, 1999) is a Canadian professional soccer player who plays for La Liga club Villarreal and the Canada national team. Known for his speed and technical ability, he usually plays as a wide midfielder, but can also be deployed as a full-back.

== Club career ==
=== Early career ===
Buchanan was born and raised in Brampton, Ontario and is of Jamaican descent. His father died when Buchanan was seven years old. He began playing soccer with Brampton Youth, when he was eight. Buchanan won the 2014 IMG Cup with the Mississauga Falcons. At age 15, he moved with his best friend and his best friend's father (and his former coach), Chrys Chrysanthou, to Colorado where he joined the USSDA academy Real Colorado.

Buchanan spent two years playing college soccer at Syracuse University between 2017 and 2018, making 33 appearances, scoring 12 goals and tallying six assists. After two years with the Orange, Buchanan left early and signed a Generation Adidas contract with Major League Soccer ahead of the 2019 MLS SuperDraft.

In summer 2018, Buchanan played for League1 Ontario side Sigma FC, making seven appearances and scoring two goals.

=== New England Revolution ===
On January 11, 2019, Buchanan was selected ninth overall in the 2019 MLS SuperDraft by New England Revolution. He made his professional debut on March 9, 2019, as an 81st-minute substitute during a 2–0 loss to Columbus Crew. He scored his first career goal on September 12, 2020, in a 2-1 loss to the Philadelphia Union.

On November 24, 2020, he scored his first MLS Cup playoffs goal, scoring the second and final goal in a 2–0 win over the Philadelphia Union.

On July 3, 2021, Buchanan scored the first goal in the history of Lower.com Field, in the Revolution's 2-2 draw against Columbus Crew.

During the 2021 season, Buchanan's continued good form for the Revolution earned him a nomination to the MLS squad for the 2021 MLS All-Star Game in August 2021.

=== Club Brugge ===
In August 2021, Buchanan signed a three-and-a-half-year deal with Belgian First Division A champions Club Brugge. Buchanan was loaned back to New England Revolution for the remainder of the 2021 MLS season. The $7 million transfer fee (with a 10% sell-on clause) paid by Club Brugge was a club-record received by the Revolution for one of their players.

He made his debut for Brugge against Sint-Truiden on January 15, 2022. Buchanan scored his first goal for Brugge on April 24 against Royal Antwerp.

=== Inter Milan ===
On January 5, 2024, Buchanan officially joined Serie A club Inter Milan for a reported fee of €7 million, plus €3 million in add-ons, signing a four-and-a-half-year deal with the Italian club. In the process, he became Serie A's first ever Canadian player.

Buchanan made his debut for his new club on February 16, as a substitute for Alessandro Bastoni in a 4–0 victory over Salernitana. On May 10, 2024, Buchanan scored his first goal for Inter, scoring the third goal in a 5–0 victory against Frosinone, to become the first Canadian to score in Serie A.

=== Loan and move to Villarreal ===
On February 1, 2025, Buchanan joined Villarreal in Spain on loan with an option to buy. On July 29, 2025, Buchanan made his move to Villarreal permanent, as Inter and Villarreal agreed on a fee of $14.4 million CAD, with the Serie A club receiving 20% of any future sale.

On August 24, 2025, Buchanan scored a hat-trick in a 5–0 home win over Girona, becoming the first Canadian to score a hat-trick in La Liga and the second Canadian to score one in Europe’s top five leagues, after Jonathan David.

== International career ==
=== Youth ===
Buchanan was named to the Canadian U-23 provisional roster for the 2020 CONCACAF Men's Olympic Qualifying Championship on February 26, 2020. A year later, he was named to the final squad for the rescheduled tournament on March 10, 2021.

In Canada's opening match, Buchanan scored a brace in a 2–0 victory over El Salvador. He was named the 2020 Canada Soccer Youth International Player of the Year.

=== Senior ===
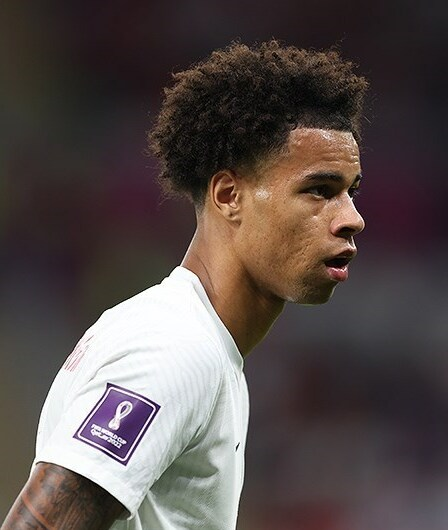
Buchanan with Canada at the 2022 FIFA World Cup.

Buchanan accepted an invite for the Canada senior national team camp for January 2021. Buchanan was called up in June 2021 for the coming World Cup qualification matches against Aruba and Suriname, and subsequently made his senior-team debut against Aruba, setting up two goals in a 7–0 victory. On June 18, Buchanan was named to Canada's 60-man preliminary squad for the 2021 CONCACAF Gold Cup.

On July 1 he was called up to the final 23-man squad. He scored his first goal for the senior team on July 29 against Mexico in the semi-final stage of the Gold Cup, netting the equalizer in an eventual 2–1 defeat. Buchanan's play at the tournament was widely praised by the region's media and at the conclusion of the competition he was named as the recipient of the 2021 CONCACAF Gold Cup Best Young Player Award.

In November 2022, Buchanan was named to Canada's squad for the 2022 FIFA World Cup. In Canada's second match on November 27 against Croatia, the team scored their first ever goal at a men's World Cup, with Buchanan sending in a cross that was met by the head of Alphonso Davies and sent into the back of the net.

In June 2023, Buchanan was named to the 23-man squad for Canada ahead of the 2023 CONCACAF Nations League Finals. In June 2024, Buchanan was named to the Canadian squad for the 2024 Copa América. After Canada advanced to the knockout phase, Buchanan would suffer a broken tibia while training for the quarterfinal match against Venezuela, and would undergo surgery to repair the fracture.

In May 2026, Buchanan was selected for Canada's squad for the 2026 FIFA World Cup.

== Career statistics ==
=== Club ===
As of match played November 22, 2026

Appearances and goals by club, season and competition
Club	Season	League			National cup (Note: Includes U.S. Open Cup, Belgian Cup, Coppa Italia, Copa del Rey)		Continental		Other		Total	
Club	Season	Division	Apps	Goals	Apps	Goals	Apps	Goals	Apps	Goals	Apps	Goals
Sigma	2018	League1 Ontario	7	2	—		—		—		7	2
New England Revolution	2019	MLS	10	0	1	0	—		—		11	0
New England Revolution	2020	MLS	23 (Note: Includes three appearances in MLS is Back Tournament group stage)	2	—		—		5 (Note: One appearance in MLS is Back Tournament knockout stage, four appearances and one goal in MLS Cup playoffs)	1	28	3
New England Revolution	2021 (Note: Part of this season was spent on loan from Club Brugge)	MLS	27	8	0	0	0	0	1 (Note: Appearance in MLS Cup playoffs)	1	28	9
New England Revolution	Total		60	10	1	0	0	0	6	2	67	12
Club Brugge	2021–22	Belgian Pro League	14	1	1	0	—		—		15	1
Club Brugge	2022–23	Belgian Pro League	24	1	2	0	6 (Note: Appearances in UEFA Champions League)	0	0	0	32	1
Club Brugge	2023–24	Belgian Pro League	12	2	0	0	8 (Note: Appearances in UEFA Europa Conference League)	1	—		20	3
Club Brugge	Total		50	4	3	0	14	1	0	0	67	5
Inter Milan	2023–24	Serie A	10	1	—		0	0	—		10	1
Inter Milan	2024–25	Serie A	6	0	1	0	0	0	0	0	7	0
Inter Milan	Total		16	1	1	0	0	0	0	0	17	1
Villarreal (loan)	2024–25	La Liga	13	1	—		—		—		13	1
Villarreal	2025–26	La Liga	34	7	2	0	7	0	—		43	7
Villarreal	2026–27	La Liga	11	2	0	0	3	0	—		14	2
Villarreal	Villarreal total		58	10	2	0	10	0	—		70	10
Career total			191	27	7	0	24	1	6	2	228	30

=== International ===
As of match played November 16, 2026

Appearances and goals by national team and year
National team	Year	Apps	Goals
Canada	2021	16	3
Canada	2022	13	1
Canada	2023	6	0
Canada	2024	8	0
Canada	2025	14	4
Canada	2026	12	1
Total		69	9

Scores and results list Canada's goal tally first, score column indicates score after each Buchanan goal.

List of international goals scored by Tajon Buchanan
No.	Date	Venue	Opponent	Score	Result	Competition
1	July 29, 2021	NRG Stadium, Houston, United States	Mexico	1–1	1–2	2021 CONCACAF Gold Cup
2	September 8, 2021	BMO Field, Toronto, Canada	El Salvador	3–0	3–0	2022 FIFA World Cup qualification
3	October 13, 2021	BMO Field, Toronto, Canada	Panama	3–1	4–1	2022 FIFA World Cup qualification
4	March 27, 2022	BMO Field, Toronto, Canada	Jamaica	2–0	4–0	2022 FIFA World Cup qualification
5	June 7, 2025	BMO Field, Toronto, Canada	Ukraine	4–0	4–2	2025 Canadian Shield
6	June 17, 2025	BC Place, Vancouver, Canada	Honduras	3–0	6–0	2025 CONCACAF Gold Cup
7	June 17, 2025	BC Place, Vancouver, Canada	Honduras	4–0	6–0	2025 CONCACAF Gold Cup
8	June 24, 2025	Shell Energy Stadium, Houston, United States	El Salvador	2–0	2–0	2025 CONCACAF Gold Cup
9	November 16, 2026	BMO Field, Toronto, Canada	Guatemala	3–1	4–1	2026–27 CONCACAF Nations League A

== Honours ==
New England Revolution

- Supporters' Shield: 2021

Club Brugge

- Belgian Pro League: 2021–22, 2023–24

Inter Milan

- Serie A: 2023–24
- Supercoppa Italiana: 2023

Canada

- CONCACAF Nations League runner-up: 2023

Individual

- CONCACAF Gold Cup Best XI: 2021
- CONCACAF Gold Cup Young Player Award: 2021
- MLS Best XI: 2021
- Canadian Youth International Player of the Year: 2020
