= Dani Budesca =

Spanish footballer (born 2006)

Personal information
- Full name: Daniel Budesca López
- Date of birth: 27 May 2006 (age 20)
- Place of birth: Murcia, Spain
- Height: 1.85 m (6 ft 1 in)
- Position: Right-back

Team information
- Current team: Córdoba (on loan from Villarreal)

Youth career
- 2011–2017: Murcia
- 2017–2022: Villarreal
- 2022–2023: Roda
- 2023–2024: Villarreal

Senior career*
Years	Team	Apps	(Gls)
2024–2025	Villarreal C	9	(0)
2024–2026	Villarreal B	50	(1)
2026–	Villarreal	0	(0)
2026–	→ Córdoba (loan)	0	(0)

International career^{‡}
2021–2022	Spain U16	4	(0)
2023	Spain U17	1	(0)
2024	Spain U18	1	(0)
2025–	Spain U19	1	(0)
- * Club domestic league appearances and goals as of 26 May 2026 ‡ National team caps and goals as of 15:13, 28 January 2026 (UTC)

Daniel "Dani" Budesca López (born 27 May 2006) is a Spanish professional footballer who plays as a right-back for Córdoba CF, on loan from Villarreal CF.

== Club career ==
Budesca is a product of the youth academies of Real Murcia CF and Villarreal CF. In 2022, he signed his first professional contract with the latter until 2024, and further extended his link until 2027 on 4 January 2023.

Budesca made his senior debut with the C-team on 27 January 2024, in a 2–0 Tercera Federación away loss to CD Roda. He was promoted to Villarreal B in the Primera Federación for the 2024–25 season.

Budesca made his professional debut with the Yellow Submarine on 28 January 2026, coming on as a substitute in a 3–0 UEFA Champions League loss to Bayer 04 Leverkusen. On 18 August, he renewed his contract until 2031, and was loaned to Segunda División side Córdoba CF the following day.

== International career ==
Budesca is a youth international for Spain, having been first called up to the Spain U16s for friendlies in 2021 and 2022.
