= Alassane Diatta =

Senegalese footballer (born 2005)

Personal information
- Date of birth: 14 May 2005 (age 21)
- Place of birth: Diouloulou, Senegal
- Height: 1.90 m (6 ft 3 in)
- Position: Midfielder

Team information
- Current team: Villarreal
- Number: 5

Youth career
- Mbour Petite-Côte
- 2022–2023: Keur Madior FC
- 2023–2024: Villarreal

Senior career*
Years	Team	Apps	(Gls)
2024–2026	Villarreal B	60	(6)
2024–	Villarreal	1	(0)
- * Club domestic league appearances and goals as of 27 May 2026 ‡ National team caps and goals as of 15:13, 28 January 2026 (UTC)

Alassane Diatta (born 14 May 2005) is a Senegalese professional footballer who plays as a midfielder for La Liga club Villarreal.

== Club career ==
Diatta is a product of the youth academies of the Senegalese clubs Mbour Petite-Côte and Keur Madior FC, before moving to Villarreal's academy on 18 November 2023 on a 4-year contract. He was promoted to Villarreal B in the Primera Federación for the 2024–25 season. He debuted with the senior Villarreal team as a substitute in a 1–0 Copa del Rey loss to Pontevedra on 4 December 2024.

On 12 December 2025, Diatta renewed his contract with the Yellow Submarine until 2030. The following July, after impressing in the pre-season, he was promoted to the first team in La Liga.

== Career statistics ==
As of 1 September 2026

Appearances and goals by club, season and competition
Club	Season	League			Cup		Europe		Other		Total	
Club	Season	Division	Apps	Goals	Apps	Goals	Apps	Goals	Apps	Goals	Apps	Goals
Villarreal B	2024–25	Primera Federación	28	1	—		—		—		28	1
Villarreal B	2025–26	Primera Federación	32	5	—		—		—		32	5
Villarreal B	Total		60	6	—		—		—		60	6
Villarreal	2024–25	La Liga	0	0	1	0	—		—		1	0
Villarreal	2025–26	La Liga	1	0	0	0	1 (Note: Appearances in UEFA Champions League)	0	—		2	0
Villarreal	2026–27	La Liga	0	0	0	0	0	0	—		0	0
Villarreal	Total		1	0	1	0	1	0	—		3	0
Career total			62	6	1	0	0	0	0	0	63	6
