= Villarreal CF C =

Spanish football team

Villarreal C
- Full name: Villarreal Club de Fútbol, S.A.D. "C"
- Nicknames: El Submarino Amarillo (Yellow Submarine)
- Founded: 2002
- Ground: Ciudad Deportiva José Manuel Llaneza "Mini Estadi", Villarreal, Valencia, Spain
- Capacity: 5,000
- President: Fernando Roig
- Head coach: David Cifuentes
- League: Tercera Federación – Group 6
- 2025–26: Tercera Federación – Group 6, 4th of 18
Home colours	Away colours

Villarreal Club de Fútbol "C" is the third team of Villarreal CF, a Spanish football team based in Villarreal, in the autonomous community of Valencia. Founded in 2002, and plays in Tercera Federación – Group 6, holding home games at Ciudad Deportiva Villarreal CF, with a capacity of 5,000 seats.

The team must play at least one division below Villarreal CF B, who must themselves play one division lower than the main Villarreal club. Neither reserve team can enter the Copa del Rey.

== Season to season ==
Season	Tier	Division	Place
2002–03	7	2ª Reg.	1st
2003–04	6	1ª Reg.	1st
2004–05	5	Reg. Pref.	2nd
2005–06	5	Reg. Pref.	2nd
2006–07	5	Reg. Pref.	1st
2007–08	4	3ª	8th
2008–09	4	3ª	9th
2009–10	4	3ª	4th
2010–11	4	3ª	6th
2011–12	4	3ª	11th
2012–13	4	3ª	7th
2013–14	4	3ª	14th
2014–15	4	3ª	4th
2015–16	4	3ª	5th
2016–17	4	3ª	7th
2017–18	4	3ª	8th
2018–19	4	3ª	10th
2019–20	4	3ª	4th
2020–21	4	3ª	4th / 1st
2021–22	5	3ª RFEF	9th

Season	Tier	Division	Place
2022–23	5	3ª Fed.	8th
2023–24	5	3ª Fed.	8th
2024–25	5	3ª Fed.	6th
2025–26	5	3ª Fed.	4th
2026–27	5	3ª Fed.	

- 14 seasons in Tercera División
- 6 seasons in Tercera Federación/Tercera División RFEF

== Players ==
=== Current squad ===
As of 24 December 2024.

Note: Flags indicate national team as defined under FIFA eligibility rules; some limited exceptions apply. Players may hold more than one non-FIFA nationality.

No.	Pos.	Nation	Player
1	GK	ESP	Enrique Bartual
2	DF	ESP	Daniel Budesca
3	DF	SEN	Baye Mbaye
4	DF	ESP	Kevin Jesús Martel
5	DF	ESP	Francisco Gil
6	MF	ESP	Joan Ruiz (captain)
7	FW	ESP	Celso José Bermejo
8	MF	ESP	Adrián Ruiz
9	FW	ESP	Eduardo Joel Sánchez
10	MF	ESP	Sergio Hinojosa
11	MF	ESP	Mario Linares
12	MF	ESP	José Manuel Pedrosa
13	GK	ESP	Rodrigo Rocafort

No.	Pos.	Nation	Player
14	MF	GBS	Vique Domingos Gomes
15	MF	SEN	Alassane Diatta
16	MF	UKR	Mykyta Alexandrov
17	FW	ESP	Jaime Fernández
18	MF	SEN	Alassane Diatta
19	FW	MLI	Douga Fofana
20	MF	ESP	Mario Gil
21	MF	ESP	Unax del Cura
22	FW	ESP	Toni Tamarit
23	DF	CIV	Jean Ives Valou
24	FW	IRL	Caden McLoughlin
25	GK	ESP	Adrián Suárez

=== From Youth Academy ===
Note: Flags indicate national team as defined under FIFA eligibility rules; some limited exceptions apply. Players may hold more than one non-FIFA nationality.

No.	Pos.	Nation	Player
26	MF	ESP	Carlos Jiménez
28	DF	ESP	César Bonafé
30	FW	ESP	Javier Aznar
—	DF	ESP	Teo Bou

No.	Pos.	Nation	Player
—	DF	ESP	Pedro Luque
—	MF	ESP	Roberto Owono
—	FW	ESP	Paco Fernández
—	FW	ESP	Sergio Vinatea

== Coaching staff ==
Position	Staff
Head coach	(Spain) David Albelda
Assistant coach	(Spain) Jacint Guimerà
Goalkeeping coach	(Spain) Joel Garzón
Delegate	(Spain) Alexandre Sánchez
Fitness Coach	(Spain) Alejandro Valle (Spain) Raúl Tabernero
Technical assistant	(Spain) Édgar Chumillas
Analyst	(South Korea) Gyeonghoon Kang
Doctor	(Spain) Santiago Pina (Spain) Miguel Piera (Spain) Gerard Manzanet
Physiotherapist	(Spain) Albert Feliu
Rehab fitness coach	(Spain) Eduardo Alija
Psychologist & Equipment Manager	(Spain) Neus Ramos

Last updated: September 2022
Source: FFCV
