= Villarreal CF =

Association football club in Spain

Villarreal
- Full name: Villarreal Club de Fútbol, S.A.D.
- Nicknames: El Submarino Amarillo (The Yellow Submarine)
- Founded: 10 March 1923; 103 years ago
- Stadium: Estadio de la Cerámica
- Capacity: 23,008
- Owner: Fernando Roig
- President: Fernando Roig
- Head coach: Iñigo Pérez
- League: La Liga
- 2025–26: La Liga, 3rd of 20
- Website: villarrealcf.es
| Home colours | Away colours | Third colours |

Villarreal Club de Fútbol, S.A.D., usually abbreviated to Villarreal CF, are a Spanish professional football club based in Villarreal, in the Castellón province of eastern Spain, that plays in La Liga, the top flight of Spanish football.

Founded in 1923, the club spent much time of its history in the lower divisions of Spanish football and began in La Liga in 1998. In the 21st century, Villarreal gained some league stability, although they sustained relegation in 2012, rebounding the next year and then remaining in the top division to date. The club made its first appearance in the UEFA Champions League in 2005, with its best result being the semi-finals in 2006 and 2022. Villarreal also appeared in the UEFA Europa League during this time, and won the competition in 2021 by defeating Manchester United in the final, clinching their first major trophy.

The club is nicknamed El Submarí Groguet or El Submarino Amarillo (Yellow Submarine) due to its yellow home kit, and due to being a low-profile team compared to Real Madrid, Barcelona, Atlético Madrid, and regional rivals Valencia. They play their home games at the Estadio de la Cerámica, and have been touted as an example of a small but successful club.

== History ==
=== 1923–29: early years ===
Club Deportivo Villarreal was founded on 10 March 1923 "to promote all sports especially Football." The stadium was rented for 60 pesetas a month and ticket prices were set at half a peseta for men and a quarter of a peseta for children. Women were granted free admission. On 17 June 1923, Castellón, a modern rival of the club, played the first match against a club named after Miguel de Cervantes. On 21 October of that year, Villarreal played their first game ever, playing against Castellón. Villarreal started off with a kit of white shirts and black shorts, reflected in their first badge.

=== 1929–98: time in lower divisions ===
Villarreal entered regional competitions within the Spanish football pyramid from 1929 to 1930 onwards. The 1934–35 season saw the team lose to Cartagena when a win would have seen them promoted to the nationwide Second Division. The following season saw Villarreal win the First Division of the region before the outbreak of the Spanish Civil War.

When the war finished in 1939, the club played again in the Second Division of the region. However, CD Villarreal was dissolved in the early 1940s, and in 1942, CA Foghetecaz, an acronym for the club's founders (Font, Gil, Herrero, Teuler, Catalá and Zaragoza), was one of several clubs established in its place. On 25 August 1947, the new club joined the Valencian Football Federation and in 1950 renamed itself as CAF Villarreal, where the F stood for Foghetecaz.

The name changed again to the current Villarreal CF in June 1954, with a badge similar to the present one. They finished seventh and then fourth twice in the First regional league before being promoted to the Tercera Liga (Third Nationwide) as champions in 1956. They were relegated in 1960–61 after finishing 14th.

The club adopted their present badge in the middle of 1966. In 1966–67, Villarreal returned to the Tercera as champions. In 1970, they reached the national Segunda for the first time. After narrowly avoiding relegation in their first season, they were relegated the following season. In 1975–76, they were relegated from the Tercera to the Regionals, but were promoted back again the next season. In 1986–87, Villarreal were promoted to the Segunda Liga B. In 1990, they finished 18th and were relegated back to the Tercera.

There were back-to-back promotions as the club returned to Segunda B and finished second, earning promotion to Segunda A for the first time. From 1992 to 1997, Villarreal were often in low or mid-table positions, but reached the play-offs in 1997–98 by finishing fourth. The two-legged play-off was against Compostela. Villarreal hosted the first leg which was a 0–0 draw, but the second leg at the home of the Galician team was a 1–1 draw, thus Villarreal were promoted on the away goals rule.

=== 1998–2012: La Liga and European debuts ===
Villarreal's La Liga debut started with a match against reigning European champions Real Madrid at the Santiago Bernabéu Stadium on 31 August 1998 where they lost 4-1 despite taking the lead after 3 minutes. The first home game was against Celta de Vigo the week after. Because of a difficult season, Villarreal were relegated to the Segunda División for the 1999–2000 season, but by finishing third, they were then promoted back to the Primera División.

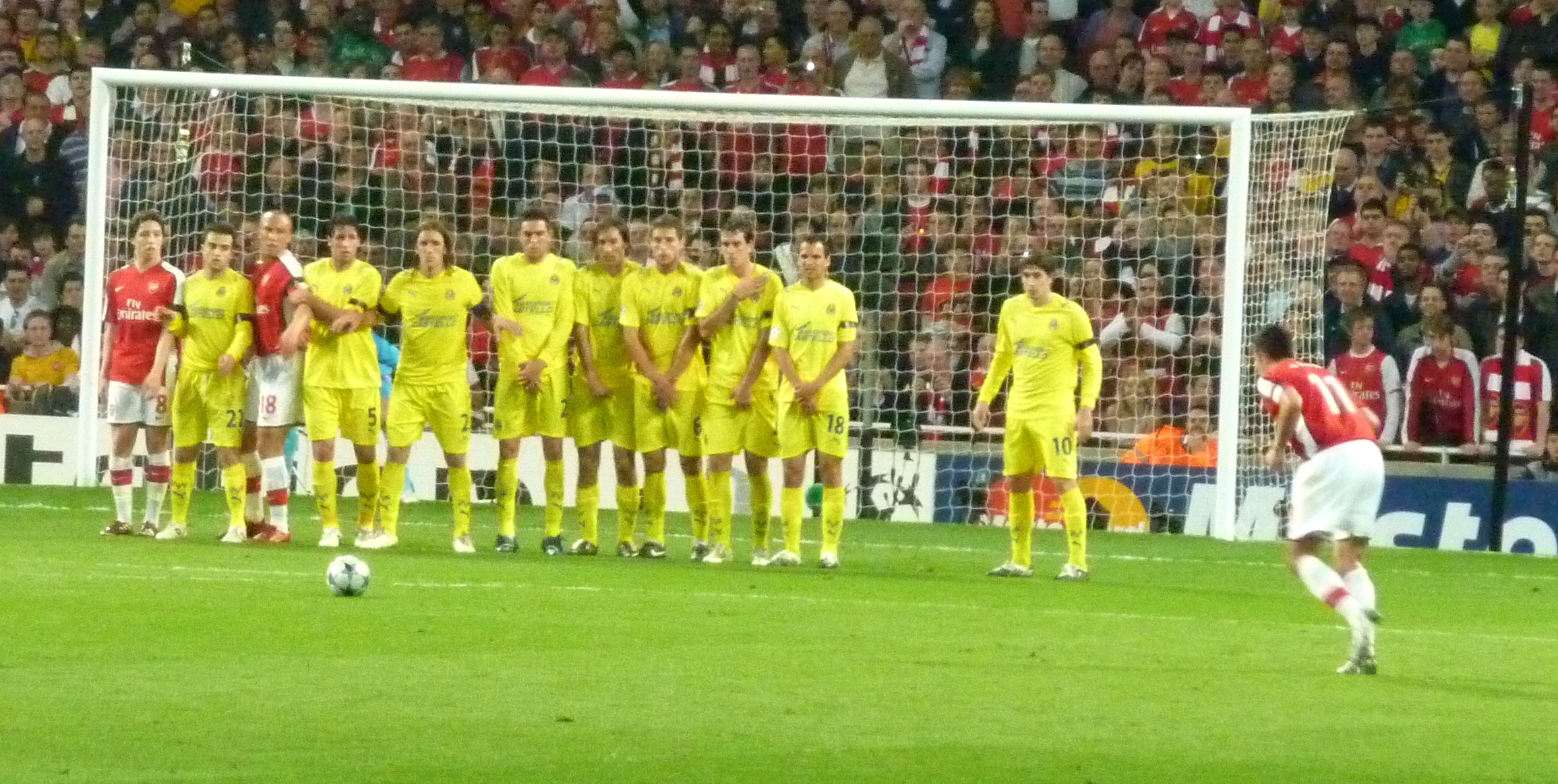
Arsenal FC vs Villarreal CF 2008–09 UEFA Champions League quarter-finals

After finishing seventh on their return to the Primera, Villarreal finished in 15th place for two-straight seasons. Villarreal competed in the UEFA Intertoto Cup in the middle of 2002, defeating FH of Iceland, Torino of Italy, and Troyes of France. They lost in the final to compatriots Málaga, 2–1 on aggregate.

In the middle of 2003, they defeated the Dutch team Heerenveen in the final of the Intertoto Cup, thereby qualifying for the UEFA Cup. In their major European debut, Villarreal reached the semi-finals of the UEFA Cup, losing to neighbours and eventual champions Valencia. In the league, Villarreal finished in eighth place. In the middle of 2004, Villarreal retained the Intertoto Cup, beating compatriots Atlético Madrid on penalties after the final finished 2–2 on aggregate. This qualified them to the UEFA Cup. They lost in the quarter-finals of the 2004–05 UEFA Cup to Dutch side AZ, losing 3–2 on aggregate. During the same season, Villarreal finished in third place in La Liga, earning the club their first direct qualification to a European tournament, the Champions League. The club's centre-forward Diego Forlán won the Pichichi Trophy for top scorer in the league, with 25 goals.

Villarreal defeated the English Premier League's Everton in a play-off for the Champions League group stages. The group saw Villarreal go undefeated, drawing both games against Manchester United and achieving a draw and a win each against Lille of France and Benfica of Portugal. The win over Benfica was away and both teams advanced to the last 16.

The club then drew 3–3 against Rangers of Scotland in the Last 16, advancing on away goals due to a 2–2 draw at Ibrox. In the quarter-finals, Villarreal beat Internazionale on away goals after finishing 2–2 on aggregate. The club bowed out in the semi-finals against Arsenal, losing 1–0 away at Highbury. Juan Román Riquelme had a penalty saved by Jens Lehmann in the home game, which finished 0–0. Arsenal went on to lose in the final in Paris to another Spanish club, Barcelona. Villarreal finished seventh in La Liga, which only earned an Intertoto Cup position.

Chart of Villarreal CF league performance 1929–present

Villarreal contested the Intertoto Cup in the middle of 2006 and was knocked out in its first game, to Maribor of Slovenia. The first leg was lost 2–1 at home and the away game was a 1–1 draw. The team finished 5th in La Liga and qualified for the UEFA Cup. Villarreal gained their best-ever league position in 2008, finishing second to Real Madrid by eight points, and also reached the last 32 in that season's UEFA Cup. After defeating BATE Borisov of Belarus in a play-off, the team won Group C unbeaten. Their group opponents were Fiorentina of Italy, Mladá Boleslav of Czech Republic, IF Elfsborg of Sweden, and AEK Athens of Greece.

In the last 32, Villarreal were defeated by eventual champions Zenit Saint Petersburg, losing the first leg 1–0 in Russia to a Pavel Pogrebnyak goal. The second leg was won 2–1 by Villarreal at El Madrigal, but Zenit advanced on away goals.

The club automatically qualified for the 2008–09 UEFA Champions League by finishing second in La Liga the previous season. They drew Manchester United, for the second consecutive campaign, Celtic, and Aalborg BK. They made a good start by holding current European champions Manchester United to a goal-less draw at Old Trafford, a third 0–0 draw in a row against the English giants. A first win was sealed on 30 September by beating Gordon Strachan's Celtic 1–0 at El Madrigal, courtesy of a Marcos Senna free-kick. On 21 October, during a Champions League match against Aalborg, they scored six goals to three. The Spaniards went through to the knock-out stage after drawing 2–2 with Aalborg in Denmark and drawing goalless once again against Manchester United. In the last group stage match, they lost to an already-eliminated Celtic.

In the knock-out stage, they faced Panathinaikos, who left Villarreal with a 1–1 away advantage, but lost 1–2 in Athens. Villarreal reached the quarter-finals for the second time in two attempts, and were once again paired with Arsenal. The first leg saw a 1–1 draw by a Marcos Senna free kick, equalised by an Emmanuel Adebayor volley. Theo Walcott, Emmanuel Adebayor, and Robin van Persie secured a 3–0 win for Arsenal on the return, knocking Villarreal out of the tournament.

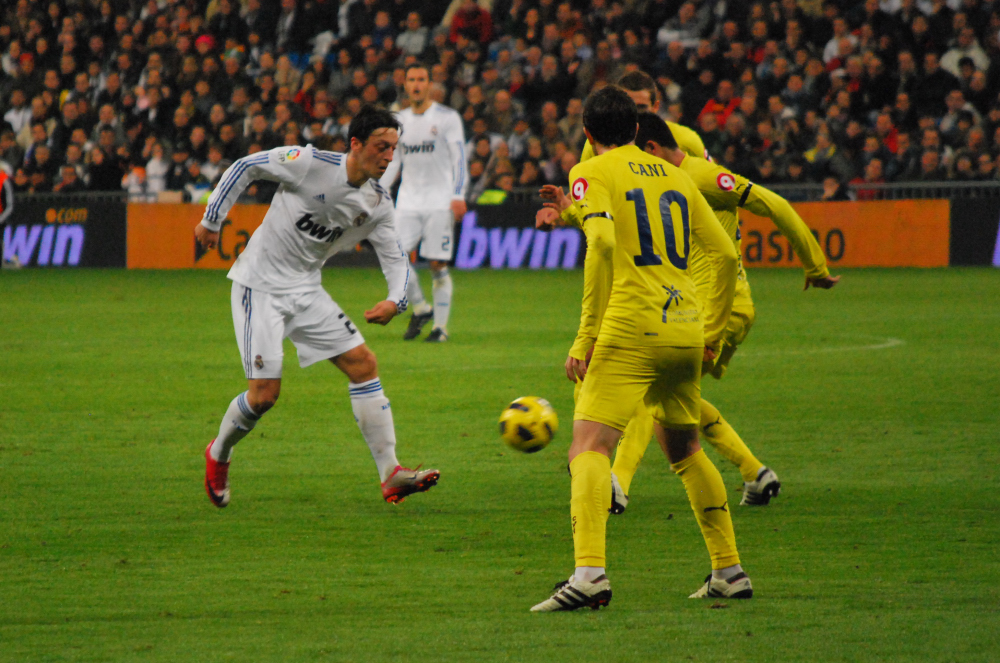
Real Madrid vs. Villarreal in 2011

Despite finishing outside of a European qualifying spot in the domestic league, Villarreal was given a place in the qualifying round of the 2010–11 UEFA Europa League after UEFA determined that Mallorca's financial irregularities precluded them from taking part in the tournament.

A 5–0 home win and a 2–1 away win against Dnepr Mogilev qualified them for the group stage. Villarreal suffered an early setback following a shock 2–0 loss in their away fixture against Dinamo Zagreb. Despite this, however, later wins against Dinamo, Club Brugge and PAOK saw them top their group.

After beating Napoli, Bayer Leverkusen and Twente in the knockout phases, Villarreal qualified for the semi-finals to face tournament favourites Porto. After Villarreal took a 0–1 lead at the Estádio do Dragão, Porto made a remarkable turnaround that ended in a 5–1 defeat for Villarreal. Although Villarreal won the second leg 3–2, Porto's first leg goal total saw them advance to the final on aggregate, where they beat Braga to be crowned champions. Giuseppe Rossi finished as the tournament's second top goalscorer with 11 goals, behind Porto's Radamel Falcao.

=== 2012–present: relegation and European glory ===
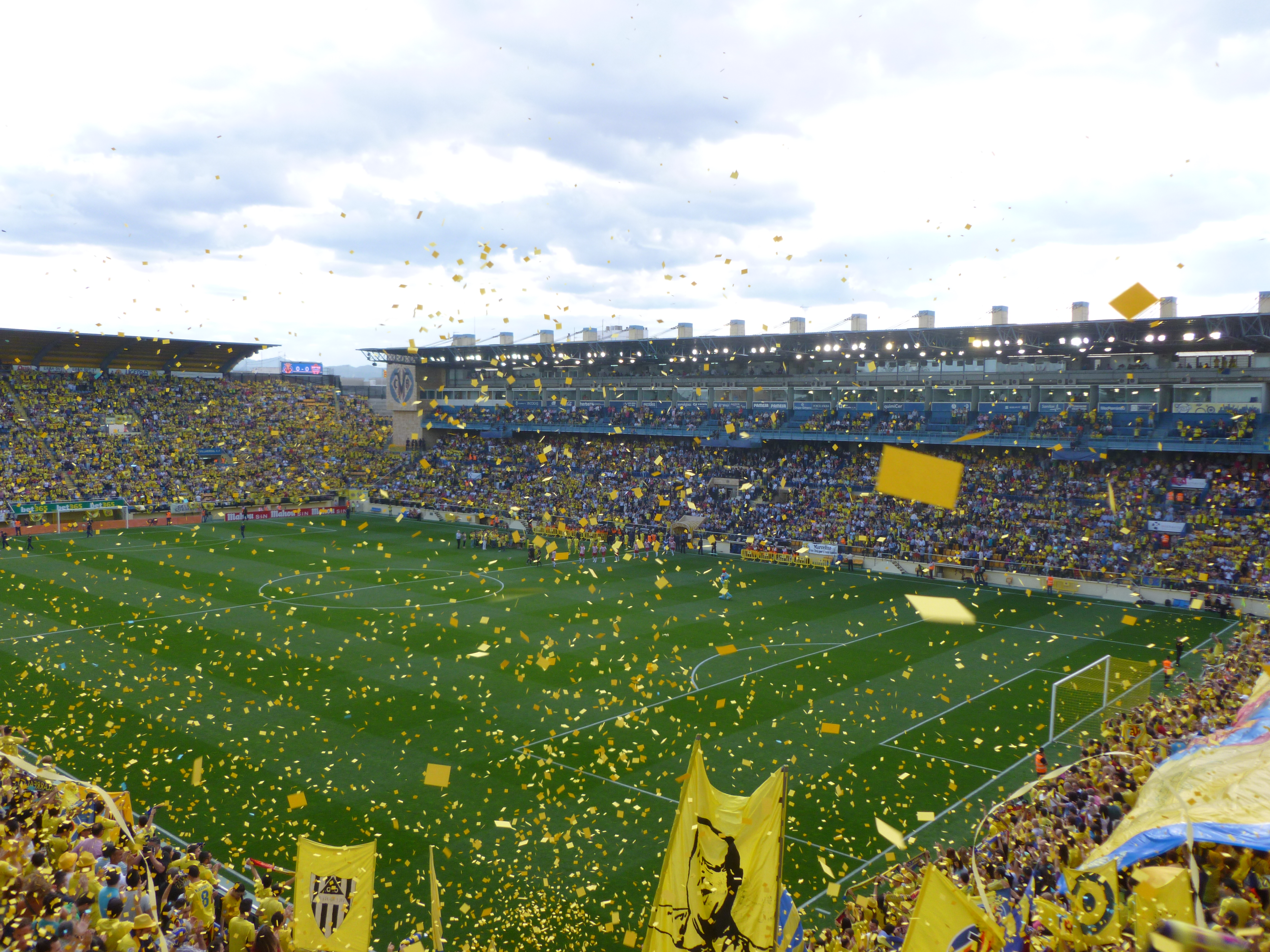
Last match of the 2012–13 season game against UD Almería. Finally, Villarreal won and were promoted to La Liga.

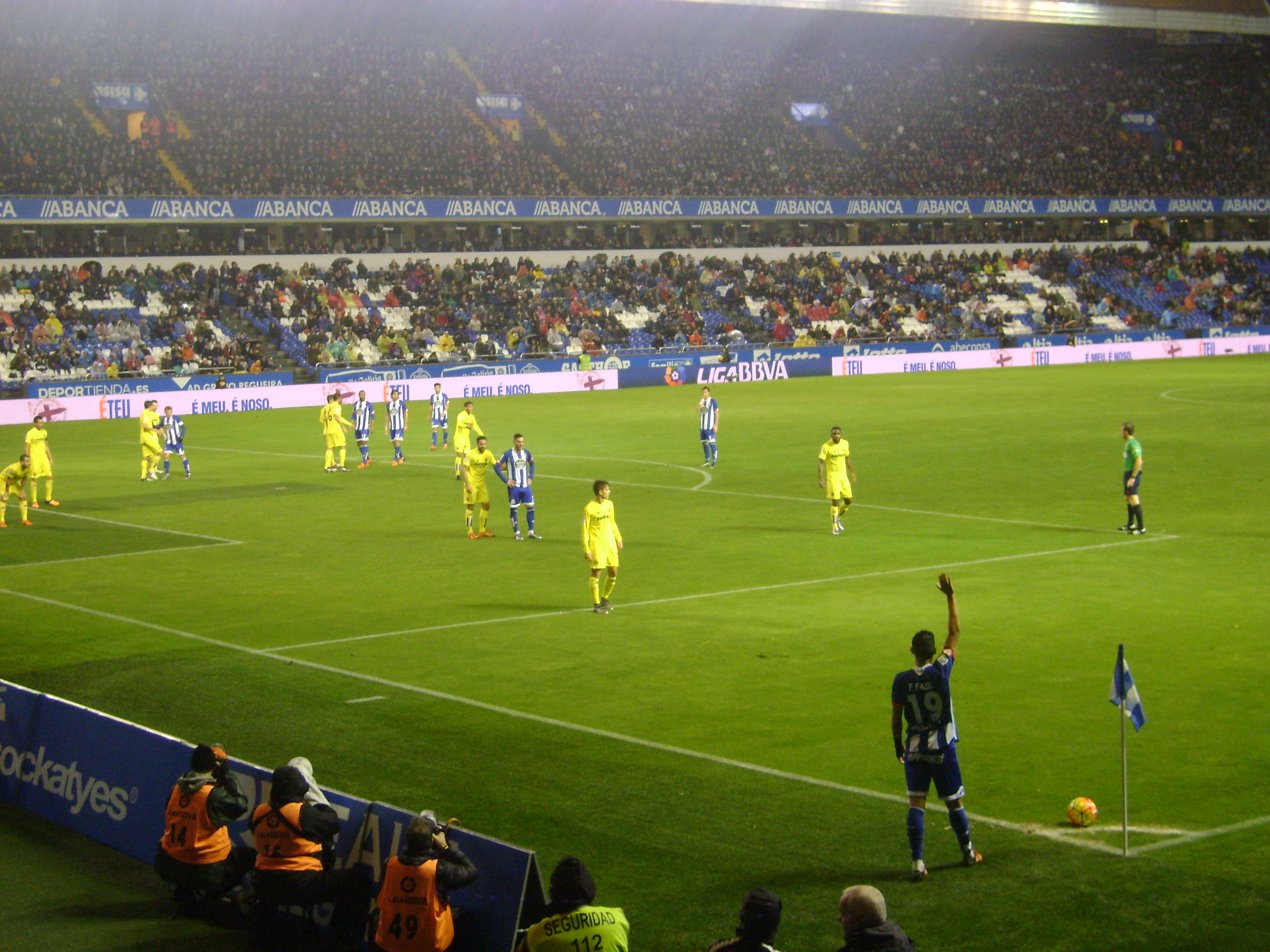
Deportivo de La Coruña vs. Villarreal C. F.

On 13 May 2012, Villarreal were relegated from La Liga after defeat to Atlético Madrid. Following a horrendous season, the club suffered a shattering tragedy when Manolo Preciado, appointed as Villarreal's new manager on 6 June 2012, died of a heart attack later that day. Following their relegation, there was a mass exodus of players at the club, with star players such as Borja Valero, Diego López, Giuseppe Rossi and Nilmar leaving the side.

After one year in the Segunda División, Villarreal were promoted back to La Liga on the final day of the season after finishing the year second after champions Elche. The team began its new tenure in the top flight by winning its first three games; the winning streak ended with a tie against Real Madrid at El Madrigal, though the team was undefeated until falling to Real Betis 1–0 on the seventh matchday of the season. The Yellow Submarine finished the 2013–14 campaign in sixth, thus qualifying them for next season's Europa League.

In 2014–15, Villarreal again finished the year in sixth, enough to secure direct qualification to the Europa League group stage. In the 2015–16 season, Villarreal led La Liga for the first time during the sixth and seventh weeks, before falling to fifth place the following week. The club ended the season in 4th place and thus advanced to the 2016–17 UEFA Champions League playoff round. The club progressed to the semi-finals of the 2015–16 Europa League, but were knocked out by Liverpool. Villarreal won the first leg 1–0, but lost 3–0 in Liverpool and 3–1 on aggregate.

In 2019–20, Villarreal finished fifth, earning a place in the 2020–21 UEFA Europa League. The team went on a memorable run, advancing to the final after knocking out Arsenal 2–1 on aggregate. Facing favoured Manchester United, Villarreal held them to a 1–1 draw after extra time and then won 11–10 in a penalty shoot-out, winning the club's first ever major trophy. Domestically, they finished seventh, supposedly qualifying for the inaugural UEFA Europa Conference League. However, courtesy of their triumph, Villarreal switched their next year's participation in the inaugural Conference League to the 2021–22 Champions League.

At the start of the 2021–22 season, Villarreal competed in the 2021 UEFA Super Cup against Chelsea in Belfast, which ended a 1–1 draw after extra time, but Chelsea managed to win 6–5 in the penalty shootout as captain Raúl Albiol saw his penalty saved by Chelsea goalkeeper Kepa Arrizabalaga. That same season, Villarreal progressed to the semi-finals of the Champions League after knocking out Juventus in the round of 16 and Bayern Munich in the quarter-finals, before losing 5–2 on aggregate to Liverpool.

== Rivalries ==
Villarreal has supported a long rivalry with Castellón for geographical reasons since both are from the province of Castellón, with players even being threatened for transferring from one club to the other. They also rival Valencia since the two have been the most competitive teams of the Valencian Community; this clash is called the "Derbi de la Comunitat" and has been heightened "since the Submarine won the race against his eternal rival and claimed the role of favourites in each encounter".

== Records ==
- Villarreal's biggest league win at home was by a five-goal margin, achieved on six occasions. The club recorded 5–0 home victories against Salamanca (1998–99 La Liga), Celta Vigo (2002–03 and 2016–17 La Liga), Tenerife (2009–10 La Liga), Levante UD (2021–22 La Liga) and Girona FC (2025–26 La Liga). The most goals Villarreal scored in a league game was six, in a 6–3 home win against Racing Santander during the 2003–04 La Liga season.
- The club's largest away league wins were a 5–1 victory at Las Palmas during the 2000–01 La Liga season, a 4–0 victory at Real Sociedad in the same division during the 2004–05 season, and 4–0 and 5–1 victories at Celta Vigo and Levante, respectively, both during the 2020–21 La Liga season.
- The club's first major trophy was won in 2021 with a penalty shoot-out victory over Manchester United in the Europa League final.

== Club colours ==
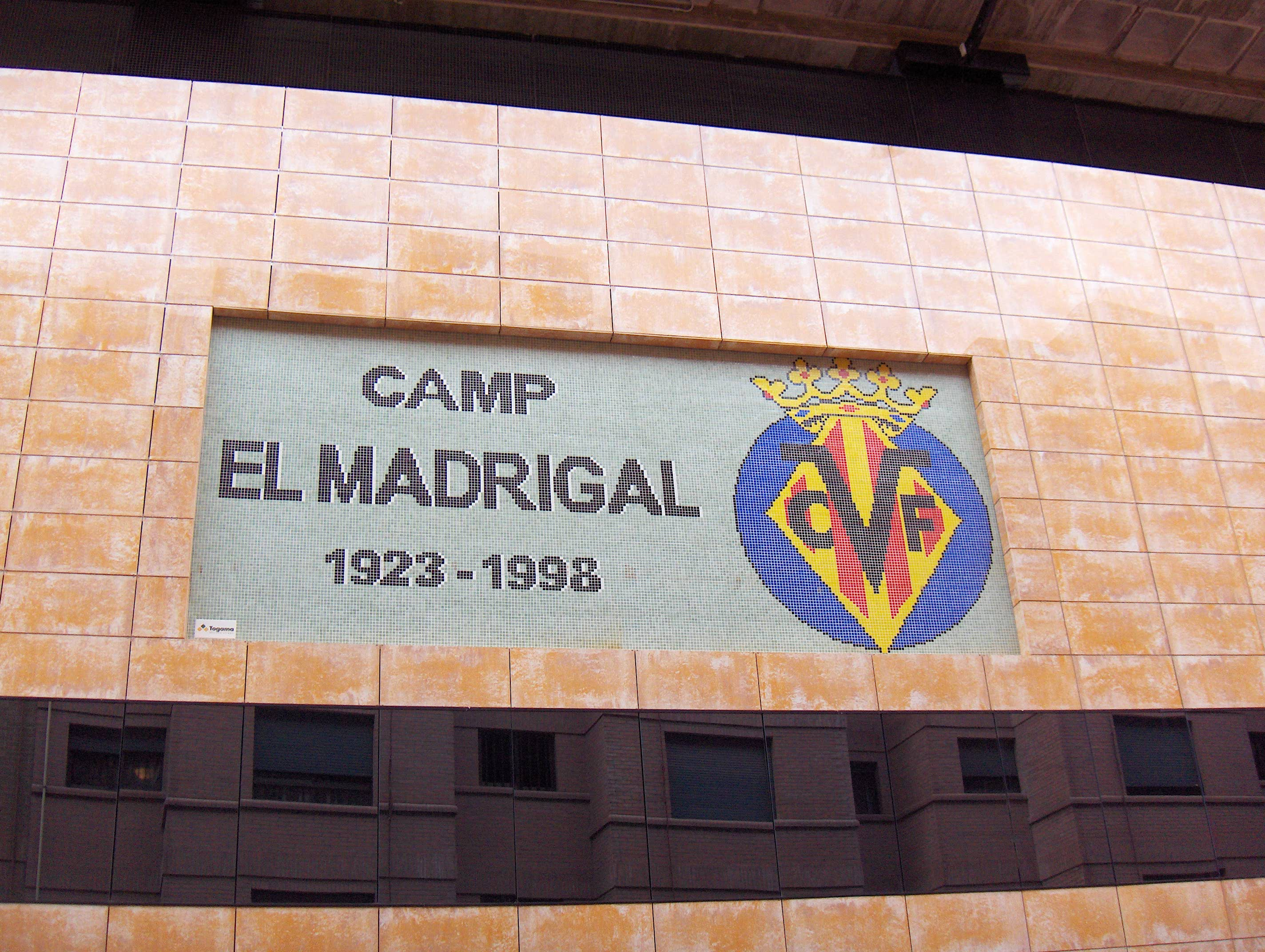
El Madrigal, now renamed Estadio de la Cerámica

The club's famous yellow kit dates back to 1947. With the new season fast approaching, the son of the then Villarreal president travelled to Valencia to purchase replacements of the club's official kit of white shirts and black shorts. Discovering that the shop had neither in stock, he instead bought the only color that they did have, which happened to be yellow. The players agreed that the shirts were suitable, although they weren't keen on the black shorts, so the president's son travelled to Castellón and purchased a batch of white shorts. The players voted that they should be dyed blue. After remaining as the club's official kit for some time, the yellow shirts and blue shorts combination was last worn in the 2002–03 season, and the club has since sported all-yellow kits. Away colours have been navy blue.

From 2005 to 30 June 2011, the shirt sponsor was "Aeroport Castello", an airport. The current shirt sponsor is Pamesa, a ceramics company. From the 2016–17 season, the kit has been made by the Spanish company Joma, having previously been produced by the Chinese company Xtep and Puma of Germany, among others.

== Honours ==
=== Domestic ===
- Tercera División
  - Winners: 1969–70

=== European ===
- UEFA Europa League
  - Winners: 2020–21
- UEFA Intertoto Cup
  - Winners: 2003, 2004

== Season to season ==
| Season | Tier | Division | Place | Copa del Rey |
|---|---|---|---|---|
| 1947–48 | 5 | 2ª Reg. | 6th | |
| 1948–49 | 5 | 2ª Reg. | 4th | |
| 1949–50 | 5 | 2ª Reg. | 1st | |
| 1950–51 | 5 | 2ª Reg. | 1st | |
| 1951–52 | 4 | 1ª Reg. | 7th | |
| 1952–53 | 4 | 1ª Reg. | 4th | |
| 1953–54 | 4 | 1ª Reg. | 2nd | |
| 1954–55 | 4 | 1ª Reg. | 2nd | |
| 1955–56 | 4 | 1ª Reg. | 1st | |
| 1956–57 | 3 | 3ª | 8th | |
| 1957–58 | 3 | 3ª | 5th | |
| 1958–59 | 3 | 3ª | 6th | |
| 1959–60 | 3 | 3ª | 12th | |
| 1960–61 | 3 | 3ª | 14th | |
| 1961–62 | 4 | 1ª Reg. | 14th | |
| 1962–63 | 4 | 1ª Reg. | 15th | |
| 1963–64 | 4 | 1ª Reg. | 6th | |
| 1964–65 | 4 | 1ª Reg. | 3rd | |
| 1965–66 | 4 | 1ª Reg. | 3rd | |
| 1966–67 | 4 | 1ª Reg. | 1st | |

| Season | Tier | Division | Place | Copa del Rey |
|---|---|---|---|---|
| 1967–68 | 3 | 3ª | 3rd | |
| 1968–69 | 3 | 3ª | 9th | |
| 1969–70 | 3 | 3ª | 1st | Third round |
| 1970–71 | 2 | 2ª | 16th | Round of 32 |
| 1971–72 | 2 | 2ª | 17th | Fourth round |
| 1972–73 | 3 | 3ª | 12th | Third round |
| 1973–74 | 3 | 3ª | 12th | Third round |
| 1974–75 | 3 | 3ª | 8th | Third round |
| 1975–76 | 3 | 3ª | 13th | Second round |
| 1976–77 | 4 | Reg. Pref. | 2nd | |
| 1977–78 | 4 | 3ª | 15th | First round |
| 1978–79 | 4 | 3ª | 13th | Second round |
| 1979–80 | 4 | 3ª | 9th | Third round |
| 1980–81 | 4 | 3ª | 16th | First round |
| 1981–82 | 4 | 3ª | 7th | |
| 1982–83 | 4 | 3ª | 14th | |
| 1983–84 | 4 | 3ª | 13th | |
| 1984–85 | 4 | 3ª | 14th | |
| 1985–86 | 4 | 3ª | 6th | |
| 1986–87 | 4 | 3ª | 3rd | Fourth round |

| Season | Tier | Division | Place | Copa del Rey |
|---|---|---|---|---|
| 1987–88 | 3 | 2ª B | 2nd | Second round |
| 1988–89 | 3 | 2ª B | 4th | First round |
| 1989–90 | 3 | 2ª B | 18th | |
| 1990–91 | 4 | 3ª | 2nd | Second round |
| 1991–92 | 3 | 2ª B | 2nd | Second round |
| 1992–93 | 2 | 2ª | 13th | Quarter-finals |
| 1993–94 | 2 | 2ª | 16th | Fifth round |
| 1994–95 | 2 | 2ª | 10th | Fourth round |
| 1995–96 | 2 | 2ª | 15th | First round |
| 1996–97 | 2 | 2ª | 10th | Third round |
| 1997–98 | 2 | 2ª | 4th | First round |
| 1998–99 | 1 | 1ª | 18th | Round of 16 |
| 1999–2000 | 2 | 2ª | 3rd | Round of 16 |
| 2000–01 | 1 | 1ª | 7th | Round of 32 |
| 2001–02 | 1 | 1ª | 15th | Quarter-finals |
| 2002–03 | 1 | 1ª | 15th | First round |
| 2003–04 | 1 | 1ª | 8th | Round of 16 |
| 2004–05 | 1 | 1ª | 3rd | Second round |
| 2005–06 | 1 | 1ª | 7th | Round of 16 |
| 2006–07 | 1 | 1ª | 5th | Round of 16 |

| Season | Tier | Division | Place | Copa del Rey |
|---|---|---|---|---|
| 2007–08 | 1 | 1ª | 2nd | Quarter-finals |
| 2008–09 | 1 | 1ª | 5th | Round of 32 |
| 2009–10 | 1 | 1ª | 7th | Round of 16 |
| 2010–11 | 1 | 1ª | 4th | Quarter-finals |
| 2011–12 | 1 | 1ª | 18th | Round of 32 |
| 2012–13 | 2 | 2ª | 2nd | Second round |
| 2013–14 | 1 | 1ª | 6th | Round of 16 |
| 2014–15 | 1 | 1ª | 6th | Semi-finals |
| 2015–16 | 1 | 1ª | 4th | Round of 16 |
| 2016–17 | 1 | 1ª | 5th | Round of 16 |
| 2017–18 | 1 | 1ª | 5th | Round of 16 |
| 2018–19 | 1 | 1ª | 14th | Round of 16 |
| 2019–20 | 1 | 1ª | 5th | Quarter-finals |
| 2020–21 | 1 | 1ª | 7th | Quarter-finals |
| 2021–22 | 1 | 1ª | 7th | Round of 32 |
| 2022–23 | 1 | 1ª | 5th | Round of 16 |
| 2023–24 | 1 | 1ª | 8th | Round of 32 |
| 2024–25 | 1 | 1ª | 5th | Second round |
| 2025–26 | 1 | 1ª | 3rd | Round of 32 |
| 2026–27 | 1 | 1ª | | TBD |

- 27 seasons in La Liga
- 10 seasons in Segunda División
- 4 seasons in Segunda División B
- 23 seasons in Tercera División

== In Europe ==
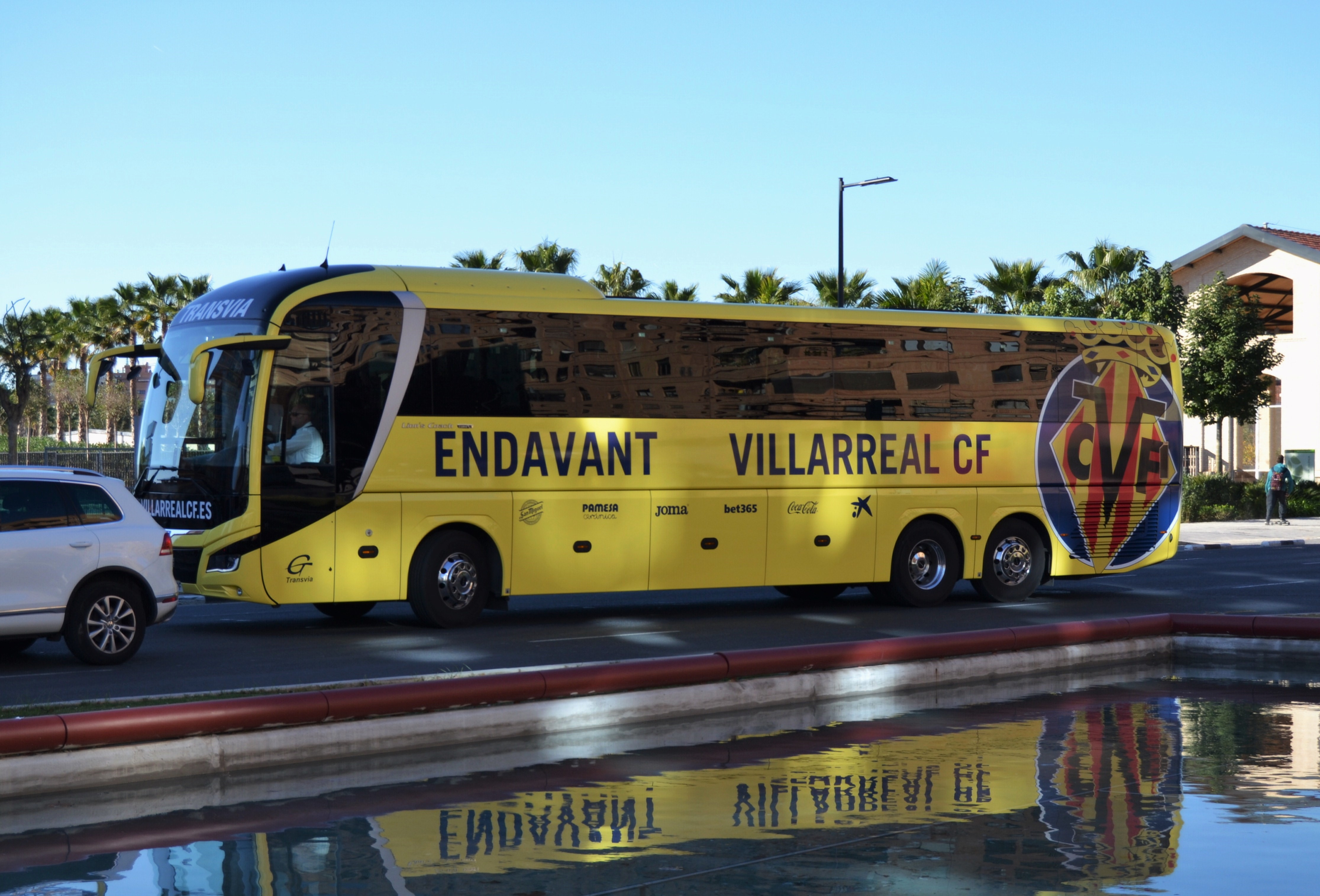
The team bus

Accurate as of 10 December 2025

| Competition | Pld | W | D | L | GF | GA | GD | W% |
|---|---|---|---|---|---|---|---|---|
| UEFA Champions League | 52 | 14 | 16 | 22 | 55 | 69 | −14 | 26.92 |
| UEFA Cup / UEFA Europa League | 134 | 77 | 31 | 26 | 237 | 137 | +100 | 57.46 |
| UEFA Europa Conference League | 10 | 6 | 2 | 2 | 21 | 13 | +8 | 60.00 |
| UEFA Intertoto Cup | 24 | 12 | 8 | 4 | 32 | 16 | +16 | 50.00 |
| UEFA Super Cup | 1 | 0 | 1 | 0 | 1 | 1 | +0 | 0.00 |
| Total | 221 | 109 | 58 | 54 | 346 | 236 | +110 | 49.32 |

=== UEFA club coefficient ranking ===
As of 31 May 2025

| Rank | Team | Points |
|---|---|---|
| 15 | (Portugal) Benfica | 87.750 |
| 16 | (Italy) Atalanta | 82.000 |
| 17 | (Spain) Villarreal | 82.000 |
| 18 | (Portugal) Porto | 79.750 |
| 19 | (Italy) Milan | 78.000 |

== Nickname and mascot ==
The team is nicknamed El Submarino Amarillo (the Yellow Submarine) because of their yellow strip. The mascot (named Groguet, "Little Yellow") is characterised as an anthropomorphic submarine. He made his debut on 26 October 2001 and was named on 13 December that year by a local 12-year-old, Javier Fuster Almela, following a province-wide competition open to under-15s.

== Players ==
=== Current squad ===
As of 1 September 2026

Note: Flags indicate national team as defined under FIFA eligibility rules; some limited exceptions apply. Players may hold more than one non-FIFA nationality.

| No. | Pos. | Nation | Player |
|---|---|---|---|
| 1 | GK | BRA | Luiz Júnior |
| 2 | DF | CPV | Logan Costa |
| 3 | DF | USA | Alex Freeman |
| 5 | MF | SEN | Alassane Diatta |
| 6 | DF | ESP | Pau Navarro |
| 7 | FW | ESP | Gerard Moreno (captain) |
| 8 | DF | ARG | Juan Foyth (3rd captain) |
| 9 | FW | GEO | Georges Mikautadze |
| 10 | MF | ESP | Alberto Moleiro |
| 11 | FW | MAR | Ilias Akhomach |
| 12 | DF | POR | Renato Veiga |
| 13 | GK | ESP | Rubén Gómez |

| No. | Pos. | Nation | Player |
|---|---|---|---|
| 14 | MF | ESP | Santi Comesaña (vice-captain) |
| 15 | DF | URU | Santiago Mouriño |
| 16 | MF | ESP | Carlos Maciá |
| 17 | MF | CAN | Tajon Buchanan |
| 18 | MF | SEN | Pape Gueye |
| 19 | FW | CIV | Nicolas Pépé |
| 20 | DF | ESP | Carlos Romero |
| 21 | FW | CAN | Tani Oluwaseyi |
| 22 | FW | ESP | Ayoze Pérez |
| 23 | DF | ESP | Sergi Cardona (4th captain) |
| 24 | MF | CAN | Nathan Saliba |
| 25 | GK | HUN | Péter Gulácsi |

=== Reserve team ===
Note: Flags indicate national team as defined under FIFA eligibility rules; some limited exceptions apply. Players may hold more than one non-FIFA nationality.

| No. | Pos. | Nation | Player |
|---|---|---|---|
| 27 | FW | ESP | Nizar El Jmili |
| 28 | FW | ESP | Joselillo Gaitán |
| 30 | MF | SEN | Cheikh Thiam |

| No. | Pos. | Nation | Player |
|---|---|---|---|
| 32 | MF | ESP | César Bonafé |
| 37 | FW | ESP | Mauro Roca |
| 38 | FW | ESP | Sergio Barrera |

=== Out on loan ===
Note: Flags indicate national team as defined under FIFA eligibility rules; some limited exceptions apply. Players may hold more than one non-FIFA nationality.

| No. | Pos. | Nation | Player |
|---|---|---|---|
| — | GK | ESP | Arnau Tenas (at Mallorca until 30 June 2027) |
| — | GK | ESP | Diego Conde (at Real Betis until 30 June 2027) |
| — | DF | ESP | Dani Budesca (at Córdoba until 30 June 2027) |
| — | DF | CIV | Jean Ives Valou (at Getafe until 30 June 2027) |

| No. | Pos. | Nation | Player |
|---|---|---|---|
| — | DF | COD | Willy Kambwala (at Como until 30 June 2027) |
| — | MF | ESP | Dani Requena (at Levante until 30 June 2027) |
| — | FW | ARG | Thiago Fernández (at Levante until 30 June 2027) |
| — | FW | ESP | Hugo López (at Andorra until 30 June 2027) |

== Player records ==
=== Most appearances ===
Competitive, professional matches only. Bold indicates player is still active at club level.

As of 17 May 2026.

| Rank | Player | Apps | League apps | Period | Nationality |
|---|---|---|---|---|---|
| 1 | Manu Trigueros | **477** | **366** | 2012–2024 | Spain |
| 2 | Bruno Soriano | 425 | 324 | 2006–2020 | Spain |
| 3 | Mario Gaspar | 424 | 337 | 2009–2022 | Spain |
| 4 | Marcos Senna | 363 | 292 | 2002–2013 | Spain |
| 5 | Santi Cazorla | 334 | 251 | 2003–2006; 2007–2011; 2018–2020 | Spain |
| 6 | Cani | 327 | 259 | 2006–2014 | Spain |
| 7 | **Gerard Moreno** | 321 | 250 | 2012–2013; 2014–2015; 2018–present | Spain |
| 8 | Rodolfo Arruabarrena | 284 | 219 | 2000–2007 | Argentina |
| 9 | Pascual Donat | 267 | 237 | 1992–2000 | Spain |
| 10 | Jaume Costa | 267 | 211 | 2012–2019; 2020–2021 | Spain |

=== Goalscorers ===
Competitive, professional matches only. Bold indicates player is still active at club level.

As of 13 May 2026.

| Rank | Player | Goals | League goals | Period | Nationality |
|---|---|---|---|---|---|
| 1 | **Gerard Moreno** | **130** | **98** | 2012–2013; 2014–2015; 2018–present | Spain |
| 2 | Adriano García | 106 | **98** | 1986; 1988–1991; 1991–1993 | Spain |
| 3 | Giuseppe Rossi | 82 | 54 | 2007–2013 | Italy |
| 4 | José Forment | 72 | 65 | 1974–1979 | Spain |
| 5 | Diego Herrero | 62 | 55 | 1971–1973; 1974–1977; 1980–1981 | Spain |
| 6 | Diego Forlán | 59 | 54 | 2004–2007 | Uruguay |
| 7 | Santi Cazorla | 57 | 40 | 2003–2006; 2007–2011; 2018–2020 | Spain |
| 8 | Cédric Bakambu | 48 | 32 | 2015–2018 | Democratic Republic of the Congo |
| 9 | Juan Román Riquelme | 45 | 36 | 2003–2007 | Argentina |
| 10 | Víctor | 44 | 39 | 2000–2004 | Spain |

== Current technical staff ==
| Position | Staff |
|---|---|
| Head coach | (Spain) Iñigo Pérez |
| Assistant head coach | (Spain) Adrián López |
| Fitness coach | (Spain) Javier Mallo |
| Assistant fitness coach | (Spain) Fernando Martínez |
| Technical assistant | (Spain) Óscar Díaz (Spain) Diego Bermúdez |
| Analyst | (Spain) Pepe Alcaide (Spain) Pier Luis |
| Goalkeeping coach | (Spain) Xavier Valero |
| Assistant goalkeeping coach | (Spain) Joel Garzón |
| Delegate | (Spain) Xisco Nadal |
| Director of medical services | (Spain) Héctor Usó |
| Doctor / Medical Services | (Spain) Enrique Soriano |
| Nurse / Medical Services | (Spain) Sergio Broceño |
| Physiotherapist | (Spain) Josep Rochera (Spain) Axel Tirado (Spain) Nacho Fornás (Spain) Ferran Romero (Spain) Diego Manero |
| Rehab fitness coach | (Spain) José Luis Villarroya (Spain) Adrián Beltrán (Spain) Adrián Sabater |
| Massage therapist | (Spain) Juan Hernández |
| Equipment manager | (Spain) Adrián Ortells (Spain) Jorge Garrido |

Last updated: 5 August 2026
Source: Villarreal CF

== Coaches ==
- (Peru) Osman Bendezu (1 July 1992 – 15 March 1993)
- (Spain) Carlos Simón Server (18 March 1993 – 26 February 1995)
- (Spain) Fidel Uriarte (27 February 1995 – 29 October 1995)
- (Spain) David Vidal (5 November 1995 – 30 June 1996)
- (Spain) Javier Subirats (1 July 1996 – 27 January 1997)
- (Spain) José Antonio Irulegui (2 February 1997 – 31 May 1999)
- (Spain) Paquito (1 June 1999 – 30 June 1999)
- (Spain) Joaquín Caparrós (1 July 1999 – 4 October 1999)
- (Spain) Paquito (5 October 1999 – 30 June 2000)
- (Spain) Víctor Muñoz (1 July 2000 – 11 September 2002)
- (Spain) Benito Floro (17 September 2002 – 23 February 2004)
- (Spain) Paquito (24 February 2004 – 30 June 2004)
- (Chile) Manuel Pellegrini (1 July 2004 – 30 June 2009)
- (Spain) Ernesto Valverde (1 July 2009 – 31 January 2010)
- (Spain) Juan Carlos Garrido (1 February 2010 – 21 December 2011)
- (Spain) José Francisco Molina (22 December 2011 – 18 March 2012)
- (Spain) Miguel Ángel Lotina (19 March 2012 – 1 June 2012)
- (Spain) Julio Velázquez (1 July 2012 – 13 January 2013)
- (Spain) Marcelino (15 January 2013 – 10 August 2016)
- (Spain) Fran Escribá (11 August 2016 – 25 September 2017)
- (Spain) Javier Calleja (25 September 2017 – 10 December 2018)
- (Spain) Luis García (10 December 2018 – 29 January 2019)
- (Spain) Javier Calleja (29 January 2019 – 20 July 2020)
- (Spain) Unai Emery (23 July 2020 – 24 October 2022)
- (Spain) Quique Setién (25 October 2022 – 5 September 2023)
- (Spain) Pacheta (9 September 2023 – 10 November 2023)
- (Spain) Marcelino (13 November 2023 – 31 May 2026)
- (Spain) Iñigo Pérez (1 June 2026 – Present)

== See also ==
- Villarreal CF B – Second team currently in the Primera Federación
- Villarreal CF C – Third team currently in the Tercera Federación
- List of Villarreal CF players
