= CD Roda =

Spanish association football club

Roda
- Full name: Club Deportivo Roda
- Nickname: Los gualdinegros
- Founded: 1974
- Ground: Ciutat Esportiva Pamesa Ceràmica, Villarreal, Valencian Community, Spain
- Capacity: 250
- President: Jorge Roda
- Head coach: Miguel Ángel Muñoz
- League: Tercera Federación – Group 6
- 2025–26: Tercera Federación – Group 6, 12th of 18
- Website: www.cdroda.com
Home colours	Away colours

Club Deportivo Roda is a Spanish football team based in Villarreal, in the autonomous community of Valencian Community. Founded in 1974, it plays in Tercera Federación – Group 6, holding home matches at Ciutat Esportiva Pamesa Ceràmica.

Initially dedicated exclusively to youth football, Roda established a senior team in 1999. In 2006 the club signed a collaboration agreement with Villarreal CF, sharing their youth setups and helping in the development of players.

== History ==
Logo used until 2022

José Roda, CD Roda founder, wanted his children to play sports. That is why in 1974 he decided to found his own football club, named after his family name.

Over the following decades, the club grew into one of the most respected football academies in the Valencian Community. Its philosophy emphasized player education, discipline, teamwork, and respect for the game. For years, it was known primarily for its youth categories, competing across regional and national tournaments.

In 1999, the club created its first senior team, entering the regional leagues of Castellón. This allowed CD Roda to retain its homegrown players and offer them a natural progression from academy to adult football.

The most significant turning point came in 2006, when CD Roda signed a formal partnership with Villarreal CF, one of Spain’s most successful football clubs. The agreement enabled Roda to use Villarreal’s training facilities, including the newly built Ciutat Esportiva Pamesa Ceràmica, and to integrate its youth programs with Villarreal’s academy structure. Since then, the club has become an essential part of Villarreal’s development network, producing players who have later joined professional clubs in Spain and abroad.

In recent years, CD Roda has maintained consistent performances in the Tercera Federación, consolidating its position among the best amateur teams in the Valencian Community. In the 2024–25 season, the club achieved its best-ever result, finishing **2nd in Group 6 of the Tercera Federación**, only a few points short of promotion to the Segunda Federación.

== Stadium ==
CD Roda plays its home games at the Ciutat Esportiva Pamesa Ceràmica, located in Villarreal. The sports complex was inaugurated in 2015 and forms part of the Villarreal CF Training Ground network. The facility includes multiple natural and artificial grass pitches, gymnasiums, classrooms, and rehabilitation areas.

The ground used by CD Roda has a capacity of around **250 spectators**, and its dimensions and surface meet the official requirements for national competition. The stadium provides a modern environment for both professional training and competitive matches, serving as one of the main hubs for youth and semi-professional football in Castellón province.

== Youth and development ==
The club currently runs more than **30 teams** across all categories, from under-7 to senior level. Its youth academy is considered one of the most productive in eastern Spain, with several graduates moving on to Villarreal CF and other professional clubs.

Through its partnership with Villarreal CF, CD Roda contributes directly to the scouting and formation of promising players. The club emphasizes education and personal growth, balancing athletic goals with academic responsibilities, a philosophy inspired by the Villarreal CF model.

== Community and identity ==
CD Roda maintains a strong link with the city of Villarreal and its surrounding towns. The club regularly participates in local sports events, school programs, and charity activities promoting inclusion and youth sport.

The traditional club colors are **yellow and black**, symbolizing energy and determination, and are reflected in its home kit. The away kit is white with red accents.

== Season to season ==
Season	Tier	Division	Place	Copa del Rey
1999–2000	7	2ª Reg.	3rd	
2000–01	7	2ª Reg.	2nd	
2001–02	6	1ª Reg.	9th	
2002–03	6	1ª Reg.	14th	
2003–04	7	2ª Reg.	6th	
2004–05	7	2ª Reg.	4th	
2005–06	DNP			
2006–07	7	2ª Reg.	15th	
2007–08	7	2ª Reg.	6th	
2008–09	7	2ª Reg.	10th	
2009–10	7	2ª Reg.	8th	
2010–11	7	2ª Reg.	4th	
2011–12	7	2ª Reg.	2nd	
2012–13	7	2ª Reg.	4th	
2013–14	7	2ª Reg.	3rd	
2014–15	7	2ª Reg.	2nd	
2015–16	6	1ª Reg.	1st	
2016–17	5	Reg. Pref.	2nd	
2017–18	4	3ª	11th	
2018–19	4	3ª	8th	

Season	Tier	Division	Place	Copa del Rey
2019–20	4	3ª	12th	
2020–21	4	3ª	5th	
2021–22	5	3ª RFEF	7th	
2022–23	5	3ª Fed.	5th	
2023–24	5	3ª Fed.	9th	
2024–25	5	3ª Fed.	2nd	
2025–26	5	3ª Fed.	12th	First round
2026–27	5	3ª Fed.		

- 4 seasons in Tercera División
- 6 seasons in Tercera Federación/Tercera División RFEF
