= 2024–25 Rayo Vallecano season =

Rayo Vallecano
2024–25 season
- President: Raúl Martín Presa
- Head coach: Iñigo Pérez
- Stadium: Vallecas
- La Liga: 8th
- Copa del Rey: Round of 16
- Top goalscorer: League: Jorge de Frutos (6); All: Jorge de Frutos (8)
- Highest home attendance: 14,168
- Average home league attendance: 12,908
Home colours	Away colours	Third colours

The 2024–25 season was the 101st season in the history of Rayo Vallecano, and the club's fourth consecutive season in La Liga. In addition to the domestic league, the club participated in the Copa del Rey.

Rayo Vallecano concluded the La Liga season in eighth place, marking their best league finish since the 2012–13 campaign, when they also secured the same position. This achievement qualified the club for a spot in the UEFA Conference League, signaling their return to European competition after a 24-year absence.

== Transfers ==
=== In ===
Pos.	Player	Transferred from	Fee	Date	Source
DF	(Spain) Pelayo Fernández	(Spain) Barcelona Atlètic	Free	2 July 2024	
MF	(Spain) Gerard Gumbau	(Spain) Granada	Loan	16 July 2024	
MF	(Spain) Adri Embarba	(Spain) Almería	Loan	26 July 2024	
MF	(Colombia) James Rodríguez	Unattached	Free	26 August 2024	
FW	(Spain) Sergi Guardiola	Unattached	Free	4 September 2024	

=== Out ===
Pos.	Player	Transferred to	Fee	Date	Source
MF	(Portugal) Miguel Crespo	(Turkey) Fenerbahçe	Loan return	30 June 2024	
MF	(Spain) Kike Pérez	(Spain) Real Valladolid	Loan return	30 June 2024	
FW	(Colombia) Radamel Falcao	(Colombia) Millonarios	End of contract	1 July 2024	
MF	(Spain) José Ángel Pozo	(Cyprus) Karmiotissa FC	End of contract	1 July 2024	
FW	(Cape Verde) Bebé	(Spain) Racing de Ferrol	Contract terminated	30 August 2024	
MF	(Colombia) James Rodríguez		Contract terminated	6 January 2025	

== Friendlies ==
=== Pre-season ===
18 July 2024 Friendly	Braga	2–2	Rayo Vallecano	Portugal
20:15 UTC+1	Martínez 24'; Horta 43'		Fernández 13'; De las Sías 88'

20 July 2024 Friendly	Vitória de Guimarães	2–0	Rayo Vallecano	Portugal
19:30 UTC+1	Jota 54'; Marco Cruz 68'

26 July 2024 Friendly	SC Heerenveen	5–0	Rayo Vallecano	Heerenveen, Netherlands
19:00 UTC+2				Stadium: Abe Lenstra Stadion

31 July 2024 Friendly	Córdoba CF	1–1	Rayo Vallecano
21:00 UTC+2

31 July 2024 Trofeo Puertas de Córdoba	Córdoba	1–1 (4–2 p)	Rayo Vallecano	Córdoba
21:00				Stadium: Estadio Nuevo Arcángel

4 August 2024 Friendly	AFC Bournemouth	1–0	Rayo Vallecano	Bournemouth, England
15:00	Sinisterra 32'			Stadium: Dean Court

== Competitions ==
=== Overall record ===
Competition	First match	Last match	Starting round	Final position	Record							
Competition	First match	Last match	Starting round	Final position	Pld	W	D	L	GF	GA	GD	Win %
La Liga	18 August 2024	24 May 2025	Matchday 1	8th	38	13	13	12	41	45	−4	34.21
Copa del Rey	29 October 2024	16 January 2025	First round	Round of 16	4	3	0	1	12	6	+6	75.00
Total					42	16	13	13	53	51	+2	38.10

Source: Soccerway

=== La Liga ===
==== League table ====
Pos	Team	Pld	W	D	L	GF	GA	GD	Pts	Qualification or relegation
6	Real Betis	38	16	12	10	57	50	+7	60	Qualification for the Europa League league stage (Note: The 2024–25 Copa del Rey winner qualified for the Europa League league stage. Since the cup winners (Barcelona) qualified based on league position, the Europa League spot was passed to the seventh-placed team, and the Conference League spot was passed to the eighth-placed team.)
7	Celta Vigo	38	16	7	15	59	57	+2	55	Qualification for the Europa League league stage
8	Rayo Vallecano	38	13	13	12	41	45	−4	52 (Note: Rayo Vallecano finished ahead of Osasuna on head-to-head points: Rayo Vallecano 3–1 Osasuna, Osasuna 1–1 Rayo Vallecano.)	Qualification for the Conference League play-off round
9	Osasuna	38	12	16	10	48	52	−4	52	
10	Mallorca	38	13	9	16	35	44	−9	48	

Source: LaLiga EA Sports
Rules for classification: 1) Points; 2) Head-to-head points; 3) Head-to-head goal difference; 4) Goal difference; 5) Goals scored; 6) Fair-play points
(Note: Head-to-head record is used only after all the matches between the teams in question have been played)

==== Results summary ====
Overall								Home						Away					
Pld	W	D	L	GF	GA	GD	Pts	W	D	L	GF	GA	GD	W	D	L	GF	GA	GD
38	13	13	12	41	45	−4	52	6	8	5	24	26	−2	7	5	7	17	19	−2

==== Results by round ====
Round	1	2	3	4	5	6	7	8	9	10	11	13^{1}	14	15	16	17	12	18	19	20	21	22	23	24	25	26	27	28	29	30	31	32	33	34
Ground	A	A	H	A	H	H	A	H	A	A	H	H	A	H	A	H	A	A	H	A	H	A	H	A	H	H	A	H	A	H	A	H	A	H
Result	W	D	L	L	W	D	D	D	W	L	W	L	L	L	W	D	D	D	W	D	W	W	W	L	L	D	L	D	W	L	L	D	L	W
Position	3	8	9	12	7	9	9	9	8	9	9	12	13	13	12	12	12	12	9	9	7	6	6	6	6	7	8	9	7	8	10	10	12	9

Updated to match(es) played on 24 April 2024. Source:
A = Away; H = Home; W = Win; D = Draw; L = Loss

==== Matches ====
The league schedule was released on 18 June 2024.

18 August 2024 1	Real Sociedad	1–2	Rayo Vallecano	San Sebastián
19:00 CEST (UTC+2)	González de Zárate (yellow card) 27'; Aramburu (yellow card) 90+4'; Zubimendi 90+8'	Report	López (yellow card) 32'; Lejeune (yellow card) 53'; Nteka (yellow card) 56'; Embarba (yellow card) 57'; De Frutos 67'; Camello 84'	Stadium: Reale Arena; Attendance: 31,763; Referee: Alejandro Hernández Hernández

24 August 2024 2	Getafe	0–0	Rayo Vallecano	Getafe
21:30 CEST (UTC+2)	Uche (yellow card) 41'	Report	Ciss (yellow card) 54'; Espino (yellow card) 82'	Stadium: Coliseum; Attendance: 9,529; Referee: Javier Alberola Rojas

27 August 2024 3	Rayo Vallecano	1–2	Barcelona	Madrid
21:30 CEST (UTC+2)	López 9'; Palazón (yellow card) 45+2'; Mumin (yellow card) 71'; Ciss (yellow card) 88'	Report	Pedri 60'; Olmo 82'; Bernal (yellow card) 90+4'	Stadium: Campo de Fútbol de Vallecas; Attendance: 14,031; Referee: César Soto Grado

31 August 2024 4	Espanyol	2–1	Rayo Vallecano	Cornellà de Llobregat
19:15 CEST (UTC+2)	Romero 8'; Kumbulla (yellow card) 81'; Aguado (yellow card) 85'; Véliz 90+6', (yellow card) 90+7'	Report	García 4', (yellow card) 82'; Mumin (yellow card) 90+3'	Stadium: Stage Front Stadium; Attendance: 22,405; Referee: Adrián Cordero Vega

16 September 2024 5	Rayo Vallecano	3–1	Osasuna	Madrid
21:00 CEST (UTC+2)	Mumin 50', (yellow card) 78'; Camello (yellow card) 59'; Rațiu 66'; López (yellow card) 88', (goal) 90+5'	Report	Zaragoza (yellow card) 19'; García 27'; Moncayola (yellow card) 42'	Stadium: Campo de Fútbol de Vallecas; Attendance: 13,073; Referee: Alejandro Quintero González

22 September 2024 6	Rayo Vallecano	1–1	Atlético Madrid	Madrid
21:00 CEST (UTC+2)	Palazón 35'	Report	Gallagher 49'	Stadium: Campo de Fútbol de Vallecas; Attendance: 13,646; Referee: Mario Melero López

25 September 2024 7	Girona	0–0	Rayo Vallecano	Girona
19:00 CEST (UTC+2)	Tsyhankov (yellow card) 20'; Ruiz (yellow card) 58'; Herrera (yellow card) 83'	Report	Díaz (yellow card) 45'; López (yellow card) 64'; Balliu (yellow card) 89'; Rațiu (yellow card) 90+3'	Stadium: Montilivi; Attendance: 12,272; Referee: Juan Martínez Munuera

28 September 2024 8	Rayo Vallecano	1–1	Leganés	Madrid
16:15 CEST (UTC+2)	Camello 8'; Rodríguez (yellow card) 57'; Embarba (yellow card) 90+4'	Report	Tapia (yellow card) 27'; Cruz 55'	Stadium: Vallecas Stadium; Attendance: 13,186; Referee: Alejandro Muñiz Ruiz

5 October 2024 9	Valladolid	1–2	Rayo Vallecano	Valladolid
18:30 CEST (UTC+2)	Cömert (yellow card) 20'; Latasa (yellow card) 32'; Rosa (yellow card) 49'; Amallah 51'; Torres (yellow card) 62'	Report	de Frutos 57', 80'; López (yellow card) 82'; Balliu (yellow card) 90+6'	Stadium: Estadio José Zorrilla; Attendance: 21,112; Referee: Pablo González Fuertes

20 October 2024 10	Mallorca	1–0	Rayo Vallecano	Palma
14:00 CEST (UTC+2)	Morlanes (yellow card) 38'; Muriqi 75'	Report	Mumin (yellow card) 37'	Stadium: Estadi Mallorca Son Moix; Attendance: 18,316; Referee: Javier Alberola Rojas

26 October 2024 11	Rayo Vallecano	1–0	Alavés	Madrid
16:15 CEST (UTC+2)	Mumin (red card) 22'; López (yellow card) 49'; Sivera 80' (o.g.); Chavarría (yellow card) 90+3'	Report	Sánchez (yellow card) 50'; Diarra (yellow card) 67'; Guridi (yellow card) 77'; Jordán (yellow card) 88'	Stadium: Vallecas Stadium; Attendance: 13,010; Referee: Adrián Cordero Vega

8 November 2024 13	Rayo Vallecano	1–3	Las Palmas	Madrid
21:00 CET (UTC+1)	Gumbau (yellow card) 34'; McKenna 90+2' (o.g.)	Report	Silva 6'; McKenna (yellow card) 10'; Muñoz (yellow card) 45+2'; Essugo (yellow card) 49'; Aridane 62' (o.g.); Fuster 67'	Stadium: Vallecas Stadium; Attendance: 12,978; Referee: Francisco José Hernández Maeso

24 November 2024 14	Sevilla	1–0	Rayo Vallecano	Seville
16:15 CET (UTC+1)	Sow 28'; Badé (yellow card) 40'; Salas (yellow card) 46'	Report	de Frutos (yellow card) 9'; Lejeune (yellow card) 20'; Valentín (yellow card) 31'; García (yellow card) 37'; López (red card) 45+1'; Batalla (yellow card) 90+2'	Stadium: Ramón Sánchez Pizjuán Stadium; Attendance: 35,125; Referee: Mateo Busquets Ferrer

1 December 2024 15	Rayo Vallecano	1–2	Athletic Bilbao	Madrid
18:30 CET (UTC+1)	Nteka 14'; Ciss (yellow card) 69'; Gumbau (yellow card) 76'; García (yellow card) 90+5'	Report	Sancet 65', 78'	Stadium: Vallecas; Attendance: 13,639; Referee: Mario Melero López

7 December 2024 16	Valencia	0–1	Rayo Vallecano	Valencia
18:30 CET (UTC+1)	Mamardashvili (yellow card) 52'; Gąsiorowski (yellow card) 72'	Report	Ciss 7'; Nteka (yellow card) 52'; Palazón (yellow card) 71'	Stadium: Ramón Sánchez Pizjuán Stadium; Attendance: 40,968; Referee: José Luis Munuera Montero

14 December 2024 17	Rayo Vallecano	3–3	Real Madrid	Madrid
21:00 UTC+1	López 4'; Batalla (yellow card) 27'; Nteka (yellow card) 34'; Mumin 36'; Palazón (yellow card) 44', (goal) 64'; Camello (yellow card) 90+2'	Report	Valverde 39'; Bellingham 45'; Rodrygo 56'; Modrić (yellow card) 62'; Vinícius Júnior (yellow card) 74'	Stadium: Vallecas; Attendance: 14,168; Referee: Juan Martínez Munuera

18 December 2024 12	Villarreal	1–1	Rayo Vallecano	Villarreal
21:30 CEST (UTC+2)	Pino (yellow card) 27'; Kambwala (red card) 32'; Ayoze 45+1'; Gueye (yellow card) 54'; Ojeda (yellow card) 85'; Logan Costa (yellow card) 90+5'	Report	Álvaro 20'; Mumin (yellow card) 45+5'; Lejeune (yellow card) 46'; Trejo (yellow card) 53'	Stadium: Estadio de la Cerámica; Attendance: 14.000; Referee: Alejandro José Hernández Hernández

22 December 2024 18	Real Betis	1–1	Rayo Vallecano	Seville
21:00 CET (UTC+1)	Isco 37' (pen.)	Report	Ciss (yellow card) 27'; García (yellow card) 36'; Palazón 51', (yellow card) 81'; Espino (yellow card) 90+4'	Stadium: Benito Villamarín; Attendance: 53,121; Referee: Víctor García Verdura

10 January 2025 19	Rayo Vallecano	2–1	Celta Vigo	Madrid
21:00 CET (UTC+1)	Embarba 5'; Ciss (yellow card) 21'; Mumin (yellow card) 27'; De Frutos 63'	Report	Iglesias 26'; Alonso (yellow card) 37' (yellow-red card) 90+4'; Cervi (yellow card) 43'	Stadium: Vallecas; Attendance: 12,955; Referee: Guillermo Cuadra Fernández

19 January 2025 20	Osasuna	1–1	Rayo Vallecano	Pamplona
18:30 CET (UTC+1)	Ibáñez (yellow card) 40'; García 59'; Moncayola (yellow card) 72'; Areso (yellow card) 81'	Report	Camello 19'; Valentín (yellow card) 38'; Batalla (yellow card) 84'	Stadium: El Sadar; Attendance: 20,770; Referee: Alejandro Muñiz Ruiz

26 January 2025 21	Rayo Vallecano	2–1	Girona	Madrid
14:00 CEST (UTC+2)	Unai López (yellow card) 21'; Nteka 80', 83', (yellow card) 90+2'; Lejeune (yellow card) 90+7'	Report	Gil 58'; Herrera (yellow card) 70'	Stadium: Vallecas; Attendance: 12.405; Referee: Isidro Díaz de Mera Escuderos

31 January 2025 22	Leganés	0–1	Rayo Vallecano	Leganés
21:00 CEST (UTC+2)	Raba (yellow card) 34'; S.González (red card) 45+2'; Neyou (yellow card) 63'; Borja Jiménez (yellow card) 90+11'; Miguel (penalty missed) 90+15	Report	Nteka (yellow card) 53'; Rațiu (yellow card) 55'; Unai López (yellow card) 75'; Pathé Ciss 78'; Embarba (yellow card) 89'	Stadium: Municipal de Butarque; Attendance: 11.432; Referee: Alejandro Quintero González

7 February 2025 23	Rayo Vallecano	1–0	Real Valladolid	Madrid
21:00 CEST (UTC+2)	Pathé Ciss (yellow card) 13'; Frutos (yellow card) 56'; Álvaro 71'	Report	André (yellow card) 29'; Aznou (yellow card) 69'	Stadium: Vallecas; Attendance: 12.286; Referee: Jesús Gil Manzano

17 February 2025 24	Barcelona	1–0	Rayo Vallecano	Barcelona
21:00 CEST (UTC+2)	Lewandowski 28' (pen.); Gavi (yellow card) 45+2'; Torres (yellow card) 90+5'	Report	Pathé Ciss (yellow card) 27'; Rațiu (yellow card) 41'; Embarba (yellow card) 87'	Stadium: Estadi Olímpic Lluís Companys; Attendance: 45.296; Referee: Mario Melero López

22 February 2025 25	Rayo Vallecano	0–1	Villarreal	Madrid
16:15 CEST (UTC+2)	Frutos (red card) 42'; Rațiu (yellow card) 78'	Report	Barry (yellow card) 44'; Pino (yellow card) 55'; Ayoze 66'; Conde (yellow card) 90+1'; Parejo (yellow card) 90+5'	Stadium: Vallecas; Attendance: 13.373; Referee: Víctor García Verdura

1 March 2025 26	Rayo Vallecano	1–1	Sevilla	Madrid
16:15 CEST (UTC+2)	Rațiu 55'; Gumbau (yellow card) 87'	Report	Lukebakio 81'	Stadium: Vallecas; Attendance: 11.947; Referee: Pablo González Fuertes

9 March 2025 27	Real Madrid	2–1	Rayo Vallecano	Madrid
16:15 CEST (UTC+2)	Mbappé 30'; Vinícius Junior 34', (yellow card) 79'; Tchouaméni (yellow card) 85'; Modrić (yellow card) 90+2'	Report	Pedro Díaz 45+2'; Gumbau (yellow card) 63'	Stadium: Estadio Santiago Bernabéu; Attendance: 74.170; Referee: Francisco José Hernández Maeso

16 March 2025 28	Rayo Vallecano	2–2	Real Sociedad	Madrid
18:30 CEST (UTC+2)	Guardiola (yellow card) 40'; Trejo 58'; Díaz 72'; Lejeune (yellow card) 74'; Espino (yellow card) 90+2'	Report	López (yellow card) 11'; Zubimendi 20'; Barrenetxea (yellow card) 60'; Mariezkurrena 80'	Stadium: Vallecas; Attendance: 12,364; Referee: Alejandro Muñiz Ruiz

29 March 2025 29	Alavés	0–2	Rayo Vallecano	Vitoria-Gasteiz
18:30	Jordán (penalty missed) 14'; Cabanes (yellow card) 16'; Mouriño (yellow card) 77'; Tenaglia (yellow card) 80'	Report	Pathé Ciss 2'; Pelayo (yellow card) 8'; Nteka (yellow card) 36'; Díaz 58'; Batalla (yellow card) 62'; Aridane (yellow card) 78'	Stadium: Mendizorrotza; Attendance: 18.336; Referee: José Munuera Montero

4 April 2025 30	Rayo Vallecano	0–4	Espanyol	Madrid
21:00 CEST (UTC+2)	Chavarría (yellow card) 28'; Pathé Ciss (yellow card) 70'	Report	Cabrera 12'; Fernández 16'; Lozano (yellow card) 55'; Puado 72' (pen.); Milla (yellow card) 87', (goal) 90'	Stadium: Campo de Fútbol de Vallecas; Attendance: 11.905; Referee: Alejandro José Hernández Hernández

13 April 2025 31	Bilbao	3–1	Rayo Vallecano	Bilbao
22:00 CEST (UTC+2)	Djaló (yellow card) 12'; Vivian (yellow card) 36'; Sancet 58' (pen.), 90+4'; N.Williams 80'; Boiro (yellow card) 84'; I.Williams (yellow card) 87'	Report	Díaz (penalty missed) 37', (yellow card) 50'; Pathé Ciss 37'; Espino (yellow card) 57'; López (yellow card) 75'	Stadium: Estadio San Mamés; Attendance: 47.584; Referee: Adrián Cordero Vega

19 April 2025 32	Rayo Vallecano	1–1	Valencia	Madrid
14:00	Pathé Ciss (yellow card) 28'; Tárrega 45' (o.g.); Lejeune (yellow card) 49'; Chavarría (yellow card) 62'	Report	Sadiq 75', (yellow card) 90'	Stadium: Vallecas; Attendance: 11.308; Referee: Alejandro Quintero González

24 April 2025 33	Atlético Madrid	3–0	Rayo Vallecano	Madrid
17:00 CEST (UTC+2)	Sørloth 3'; Gallagher 45'; Alvarez 77'	Report	Rațiu (yellow card) 66'; Batalla (yellow card) 79'	Stadium: Riyadh Air Metropolitano; Attendance: 49,410; Referee: Pablo González Fuertes

2 May 2025 34	Rayo Vallecano	1–0	Getafe	Madrid
CEST (UTC+2)				Stadium: Vallecas

15 May 2025 36	Rayo Vallecano	2–2	Real Betis	Madrid

18 May 2025 37	Celta Vigo	1–2	Rayo Vallecano	Vigo

24 May 2025 38	Rayo Vallecano	0–0	Mallorca	Madrid

=== Copa del Rey ===
29 October 2024 First round	CD Villamuriel	0–5	Rayo Vallecano	Palencia
19:00 UTC+1	Pérez (yellow card) 56'; Díez (yellow card) 74'	Report	De Tomás 43' (pen.), 48'; Trejo 45'; Guardiola 68'; Eto'o 88'	Stadium: Estadio La Nueva Balastera; Attendance: 8.000; Referee: Ricardo de Burgos Bengoetxea

4 December 2024 Second round	Unionistas de Salamanca CF	2–3	Rayo Vallecano	Salamanca
19:00 UTC+1	Martin 15'; Baz 19'; Arriba (yellow card) 43'; Vergés (yellow card) 45+4'; Iñaki (yellow card) 59'; Dani García (red card) 90+7'; Moreno (red card) 90+8'	Report	Trejo 36', (yellow card) 52'; Espino (yellow card) 46'; Díaz 54'; Guardiola (yellow card) 56'; Embarba (yellow card) 78', (goal) 84'; Pathé Ciss (red card) 86'	Stadium: Reina Sofía; Referee: Alejandro Muñiz Ruiz

3 January 2025 Round of 32	Racing Ferrol	1–3	Rayo Vallecano	Ferrol
19:00 UTC+1	Buñuel (yellow card) 79'; Naldo (yellow card) 81'; Giménez 90+1'	Report	Espino 8'; De Frutos 32', 59', (yellow card) 48'; Óscar (yellow card) 38'; Palazón (yellow card) 83'	Stadium: Estadio Municipal da Malata; Referee: Adrián Cordero Vega

16 January 225 Round of 16	Real Sociedad	3–1	Rayo Vallecano	San Sebastián
19:30 UTC+1	Oyarzabal 23'; Zubimendi (yellow card) 43'; Olasagasti 45+1'; Sergio Gómez 79'	Report	Espino (yellow card) 17' (yellow-red card) 77'; Trejo 45+7' (pen.); Lejeune (yellow card) 59'; Palazón (yellow card) 81'	Stadium: Reale Arena; Referee: Francisco José Hernández Maeso

== Statistics ==
=== Goalscorers ===
Rank	No.	Pos.	Nat.	Player	La Liga	Copa del Rey	Total
1	19	FW	(Spain)	Jorge de Frutos	6	2	8
2	4	MF	(Spain)	Pedro Díaz	3	1	4
2	6	MF	(Senegal)	Pathé Ciss	4	0	4
2	7	MF	(Spain)	Isi Palazón	4	0	4
2	8	MF	(Argentina)	Óscar Trejo	1	3	4
2	18	MF	(Spain)	Álvaro García	4	0	4
7	11	FW	(Angola)	Randy Nteka	3	0	3
7	14	FW	(Spain)	Sergio Camello	3	0	3
7	17	MF	(Spain)	Unai López	3	0	3
10	2	DF	(Romania)	Andrei Rațiu	2	0	2
10	9	FW	(Spain)	Raúl de Tomás	0	2	2
10	16	DF	(Ghana)	Abdul Mumin	2	0	2
10	21	FW	(Spain)	Adri Embarba	1	1	2
10	24	DF	(France)	Florian Lejeune	2	0	2
15	12	FW	(Spain)	Sergi Guardiola	0	1	1
15	22	DF	(Uruguay)	Alfonso Espino	0	1	1
15	28	FW	(Cameroon)	Etienne Eto'o	0	1	1
Own goals					3	0	3
Totals					41	12	53
