= Jean Ives Valou =

Ivorian footballer (born 2006)

Personal information
- Date of birth: 22 December 2005 (age 20)
- Place of birth: Abidjan, Ivory Coast
- Height: 1.88 m (6 ft 2 in)
- Position: Centre-back

Team information
- Current team: Getafe (on loan from Villarreal)
- Number: 26

Youth career
- Étoiles Mandé
- 2024: Villarreal

Senior career*
Years	Team	Apps	(Gls)
2022–2024	Étoiles Mandé		
2024–2025	Villarreal C	2	(0)
2024–2026	Villarreal B	39	(3)
2024–	Villarreal	0	(0)
2026–	→ Getafe (loan)	1	(0)

International career^{‡}
2026–	Ivory Coast U23	1	(0)
- * Club domestic league appearances and goals as of 15 August 2026 ‡ National team caps and goals as of 29 March 2026

Jean Ives Valou (born 22 December 2005) is an Ivorian professional footballer who plays as a centre-back for La Liga club Getafe, on loan from Villarreal.

== Club career ==
=== Early career ===
Born in Abidjan, Valou played for Malian side Académie Étoiles du Mandé in the second division, before agreeing to a three-year deal with La Liga side Villarreal in August 2023, effective after his 18th birthday.

=== Villarreal ===
Valou officially joined the Yellow Submarine in February 2024, and started playing for the club's Juvenil squad before being unused in a match for the C-team. He made his senior debut with the B-team on 24 August, coming on as a late substitute for Antonio Espigares in a 1–1 Primera Federación away draw against UD Ibiza.

Valou made his first team debut with Villarreal on 29 October 2024, replacing Logan Costa at half-time in a 6–1 away routing of UD Poblense, for the campaign's Copa del Rey. After establishing himself as a regular starter for the B's, he renewed his contract until 2030 on 14 January 2026.

==== Loan to Getafe ====
On 7 July 2026, Valou was loaned to fellow top-tier side Getafe CF for the season. He made his professional debut on 15 August, replacing Martín Satriano in a 3–0 away loss to Deportivo Alavés.

== International career ==
Valou made his debut for the Ivory Coast national under-23 team on 30 March 2026, starting in a 2–2 friendly draw against Morocco.

== Career statistics ==
=== Club ===
As of match played 15 August 2026

Appearances and goals by club, season and competition
Club	Season	League			Cup		Europe		Other		Total	
Club	Season	Division	Apps	Goals	Apps	Goals	Apps	Goals	Apps	Goals	Apps	Goals
Villarreal C	2024–25	Tercera Federación	2	0	—		—		—		2	0
Villarreal B	2024–25	Primera Federación	13	0	—		—		—		13	0
Villarreal B	2025–26	Primera Federación	26	3	—		—		2 (Note: Appearances in 2026 Primera Federación play-offs)	0	28	3
Villarreal B	Total		41	3	—		—		2	0	43	3
Villarreal	2024–25	La Liga	0	0	1	0	0	0	—		1	0
Getafe (loan)	2026–27	La Liga	1	0	0	0	—		—		1	0
Career total			42	3	1	0	0	0	2	0	45	3

=== International ===
As of match played 29 March 2026

Appearances and goals by national team and year
National team	Year	Apps	Goals
Ivory Coast	2026	1	0
Total		1	0
