= Thiago Ojeda =

Argentine footballer

Personal information
- Full name: Thiago Ezequiel Ojeda
- Date of birth: 12 January 2003 (age 23)
- Place of birth: Buenos Aires, Argentina
- Height: 1.88 m (6 ft 2 in)
- Position: Attacking midfielder

Team information
- Current team: Valladolid

Youth career
- Vélez Sarsfield

Senior career*
Years	Team	Apps	(Gls)
2022–2025	Villarreal B	47	(1)
2022–2023	Villarreal C	18	(0)
2023–2024	→ Lugo (loan)	32	(1)
2024–2026	Villarreal	1	(0)
2025–2026	→ Cultural Leonesa (loan)	33	(1)
2026–	Valladolid	0	(0)
- * Club domestic league appearances and goals as of 31 May 2026

Thiago Ezequiel Ojeda (born 12 January 2003) is an Argentine footballer who plays as an attacking midfielder for Spanish club Real Valladolid.

== Club career ==
Born in Buenos Aires, Ojeda was a Vélez Sarsfield youth graduate. On 6 July 2022, he signed for Spanish side Villarreal CF after his contract expired, being initially assigned to the youth setup.

Ojeda made his professional with the reserves on 3 September 2022, coming on as a second half substitute for Diego Collado and scoring his team's third in a 3–0 Segunda División home win over CD Mirandés. He alternated between Villarreal's B and C teams during the season, before being loaned to Primera Federación side CD Lugo on 7 July 2023.

Back to the Yellow Submarine in July 2024, Ojeda made his first team – and La Liga – debut on 18 December, replacing goalscorer Ayoze Pérez in a 1–1 home draw against Rayo Vallecano. On 7 July 2025, he was loaned to Cultural y Deportiva Leonesa in the second division for the season.

On 10 July 2026, after suffering relegation with Cultu, Ojeda moved to Real Valladolid also in the second division on a four-year contract.

== Career statistics ==
As of match played 24 May 2025

Appearances and goals by club, season and competition
Club	Season	League			National cup		Continental		Other		Total	
Club	Season	Division	Apps	Goals	Apps	Goals	Apps	Goals	Apps	Goals	Apps	Goals
Vélez	2021	Argentine Primera División	0	0	0	0	0	0	0	0	0	0
Villarreal B	2022–23	Segunda División	14	1	—		—		—		14	1
Villarreal B	2024–25	Primera Federación	33	0	—		—		—		33	0
Villarreal B	Total		47	1	—		—		—		47	1
Villarreal C	2022–23	Tercera Federación	18	0	—		—		—		18	0
Lugo (loan)	2023–24	Primera Federación	32	1	3	0	—		—		35	0
Villarreal	2024–25	La Liga	1	0	0	0	—		—		1	0
Career total			98	1	0	0	0	0	0	0	98	1
