= Pelayo Fernández =

Spanish footballer (born 2003)

Personal information
- Full name: Pelayo Fernández Balboa
- Date of birth: 29 April 2003 (age 23)
- Place of birth: Vigo, Spain
- Height: 1.93 m (6 ft 4 in)
- Position: Defender

Team information
- Current team: Rayo Vallecano

Youth career
- Quirinal
- Sporting Gijón
- 2017–2019: Quirinal
- 2019–2022: Barcelona

Senior career*
| Years | Team | Apps | (Gls) |
| 2022–2024 | Barcelona B | 42 | (1) |
| 2024– | Rayo Vallecano | 5 | (0) |
| 2025–2026 | → Cádiz (loan) | 10 | (1) |
- * Club domestic league appearances and goals as of 20 August 2026

Pelayo Fernández Balboa (born 29 April 2003) is a Spanish professional footballer who plays as a defender for Rayo Vallecano.

== Career ==
Fernández joined FC Barcelona's La Masia in 2019, from CD Quirinal, and had a previous stint at Sporting de Gijón. He started his career with Spanish side Barcelona Atlètic, where he was described as "orming a tandem in the axis of the defense with the left-handed Chadi Riad who has been growing with the passing of the games until they gel together and become in one of the keys to the good season of the subsidiary".

On 2 July 2024, Fernández signed a four-year contract with La Liga side Rayo Vallecano. He made his professional debut on 29 March of the following year, starting in a 2–0 away win over Deportivo Alavés.

On 1 September 2025, Fernández was loaned to Segunda División side Cádiz CF, for one year.

== Style of play ==
Fernández mainly operates as a defender and has been described as "good ball handling has made him a starter as a defensive pivot". He has also been described as "excel in the aerial game... very effective in both positioning and anticipation".

== Personal life ==
Fernández is the son of former Spain international Sergio Fernández.

== Career statistics ==
As of match played 20 August 2026

Appearances and goals by club, season and competition
| Club | Season | League | | | Cup | | Other | | Total | |
| Club | Season | Division | Apps | Goals | Apps | Goals | Apps | Goals | Apps | Goals |
|---|---|---|---|---|---|---|---|---|---|---|
| Barcelona Atlètic | 2022–23 | Primera Federación | 28 | 1 | — | | 0 | 0 | 28 | 1 |
| Barcelona Atlètic | 2023–24 | Primera Federación | 14 | 0 | — | | 4 (Note: Appearances in 2024 Primera Federación play-offs) | 0 | 18 | 0 |
| Barcelona Atlètic | Total | | 42 | 1 | — | | 4 | 0 | 46 | 1 |
| Rayo Vallecano | 2024–25 | La Liga | 2 | 0 | 2 | 0 | — | | 4 | 0 |
| Rayo Vallecano | 2025–26 | La Liga | 1 | 0 | 0 | 0 | — | | 1 | 0 |
| Rayo Vallecano | 2026–27 | La Liga | 2 | 0 | 0 | 0 | — | | 2 | 0 |
| Rayo Vallecano | Total | | 5 | 0 | 2 | 0 | — | | 7 | 0 |
| Cádiz (loan) | 2025–26 | Segunda División | 10 | 1 | — | | — | | 10 | 1 |
| Career total | | | 57 | 2 | 2 | 0 | 4 | 0 | 63 | 2 |
