= Pau Cabanes =

Spanish footballer (born 2005)

Personal information
- Full name: Pau Cabanes de la Torre
- Date of birth: 17 February 2005 (age 21)
- Place of birth: Burriana, Spain
- Height: 1.79 m (5 ft 10 in)
- Position: Forward

Team information
- Current team: Eldense

Youth career
- Burriana
- 2019–2020: Roda
- 2020–2022: Villarreal
- 2022–2023: Roda
- 2023–2024: Villarreal

Senior career*
Years	Team	Apps	(Gls)
2023	Roda	1	(0)
2023–2024	Villarreal C	14	(4)
2023–2026	Villarreal B	14	(2)
2024–2026	Villarreal	11	(1)
2025	→ Alavés (loan)	6	(0)
2026–	Eldense	0	(0)
- * Club domestic league appearances and goals as of 27 May 2026

Pau Cabanes de la Torre (born 17 February 2005) is a Spanish footballer who plays as a forward for CD Eldense.

== Club career ==
Born in Burriana, Castellón, Valencian Community, Cabanes joined Villarreal CF's youth sides in 2019, from hometown side CD Burriana. After alternating between the youth sides of the Yellow Submarine and CD Roda, he made his senior debut with the latter's first team on 12 March 2023, coming on as a second-half substitute in a 0–0 Tercera Federación away draw against FC Jove Español San Vicente.

Cabanes scored his first senior goal on 24 September 2023, netting Villarreal CF C's second in a 5–1 home routing of CD Acero. The following 4 February, he scored a brace in a 4–3 home win over Atzeneta UE.

Cabanes made his professional debut with the reserves on 20 May 2024, replacing Jorge Pascual late into a 2–2 home draw against Albacete Balompié in the Segunda División. He made his first team – and La Liga – debut on 30 September, replacing Ilias Akhomach in a 3–1 home win over UD Las Palmas.

Cabanes scored his first goal in the top tier on 22 December 2024, netting his side's fifth in a 5–2 away win over CD Leganés. The following 31 January, he renewed his contract until 2028, being loaned to fellow top tier side Deportivo Alavés until June.

Cabanes returned to the Yellow Submarine in July 2025, but suffered a knee injury in August, which sidelined him for most of the season. On 5 August 2026, he signed a two-year contract with CD Eldense in the second division.

== International career ==
On 13 February 2024, Cabanes was called up to the Spain national under-19 team.

== Career statistics ==
As of match played 24 May 2026

Appearances and goals by club, season and competition
Club	Season	League			Cup		Europe		Other		Total	
Club	Season	Division	Apps	Goals	Apps	Goals	Apps	Goals	Apps	Goals	Apps	Goals
Roda	2022–23	Tercera Federación	1	0	—		—		—		1	0
Villarreal C	2023–24	Tercera Federación	14	4	—		—		—		14	4
Villarreal B	2023–24	Segunda División	2	0	—		—		—		2	0
Villarreal B	2024–25	Primera Federación	11	2	—		—		—		11	2
Villarreal B	2025–26	Primera Federación	1	0	—		—		—		1	0
Villarreal B	Total		14	2	—		—		—		14	2
Villarreal	2024–25	La Liga	10	1	2	1	—		—		12	2
Villarreal	2025–26	La Liga	1	0	0	0	0	0	—		1	0
Villarreal	Total		11	1	2	1	0	0	—		13	2
Alavés (loan)	2024–25	La Liga	6	0	—		—		—		6	0
Career total			46	7	2	1	0	0	0	0	48	8
