= 2024–25 Villarreal CF season =

Villarreal CF
2024–25 season
- President: Fernando Roig
- Head coach: Marcelino
- Stadium: Estadio de la Cerámica
- La Liga: 5th
- Copa del Rey: Second round
- Top goalscorer: League: Ayoze Pérez (19); All: Ayoze Pérez (22)
- Highest home attendance: 22,048
- Average home league attendance: 18,267
- Biggest win: Poblense 1–6 Villarreal
- Biggest defeat: Barcelona 5–1 Villarreal
Home colours	Away colours	Third colours

The 2024–25 season was the 102nd season in the history of Villarreal Club de Fútbol, and the club's 12th consecutive season in La Liga. In addition to the domestic league, the club participated in the Copa del Rey.

Villarreal did not participate in any European competition for the first time since the 2019–20 season, due to their eighth-place league finish in the previous campaign.

== Players ==
=== First-team squad ===
As of 3 February 2025

Note: Flags indicate national team as defined under FIFA eligibility rules; some limited exceptions apply. Players may hold more than one non-FIFA nationality.

No.	Pos.	Nation	Player
1	GK	BRA	Luiz Júnior
2	DF	CPV	Logan Costa
3	DF	ESP	Raúl Albiol (captain)
4	DF	CIV	Eric Bailly
5	DF	COD	Willy Kambwala
6	MF	ESP	Denis Suárez
7	FW	ESP	Gerard Moreno (3rd captain)
8	DF	ARG	Juan Foyth
9	FW	CAN	Tajon Buchanan (on loan from Inter Milan)
10	MF	ESP	Dani Parejo
11	FW	MAR	Ilias Akhomach
13	GK	ESP	Diego Conde

No.	Pos.	Nation	Player
14	MF	ESP	Santi Comesaña
15	FW	FRA	Thierno Barry
16	MF	ESP	Álex Baena (vice-captain)
17	DF	ESP	Kiko Femenía
18	MF	SEN	Pape Gueye
19	FW	CIV	Nicolas Pépé
21	FW	ESP	Yeremy Pino
22	FW	ESP	Ayoze Pérez
23	DF	ESP	Sergi Cardona
24	DF	ESP	Alfonso Pedraza
26	DF	ESP	Pau Navarro

=== Out on loan ===
Note: Flags indicate national team as defined under FIFA eligibility rules; some limited exceptions apply. Players may hold more than one non-FIFA nationality.

No.	Pos.	Nation	Player
—	DF	ESP	Adrià Altimira (at Leganés until 30 June 2025)
—	DF	ESP	Carlos Romero (at Espanyol until 30 June 2025)
—	MF	ESP	Carlo García (at Mirandés until 30 June 2025)
—	MF	ESP	Gerard Hernández (at Elche until 30 June 2025)
—	MF	ESP	Ramón Terrats (at Getafe until 30 June 2025)

No.	Pos.	Nation	Player
—	FW	NED	Arnaut Danjuma (at Girona until 30 June 2025)
—	FW	URU	Andrés Ferrari (at Sint-Truiden until 30 June 2025)
—	FW	ESP	Álex Forés (at Levante until 30 June 2025)
—	FW	ESP	Jorge Pascual (at Eibar until 30 June 2025)
—	FW	ESP	Pau Cabanes (at Alavés until 30 June 2025)

== Transfers ==
=== In ===
Pos.	Player	Transferred from	Fee	Date	Source
DF	(Colombia) Johan Mojica	(Spain) Osasuna	Loan return	30 June 2024	
FW	(Netherlands) Arnaut Danjuma	(England) Everton	Loan return	30 June 2024	
FW	(France) Haissem Hassan	(Spain) Sporting Gijón	Loan return	30 June 2024	
GK	(Spain) Diego Conde	(Spain) Leganés	€4,000,000	2 July 2024	
MF	(Senegal) Pape Gueye	(France) Marseille	Free	5 July 2024	
DF	(Democratic Republic of the Congo) Willy Kambwala	(England) Manchester United	€11,500,000	15 July 2024	
DF	(Spain) Sergi Cardona	(Spain) Las Palmas	Free	18 July 2024	
FW	(Ivory Coast) Nicolas Pépé	Unattached	Free	4 August 2024	
FW	(Spain) Ayoze Pérez	(Spain) Real Betis	€4,000,000	13 August 2024	
GK	(Brazil) Luiz Júnior	(Portugal) Famalicão	€12,000,000	20 August 2024	
FW	(France) Thierno Barry	(Switzerland) Basel	€14,000,000	21 August 2024	
DF	(Cape Verde) Logan Costa	(France) Toulouse	€17,500,000	22 August 2024	
DF	(Spain) Juan Bernat	(France) Paris Saint-Germain	Loan	30 August 2024	
MF	(Canada) Tajon Buchanan	(Italy) Inter Milan	Loan	1 February 2025	

=== Out ===
Pos.	Player	Transferred to	Fee	Date	Source
DF	(Colombia) Yerson Mosquera	(England) Wolverhampton Wanderers	End of loan	30 June 2024	
MF	(Portugal) Gonçalo Guedes	(England) Wolverhampton Wanderers	End of loan	30 June 2024	
DF	(Spain) Alberto Moreno	(Italy) Como	End of contract	1 July 2024	
GK	(Spain) Pepe Reina	(Italy) Como	End of contract	1 July 2024	
MF	(France) Francis Coquelin	Free agent	End of contract	1 July 2024	
MF	(France) Étienne Capoue	Free agent	End of contract	1 July 2024	
FW	(Spain) José Luis Morales	(Spain) Levante	End of contract	1 July 2024	
MF	(Burkina Faso) Bertrand Traoré	(Netherlands) Ajax	End of contract	1 July 2024	
FW	(Spain) Jorge Pascual	(Spain) Eibar	Loan	6 July 2024	
DF	(Spain) Carlos Romero	(Spain) Espanyol	Loan	9 July 2024	
DF	(Colombia) Johan Mojica	(Spain) Mallorca	€1,000,000	23 July 2024	
FW	(Chile) Ben Brereton Díaz	(England) Southampton	€8,300,000	30 July 2024	
GK	(Denmark) Filip Jörgensen	(England) Chelsea	€24,500,000	30 July 2024	
DF	(Algeria) Aïssa Mandi	(France) Lille	Contract terminated	1 August 2024	
FW	(Norway) Alexander Sørloth	(Spain) Atlético Madrid	€32,000,000	3 August 2024	
MF	(Spain) Manu Trigueros	(Spain) Granada	Free	8 August 2024	
FW	(France) Haissem Hassan	(Spain) Oviedo	€1,500,000	11 August 2024	
DF	(Spain) Adrià Altimira	(Spain) Leganés	Loan	21 August 2024	
FW	(Netherlands) Arnaut Danjuma	(Spain) Girona	Loan	30 August 2024	
MF	(Spain) Carlo Adriano	(Spain) Mirandés	Loan	22 January 2025	
FW	(Spain) Pau Cabanes	(Spain) Alavés	Loan	31 January 2025	
DF	(Spain) Juan Bernat	(Spain) Getafe	Contract terminated	3 February 2025	
MF	(Spain) Ramon Terrats	(Spain) Getafe	Loan	3 February 2025	

== Friendlies ==
=== Pre-season ===
The team held a camp in Switzerland from 20 July.

20 July 2024 Friendly	Villarreal	1–2	Leicester City	Évian-les-Bains, France
16:00 CEST (UTC+2)	Ndidi 30' (o.g.)	Report	Vardy 25'; Mavididi 80'	Stadium: Camille Fournier Stadium; Attendance: 0

24 July 2024 Friendly	Sion	1–3	Villarreal	Montreux, Switzerland
19:30 CEST (UTC+2)	Souza 37'	Report	Gueye 56'; Terrats 65'; Pino 77'	Stadium: Stade Eugène Parlier; Attendance: 400; Referee: Jonathan Jaussi (Switzerland)

27 July 2024 Friendly	Saint-Étienne	3–1	Villarreal	Thonon-les-Bains, France
16:30 CEST (UTC+2)	Davitashvili 56', 90'; Othman 60'	Report	Cardona 45+1'	Stadium: Stade Joseph-Moynat; Referee: Jérémie Pignard (France)

2 August 2024 Friendly	Nottingham Forest	0–0	Villarreal	West Bridgford, England
20:00 BST (UTC+1)		Report	Danjuma (penalty missed) 17'	Stadium: City Ground; Referee: Samuel Barrott (England)

6 August 2024 Friendly	Borussia Dortmund	2–2	Villarreal	Altach, Austria
18:30 CEST (UTC+2)	Adeyemi (yellow card) 6'; Gittens 72'; Sabitzer 107'	Report	Terrats 30'; Suárez 48'	Stadium: Stadion Schnabelholz; Referee: Walter Altmann (Austria)
Note: The match was played in four periods of thirty minutes each.

10 August 2024 Friendly	Brighton & Hove Albion	4–0	Villarreal	Brighton and Hove, England
15:00 BST (UTC+1)	João Pedro 15'; Welbeck 40', 85' (pen.); Minteh 70'	Report		Stadium: Falmer Stadium; Attendance: 11,527; Referee: Steve Martin (England)

== Competitions ==
=== Overall record ===
Competition	First match	Last match	Starting round	Final position	Record							
Competition	First match	Last match	Starting round	Final position	Pld	W	D	L	GF	GA	GD	Win %
La Liga	19 August 2024	25 May 2025	Matchday 1	5th	38	20	10	8	71	51	+20	52.63
Copa del Rey	29 October 2024	4 December 2024	First round	Second round	2	1	0	1	6	2	+4	50.00
Total					40	21	10	9	77	53	+24	52.50

Source: Soccerway

=== La Liga ===
==== League table ====
Pos	Team	Pld	W	D	L	GF	GA	GD	Pts	Qualification or relegation
3	Atlético Madrid	38	22	10	6	68	30	+38	76	Qualification for the Champions League league stage (Note: La Liga gained an additional Champions League place as a result of Spain gaining one of the two European Performance Spots (EPS) awarded to the two associations with the highest UEFA coefficient points in 2024–25.)
4	Athletic Bilbao	38	19	13	6	54	29	+25	70 (Note: Athletic Bilbao finished ahead of Villarreal on head-to-head points: Athletic Bilbao 2–0 Villarreal, Villarreal 0–0 Athletic Bilbao.)	Qualification for the Champions League league stage
5	Villarreal	38	20	10	8	71	51	+20	70	Qualification for the Champions League league stage
6	Real Betis	38	16	12	10	57	50	+7	60	Qualification for the Europa League league stage (Note: The 2024–25 Copa del Rey winner qualified for the Europa League league stage. Since the cup winners (Barcelona) qualified based on league position, the Europa League spot was passed to the seventh-placed team, and the Conference League spot was passed to the eighth-placed team.)
7	Celta Vigo	38	16	7	15	59	57	+2	55	Qualification for the Europa League league stage

Source: LaLiga EA Sports
Rules for classification: 1) Points; 2) Head-to-head points; 3) Head-to-head goal difference; 4) Goal difference; 5) Goals scored; 6) Fair-play points
(Note: Head-to-head record is used only after all the matches between the teams in question have been played)

==== Results summary ====
Overall								Home						Away					
Pld	W	D	L	GF	GA	GD	Pts	W	D	L	GF	GA	GD	W	D	L	GF	GA	GD
38	20	10	8	71	51	+20	70	9	7	3	43	27	+16	11	3	5	28	24	+4

Source: La Liga

==== Results by round ====
Round	1	2	3	4	5	6	7	8	9	10	11	13	14	15	16	17	12^{1}	18	19	20	21	22	23	24	25	27	28	29	30	31	32	33	26^{2}	34	35	36	37	38
Ground	H	A	H	A	A	H	A	H	A	H	A	H	A	H	A	H	H	A	A	H	A	H	A	H	A	A	H	A	H	A	H	A	H	H	A	H	A	H
Result	D	W	W	D	W	L	W	W	L	D	W	W	D	D	L	L	D	W	L	W	D	W	W	D	W	L	L	W	D	W	D	L	W	W	W	W	W	W
Position	7	5	2	4	4	6	4	3	4	4	3	4	4	4	5	5	5	5	5	5	5	5	5	5	5	5	5	5	5	5	5	6	5	5	5	5	5	5

Source: La Liga
A = Away; H = Home; W = Win; D = Draw; L = Loss; P = Postponed

^{1} Matchday 12 (vs Rayo Vallecano) was postponed due to the 2024 Spanish floods.
^{2} Matchday 26 (vs Espanyol) was postponed due to heavy rain and risk of flooding.

==== Matches ====
The league schedule was released on 18 June 2024.

19 August 2024 1	Villarreal	2–2	Atlético Madrid	Villarreal
21:30 CEST (UTC+2)	Pino (yellow card) 10'; Danjuma 18'; Koke 37' (o.g.)	Report	Llorente 20'; Le Normand (yellow card) 40'; Barrios (yellow card) 43'; Sørloth 45+5'; Lino (yellow card) 81'	Stadium: Estadio de la Cerámica; Attendance: 21,566; Referee: Guillermo Cuadra Fernández

23 August 2024 2	Sevilla	1–2	Villarreal	Seville
21:30 CEST (UTC+2)	Romero (yellow card) 45+2'; Lukebakio 45+6'; Carmona (yellow card) 81'; Marcão (yellow card) 90+6'	Report	Danjuma 2', (yellow card) 63'; Baena (yellow card) 45+1'; Bailly (yellow card) 84'; Parejo (yellow card) 88'; Pérez 90+5', (yellow card) 90+9'	Stadium: Ramón Sánchez Pizjuán; Attendance: 34,004; Referee: Isidro Díaz de Mera Escuderos

26 August 2024 3	Villarreal	4–3	Celta Vigo	Villarreal
21:30 CEST (UTC+2)	Cardona 26'; Femenía (yellow card) 55'; Barry 60'; Jailson 64' (o.g.); Albiol (yellow card) 81'; Gueye (yellow card) 85'; Parejo (penalty missed) 90+10', 90+10'; Pépé (yellow card) 90+11'	Report	Iglesias 12'; Mingueza 31'; Moriba (yellow card) 52'; Starfelt 80'; Swedberg (yellow card) 88'; Álvarez (yellow card) 90+8'	Stadium: Estadio de la Cerámica; Attendance: 19,651; Referee: Miguel Ángel Ortiz Arias

31 August 2024 4	Valencia	1–1	Villarreal	Valencia
21:30 CEST (UTC+2)	Duro 24', (yellow card) 39'; Pepelu (yellow card) 51'; Guillamón (yellow card) 62'	Report	Pino (yellow card) 42'; Pérez 45+4'; Gueye (yellow card) 50' (yellow-red card) 68'; Femenía (yellow card) 77'; Albiol (yellow card) 83'	Stadium: Mestalla; Attendance: 43,857; Referee: Jesús Gil Manzano

14 September 2024 5	Mallorca	1–2	Villarreal	Palma
14:00 CEST (UTC+2)	Costa (yellow card) 25'; Valjent (yellow card) 37'; Albiol 57' (o.g.); Lato (red card) 69'; Valery (yellow card) 90+4'	Report	Costa 27'; Cardona (yellow card) 33'; Barry (yellow card) 47'; Comesaña (yellow card) 83'; Pérez 90+4' (pen.)	Stadium: Estadi Mallorca Son Moix; Attendance: 18,303; Referee: Ricardo de Burgos Bengoetxea

22 September 2024 6	Villarreal	1–5	Barcelona	Villarreal
18:30 CEST (UTC+2)	Parejo (yellow card) 2'; Pérez 38', (yellow card) 85'; Baena (yellow card) 52'; Bailly (yellow card) 66'; Cardona (yellow card) 89'; Akhomach (yellow card) 90+1'	Report	Lewandowski 20', 35', (penalty missed) 67'; Torre 58'; Raphinha 75', 83'; Víctor (yellow card) 82'	Stadium: Estadio de la Cerámica; Attendance: 22,048; Referee: Mateo Busquets Ferrer

26 September 2024 7	Espanyol	1–2	Villarreal	Cornellà de Llobregat
19:00 CEST (UTC+2)	Carreras 45+1'; Lozano (yellow card) 46'; Romero (yellow card) 76'; Aguado (yellow card) 90+1'; Puado (yellow card) 90+3'; Cheddira (yellow card) 90+5'	Report	Pérez (yellow card) 45', (goal) 45+6', 63'; Conde (yellow card) 85'; Terrats (yellow card) 90+2'	Stadium: Stage Front Stadium; Attendance: 23,147; Referee: Alejandro Quintero González

30 September 2024 8	Villarreal	3–1	Las Palmas	Villarreal
21:00 CEST (UTC+2)	Pépé 45'; Baena (penalty missed) 51', 90+7'; Barry 84'	Report	Suárez (yellow card) 29'; Silva 47', (yellow card) 52'; Horkaš (yellow card) 50'; Januzaj (yellow card) 90+10'	Stadium: Estadio de la Cerámica; Attendance: 18,159; Referee: Mario Melero López

5 October 2024 9	Real Madrid	2–0	Villarreal	Madrid
21:00 CEST (UTC+2)	Valverde 14'; Vinícius 73'	Report	Femenía (yellow card) 33'	Stadium: Santiago Bernabéu; Attendance: 73,842; Referee: Guillermo Cuadra Fernández

20 October 2024 10	Villarreal	1–1	Getafe	Villarreal
18:30 CEST (UTC+2)	Albiol (yellow card) 23'; Comesaña 44'; Baena (yellow card) 49'; Parejo (yellow card) 90+1'; Femenía (yellow card) 90+4'	Report	Uche (yellow card) 23'; Arambarri (yellow card) 36'; Alderete (yellow card) 47', (goal) 87' (pen.)	Stadium: Estadio de la Cerámica; Attendance: 19,355; Referee: Víctor García Verdura

26 October 2024 11	Valladolid	1–2	Villarreal	Valladolid
14:00 CEST (UTC+2)	Sylla (yellow card) 50', (goal) 60' (pen.); J. Sánchez (yellow card) 56'; Cömert (yellow card) 61'; Torres (yellow card) 69'	Report	Barry 29'; Parejo (yellow card) 45+1'; Comesaña (yellow card) 49'; Costa (yellow card) 59'; Pérez 84'	Stadium: Estadio José Zorrilla; Attendance: 20,187; Referee: Francisco José Hernández Maeso

9 November 2024 13	Villarreal	3–0	Alavés	Villarreal
16:15 CET (UTC+1)	Akhomach 38'; Cardona (yellow card) 45+2'; Parejo 81' (pen.); Comesaña 90'	Report	Guevara (yellow card) 62'; Martín (yellow card) 74'; Tenaglia (yellow card) 83'	Stadium: Estadio de la Cerámica; Attendance: 17,659; Referee: Alejandro Quintero González

24 November 2024 14	Osasuna	2–2	Villarreal	Pamplona
14:00 CET (UTC+1)	Budimir 8', 20' (pen.); Boyomo (yellow card) 31'; Catena (yellow card) 52'; Oroz (yellow card) 75'; Areso (yellow card) 84'; Torró (yellow card) 90+1'; Herrera (yellow card) 90+2'	Report	Albiol (yellow card) 19'; Comesaña (yellow card) 39'; Baena (yellow card) 45', (goal) 67'; Cardona (yellow card) 45+1'; Parejo (yellow card) 84'; Gerard 90+3' (pen.)	Stadium: El Sadar; Attendance: 19,795; Referee: José Luis Munuera Montero

1 December 2024 15	Villarreal	2–2	Girona	Villarreal
14:00 CET (UTC+1)	Barry 23'; Cardona (yellow card) 40'; Baena 46'; Albiol (yellow card) 85'	Report	Krejčí (yellow card) 18', (goal) 90+7'; Gil (yellow card) 31'; Van de Beek 66', (yellow card) 90+3'; Gutiérrez (yellow card) 85'; Blind (yellow card) 90+3'; Portu (yellow card) 90+8'	Stadium: Estadio de la Cerámica; Attendance: 17,732; Referee: Miguel Ángel Ortiz Arias

8 December 2024 16	Athletic Bilbao	2–0	Villarreal	Bilbao
16:15 CET (UTC+1)	Paredes 15'; Sancet (yellow card) 55'; Prados (yellow card) 68'; I. Williams 69'	Report	Comesaña (yellow card) 35'	Stadium: San Mamés; Attendance: 47,203; Referee: Víctor García Verdura

15 December 2024 17	Villarreal	1–2	Real Betis	Villarreal
18:30 CET (UTC+1)	Gueye (yellow card) 26'; Femenía (yellow card) 39'; Baena 55', (yellow card) 60'; Pino (yellow card) 67'; Parejo (yellow card) 87'	Report	Vitor Roque 32', (yellow card) 65'; Ávila (red card) 34'; Lo Celso (yellow card) 35', (goal) 47'; Bakambu (yellow card) 36'; Ruibal (yellow card) 51'	Stadium: Estadio de la Cerámica; Attendance: 18,757; Referee: Guillermo Cuadra Fernández

18 December 2024 12	Villarreal	1–1	Rayo Vallecano	Villarreal
21:30 CET (UTC+1)	Pino (yellow card) 27'; Kambwala (red card) 32'; Pérez 45+1'; Gueye (yellow card) 54'; Ojeda (yellow card) 85'; Costa (yellow card) 90+5'	Report	García 20'; Mumin (yellow card) 45+5'; Lejeune (yellow card) 46'; Trejo (yellow card) 53'	Stadium: Estadio de la Cerámica; Attendance: 14,000; Referee: Alejandro Hernández Hernández
Note: The match was originally scheduled for 2 November 2024, but was postponed due to the 2024 Spanish floods.

22 December 2024 18	Leganés	2–5	Villarreal	Leganés
18:30 CET (UTC+1)	Cissé 6'; Raba 33'; Óscar (red card) 58'; Sáenz (red card) 77'; Altimira (yellow card) 90+1'	Report	Barry 16', 45+2' (pen.), 65', (yellow card) 79'; Pino (yellow card) 58'; Gerard 90+2' (pen.); Cabanes 90+8'	Stadium: Butarque; Attendance: 11,034; Referee: Alejandro Muñiz Ruiz

13 January 2025 19	Real Sociedad	1–0	Villarreal	San Sebastián
21:00 CET (UTC+1)	Kubo 51'; Aramburu (yellow card) 70'; Barrenetxea (yellow card) 90'; Muñoz (yellow card) 90+1'; Zubimendi (yellow card) 90+5'	Report	Baena (yellow card) 65'; Foyth (yellow card) 78'	Stadium: Reale Arena; Attendance: 20,855; Referee: César Soto Grado

20 January 2025 20	Villarreal	4–0	Mallorca	Villarreal
21:00 CET (UTC+1)	Costa 20'; Baena 24', (yellow card) 90+2'; Parejo 26'; Pino 28'	Report	Darder (yellow card) 40'; Rodríguez (yellow card) 45+4'; Mojica (yellow card) 89'	Stadium: Estadio de la Cerámica; Attendance: 14,852; Referee: José Luis Munuera Montero

25 January 2025 21	Atlético Madrid	1–1	Villarreal	Madrid
16:15 CET (UTC+1)	Giménez (yellow card) 34'; De Paul (yellow card) 52'; Lino 58'; Le Normand (yellow card) 62'; Alvarez (yellow card) 63'	Report	Pino (yellow card) 22'; Gerard 29' (pen.); Femenía (yellow card) 76'	Stadium: Riyadh Air Metropolitano; Attendance: 63,596; Referee: José María Sánchez Martínez

1 February 2025 22	Villarreal	5–1	Valladolid	Villarreal
16:15 CET (UTC+1)	Foyth (yellow card) 30'; Pérez 42'; Gueye 64'; Comesaña 70'; Barry 86'; Suárez 90+1'	Report	Rosa (yellow card) 36'; Amallah (yellow card) 66', (goal) 90+4'	Stadium: Estadio de la Cerámica; Attendance: 17,032; Referee: Isidro Díaz de Mera Escuderos

8 February 2025 23	Las Palmas	1–2	Villarreal	Las Palmas
17:30 WET (UTC+0)	Mármol (yellow card) 37'; Sandro (yellow card) 40'; McKenna (yellow card) 55'; Fuster 84'; Suárez (yellow card) 87'; Muñoz (yellow card) 90+9'; Moleiro (yellow card) 90+10'	Report	Cardona (yellow card) 33'; Comesaña (yellow card) 38'; Baena 53', (yellow card) 90'; Pérez 66'	Stadium: Estadio Gran Canaria; Attendance: 22,909; Referee: Francisco José Hernández Maeso

15 February 2025 24	Villarreal	1–1	Valencia	Villarreal
21:00 CET (UTC+1)	Gueye 32'	Report	López (yellow card) 47'; Gayà (yellow card) 48'; Sadiq 84', (yellow card) 90+3'; Pepelu (yellow card) 87'; Pérez (yellow card) 90+4'	Stadium: Estadio de la Cerámica; Attendance: 19,701; Referee: Ricardo de Burgos Bengoetxea

22 February 2025 25	Rayo Vallecano	0–1	Villarreal	Madrid
15:15 WET (UTC+0)	De Frutos (red card) 42'; Ratiu (yellow card) 78'	Report	Barry (yellow card) 44'; Pino (yellow card) 55'; Pérez 66'; Conde (yellow card) 90+1'; Parejo (yellow card) 90+5'	Stadium: Vallecas; Attendance: 13,373; Referee: Víctor García Verdura

8 March 2025 27	Alavés	1–0	Villarreal	Vitoria-Gasteiz
16:15 CET (UTC+1)	Sánchez 11'; Sivera (red card) 58'; Blanco (yellow card) 77' (yellow-red card) 90+4'; Rodríguez (yellow card) 90+1'; Diarra (yellow card) 90+2'	Report	Pino (yellow card) 70'	Stadium: Mendizorroza; Attendance: 16,582; Referee: Miguel Ángel Ortiz Arias

15 March 2025 28	Villarreal	1–2	Real Madrid	Villarreal
18:30 CET (UTC+1)	Foyth 7', (yellow card) 75'; Cardona (yellow card) 50'	Report	Mbappé 17', 23'; Tchouaméni (yellow card) 33'	Stadium: Estadio de la Cerámica; Attendance: 20,559; Referee: Jesús Gil Manzano

30 March 2025 29	Getafe	1–2	Villarreal	Getafe
14:00 CEST (UTC+2)	Rico (yellow card) 10'; Pérez 29'	Report	Pérez 15'; Kambwala (yellow card) 31'; Barry 33'; Cardona (yellow card) 78'; Comesaña (yellow card) 80'; Luiz Júnior (yellow card) 82'	Stadium: Coliseum; Attendance: 11,406; Referee: Isidro Díaz de Mera Escuderos

6 April 2025 30	Villarreal	0–0	Athletic Bilbao	Villarreal
21:00 CEST (UTC+2)	Gueye (red card) 83'	Report	Gorosabel (yellow card) 21'	Stadium: Estadio de la Cerámica; Attendance: 19,158; Referee: Mario Melero López

13 April 2025 31	Real Betis	1–2	Villarreal	Seville
18:30 CEST (UTC+2)	Ruibal 3'	Report	Foyth (yellow card) 8'; Barry (yellow card) 12', (goal) 26'; Pérez 48'; Luiz Júnior (yellow card) 52'; Cardona (yellow card) 86'	Stadium: Benito Villamarín; Attendance: 54,778; Referee: Juan Luis Pulido Santana

20 April 2025 32	Villarreal	2–2	Real Sociedad	Villarreal
16:15 CEST (UTC+2)	Pino 7', (yellow card) 41'; Pérez 60'; Cardona (yellow card) 66'; Femenía (yellow card) 90+8'; Pépé (yellow card) 90+8'	Report	Oyarzabal 19' (pen.), 49'; Gómez (yellow card) 77'	Stadium: Estadio de la Cerámica; Attendance: 17,620; Referee: Guillermo Cuadra Fernández

23 April 2025 33	Celta Vigo	3–0	Villarreal	Vigo
19:00 CEST (UTC+2)	López 45'; Beltrán (yellow card) 45+1'; Álvarez (yellow card) 48'; Iglesias 53'; Aspas 87' (pen.)	Report	Bailly (red card) 37'; Pépé (yellow card) 85'	Stadium: Balaídos; Attendance: 19,324; Referee: Javier Alberola Rojas

27 April 2025 26	Villarreal	1–0	Espanyol	Villarreal
16:15 CEST (UTC+2)	Cardona (yellow card) 45+2'; Costa (yellow card) 50'; Pino 52', (yellow card) 65'; Buchanan (yellow card) 90'	Report		Stadium: Estadio de la Cerámica; Attendance: 17,236; Referee: José Luis Munuera Montero
Note: The match was originally scheduled for 3 March 2025, but was postponed due to heavy rain and risk of flooding.

3 May 2025 34	Villarreal	4–2	Osasuna	Villarreal
16:15 CEST (UTC+2)	Pérez 2', 39'; Barry 33'; Navarro (yellow card) 61'; Pépé 71'; Comesaña (yellow card) 83'; Buchanan (yellow card) 88'; Baena (yellow card) 89'	Report	Ru. García 66'; Oroz 81' (pen.), (yellow card) 89'	Stadium: Estadio de la Cerámica; Attendance: 17,147; Referee: Alejandro Quintero González

10 May 2025 35	Girona	0–1	Villarreal	Girona
18:30 CEST (UTC+2)	Krejčí (yellow card) 1'; Herrera (yellow card) 69'	Report	Gueye (yellow card) 15'; Pérez (yellow card) 22'; Parejo (yellow card) 87'; Etta Eyong 89'	Stadium: Montilivi; Attendance: 12,011; Referee: Isidro Díaz de Mera Escuderos

14 May 2025 36	Villarreal	3–0	Leganés	Villarreal
19:00 CEST (UTC+2)	Pérez 23', 31'; Pino (yellow card) 44'; Pépé 45'	Report	Tapia (yellow card) 35'	Stadium: Estadio de la Cerámica; Attendance: 17,067; Referee: Ricardo de Burgos Bengoetxea

18 May 2025 37	Barcelona	2–3	Villarreal	Barcelona
19:00 CEST (UTC+2)	Yamal 38'; García (yellow card) 43'; López 45+5'; Olmo (yellow card) 86'	Report	Pérez 4'; Comesaña 50'; Buchanan 80'	Stadium: Estadi Olímpic Lluís Companys; Attendance: 49,558; Referee: José Luis Munuera Montero

25 May 2025 38	Villarreal	4–2	Sevilla	Villarreal
16:15 CEST (UTC+2)	Pino 4'; Gueye 8', 53'; Baena 39'	Report	Sow 29'; Carmona (yellow card) 43'; Martínez 85'	Stadium: Estadio de la Cerámica; Attendance: 17,758; Referee: Javier Alberola Rojas

=== Copa del Rey ===
29 October 2024 First round	Poblense	1–6	Villarreal	Sa Pobla
21:00 CET (UTC+1)	Soler (yellow card) 43'; Pons 67'; Rigo (yellow card) 80'	Report	Terrats 10'; Pérez 27', 35', 44'; Cabanes 38'; Gueye 57'; Valou (yellow card) 87'	Stadium: Nou Camp; Attendance: 3,400; Referee: Miguel Ángel Ortiz Arias

4 December 2024 Second round	Pontevedra	1–0	Villarreal	Pontevedra
21:00 CET (UTC+1)	Dalisson 87'	Report	Pérez (yellow card) 87'	Stadium: Pasarón; Attendance: 8,192; Referee: Pablo González Fuertes

== Statistics ==
=== Squad statistics ===
No.	Pos	Nat	Player	Total		La Liga		Copa del Rey	
No.	Pos	Nat	Player	Apps	Goals	Apps	Goals	Apps	Goals
Goalkeepers
1	GK	(Brazil) BRA	Luiz Júnior	1	0	0	0	1	0
13	GK	(Spain) ESP	Diego Conde	12	0	12	0	0	0
31	GK	(Andorra) AND	Iker Álvarez	0	0	0	0	0	0
Defenders
2	DF	(Cape Verde) CPV	Logan Costa	10	1	8+1	1	1	0
3	DF	(Spain) ESP	Raúl Albiol	10	0	9+1	0	0	0
4	DF	(Ivory Coast) CIV	Eric Bailly	8	0	6+2	0	0	0
5	DF	(Democratic Republic of the Congo) COD	Willy Kambwala	2	0	1	0	1	0
8	DF	(Argentina) ARG	Juan Foyth	0	0	0	0	0	0
12	DF	(Spain) ESP	Juan Bernat	7	0	0+6	0	1	0
17	DF	(Spain) ESP	Kiko Femenía	12	0	12	0	0	0
23	DF	(Spain) ESP	Sergi Cardona	12	1	12	1	0	0
24	DF	(Spain) ESP	Alfonso Pedraza	0	0	0	0	0	0
26	DF	(Spain) ESP	Pau Navarro	4	0	0+3	0	1	0
26	DF	(Ivory Coast) CIV	Jean Ives Valou	1	0	0	0	0+1	0
Midfielders
6	MF	(Spain) ESP	Denis Suárez	3	0	1+2	0	0	0
10	MF	(Spain) ESP	Dani Parejo	13	2	10+2	2	1	0
14	MF	(Spain) ESP	Santi Comesaña	13	2	10+2	2	0+1	0
16	MF	(Spain) ESP	Álex Baena	12	1	10+1	1	0+1	0
18	MF	(Senegal) SEN	Pape Gueye	12	1	7+4	0	1	1
20	MF	(Spain) ESP	Ramon Terrats	10	1	0+9	0	1	1
Forwards
7	FW	(Spain) ESP	Gerard Moreno	2	0	2	0	0	0
11	FW	(Morocco) MAR	Ilias Akhomach	12	1	7+4	1	0+1	0
15	FW	(France) FRA	Thierno Barry	12	3	7+4	3	0+1	0
19	FW	(Ivory Coast) CIV	Nicolas Pépé	11	1	6+5	1	0	0
21	FW	(Spain) ESP	Yeremy Pino	11	0	4+6	0	1	0
22	FW	(Spain) ESP	Ayoze Pérez	10	10	5+4	7	1	3
33	FW	(Spain) ESP	Pau Cabanes	2	1	0+1	0	1	1
Players transferred out during the season
9	FW	(Netherlands) NED	Arnaut Danjuma	3	2	3	2	0	0

Last updated: 29 October 2024
Source: Competitions

=== Goalscorers ===
Position	Players	La Liga	Copa del Rey	Total
FW	(Spain) Ayoze Pérez	19	3	22
FW	(France) Thierno Barry	11	0	11
MF	(Spain) Álex Baena	7	0	7
MF	(Senegal) Pape Gueye	4	1	5
MF	(Spain) Santi Comesaña	4	0	4
MF	(Spain) Yeremy Pino	4	0	4
FW	(Ivory Coast) Nicolas Pépé	3	0	3
FW	(Spain) Gerard Moreno	3	0	3
MF	(Spain) Dani Parejo	3	0	3
DF	(Cape Verde) Logan Costa	2	0	2
DF	(Argentina) Juan Foyth	1	0	1
DF	(Spain) Sergi Cardona	1	0	1
MF	(Morocco) Ilias Akhomach	1	0	1
MF	(Canada) Tajon Buchanan	1	0	1
FW	(Cameroon) Karl Etta Eyong	1	0	1
MF	(Spain) Denis Suárez	1	0	1
FW	(Spain) Pau Cabanes	0	1	1
