= Gumbau =

Gumbau is a Catalan surname. Notable people with the surname include:

- Gerard Gumbau (born 1994), Spanish professional footballer
- Josep Gumbau, Spanish footballer
- Valentí Sanjuan Gumbau (born 1981), Catalan journalist, sportsman, and online content creator
