= Ilias Akhomach =

Morocco international footballer (born 2004)

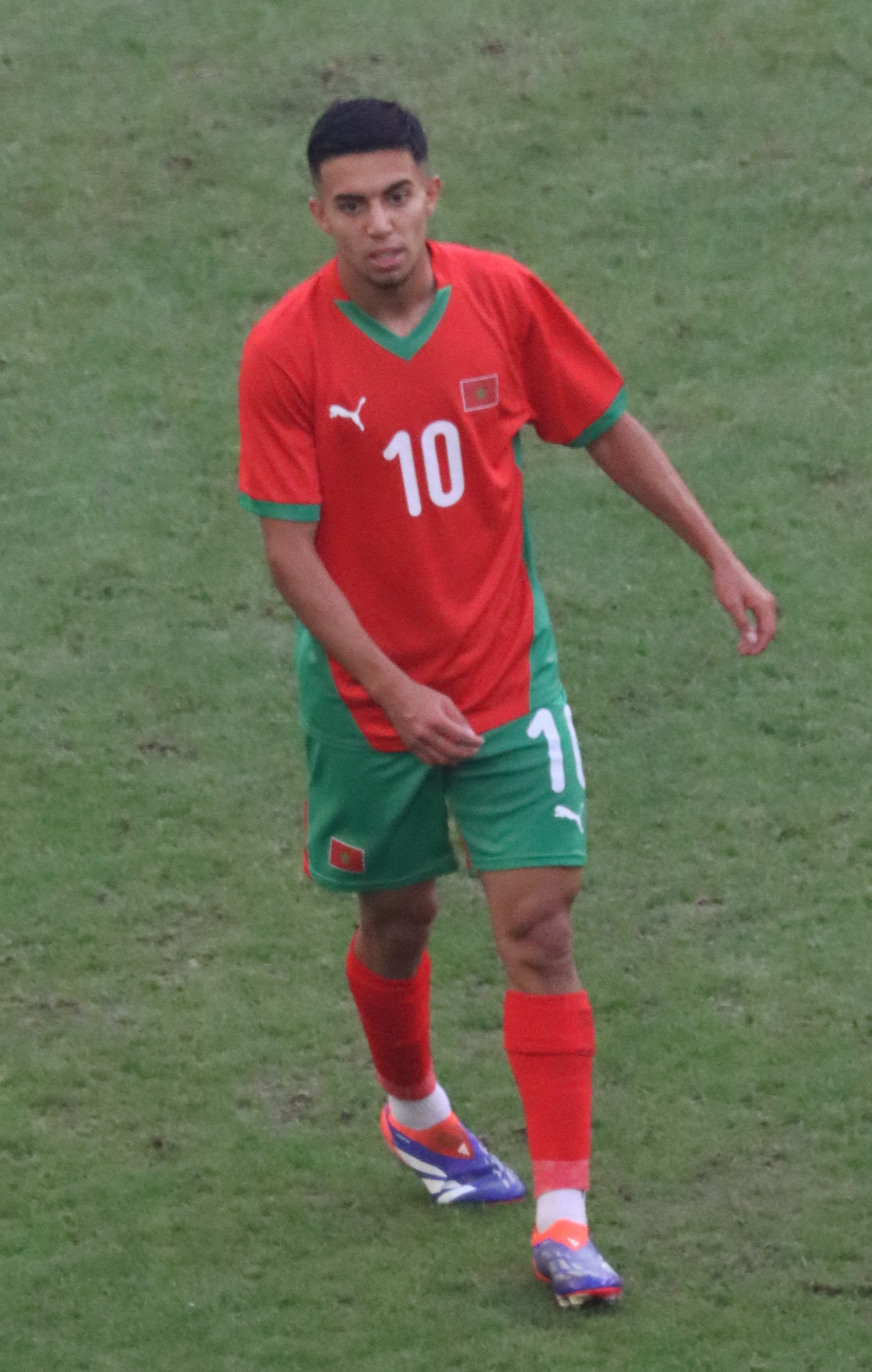
- Akhomach representing Morocco at the 2024 Summer Olympics

Personal information
- Birth name: Ilias Akhomach Chakkour (Note: In this Spanish name, the first or paternal surname is Akhomach and the second or maternal family name is Chakkour.)
- Date of birth: 16 April 2004 (age 22)
- Place of birth: Els Hostalets de Pierola, Spain
- Height: 1.75 m (5 ft 9 in)
- Position: Right winger

Team information
- Current team: Villarreal
- Number: 11

Youth career
- 2007–2013: Barcelona
- 2013–2017: Gimnàstic Manresa
- 2017–2020: Barcelona

Senior career*
Years	Team	Apps	(Gls)
2020–2023	Barcelona B	42	(4)
2021	Barcelona	2	(0)
2023–2024	Villarreal B	2	(0)
2023–	Villarreal	59	(3)
2026	→ Rayo Vallecano (loan)	11	(0)

International career^{‡}
2018	Morocco U15		
2018–2019	Spain U15		
2019–2020	Spain U16	7	(0)
2021–2022	Spain U18	8	(1)
2022–2023	Spain U19	15	(4)
2023	Spain U21	3	(1)
2023–	Morocco U23	7	(1)
2024–	Morocco	14	(0)
Medal record
Men's football
Representing Morocco
Africa Cup of Nations
Winner	2025 Morocco
Olympic Games
Third place	2024 Paris	Team
- * Club domestic league appearances and goals as of 23:56, 17 October 2026 (UTC) ‡ National team caps and goals as of 23:40, 25 September 2026 (UTC)

Ilias Akhomach (Arabic: إلياس آخوماش; born 16 April 2004) is a professional footballer who plays as a right winger for La Liga club Villarreal and the Morocco national team.

== Club career ==
=== Barcelona ===
Born in Els Hostalets de Pierola, Barcelona, Catalonia, Akhomach made his debut for FC Barcelona B on 7 November 2020, starting in a 1–0 away defeat to FC Andorra in Segunda División B. He was replaced by Nils Mortimer in the 63rd minute.

On 20 November 2021, he was selected in the first team starting line-up, for Xavi's first game as a FC Barcelona manager, a La Liga derby against RCD Espanyol. In a tense contest at the Camp Nou following the departure of Ronald Koeman, he helped his team to a 1–0 win, although he was replaced early in the second half to make way for his fellow Barcelona B winger Abde Ezzalzouli.

On 20 May 2023, it was announced that Akhomach would not renew his contract with Barça and would become a free agent when his contract expired on 30 June 2023.

=== Villarreal ===
On 3 July 2023, Akhomach signed a four-year contract with Villarreal CF, being initially assigned to the reserves in Segunda División. On 14 December, he netted his first goal in a 3–2 away win over Stade Rennais in the Europa League. On 27 January 2024, he scored his first La Liga goal in a 5–3 away victory over his former club Barcelona.

==== Loan to Rayo Vallecano ====
After signing a contract extension with Villarreal until 2028, Akhomach would be loaned to fellow La Liga side Rayo Vallecano for the rest of the season.

== International career ==
Born in Spain, Akhomach is of Moroccan descent. He is an international for Spain's youth national teams. He also played with Morocco U15 national team and won the North African U15 championship in 2018.

Akhomach made the switch to Morocco U23 national team in November 2023. He debuted in a friendly 3–0 loss to Denmark U21 on 16 November 2023.

Akhomach made his debut for the senior Morocco national team on 22 March 2024 in a friendly against Angola.

On 11 December 2025, Akhomach was called up to the Morocco squad for the 2025 Africa Cup of Nations.

== Career statistics ==
=== Club ===
As of match played 17 October 2026

Appearances and goals by club, season and competition
Club	Season	League			Copa del Rey		Europe		Total	
Club	Season	Division	Apps	Goals	Apps	Goals	Apps	Goals	Apps	Goals
Barcelona B	2020–21	Segunda División B	4	0	—		—		4	0
Barcelona B	2021–22	Primera División RFEF	15	3	—		—		15	3
Barcelona B	2022–23	Primera Federación	23	1	—		—		23	1
Barcelona B	Total		42	4	—		—		42	4
Barcelona	2021–22	La Liga	2	0	1	0	0	0	3	0
Villarreal B	2023–24	Segunda División	2	0	—		—		2	0
Villarreal	2023–24	La Liga	31	2	3	1	5 (Note: Appearances in UEFA Europa League)	1	39	4
Villarreal	2024–25	La Liga	11	1	1	0	—		12	1
Villarreal	2025–26	La Liga	9	0	2	1	4 (Note: Appearances in UEFA Champions League)	1	15	1
Villarreal	2026–27	La Liga	8	0	0	0	0	0	8	0
Villarreal	Total		59	3	6	2	9	1	74	6
Rayo Vallecano (loan)	2025–26	La Liga	11	0	—		5 (Note: Appearances in UEFA Conference League)	1	16	1
Career total			116	7	7	2	14	2	137	11

=== International ===
As of match played 25 September 2026

Appearances and goals by national team and year
National team	Year	Apps	Goals
Morocco	2024	6	0
Morocco	2025	5	0
Morocco	2026	3	0
Total		14	0

== Honours ==
Barcelona U19

- División de Honor Juvenil: 2021–22

Rayo Vallecano

- UEFA Conference League runner-up: 2025–26

Morocco U23

- Olympic Bronze Medal: 2024

Morocco

- Africa Cup of Nations: 2025
