= Willy Kambwala =

Congolese footballer (born 2004)

Personal information
- Full name: Willy Kambwala Ndengushi
- Date of birth: 25 August 2004 (age 22)
- Place of birth: Kinshasa, DR Congo
- Height: 1.88 m (6 ft 2 in)
- Position: Centre-back

Team information
- Current team: Como (on loan from Villarreal)
- Number: 53

Youth career
- 2012–2013: Elan Chevilly Larue
- 2013–2018: Les Ulis
- 2018–2020: Sochaux
- 2020–2023: Manchester United

Senior career*
| Years | Team | Apps | (Gls) |
| 2023–2024 | Manchester United | 8 | (0) |
| 2024– | Villarreal | 21 | (0) |
| 2026– | → Como (loan) | 1 | (0) |

International career^{‡}
| 2026– | DR Congo | 1 | (0) |
- * Club domestic league appearances and goals as of 18 October 2026 ‡ National team caps and goals as of 2 October 2026

Willy Kambwala Ndengushi (born 25 August 2004) is a Congolese professional footballer who plays as a centre-back for Serie A club Como, on loan from La Liga club Villarreal, and the DR Congo national team.

== Club career ==
=== Early career ===
Born in Kinshasa, DR Congo, Kambwala and his family moved to France when he was five. He was raised in Les Ulis, Essonne, and started his career with Elan Chevilly Larue and Les Ulis, before joining the academy of Sochaux in 2018.

=== Manchester United ===
Kambwala was linked with a move to English teams Liverpool and Manchester United in July 2020. He made the move to Manchester United in October 2020, signing on transfer deadline day. He suffered an eleven-month injury layoff only weeks into his spell in Manchester, returning to action in September 2021, playing in an 8–2 away win against Birmingham City's under-18 team.

He signed a professional contract with Manchester United the following month. Kambwala made his senior debut for United in December 2023, starting in a Premier League match against West Ham United. With several first-team defenders sidelined through injuries, Kambwala made his second professional start on 7 April 2024, in a league game against Liverpool that ended in a 2–2 draw at Old Trafford.

=== Villarreal ===
On 15 July 2024, Kambwala signed for La Liga club Villarreal.

==== Loan to Como ====
On 26 August 2026, Kambwala joined Serie A club Como on a one-year loan deal.

== International career ==
Kambwala is eligible to represent both France and the Democratic Republic of the Congo. He has been called up to play for the French under-16 side. In June 2025, he opted to play for the DR Congo national team.

Kambwala was one of the players who were called up with the DR Congo national team by head coach Sébastien Desabre for the 2027 Africa Cup of Nations qualification matches against Equatorial Guinea (24 September 2026), Zimbabwe (28 September) and the 2 friendlies against Uganda (2 and 5 October). He made his international debut in their first friendly against Uganda, which they lost 2–0.

== Career statistics ==
=== Club ===
As of match played 18 October 2026

Appearances and goals by club, season and competition
| Club | Season | League | | | National cup (Note: Includes FA Cup, Copa del Rey) | | League cup | | Europe | | Other | | Total | |
| Club | Season | Division | Apps | Goals | Apps | Goals | Apps | Goals | Apps | Goals | Apps | Goals | Apps | Goals |
|---|---|---|---|---|---|---|---|---|---|---|---|---|---|---|
| Manchester United U21 | 2023–24 | — | — | | — | | — | | — | | 3 (Note: Appearances in the EFL Trophy) | 0 | 3 | 0 |
| Manchester United | 2023–24 | Premier League | 8 | 0 | 2 | 0 | 0 | 0 | 0 | 0 | — | | 10 | 0 |
| Villarreal | 2024–25 | La Liga | 19 | 0 | 2 | 0 | — | | — | | — | | 21 | 0 |
| Villarreal | 2025–26 | La Liga | 2 | 0 | 0 | 0 | — | | 0 | 0 | — | | 2 | 0 |
| Villarreal | Total | | 21 | 0 | 2 | 0 | — | | 0 | 0 | — | | 23 | 0 |
| Como | 2026–27 | Serie A | 1 | 0 | 0 | 0 | — | | 0 | 0 | — | | 1 | 0 |
| Career total | | | 30 | 0 | 4 | 0 | 0 | 0 | 0 | 0 | 3 | 0 | 37 | 0 |

=== International ===
As of match played 2 October 2026

Appearances and goals by national team and year
| National team | Year | Apps | Goals |
|---|---|---|---|
| DR Congo | 2026 | 1 | 0 |
| Total | | 1 | 0 |

== Honours ==
Manchester United

- FA Cup: 2023–24
