= Logan Costa =

Cape Verde international footballer (born 2001)

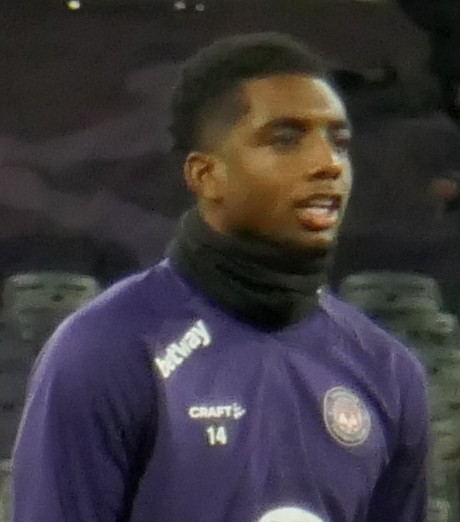
- Costa with Toulouse in 2023

Personal information
- Full name: Logan Evans Costa
- Date of birth: 1 April 2001 (age 25)
- Place of birth: Saint-Denis, France
- Height: 1.90 m (6 ft 3 in)
- Position: Centre-back

Team information
- Current team: Villarreal
- Number: 2

Youth career
- 2007–2010: ASC Val d'Argenteuil
- 2010–2016: RFC Argenteuil
- 2016–2021: Reims

Senior career*
Years	Team	Apps	(Gls)
2018–2021	Reims B	25	(2)
2020–2021	→ Le Mans (loan)	26	(0)
2021–2023	Toulouse B	11	(1)
2021–2024	Toulouse	41	(1)
2024–	Villarreal	35	(2)

International career^{‡}
2017	France U16	9	(0)
2017	France U17	1	(0)
2022–	Cape Verde	30	(0)
- * Club domestic league appearances and goals as of 6 September 2026 ‡ National team caps and goals as of 23:35, 29 September 2026 (UTC)

Logan Evans Costa (Portuguese: [ˈlo.ɡɐn ˈɛ.vɐns ˈkɔʃ.tɐ]; born 1 April 2001) is a professional footballer who plays as a centre-back for La Liga club Villarreal. Born in France, he represents the Cape Verde national team.

Costa is a former French youth international, having represented them at U16 and U17 level, before switching to play for Cape Verde in 2022.

== Early life ==
Costa was born in Saint-Denis, Île-de-France, to a Cape Verdean family.

== Club career ==
Having started to play football in Argenteuil, Val-d'Oise, Costa joined the youth academy of Reims in 2016.

A player in Reims's Championnat National 2 reserve starting in the 2018–19 season, Costa captained the side during the following campaign. With a few first-team appearances in Ligue 1 games, he was loaned to Championnat National side Le Mans for the 2020–21 season.

With Le Mans newly relegated from Ligue 2, he was one of the standout players in the team, and a revelation of the Championnat National, starting and playing the entirety of 26 games, as the club only narrowly missed the promotion play-offs.

After this promising loan spell, Costa was offered a contract extension by Reims, but chose to look elsewhere in search of more game time. With one year left on his contract, several clubs from France, Italy and Germany were interested in signing him. He was eventually transferred to Toulouse in August 2021.

Costa made his professional debut for Toulouse on 13 November 2021, starting and playing every minute of a penalty shoot-out victory over Libourne in the Coupe de France, in which he helped his team keep a clean sheet. Starting the season behind Rasmus Nicolaisen, Bafodé Diakité and Anthony Rouault, with a team aiming for promotion, Costa first only made bench appearances in Ligue 2. However, he established himself as a regular starter in the Coupe de France, even scoring his first goal against Trélissac.

On 22 August 2024, Costa joined La Liga club Villarreal on a six-year deal. He made his debut for the club on 26 August, coming on as a substitute in a league win over Celta Vigo. On 14 September, he scored his first goal for Villarreal in a 2–1 victory against Mallorca.

== International career ==
Costa was a youth international for France, playing with the under-16 and under-17 teams. He was also selected for the under-19s and under-20s, without playing any official games in a period where most of them were canceled due to the COVID-19 pandemic.

On 16 March 2022, he received his first international call-up for the Cape Verde national team. He debuted with Cape Verde in a 2–0 friendly win over Guadeloupe. He was later named in Cape Verde's squad for the 2023 Africa Cup of Nations, where he played in all five of their matches before they were eliminated in the quarter-finals.

On 18 May 2026, he was called up by Cape Verde's head coach Bubista for the 2026 FIFA World Cup.

== Personal life ==
Costa is a convert to Islam. He is one of three Muslim players in the Cape Verde squad for the 2026 FIFA World Cup, the others being Jamiro Monteiro and Steven Moreira.

== Controversy ==
On 14 May 2023, Costa reportedly refused to participate in a Ligue 1 match against Nantes due to the game being part of a league-wide campaign against homophobia, with players wearing shirts with rainbow-themed decorations. However, he later denied the allegation that he refused to play in the match.

== Career statistics ==
=== Club ===
As of match played 6 September 2026

Appearances and goals by club, season and competition
Club	Season	League			Cup		Continental		Other		Total	
Club	Season	Division	Apps	Goals	Apps	Goals	Apps	Goals	Apps	Goals	Apps	Goals
Reims B	2018–19	Championnat National 2	6	0	—		—		—		6	0
Reims B	2019–20	Championnat National 2	19	2	—		—		—		19	2
Reims B	Total		25	2	—		—		—		25	2
Le Mans (loan)	2020–21	Championnat National	26	0	0	0	—		—		26	0
Toulouse B	2021–22	Championnat National 3	10	0	—		—		—		10	0
Toulouse B	2022–23	Championnat National 3	1	1	—		—		—		1	1
Toulouse B	Total		11	1	—		—		—		11	1
Toulouse	2021–22	Ligue 2	3	0	4	1	—		—		7	1
Toulouse	2022–23	Ligue 1	6	0	6	2	—		—		12	2
Toulouse	2023–24	Ligue 1	31	1	0	0	7 (Note: Appearances in UEFA Europa League)	0	0	0	38	1
Toulouse	2024–25	Ligue 1	1	0	—		—		—		1	0
Toulouse	Total		41	1	10	3	7	0	0	0	58	4
Vllarreal	2024–25	La Liga	32	2	2	0	—		—		34	2
Vllarreal	2025–26	La Liga	2	0	0	0	0	0	—		2	0
Vllarreal	2026–27	La Liga	1	0	0	0	0	0	—		1	0
Vllarreal	Total		35	2	2	0	0	0	—		37	2
Career total			138	6	12	3	7	0	0	0	157	9

=== International ===
As of match played 29 September 2026

Appearances and goals by national team and year
National team	Year	Apps	Goals
Cape Verde	2022	4	0
Cape Verde	2023	5	0
Cape Verde	2024	13	0
Cape Verde	2026	1	0
Total		23	0

== Honours ==
Toulouse

- Ligue 2: 2021–22
- Coupe de France: 2022–23
