= Ayoze Pérez =

Spanish footballer (born 1993)

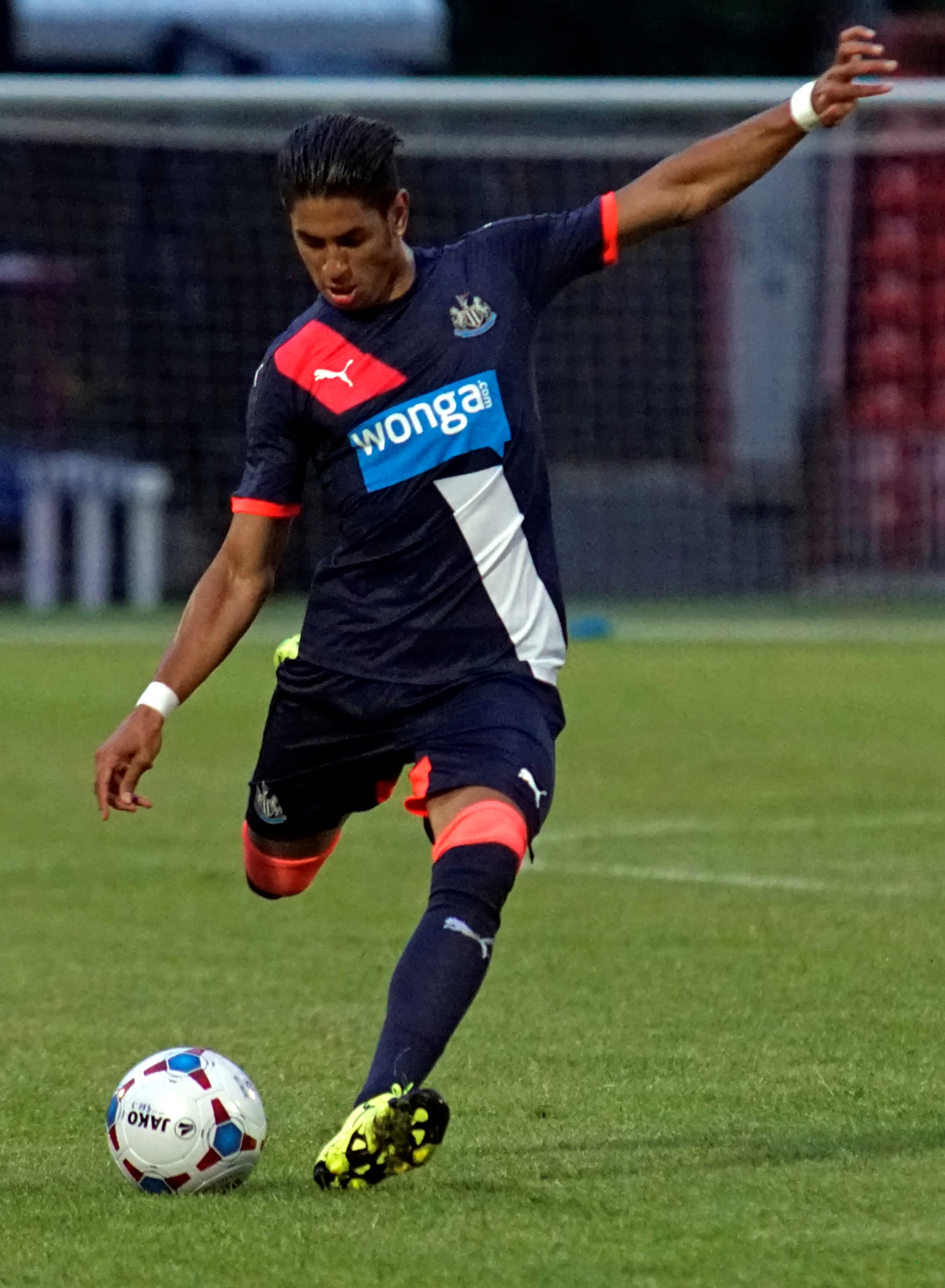
- Pérez playing for Newcastle United in 2015

Personal information
- Full name: Ayoze Pérez Gutiérrez
- Date of birth: 29 July 1993 (age 33)
- Place of birth: Santa Cruz de Tenerife, Spain
- Height: 1.78 m (5 ft 10 in)
- Positions: Attacking midfielder; left winger

Team information
- Current team: Villarreal
- Number: 22

Youth career
- 1998–2002: San Andrés
- 2002–2004: Santa Cruz
- 2004–2011: Tenerife

Senior career*
| Years | Team | Apps | (Gls) |
| 2011–2013 | Tenerife B | 35 | (11) |
| 2012–2014 | Tenerife | 50 | (17) |
| 2014–2019 | Newcastle United | 179 | (42) |
| 2019–2023 | Leicester City | 80 | (12) |
| 2023 | → Betis (loan) | 19 | (3) |
| 2023–2024 | Betis | 31 | (9) |
| 2024– | Villarreal | 55 | (24) |

International career^{‡}
| 2014 | Spain U21 | 2 | (0) |
| 2024–2025 | Spain | 5 | (2) |
Medal record
Men's football
Representing Spain
UEFA European Championship
| Winner | 2024 Germany | Team |
- * Club domestic league appearances and goals as of 23:25, 24 May 2026 (UTC) ‡ National team caps and goals as of 23:46, 20 March 2025 (UTC)

Ayoze Pérez Gutiérrez (born 29 July 1993) is a Spanish professional footballer who plays as an attacking midfielder or left winger for La Liga club Villarreal. He has also played for the Spain national team.

Pérez began his career at hometown club Tenerife, where he received several personal awards for his performances in the 2013–14 Segunda División season before joining Newcastle United for around €3 million, where he played for five seasons. In 2019, he moved to another English club, Leicester City, as he won the FA Cup and Community Shield two years later. In 2023, he was also loaned to Spanish club Real Betis with five months remaining on his Leicester contract, before he joined the club later that year on a free transfer. After one season with Betis, he joined Villarreal in 2024.

Pérez previously represented Spain internationally at under-21 level. He made his debut with the senior team in June 2024, and was a part of their UEFA Euro 2024 winning squad.

== Club career ==
=== Tenerife ===
Born in Santa Cruz de Tenerife, Canary Islands, Pérez finished his formation with local club Tenerife, making his senior debut with the B-team in the 2011–12 season, in the fourth division. He appeared with the main squad in the third level in the following campaign, featuring in 16 matches and scoring once as the Blanquiazules returned to division two after a two-year absence.

After impressing in the 2013 pre-season, Pérez played his first professional match on 18 August, starting in a 1–0 away defeat against Alcorcón. He scored his first goal in the "silver category" on 29 September, in a 1–0 home win over Real Madrid Castilla.

On 23 March of the following year Pérez scored his first hat-trick of his career, starting in a 5–0 thrashing against Ponferradina. This was one of the performances which earned him the league's Player of the Month award, which he retained for a second consecutive time while his manager Álvaro Cervera won the equivalent.

In October 2014, Pérez won the Breakthrough Player in the 2013–14 Segunda División and Best Attacking Midfielder in the 2013–14 Segunda División awards at the LFP Awards Ceremony.

=== Newcastle United ===
On 5 June 2014, Pérez rejected interest from Real Madrid, Barcelona and Porto to join Premier League club Newcastle United for an estimated €3 million fee. The deal was confirmed a day later. He made his league debut on 17 August, replacing fellow debutant Emmanuel Rivière in the 83rd minute of a 2–0 home defeat against then-champions Manchester City.

Pérez scored his first goal in his first league start on 26 October, in a 2–1 away win over Tottenham Hotspur. Six days later, as a half-time substitute for Papiss Cissé, he scored the only goal of the game to defeat Liverpool and give Newcastle their fourth successive win. On 9 November, Pérez made it three league goals in as many games in a 2–0 away win against West Bromwich Albion. He scored less frequently in the second half of the season as Newcastle struggled, but his equaliser against the same opponents on 9 May 2015 ended a run of eight consecutive defeats under John Carver, as Newcastle avoided relegation.

Pérez scored Newcastle's first in a 2–2 draw with title holders Chelsea on 26 September 2015. On 18 October, he recorded a goal in a 6–2 rout of Norwich City, Newcastle's first win of the season. He scored the only goal of an away win at Bournemouth on 7 November, with Newcastle's only shot on target. On 13 December, as a substitute, he scored an added-time winner at Tottenham Hotspur, moving Newcastle out of the relegation places.

On 1 February 2016, Newcastle United announced that Pérez signed a new contract, committing himself to the club until the summer of 2021. Pérez stayed with Newcastle despite a drop into the Championship, helping the club return to the Premiership immediately after one season. Pérez ended the season with 9 goals in 25 appearances, with 11 of them coming as starts, scoring key goals against title rivals Brighton as well as Barnsley to help seal the Championship title on the final day of the season.

He scored his first Premier League goal of the season in a 2–2 draw at Southampton on 15 October. He then scored in consecutive matches in a 1–0 away win over Stoke City and a brace in a 3–1 home win over Luton in the FA Cup. On 31 March 2018, Pérez ended his 8-match goalless run by scoring the only goal in a victory over Huddersfield, in the 80th minute. Pérez continued his good form with a goal and an assist each, in wins over Leicester City and Arsenal.

On 20 April 2019, he scored his first hat-trick for the club in a 3–1 win over Southampton. In doing so, he became the first player to score a Premier League hat-trick for Newcastle since Georginio Wijnaldum in 2015.

=== Leicester City ===
On 4 July 2019, Pérez signed a four-year contract with Leicester City for a fee of £30m. He made his competitive debut for Leicester City in a 0–0 draw with Wolverhampton Wanderers on 11 August. On 25 October 2019, Perez scored his first goal for Leicester City, going on to complete a hat-trick in a 9–0 away win over Southampton.

On 11 April 2021, Pérez was one of three players dropped from Leicester's squad for the game against West Ham United after breaching COVID-19 protocols.

=== Real Betis ===
On 31 January 2023, Pérez joined Real Betis on loan for the remainder of the 2022–23 season. He scored his first goal for the club in a 4–1 Europa League defeat against Manchester United at Old Trafford on 9 March. Later that year, on 5 June, following Leicester City's relegation from the Premier League, it was announced that Pérez and six other first team players would be leaving the club upon the expiration of their contracts at the end of the month.

On 6 July 2023, after being a free agent, Pérez joined Betis on a permanent basis and signed a four-year contract with the club.

=== Villarreal ===
On 13 August 2024, Pérez joined fellow La Liga club Villarreal on a four-year contract with the club. He scored three goals in his first five league games for Villarreal. He marked his debut season with Villarreal by scoring 19 goals, making him the club's top scorer.

== International career ==
On 29 August 2014, Pérez received his first call-up to the Spain national under-21 team for the 2015 European Under-21 Championships qualifying matches against Hungary and Austria. He made his under-21 debut as a 77th-minute substitute for Munir El Haddadi against Hungary on 4 September.

On 27 May 2024, Pérez was called up to the senior national team's provisional squad for the UEFA Euro 2024. A few days later, on 5 June, he recorded his first goal and assist on his debut in a 5–0 friendly victory against Andorra at the Estadio Nuevo Vivero.

== Personal life ==
Pérez's older brother, Samuel, is also a forward, who has played for Blyth Spartans and Berwick Rangers. He currently plays for Alnwick Town in the Northern Football Alliance Premier Division. His cousin María José Pérez is a forward for Levante UD Femenino and the Spain women's national team.

After leaving Newcastle, Pérez became the subject of a comedy-drama based on a true story when a teenage girl convinced her parents to buy the property next to his. On the day they moved in, Pérez was transferred to Leicester City. The show, starring ex-Emmerdale star Charlie Hardwick and local stand-up comedian Mike Milligan, was recorded by the Newcastle Evening Chronicle as “the most incredible story to come out of the WAGS generation”.

== Career statistics ==
=== Club ===
As of match played 24 May 2026

Appearances and goals by club, season and competition
| Club | Season | League | | | National cup (Note: Includes Copa del Rey, FA Cup) | | League cup (Note: Includes Football League/EFL Cup) | | Europe | | Other | | Total | |
| Club | Season | Division | Apps | Goals | Apps | Goals | Apps | Goals | Apps | Goals | Apps | Goals | Apps | Goals |
|---|---|---|---|---|---|---|---|---|---|---|---|---|---|---|
| Tenerife B | 2011–12 | Tercera División | 18 | 6 | — | | — | | — | | — | | 18 | 6 |
| Tenerife B | 2012–13 | Tercera División | 17 | 5 | — | | — | | — | | — | | 17 | 5 |
| Tenerife B | Total | | 35 | 11 | — | | — | | — | | — | | 35 | 11 |
| Tenerife | 2012–13 | Segunda División B | 16 | 1 | 0 | 0 | — | | — | | — | | 16 | 1 |
| Tenerife | 2013–14 | Segunda División | 34 | 16 | 1 | 0 | — | | — | | — | | 35 | 16 |
| Tenerife | Total | | 50 | 17 | 1 | 0 | — | | — | | — | | 51 | 17 |
| Newcastle United | 2014–15 | Premier League | 36 | 7 | 0 | 0 | 3 | 0 | — | | — | | 39 | 7 |
| Newcastle United | 2015–16 | Premier League | 34 | 6 | 1 | 0 | 2 | 0 | — | | — | | 37 | 6 |
| Newcastle United | 2016–17 | Championship | 36 | 9 | 2 | 0 | 3 | 3 | — | | — | | 41 | 12 |
| Newcastle United | 2017–18 | Premier League | 36 | 8 | 1 | 2 | 0 | 0 | — | | — | | 37 | 10 |
| Newcastle United | 2018–19 | Premier League | 37 | 12 | 3 | 1 | 1 | 0 | — | | — | | 41 | 13 |
| Newcastle United | Total | | 179 | 42 | 7 | 3 | 9 | 3 | — | | — | | 195 | 48 |
| Leicester City | 2019–20 | Premier League | 33 | 8 | 2 | 0 | 5 | 0 | — | | — | | 40 | 8 |
| Leicester City | 2020–21 | Premier League | 25 | 2 | 6 | 1 | 1 | 0 | 4 (Note: Appearances in UEFA Europa League) | 0 | — | | 36 | 3 |
| Leicester City | 2021–22 | Premier League | 14 | 2 | 1 | 0 | 0 | 0 | 9 (Note: Four appearances and one goal in UEFA Europa League, five appearances in UEFA Europa Conference League) | 1 | 1 (Note: Appearance in FA Community Shield) | 0 | 25 | 3 |
| Leicester City | 2022–23 | Premier League | 8 | 0 | 1 | 0 | 4 | 1 | — | | — | | 13 | 1 |
| Leicester City | Total | | 80 | 12 | 10 | 1 | 10 | 1 | 13 | 1 | 1 | 0 | 114 | 15 |
| Real Betis (loan) | 2022–23 | La Liga | 19 | 3 | — | | — | | 2 | 1 | — | | 21 | 4 |
| Real Betis | 2023–24 | La Liga | 31 | 9 | 1 | 0 | — | | 6 | 2 | — | | 38 | 11 |
| Real Betis | Betis total | | 50 | 12 | 1 | 0 | — | | 8 | 3 | — | | 59 | 15 |
| Villarreal | 2024–25 | La Liga | 30 | 19 | 2 | 3 | — | | — | | — | | 32 | 22 |
| Villarreal | 2025–26 | La Liga | 25 | 5 | 3 | 2 | — | | 5 (Note: Appearances in UEFA Champions League) | 0 | — | | 33 | 7 |
| Villarreal | Total | | 55 | 24 | 5 | 5 | — | | 5 | 0 | — | | 65 | 29 |
| Career total | | | 449 | 118 | 24 | 9 | 19 | 4 | 26 | 4 | 1 | 0 | 519 | 135 |

=== International ===
As of match played 20 March 2025

Appearances and goals by national team and year
| National team | Year | Apps | Goals |
|---|---|---|---|
| Spain | 2024 | 4 | 2 |
| Spain | 2025 | 1 | 0 |
| Total | | 5 | 2 |

Scores and results list Spain's goal tally first.

List of international goals scored by Ayoze Pérez
| No. | Date | Venue | Cap | Opponent | Score | Result | Competition |
|---|---|---|---|---|---|---|---|
| 1 | 5 June 2024 | Nuevo Vivero, Badajoz, Spain | 1 | Andorra | 1–0 | 5–0 | Friendly |
| 2 | 15 November 2024 | Parken Stadium, Copenhagen, Denmark | 4 | Denmark | 2–0 | 2–1 | 2024–25 UEFA Nations League A |

== Honours ==
Newcastle United

- EFL Championship: 2016–17

Leicester City

- FA Cup: 2020–21
- FA Community Shield: 2021

Spain

- UEFA European Championship: 2024

Individual

- Segunda División Player of the Month: March 2014, April 2014
- Segunda División Breakthrough Player: 2013–14
- Segunda División Best Attacking Midfielder: 2013–14
- Segunda División Team of the Season: 2013–14
- Zarra Trophy: 2024–25
- The Athletic La Liga Team of the Season: 2024–25
